= Andy Tomasic =

American baseball and football player (1917-2008)

- Pitcher
- Born: December 10, 1917; Hokendauqua, Pennsylvania, U.S.
- Died: November 27, 2008 (aged 90); Allentown, Pennsylvania, U.S.
- Batted: Right Threw: Right

MLB debut
- April 28, 1949, for the New York Giants

Last MLB appearance
- September 22, 1949, for the New York Giants

MLB statistics
- Win–loss record: 0–1
- Earned run average: 18.00
- Strikeouts: 2
- Stats at Baseball Reference

Teams
- New York Giants (1949)
- Football career
No. 3, 4
- Positions: Tailback, defensive back, return specialist
Personal information
- Listed height: 6 ft 0 in (1.83 m)
- Listed weight: 175 lb (79 kg)
Career information
- High school: Whitehall (PA)
- College: Temple
- NFL draft: 1942: 16th round, 141st overall pick
Career history
- Pittsburgh Steelers (1942–1946)
Awards and highlights
- First-team All-Eastern (1941); Second-team All-Eastern (1940)
Career NFL statistics
- Pass yards: 227
- Rush yards: 214
- Receiving yards: 27
- Punt yards: 660
- Punt return yards: 219
- Punt return touchdowns: 1
- Kick return yards: 94
- Defensive interceptions: 2
- Stats at Pro Football Reference

Andrew John Tomasic Sr. (December 10, 1917 – November 27, 2008) was an American Major League Baseball (MLB) and National Football League (NFL) player.

He was born in Hokendauqua, Pennsylvania, a small village located within the boundaries of modern-day Whitehall, Pennsylvania.

A 1942 graduate of Philadelphia's Temple University, Tomasic was the captain of the 1941 football squad and was inducted into the school's Hall of Fame in 1971.

== Sports career ==
Tomasic was drafted by the Pittsburgh Steelers in the 16th round of the 1942 NFL draft. He was a halfback, defensive back, and return specialist. After making his NFL debut in 1942, Tomasic did not play from 1943 to 1945, as he served in the U.S. Army during World War II. Tomasic returned in 1946 in what would be his final NFL season.

Just before retiring from the NFL, Tomasic had already begun his professional baseball career in the minor leagues (MiLB), with the 1946 Kinston Eagles (Kinston, North Carolina), of the Coastal Plain League. His many “farm circuit” successes earned him a big-league call-up, during the (1949) MLB season. The New York Giants (NL) used Tomasic as a relief pitcher; over the 2 games in which he appeared, his win–loss record was 0–1, with 5 innings pitched, 10 earned runs allowed, striking out 2, while walking 5 batters. Tomasic batted and threw right-handed.

Tomasic died on November 27, 2008, in Allentown, Pennsylvania.
