= Stiles, Pennsylvania =

Unincorporated community in Pennsylvania, US

- Census-designated place
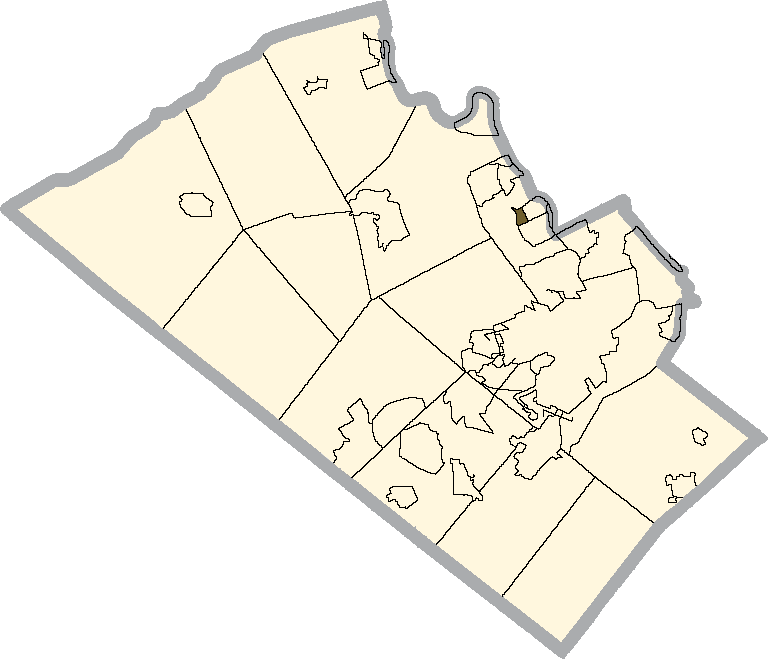
- Location of Stiles in Lehigh County, Pennsylvania

- Location of Stiles in Pennsylvania Location in the United States
- Coordinates: 40°39′55″N 75°30′30″W
- Country: United States
- State: Pennsylvania
- County: Lehigh
- Township: Whitehall

Area
  - Census-designated place: 0.22 sq mi (0.56 km^{2})
  - Land: 0.22 sq mi (0.56 km^{2})
  - Water: 0 sq mi (0.0 km^{2})
- Elevation: 356 ft (109 m)

Population (2010)
  - Census-designated place: 1,113
  - Density: 5,176/sq mi (1,998.3/km^{2})
  - Metro: 865,310 (US: 68th)
- Time zone: UTC-5 (Eastern (EST))
  - Summer (DST): UTC-4 (EDT)
- ZIP Code: 18052
- Area codes: 610 and 484
- FIPS code: 42-74160
- GNIS feature ID: 1188666

Stiles is an unincorporated community and census-designated place (CDP) that is located in Whitehall Township, Pennsylvania. As of the 2010 census, the population was 1,113.

Stiles is part of the Lehigh Valley, which had a population of 861,899 and was the 68th-most populous metropolitan area in the U.S. as of the 2020 census. It uses the Whitehall Township ZIP Code of 18052.

== Demographics ==
As of the 2020 census, there were 1,070 people, 439 housing units, and 409 families in the CDP. The racial makeup was 81.5% White, 4.7% African American, 0.2% Native American, 1.6% Asian, 0.2% Pacific Islander, 4.2% from some other race, and 7.3% from two or more races. Those of Hispanic or Latino origin made up 12.8% of the population.

The ancestry was 35.4% German, 21.5% Polish, 12.3% Arab, 7.0% Italian, and 4.5% Irish.

The median age was 54.9 years old. 24.6% of the population were 65 or older, with 22.7% between the ages of 65 and 74, 1.1% between 75 and 84, and 0.8% being 85 or older. 16.6% of the population were under 65, with 11.2% between the ages of 5 and 14, and 5.4% between 15 and 17.

The median household income was $80,320, with families having $98,194, married couples having $98,194, and non-families having $53,190. 0.0% of the population were in poverty.

== Geography ==
Stiles is located in eastern Lehigh County in central Whitehall Township. It is bordered to the east by the borough of Coplay and to the south by unincorporated Hokendauqua. Pennsylvania Route 145 passes just west of Stiles, leading south 5 miles (8 km) to the center of Allentown and north 10 miles (16 km) to Walnutport. Coplay Creek forms the western boundary of Stiles and flows southeast into the Lehigh River.

According to the U.S. Census Bureau, Stiles has a total area of 0.22 square miles (0.56 km^{2}), of which 2,219 square metres (0.5 acres), or 0.40%, are water.

Historical population
Census	Pop.	Note	%±
2000	1,089		—
2010	1,113		2.2%
