= Hokendauqua, Pennsylvania =

Unincorporated community in Pennsylvania, US

- Census-designated place
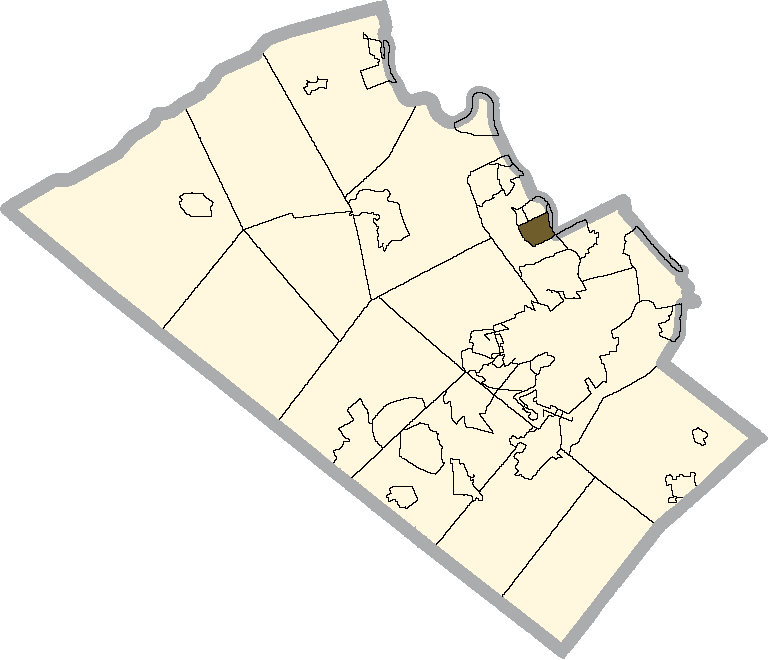
- Location of Hokendauqua in Lehigh County, Pennsylvania

- Location of Hokendauqua in Pennsylvania Location in the United States
- Coordinates: 40°39′34″N 75°29′27″W
- Country: United States
- State: Pennsylvania
- County: Lehigh
- Township: Whitehall

Area
  - Census-designated place: 1.10 sq mi (2.85 km^{2})
  - Land: 1.10 sq mi (2.85 km^{2})
  - Water: 0 sq mi (0.00 km^{2})
- Elevation: 367 ft (112 m)

Population (2020)
  - Census-designated place: 3,340
  - Density: 3,031.3/sq mi (1,170.41/km^{2})
  - Metro: 865,310 (US: 68th)
- Time zone: UTC-5 (EST)
  - Summer (DST): UTC-4 (EDT)
- ZIP Code: 18052
- Area codes: 610 and 484
- FIPS code: 42-35120
- GNIS feature ID: 1177188

Hokendauqua is an unincorporated community and census-designated place (CDP) in Whitehall Township in Lehigh County, Pennsylvania, United States. The population of Hokendauqua was 3,340 as of the 2020 census. Hokendauqua is a suburb of Allentown, Pennsylvania in the Lehigh Valley metropolitan area, which had a population of 861,899 and was the 68th-most populous metropolitan area in the U.S. as of the 2020 census.

The word Hokendauqua is shortened to "Hokey" (pronounced /ˈhɒki/ "hockey") in local dialect. It uses the Whitehall ZIP code of 18052.

== History ==
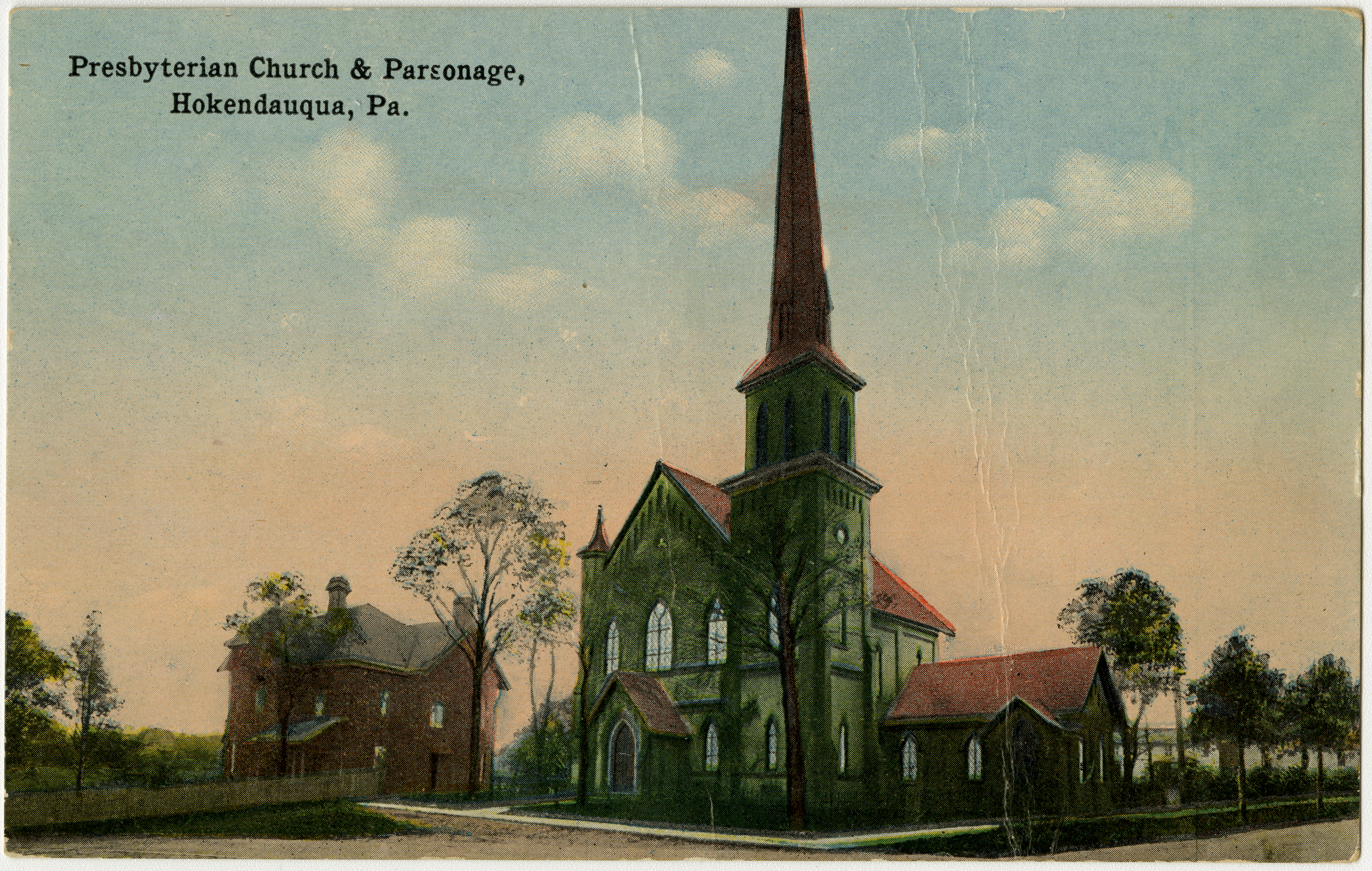
An early postcard illustration of the Presbyterian church in Hokendauqua

Hokendauqua was founded 1854. One of Hokendauqua's primary settlers, David Thomas, owned Thomas Iron Company and made Hokendauqua the company's headquarters. Thomas and his family built two iron furnaces and laid out the town, which had a church and a company shop. Hokendauqua was a company town for Thomas Iron Co.

== Geography ==
Hokendauqua is located in northeastern Lehigh County at 40°39′34″N 75°29′27″W (40.647895, -75.481828), on the east side of Whitehall Township. The borough of Coplay is directly to the north. To the northwest is the census-designated place, Stiles, and the village of West Catasauqua is directly to the south. The borough of North Catasauqua is to the east across the Lehigh River in Northampton County; a bridge connects Hokendauqua to North Catasauqua. Pennsylvania Route 145 (MacArthur Road) forms the western edge of Hokendauqua; the highway leads south 4 miles (6 km) to the center of Allentown and north 11 miles (18 km) to Walnutport.

According to the U.S. Census Bureau, the Hokendauqua CDP has a total area of 1.1 square miles (2.9 km^{2}), all land. It is drained by the Lehigh River and its tributary Coplay Creek, which flows through the southwestern part of the community.

== Demographics ==
Historical population
Census	Pop.	Note	%±
2000	3,411		—
2010	3,378		−1.0%
2020	3,340		−1.1%

=== 2020 census ===
As of the 2020 census, Hokendauqua had a population of 3,340. The median age was 47.0 years. 16.4% of residents were under the age of 18 and 24.4% of residents were 65 years of age or older. For every 100 females there were 91.3 males, and for every 100 females age 18 and over there were 91.8 males age 18 and over.

100.0% of residents lived in urban areas, while 0.0% lived in rural areas.

There were 1,418 households in Hokendauqua, of which 23.4% had children under the age of 18 living in them. Of all households, 49.7% were married-couple households, 15.4% were households with a male householder and no spouse or partner present, and 26.7% were households with a female householder and no spouse or partner present. About 26.8% of all households were made up of individuals and 14.6% had someone living alone who was 65 years of age or older.

There were 1,459 housing units, of which 2.8% were vacant. The homeowner vacancy rate was 0.4% and the rental vacancy rate was 2.4%.

Racial composition as of the 2020 census
Race	Number	Percent
White	2,653	79.4%
Black or African American	176	5.3%
American Indian and Alaska Native	4	0.1%
Asian	72	2.2%
Native Hawaiian and Other Pacific Islander	4	0.1%
Some other race	146	4.4%
Two or more races	285	8.5%
Hispanic or Latino (of any race)	410	12.3%

=== 2000 census ===
As of the 2000 census, there were 3,411 people, 1,407 households, and 970 families residing in the CDP. The population density was 3,095.5 inhabitants per square mile (1,195.2/km^{2}). There were 1,444 housing units at an average density of 1,310.4 per square mile (505.9/km^{2}). The racial makeup of the CDP was 96.16% White, 1.76% African American, 0.18% Native American, 0.85% Asian, 0.03% Pacific Islander, 0.50% from other races, and 0.53% from two or more races. Hispanic or Latino of any race were 2.08% of the population.

There were 1,407 households, out of which 27.3% had children under the age of 18 living with them, 57.6% were married couples living together, 8.1% had a female householder with no husband present, and 31.0% were non-families. 26.7% of all households were made up of individuals, and 13.8% had someone living alone who was 65 years of age or older. The average household size was 2.42 and the average family size was 2.95.

The population in Hokendauqua was spread out with 21.0% under the age of 18, 7.3% from 18 to 24, 26.2% from 25 to 44, 26.5% from 45 to 64, and 19.0% who were 65 years of age or older. The median age was 42 years. For every 100 females, there were 92.7 males. For every 100 females age 18 and over, there were 88.7 males. The median income for a household in the CDP was $39,333, and the median income for a family was $55,256. Males had a median income of $37,500 versus $26,227 for females. The per capita income for the CDP was $19,771. About 4.0% of families and 4.9% of the population were below the poverty line, including 2.6% of those under age 18 and 12.0% of those age 65 or over.

== Education ==
The community is served by the Whitehall-Coplay School District. Students in grades nine through 12 attend Whitehall High School.

== Notable residents ==
- Joe Antolick, former professional baseball player, Philadelphia Phillies
- Thomas J. Lynch, World War II flying ace
- Matt Millen, former professional football player, Oakland Raiders, San Francisco 49ers, and Washington Redskins, and former president and general manager, Detroit Lions
