= Matt Millen =

American football player and executive (born 1958)

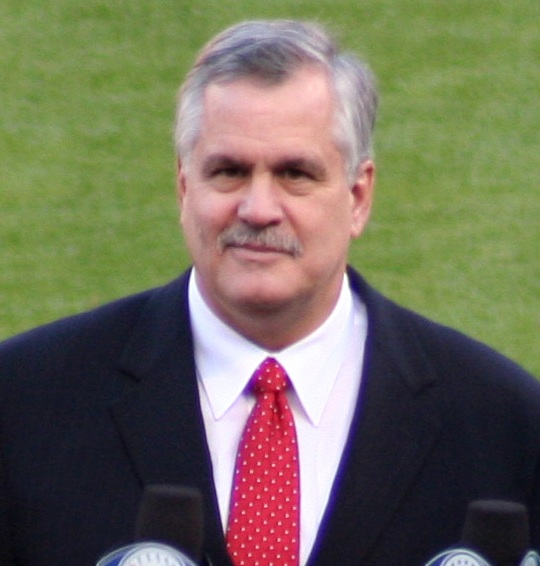
- Millen in 2009

No. 55, 54, 57
- Position: Linebacker

Personal information
- Born: March 12, 1958 (age 68); Hokendauqua, Pennsylvania, U.S.
- Listed height: 6 ft 2 in (1.88 m)
- Listed weight: 250 lb (113 kg)

Career information
- High school: Whitehall (Whitehall Township, Pennsylvania)
- College: Penn State (1976–1979)
- NFL draft: 1980: 2nd round, 43rd overall pick

Career history

Playing
- Oakland / Los Angeles Raiders (1980–1988); San Francisco 49ers (1989–1990); Washington Redskins (1991)

Operations
- Detroit Lions (2001–2008) President & CEO

Awards and highlights
- 4× Super Bowl champion (XV, XVIII, XXIV, XXVI); Pro Bowl (1988); First-team All-American (1978); First-team All-East (1978); Second-team All-East (1979)

Career NFL statistics
- Interceptions: 9
- Sacks: 17.0
- Fumble recoveries: 8
- Stats at Pro Football Reference

Matthew George Millen (born March 12, 1958) is an American former professional football player and executive in the National Football League (NFL). Millen played as a linebacker for 12 years for the Oakland and Los Angeles Raiders, San Francisco 49ers, and Washington Redskins, playing on four Super Bowl-winning teams and is the only player to win a Super Bowl ring with three different franchises.

Following his NFL playing career, Millen was a football commentator for several national television and radio networks. His last job before joining the Lions was as a member of the number two broadcast team for NFL on Fox, and the color commentator for Monday Night Football on Westwood One. On February 1, 2009, he joined the NBC broadcast team for pre-game analysis of Super Bowl XLIII. He has also been employed by ESPN as an NFL and college football analyst, and by the NFL Network as a color commentator on Thursday Night Football.

In 2001, Millen was hired as president and chief executive officer of the Detroit Lions and served in that position until 2008. His eight-year tenure as head of Detroit Lions led to the worst eight-year record in the history of the modern NFL (31–84, a .270 winning percentage), leading to fan outrage, and ultimately his termination from the franchise on September 24, 2008. Millen assembled the personnel and coaching staff of the 2008 Lions, which became the first team to go 0–16. It stood as the worst single-season record in NFL history until 2017, when it was tied by the 2017 Cleveland Browns who went winless in the season. He is generally regarded among the worst general managers in the history of modern sports.

In 2015, Millen returned to broadcasting with Fox NFL and debuted on the Big Ten Network.

== Early life and education ==
Millen was born and grew up in the Hokendauqua section of Whitehall Township, Pennsylvania, a suburb of Allentown. He attended Whitehall High School in Pennsylvania's Lehigh Valley region. Whitehall High School competes in the Eastern Pennsylvania Conference, an elite high school athletic conference known for producing a great number of National Football League and other professional athletes, and Millen was a standout football player for the school.

Whitehall High School later permanently retired Millen's Whitehall football jersey number (#83) in honor of his high school, collegiate, and NFL football accomplishments, making him one of only three Whitehall High School football players, along with fellow Whitehall High School alumni and NFL stars Saquon Barkley (#21) and Dan Koppen (#77), to have their Whitehall jersey numbers permanently retired in the school's history.

In April 2022, Millen also was inducted into the Lehigh Valley Sports Hall of Fame.

=== Penn State Nittany Lions ===
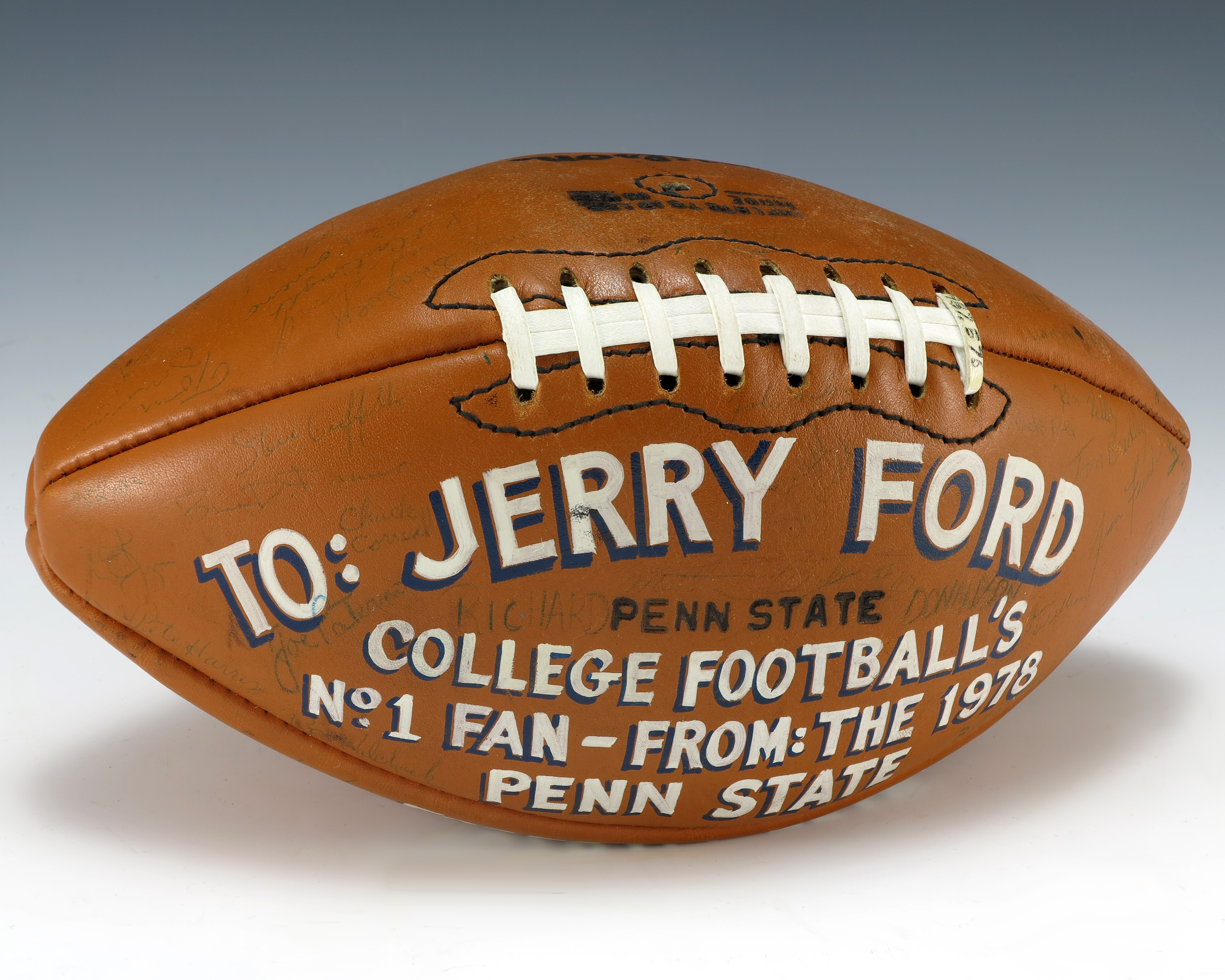
A football signed by Millen and other members of the 1978 Penn State team given to former U.S. president Gerald Ford

Millen was recruited from Whitehall High School by Penn State, where he played for the Nittany Lions in the 1976, 1977, 1978, and 1979 seasons. In 1978, Millen was named an All-American defensive tackle for Penn State.

== Career ==
=== National Football League ===
Following his career at Penn State, Millen entered the 1980 NFL draft and was selected by the Oakland Raiders with the draft's 43rd overall selection in the second round.

During his 12-year National Football League playing career, Millen played for the Raiders, the San Francisco 49ers, and the Washington Redskins. He won a Super Bowl with each of these teams, including two with the Raiders (one when the team was based in Oakland and one during their stint in Los Angeles). He won one Super Bowl each with the 49ers and Redskins, though he was deactivated for Super Bowl XXVI while with the Redskins. As of 2025, Millen is the only player in NFL history to have won Super Bowls with three different teams.

During his NFL career, he was selected to play in the Pro Bowl in 1988. Millen finished his 12 NFL seasons with 11 sacks and nine interceptions, which he returned for 132 yards, and eight fumble recoveries. He also returned seven kickoffs for 72 yards. Tackles were not yet being officially recorded at that time.

=== Television and radio ===
Following his professional football career, Millen worked as a color commentator for CBS (which teamed him with Sean McDonough, Paul Olden, Mike Emrick, and Tim Ryan), and for Fox (which teamed him with Dick Stockton). He also provided game analysis for the radio broadcasts of Monday Night Football, working alongside Howard David on CBS's Westwood One radio network.

At Fox, Millen came to be considered the number-two analyst for its nationally broadcast games, behind John Madden (who had been teaming for years with Pat Summerall). He filled in for Madden, alongside Summerall, on the 1997 American Bowl game because John Madden had fears of flying.

Millen returned to broadcasting when he served as a studio analyst for NBC's coverage of Wild Card Saturday, his first television appearance in an analyst role since the 2000 NFC Divisional Playoffs, and reprised that role for NBC on their coverage of Super Bowl XLIII.

On June 15, 2009, Millen was named the lead analyst for the NFL Network's Thursday Night Football telecast, replacing Cris Collinsworth. He was also a color analyst for ESPN College Football telecasts, teaming with Sean McDonough, Joe Tessitore, and Bob Wischusen. Since 2015, Millen has provided color commentary for college games on the Big Ten Network and occasionally for NFL on Fox.

=== Detroit Lions management ===
In 2001, Millen left broadcasting to assume the job of the Detroit Lions' CEO and de facto general manager. At that time, Millen had no prior player development or front office experience. When first approached by owner William Clay Ford Sr. about the job, Millen told him "Mr. Ford, I really appreciate this, but I'm not qualified." Ford responded "You're smart. You'll figure it out."

Millen was the Lions' CEO for seven full seasons, from 2001 to 2007; during that time, the club compiled a record of 31–81 (with at least nine losses each season). Detroit's .277 winning percentage was among the worst ever compiled by an NFL team over a seven-year period; only the Chicago Cardinals of 1939-1945 (10–61–3, .141) and the Tampa Bay Buccaneers of 1983–1989 (26–86, .234) were less successful.

During the early part of Millen's tenure (2001–2003), the Lions failed to win a road game for three years (0–24) before opening the season with a win at the Chicago Bears in 2004. Overall, the Lions went 8–50 on the road during the Millen era. Millen himself admitted to an interviewer in 2008 that the team's record under his leadership has been "beyond awful." The Wall Street Journal said that NFL executives admit in private that Millen "has made more bad draft decisions than anyone else in two centuries."

Despite the team's record on the field, Millen was the second-highest paid general manager in the NFL. With a draft record that included a number of high first-round draft picks who were considered poor choices, including Charles Rogers, Joey Harrington, Mike Williams (chosen over DeMarcus Ware despite initial organizational agreement for Ware), and others, and widespread disappointment among fans, the Detroit media, and even some players, Millen received a five-year contract extension from Ford at the start of the 2005 season. Following the team's 3–13 performance in 2006, Ford announced that Millen would be retained as general manager for at least another season, because, according to inside sources to the Ford family, they still believed that Millen was the best general manager that the Lions ever had. On September 24, 2008, Millen was confirmed to no longer hold his positions with the Lions. Whether he was dismissed or resigned was unclear. It was later reported by a team official that Millen was actually fired.

==== Competition committee ====
Millen was named to the NFL competition committee on August 4, 2006.

==== "Fire Millen" movement ====
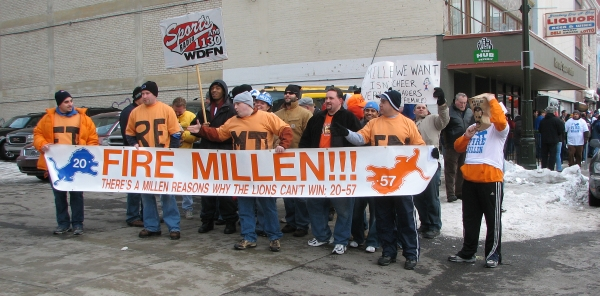
Angry Detroit Lions fans organizing a "Fire Millen" protest in December 2005

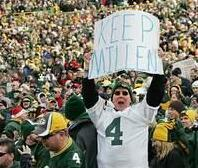
Rival Green Bay Packers fans at Lambeau Field fans insisting the Lions "Keep Millen" in September 2007

Chants of "Fire Millen!" began to spread among the Lions fanbase during a college basketball game between Michigan State and Wichita State at The Palace of Auburn Hills on December 10, 2005. It started when ousted Lions coach Steve Mariucci was shown on the big screen, prompting a standing ovation for Mariucci and a loud chant of "Fire Millen!" The chant was then heard during various home and away games of the other Detroit sports teams. It was also heard during Michigan and Michigan State basketball games. Former Pistons power forward Rasheed Wallace even took part in the chant during a late timeout in a December 16, 2005 game against the Chicago Bulls. A "Fire Millen" sign was shown in the background of a February 3, 2007 broadcast of ESPN College GameDay at the University of Kansas. One large sign with the "Fire Millen" slogan was removed by NCAA officials at the NCAA Division II Football Championship in Florence, Alabama.

"Fire Millen" turned up in a background sign in the sports-oriented comic strip Gil Thorp on February 20, 2006.

The "Fire Millen" chant returned in force to Ford Field during the second half of the 2006 Thanksgiving Day game between the Detroit Lions and the Miami Dolphins, when former Lions quarterback and first-round pick Joey Harrington, often a scapegoat for the Lions problems, led the Dolphins to a 27–10 victory over the Lions, dropping the Lions' record to 2–9. More "Fire Millen" chants were heard at wrestling events, including WWE's WrestleMania 23 at Ford Field and TNA's Bound for Glory. For 2008, the "Fire Millen" chants were back in force during the game against the Green Bay Packers.

==== Other protests ====
On December 6, 2005, Detroit sports talk radio station WDFN announced the "Angry Fan March", also known as the "Millen Man March", in protest of Millen's contract extension.

On December 9, 2005, in protest of Millen's poor record, Detroit Lions fan site "The Lions Fanatics” organized a walkout led by site owner Dan Spanos, which encouraged Lions fans to show up at Ford Field clad in hunter's orange, the color of their opponent that week, the Cincinnati Bengals.

In a game against the Chicago Bears on December 24, 2006, another group of fans, led by Herbert Nicholl Jr., planned a walkout protest towards the end of the first half to express their disgust with Millen's management.

==== Terminated from the Lions ====
After a 0–3 start to the 2008 season, Lions vice chairman and Ford Motor Company Executive Chairman William Clay Ford Jr., told reporters on September 22, 2008, if it were up to him, he would fire Millen. Despite this, the elder Ford claimed he had no plans to dismiss Millen.

Two days later, however, on September 24, 2008, Millen's tenure as team president and general manager ended. Lions owner William Clay Ford later announced that Millen had been relieved of his duties as Lions general manager and team president. The Lions finished the 2008 season with a record of 0–16 and did not win again until Week 3 of the 2009 season.

On the January 3, 2009, edition of NBC's Football Night in America, Millen admitted his role in the team's downfall, saying he would have fired himself after the 2008 season.

During the pre-game show for Super Bowl XLIII, WDIV-TV, the NBC affiliate in Detroit, ran a ticker on their website, asking viewers to question his credibility as an NBC Sports panelist, given his past with the Lions; over 36 pages of comments were posted on the station's website.

== Personal life ==
Millen is married to Patricia Millen. They have four children and ten grandchildren.

Millen was diagnosed with the rare disease amyloidosis in 2017. In Millen's case, the disease affected his heart, reducing it to operating at about 30 percent capacity. Millen was told he needed a heart transplant to continue living. As he waited for one, he began chemotherapy to rid himself of the amyloidosis. The transplant surgery was performed successfully at Beth Israel Medical Center in Newark, New Jersey on Christmas Eve 2018.

== Controversies ==
On January 5, 1986, at Los Angeles Memorial Coliseum, after losing the AFC divisional playoff game to the New England Patriots, Millen intervened in an on-field dispute between Raiders player and teammate Howie Long and Patriots general manager, Patrick Sullivan, by punching Sullivan in the face. Sullivan said the punch made him "see stars" and that he required stitches. Millen later called the incident "a good hit."

In December 2003, following a Detroit Lions 45–17 loss to the Kansas City Chiefs at Arrowhead Stadium, Millen came under fire after a postgame incident with former Lions and then-Chiefs wide receiver Johnnie Morton. Millen tried to congratulate some of the Chiefs players near the Chiefs' locker room, when he confronted Morton, who claimed that he wasn't going to say anything to Millen. When he walked by him, Millen said, "Hey Johnnie." Morton ignored him, and then Millen replied, "Nice talking to you," and Morton replied "Kiss my ass." That's when Millen shouted, "You little faggot! Yeah, you heard me. You faggot!" at Morton, which was heard by a member of the Chiefs public relations staff and a columnist for The Kansas City Star. After he was informed of Millen's remarks, Morton replied, "I apologize for what I said, but I never expected anything like that. What he said is demeaning and bigoted." Millen apologized for his remarks. There had been bad blood between the two since Morton was released by the Lions after the 2001 season, and Morton felt like Millen "tossed him aside."

On April 24, 2010, at the 2010 NFL draft in Manhattan, Millen referred to fellow ESPN commentator Ron Jaworski as a "Polack," after which he made an on-air apology, stating that he "didn't mean anything" by the remark.
