= Scherersville, Pennsylvania =

Unincorporated community in Pennsylvania, U.S.

Coordinates: 40°37′43″N 75°30′35″W

Scherersville is an unincorporated community in Lehigh County, Pennsylvania. It is located on Jordan Creek, mainly in South Whitehall Township and also in Whitehall Township. Schereresville is part of the Lehigh Valley, which has a population of 861,899 and is the 68th-most populous metropolitan area in the U.S. as of the 2020 census.

It is located on Mauch Chunk Road, just north of the 15th Street exit of U.S. Route 22. The Whitehall portion is located in Fullerton, which includes the entire southern portion of the township. The village is split between the Allentown and Whitehall Township post offices, with the Zip Codes of 18104 and 18052, respectively.

== Education ==
South Whitehall students are served by Parkland School District, while Whitehall students are served by Whitehall-Coplay School District.

== See also ==
- Lehigh County, Pennsylvania
- Lehigh Valley
