= Lehigh Valley Mall =

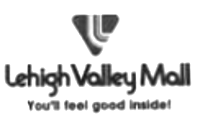

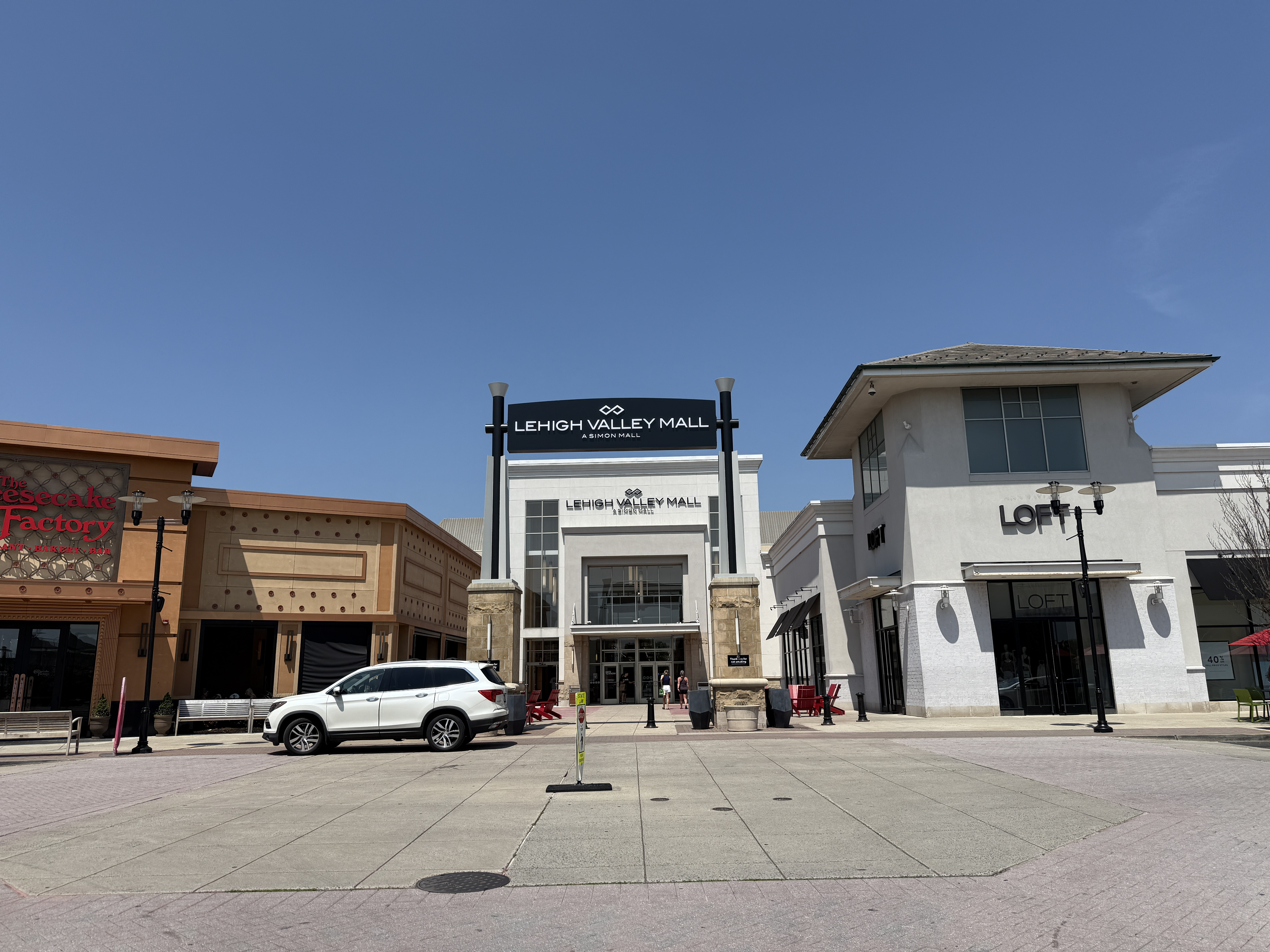
- Entrance to the Lehigh Valley Mall in June 2025
- Location: Whitehall Township, Pennsylvania, U.S.
- Coordinates: 40.631°N 75.48°W
- Address: 250 Lehigh Valley Mall
- Opened: October 6, 1976
- Developer: The Kravco Co.
- Manager: Simon Property Group
- Owner: Simon Property Group (50%); PREIT (50%)
- Num. of stores: 146
- Num. of anchor tenants: 4
- Floor area: 1,181,000 square feet (109,700 m^{2})
- Floors: 2
- Parking: Parking lot with 5,875 spaces
- Public transit: LANta bus: EBS Green Line, 103, 210, 211, 319; CT bus: 702
- Website: www.simon.com/mall/lehigh-valley-mall

Lehigh Valley Mall is an enclosed super-regional shopping mall located in Fullerton in Whitehall Township, Pennsylvania in the Lehigh Valley region of eastern Pennsylvania. With 146 stores, it is the largest shopping mall in the Lehigh Valley and the ninth largest mall in Pennsylvania.

The mall's anchor stores are JCPenney, Macy's, and Boscov's. Barnes & Noble serves as a junior anchor. In 2020, the mall also added a Dave & Buster's restaurant and video arcade.

== Background ==
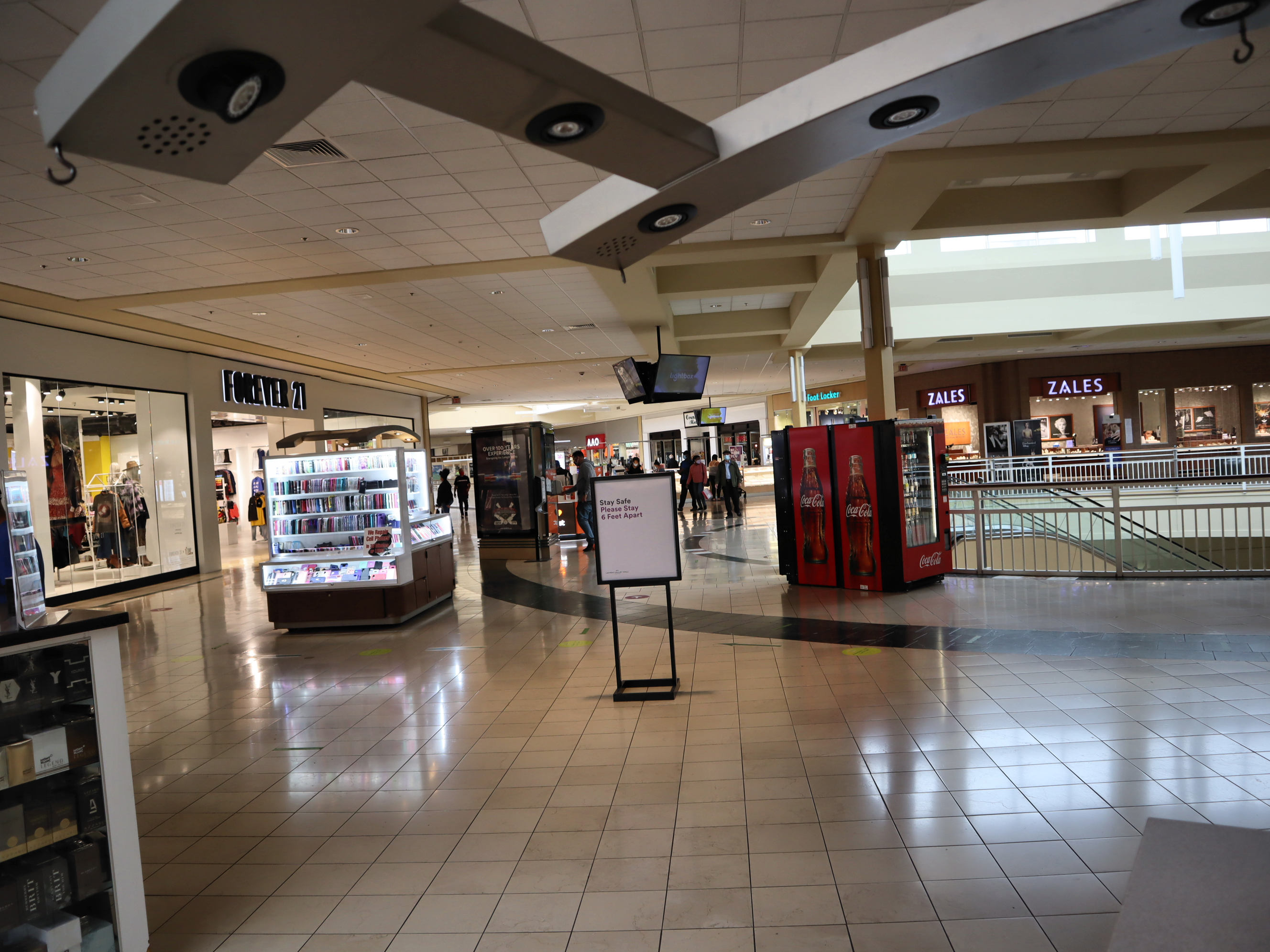
The second floor of Lehigh Valley Mall in October 2020

The largest shopping mall in Pennsylvania's Lehigh Valley region, the Lehigh Valley Mall is located north of Allentown, on MacArthur Road between U.S. Route 22 and Grape Street. The Lehigh Valley Mall is anchored by Boscov's (formerly Wanamaker's, Hecht's and Strawbridge's), JCPenney, and Macy's (formerly Bamberger's). In 2020, Dave & Buster's, a restaurant and video arcade, opened a location at Lehigh Valley Mall.

Originally opened in 1976, the mall was purchased by Simon Property Group in 2003 when it acquired The Kravco Company. Although a majority stake in the mall has since been sold to PREIT, Simon continues to manage the mall.

In 1995, the mall went under its first major renovation. The spiral ramp connecting the two levels was removed to make way for a glass elevator, fountains were removed, and renovations to the mall's interior and exterior appearance were made. A 110,000 square feet (10,000 m^{2}) lifestyle center addition was added in October 2007, housing such stores as Apple, Sephora, and Barnes & Noble.

There is an additional outdoor strip center called the Lehigh Valley Convenience Center on the east side of the lot. It has 87,280 square feet (8,109 m^{2}). Restaurants are located inside the mall and along its beltway road.

== Anchors ==
- Boscov's
- JCPenney
- Macy's

== Junior anchors ==
- Barnes & Noble

== Former anchors ==
- Bamberger's (1976-1986)
- Wanamaker's (1978-1995)
- Hecht's (1995-1997)
- Strawbridge's (1997-2006)
