= Morris A. Kravitz =

American real estate developer (1900–1988)

Morris A. Kravitz (1900 – July 17, 1988) was an American real estate developer and the founder of Kravco. He developed over 15 million square feet of retail space, including major projects such as the King of Prussia Mall and the Lehigh Valley Mall, which was completed in 1976 by his company, Kravco.

== Early life and education ==
Morris A. Kravitz was born in 1900. He was educated at the University of Pennsylvania's Wharton Evening School.

== Career ==
Kravitz began his real estate career with the development of the Manoa Shopping Center in Havertown, Delaware, in 1949. His subsequent projects included developments near Philadelphia, New Jersey, Baltimore, and Harrisburg. He was notable for introducing a leasing model that involved charging retailers minimal rent in exchange for a percentage of their sales, a method that has become standard in the industry.

From 1968 to 1969, Kravitz served as president of the International Council of Shopping Centers.

Kravitz was also a sportsman, playing semi-professional baseball and continuing to play golf into his late years, achieving a score of 78 at age 78. For his contributions, he received Commendation Award from the State of Israel.

== Philanthropy ==
Kravitz was also involved in philanthropic efforts. He held leadership positions in Jewish philanthropic organizations in Philadelphia and served on the boards of the United Way and the Philadelphia Crime Commission.

== Personal life ==
Kravitz was married to Esther (Jamison) Kravitz and they have two daughters, five grandchildren, and four great-grandchildren.
