= Walt Groller =

American polka musician (1931–2023)

- Born: Walt Groller; February 12, 1931; Allentown, Pennsylvania, U.S.
- Origin: Pennsylvania, U.S.
- Died: July 17, 2023 (aged 92) Whitehall Township, Pennsylvania, U.S.
- Genres: Polka
- Occupation: Musician
- Instrument: Accordion
- Years active: 1958–2023
- Label: Stella

Walt Groller (February 12, 1931 – July 17, 2023) was an American polka musician. He was generally considered one of the premier polka musicians in the world.

== Early life and education ==
Groller was born in Allentown, Pennsylvania, in the Lehigh Valley, to Austrian immigrants. By the age of four, he had learned to play the accordion and to play and sing folk music songs. By age 12, he was performing professionally. At age 14, he started his own orchestra. Groller attended Allentown Central Catholic High School in Center City Allentown.

In 1952, at age 21, Groller was inducted into the U.S. Army and was deployed to South Korea. Two years later, in 1954, he was discharged, and resumed his orchestra career, performing for live audiences and on radio.

== Career ==
Groller was signed by Stella Records and produced seven albums and several 45s for Stella. Perhaps his best known album was New Christmas Songs.

Following the release of his Stella Record albums, Groller started his own production label, Chalet Records in Whitehall Township, Pennsylvania and released 11 albums through it. Well known hits included "Say Thank You Dear", "Give Her Roses", and "Papa, the Old Accordion Man". Groller toured the United States and Europe in support of the albums, gaining an especially loyal following in Austria, Germany and Switzerland.

Groller hosted a weekly television show, Cafe Internationale, which aired on Fridays. A recording of his radio play, Forty Years of Music: The Old Radio Band, was released by Chalet Records.

In 1986, he was inducted in the International Polka Association's "Hall of Fame". In 1988, he was nominated for a Grammy Award. In 1990, the government of Austria presented Groller with the Austrian Decoration of Merit in Gold, an award given in recognition of those who help to preserve Austria's culture. Groller had also received a letter of commendation from Presidents Ronald Reagan, Bill Clinton, and George W. Bush. In May 1995, he received Polka News Network's "Lifetime Polka Music Award".

== Personal life ==
Groller was married with three children, two sons (Joe and Tom) and a daughter (Anita). Groller's son Joe plays drums in Groller's orchestra. He had a large extended family.

== Death ==
Groller resided in Whitehall Township, Pennsylvania. He died at his home on July 17, 2023, at the age of 92.

== Discography ==
=== Albums ===
- Bei Uns Gibts Polka
- I Wish I Were a Little Boy
- It's Polkamatic
- New Christmas Songs

=== Compilations ===
- Sharing Memories - Volume 1

=== Singles ===
- "Dut Du Du Dut Polka"
- "5 Guys From Pennsyltucky"
