= Helfrich's Springs Grist Mill =

- U.S. National Register of Historic Places
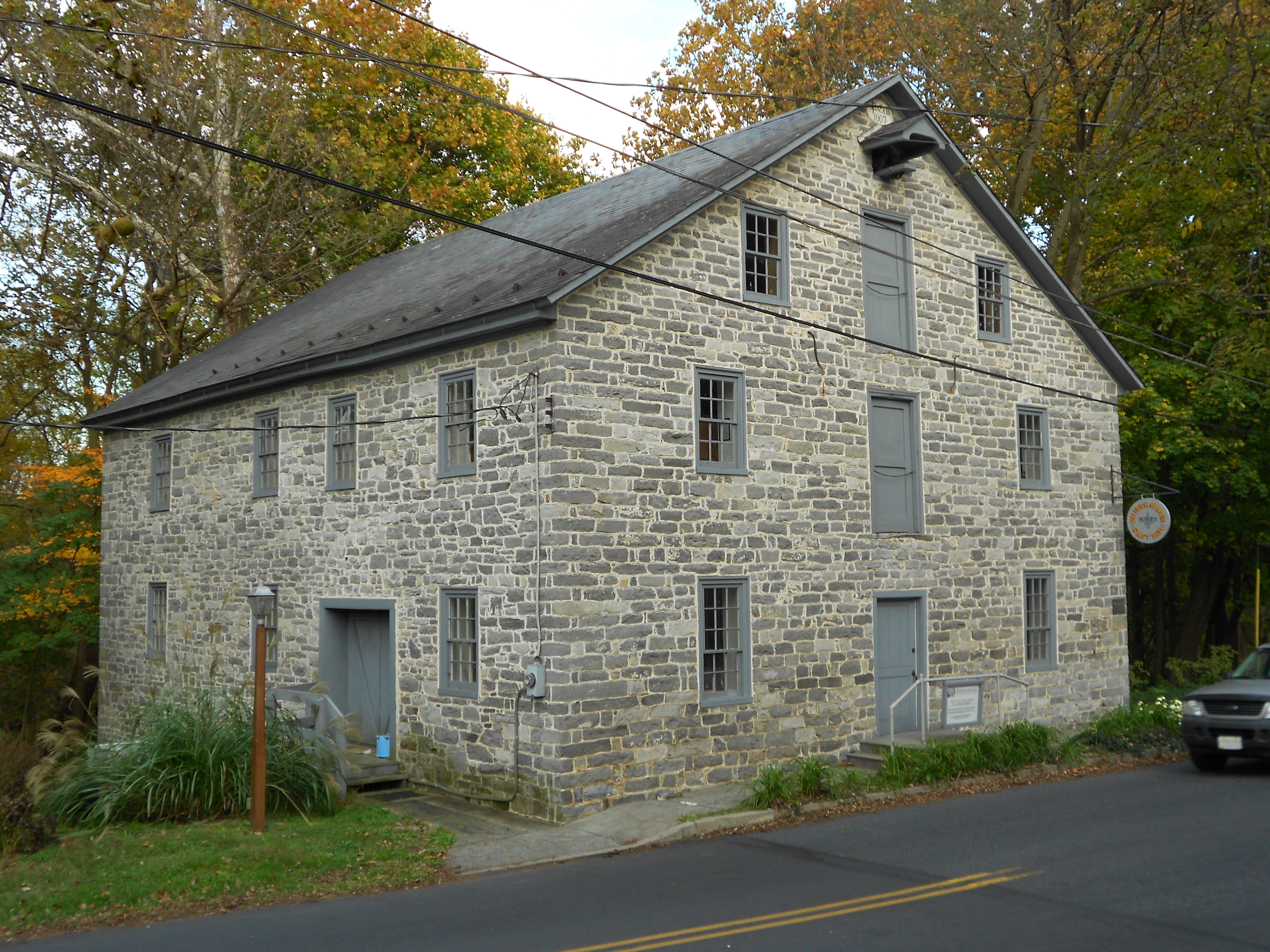
- Helfrich's Springs Grist Mill, October 2012

- Location within Pennsylvania Location within the United States
- Location: West of Fullerton on Mickley Road, Whitehall Township, Pennsylvania
- Coordinates: 40°37′31″N 75°29′29″W
- Area: 0.5 acres (0.20 ha)
- Built: 1807; 219 years ago
- NRHP reference No.: 77001174
- Added to NRHP: October 14, 1977

Helfrich's Springs Grist Mill is an historic grist mill which is located in Whitehall Township, Pennsylvania. The mill, which was built in 1807, is located along Jordan Creek.

It was added to the National Register of Historic Places in 1977. A boundary increase in 1999 added the Peter Grim House with NRHP reference number 99001288.

== History and architecture ==
This historic structure is a three-story, fieldstone mill, which is approximately 30 feet (9.1 m) wide by 58 feet (18 m) deep. It has a slate roof.

Whitehall Township acquired the property by eminent domain in 1963.

The building is owned and operated by the Whitehall Historical Preservation Society, which began restoring it in 1984.
