= Coplay Cement Company Kilns =

Historic place in Pennsylvania, US

- U.S. National Register of Historic Places
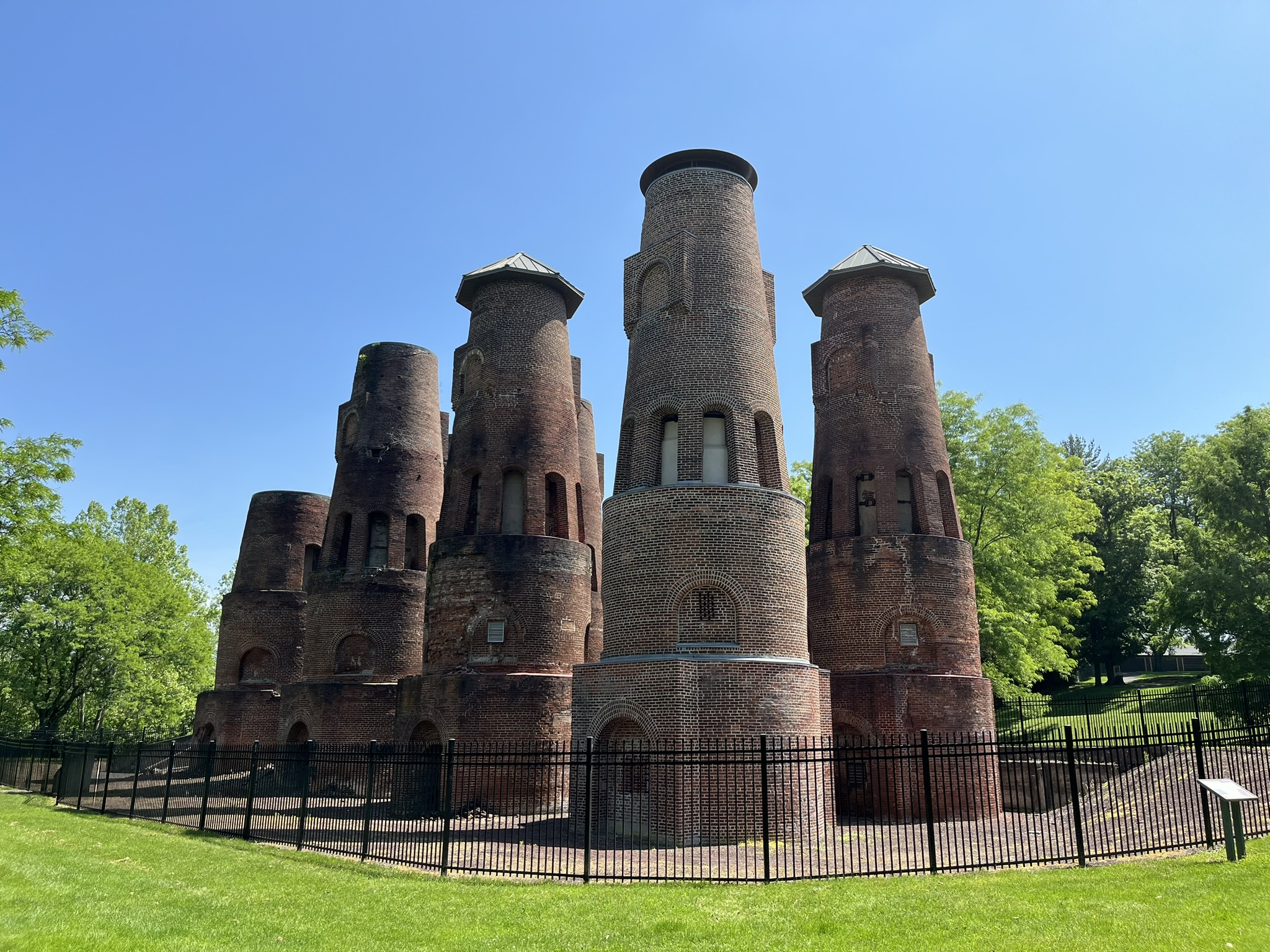
- Coplay Cement Company Kilns, May 2024

- Location within Pennsylvania Location within the United States
- Location: N. 2nd St., Coplay, Pennsylvania
- Coordinates: 40°40′34″N 75°29′42″W
- Area: 2.6 acres (1.1 ha)
- Built: 1892–1893
- Built by: Coplay Cement Co.
- Architectural style: Schoefer vertical
- NRHP reference No.: 80003556
- Added to NRHP: September 2, 1980

Coplay Cement Company Kilns, also known as the Saylor Park Industrial Museum, is an open-air historic site located at Coplay, Pennsylvania in Lehigh County, Pennsylvania. The nine kilns were built between 1892 and 1893 and used for the production of Portland cement.

The kilns are constructed from locally produced red brick, and are known as Schoefer vertical kilns. They were shut down in 1904, and the Coplay Cement Company then donated them and the surrounding land to Lehigh County in 1975, which was used in creating a cement industry museum celebrating the important role the company and cement played in the area's early economic development. It is operated as a partnership between Lehigh County, which owns and maintains the site, and the Lehigh County Historical Society, which provides educational services. It was added to the National Register of Historic Places in 1980.

The Saylor Cement Museum honors David Saylor (1827-1884), the father of the American Portland cement industry, and the people who built this industry into one of the most important in the Lehigh Valley and the nation. Lehigh County was a natural spot for cement production. Cement is made from rocks containing lime, silica, and alumina; Lehigh County limestone “cement rock” contains all three ingredients.

In 1866, David O. Saylor helped found Coplay Cement Company. In 1871, he received the first American patent for Portland cement, which is much stronger than the natural cement that had previously been produced in this country. Saylor's Portland cement built bridges, docks, jetties, roads, aqueducts, subways, and skyscrapers. By 1900, the Lehigh Valley made 72% of Portland cement produced in this country.

The first kiln at the Coplay Cement Company was a dome kiln. Dome kilns were inefficient; they had to shut down often. In 1893 Coplay Cement built Mill B, containing the Schoefer kilns standing today. Originally enclosed in a large building, Schoefer kilns could run continuously. Soon, however, the even more efficient rotary kilns came into use. Mill B's outdated Schoefer kilns shut down in 1904, and Coplay Cement later used Mill B's buildings for storage.
