= Coplay, Pennsylvania =

Borough in Pennsylvania, US

- Borough
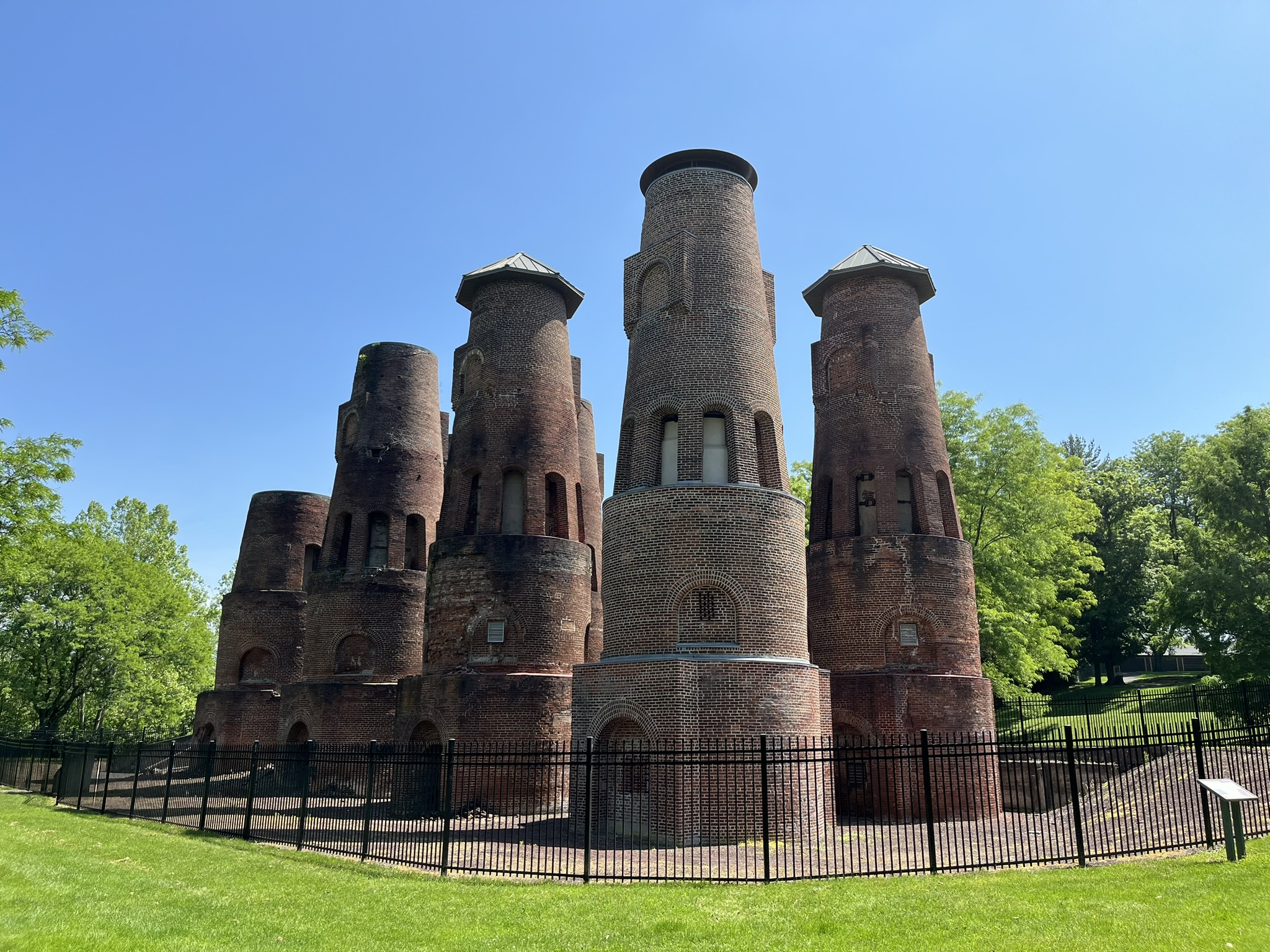
- Coplay Cement Company Kilns in Coplay in May 2024

- Seal

- Location of Coplay in Lehigh County, Pennsylvania (left) and of Lehigh County in Pennsylvania (right)

- Location of Coplay in Pennsylvania Coplay (the United States)
- Coordinates: 40°40′14″N 75°29′43″W
- Country: United States
- State: Pennsylvania
- County: Lehigh

Area
  - Borough: 0.63 sq mi (1.62 km^{2})
  - Land: 0.61 sq mi (1.58 km^{2})
  - Water: 0.015 sq mi (0.04 km^{2})
- Elevation: 400 ft (120 m)

Population (2020)
  - Borough: 3,348
  - Density: 5,486/sq mi (2,118.1/km^{2})
  - Metro: 865,310 (US: 68th)
- Time zone: UTC-5 (EST)
  - Summer (DST): UTC-4 (EDT)
- ZIP code: 18037
- Area codes: 610 and 484
- FIPS code: 42-16128
- Primary airport: Lehigh Valley International Airport
- Major hospital: Lehigh Valley Hospital–Cedar Crest
- School district: Whitehall-Coplay
- Website: www.coplayborough.org

Coplay is a borough in Lehigh County, Pennsylvania, United States. Coplay's population was 3,348 at the 2020 census. It is located six miles (10 km) northwest of Allentown. The borough is part of the Lehigh Valley metropolitan area, which had a population of 861,899 and was the 68th-most populous metropolitan area in the U.S. as of the 2020 census.

== Geography ==
Coplay is located at 40°40′14″N 75°29′43″W (40.670521, -75.495395). According to the U.S. Census Bureau, the borough has a total area of 0.6 square miles (1.6 km^{2}), of which 0.6 square miles (1.6 km^{2}) is land and 0.04 square miles (0.10 km^{2}) (3.08%) is water. Coplay is situated along the Lehigh River, approximately 5 miles (8.0 km) north of Allentown.

== History ==
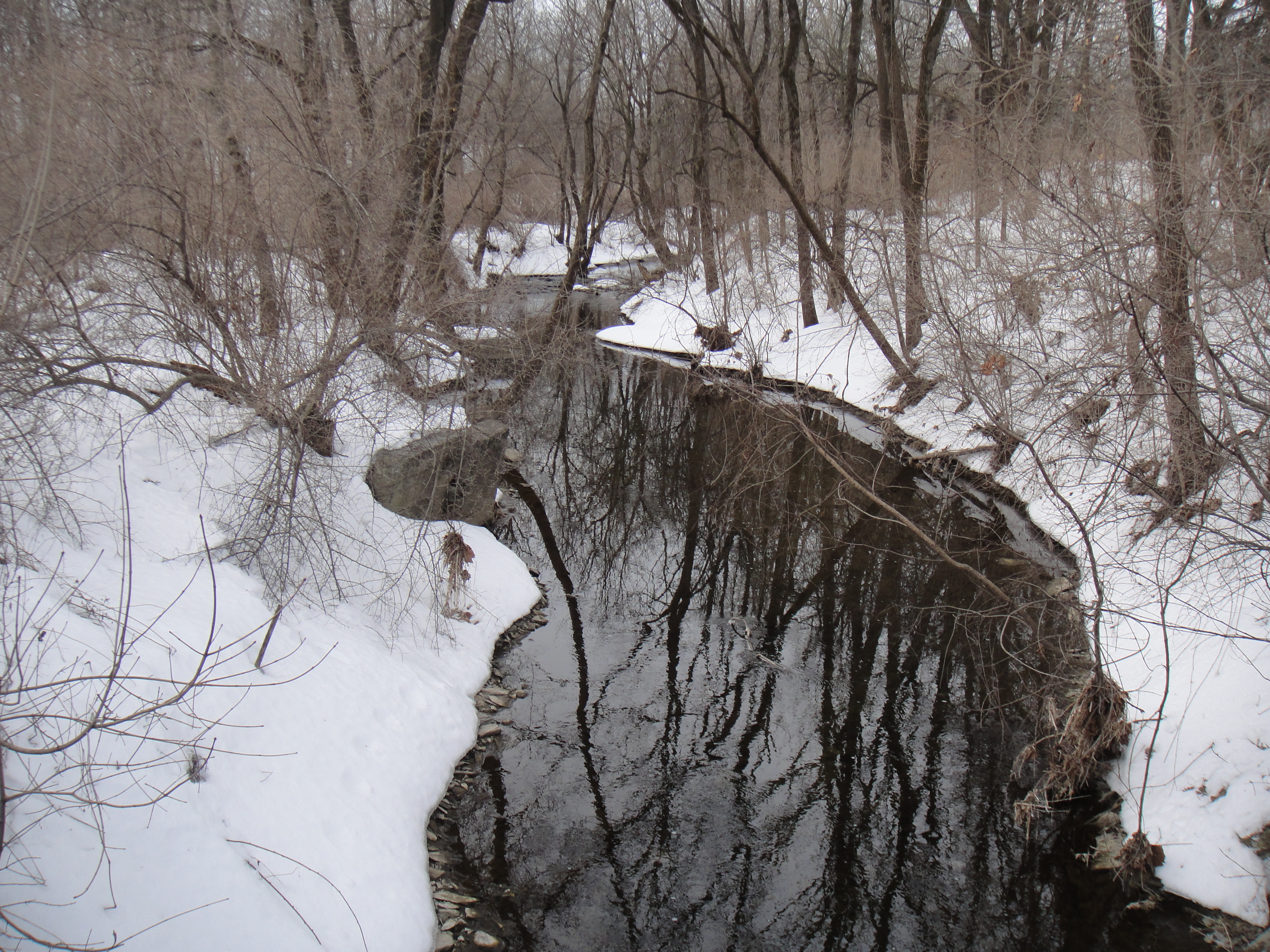
Coplay Creek in March 2014

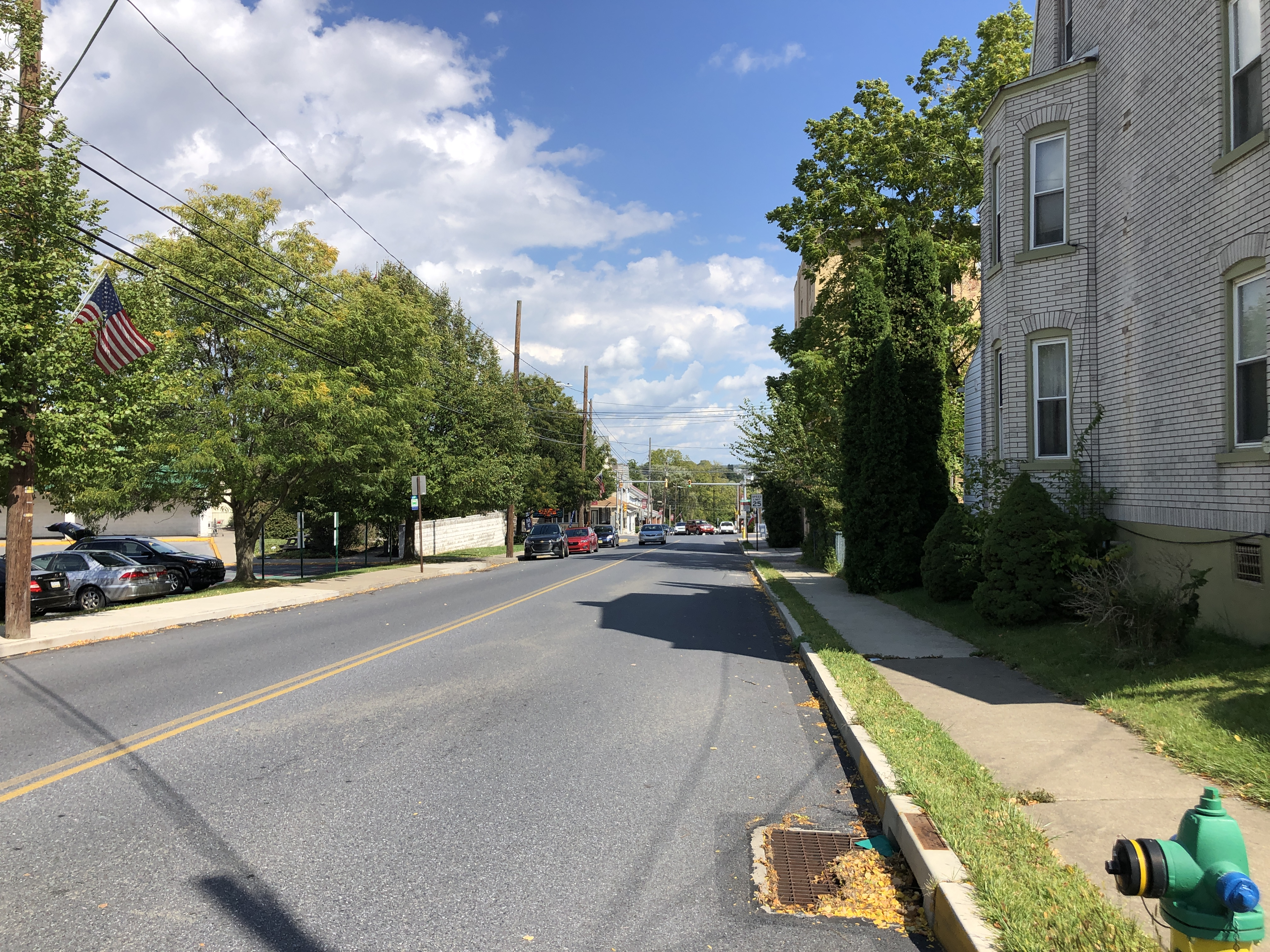
Chestnut Street in Coplay

Coplay was part of the 400 acres (1.6 km^{2}) of land John Jacob Schreiber bought from the William Penn's heirs in 1740. It was initially known as Schreibers and later was known as the Lehigh Valley, because of Lehigh Valley Iron Furnaces were located here. Lehigh Valley was then changed to Coplay, derived from "Kolapechka", the son of the Indian chief Paxanosa, who lived at the head of the creek near Schnecksville. Coplay seceded from Whitehall Township in 1869 and was incorporated as a borough on April 7, 1869.

Coplay gradually changed from a farming area into an industrial community, starting with the founding of the Thomas Iron Company, which attracted laborers and built homes for them. When the Iron Company was liquidated, other industries gradually came to Coplay, including the Cement Mill, the Silk Mill, the Cigar Factory, and Knitting Mill. Coplay became a melting pot of many nationalities. The Pennsylvania Dutch and Germans were initially drawn to the area for its agricultural promise. The growth of the iron industry attracted immigrants from Ireland. Then, in the early 1900s, the Cement Mills attracted immigrants from Austria, Hungary, Czechoslovakia, Poland, and Ukraine.

On April 7, 1969, the borough celebrated its centennial anniversary. A celebration was held from June 15–21 in the town. In 1980, in recognition of historical value, Coplay Cement Company Kilns was added to the National Register of Historic Places.

== Demographics ==
Historical population
| Census | Pop. | Note | %± |
|---|---|---|---|
| 1870 | 728 | | — |
| 1880 | 774 | | 6.3% |
| 1890 | 880 | | 13.7% |
| 1900 | 1,581 | | 79.7% |
| 1910 | 2,670 | | 68.9% |
| 1920 | 2,845 | | 6.6% |
| 1930 | 3,279 | | 15.3% |
| 1940 | 3,109 | | −5.2% |
| 1950 | 2,994 | | −3.7% |
| 1960 | 3,701 | | 23.6% |
| 1970 | 3,642 | | −1.6% |
| 1980 | 3,130 | | −14.1% |
| 1990 | 3,267 | | 4.4% |
| 2000 | 3,387 | | 3.7% |
| 2010 | 3,192 | | −5.8% |
| 2020 | 3,348 | | 4.9% |

=== 2020 census ===
As of the 2020 census, Coplay had a population of 3,348. The median age was 43.6 years. 19.1% of residents were under the age of 18 and 21.2% of residents were 65 years of age or older. For every 100 females there were 92.6 males, and for every 100 females age 18 and over there were 90.2 males age 18 and over.

100.0% of residents lived in urban areas, while 0.0% lived in rural areas.

There were 1,412 households in Coplay, of which 25.7% had children under the age of 18 living in them. Of all households, 40.7% were married-couple households, 19.3% were households with a male householder and no spouse or partner present, and 31.7% were households with a female householder and no spouse or partner present. About 30.8% of all households were made up of individuals and 14.0% had someone living alone who was 65 years of age or older.

There were 1,477 housing units, of which 4.4% were vacant. The homeowner vacancy rate was 0.5% and the rental vacancy rate was 4.9%.

Racial composition as of the 2020 census
| Race | Number | Percent |
|---|---|---|
| White | 2,728 | 81.5% |
| Black or African American | 149 | 4.5% |
| American Indian and Alaska Native | 3 | 0.1% |
| Asian | 52 | 1.6% |
| Native Hawaiian and Other Pacific Islander | 2 | 0.1% |
| Some other race | 152 | 4.5% |
| Two or more races | 262 | 7.8% |
| Hispanic or Latino (of any race) | 420 | 12.5% |

=== 2000 census ===
As of the 2000 census, there were 3,387 people, 1,431 households, and 953 families residing in the borough. The population density was 5,373.1 inhabitants per square mile (2,074.6/km^{2}). There were 1,484 housing units at an average density of 2,354.2 per square mile (909.0/km^{2}). The racial makeup of the borough was 96.84% White, 1.56% African American, 0.09% Native American, 0.32% Asian, 0.53% from other races, and 0.65% from two or more races. Hispanic or Latino of any race were 2.27% of the population. Coplay has the second highest rate of Austrian ancestry in the United States, at 10.6%.

There were 1,431 households, out of which 28.8% had children under the age of 18 living with them, 49.3% were married couples living together, 13.5% had a female householder with no husband present, and 33.4% were non-families. 29.3% of all households were made up of individuals, and 14.4% had someone living alone who was 65 years of age or older. The average household size was 2.34 and the average family size was 2.90.

In the borough, the population was spread out, with 23.0% under the age of 18, 5.3% from 18 to 24, 29.9% from 25 to 44, 20.9% from 45 to 64, and 20.9% who were 65 years of age or older. The median age was 40 years. For every 100 females there were 86.2 males. For every 100 females age 18 and over, there were 83.3 males. The median income for a household in the borough was $38,679, and the median income for a family was $46,278. Males had a median income of $31,519 versus $24,983 for females. The per capita income for the borough was $18,580. About 5.6% of families and 7.0% of the population were below the poverty line, including 13.8% of those under age 18 and 5.3% of those age 65 or over.

United States presidential election results for Coplay, Pennsylvania
| Year | Republican | | Democratic | | Third party(ies) | |
| Year | No. | % | No. | % | No. | % |
|---|---|---|---|---|---|---|
| 2024 | 961 | 52.74% | 840 | 46.10% | 21 | 1.15% |
| 2020 | 874 | 49.80% | 854 | 48.66% | 27 | 1.54% |
| 2016 | 779 | 51.45% | 669 | 44.19% | 66 | 4.36% |
| 2012 | 574 | 41.12% | 801 | 57.38% | 21 | 1.50% |
| 2008 | 563 | 37.43% | 912 | 60.64% | 29 | 1.93% |
| 2004 | 637 | 41.72% | 883 | 57.83% | 7 | 0.46% |

== Education ==
The Borough of Coplay is served by the Whitehall-Coplay School District. Coplay students in grades nine through 12 attend Whitehall High School.

== Transportation ==
As of 2007, there were 11.18 miles (17.99 km) of public roads in Coplay, all of which were maintained by the borough. Main thoroughfares through Coplay include Second Street and Chestnut Street.

== Notable people ==
- Saquon Barkley, professional football player, Philadelphia Eagles
