= Dan Koppen =

American football player (born 1979)

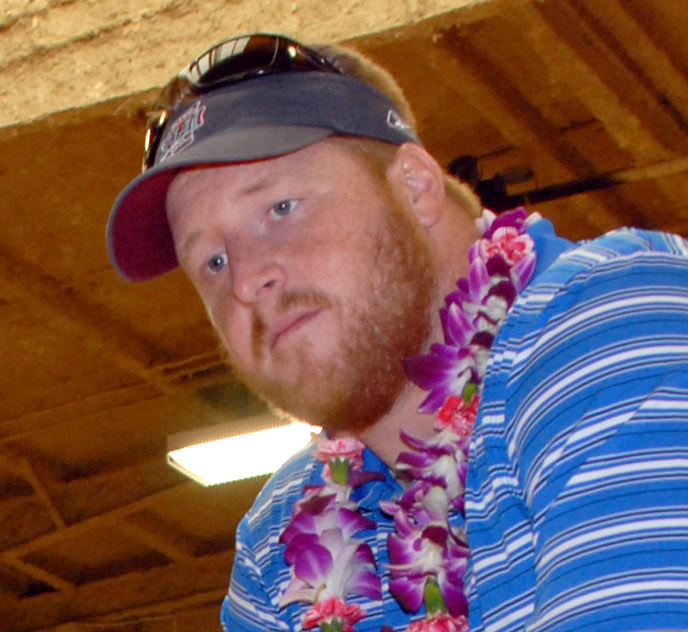
- Koppen in 2008

No. 67
- Position: Center

Personal information
- Born: September 12, 1979 (age 47); Dubuque, Iowa, U.S.
- Listed height: 6 ft 2 in (1.88 m)
- Listed weight: 300 lb (136 kg)

Career information
- High school: Whitehall (Whitehall Township, Pennsylvania)
- College: Boston College (1998–2002)
- NFL draft: 2003: 5th round, 164th overall pick

Career history

Playing
- New England Patriots (2003–2011); Denver Broncos (2012–2013)

Coaching
- Bishop Hendricken HS (RI) (2014–2017) Assistant coach; La Salle Academy (RI) (2023) Head coach

Awards and highlights
- 2× Super Bowl champion (XXXVIII, XXXIX); Second-team All-Pro (2007); Pro Bowl (2007); PFWA All-Rookie Team (2003); New England Patriots All-2000s Team; New England Patriots All-Dynasty Team; Madden Most Valuable Protectors Award (2010); 3× Second-team All-Big East (2000–2002)

Career NFL statistics
- Games played: 136
- Games started: 132
- Fumble recoveries: 6
- Stats at Pro Football Reference

Daniel Koppen (born September 12, 1979) is an American former professional football player who was a center for 10 seasons in the National Football League (NFL) with the New England Patriots and Denver Broncos.

Prior to entering the NFL in 2003, he played college football for the Boston College Eagles.

== Early life ==
Koppen was born in Dubuque, Iowa to Kathy and Mike Koppen. He is the youngest of three children; his siblings are Chris and Leah. He later relocated to the Lehigh Valley region of eastern Pennsylvania, where he attended Whitehall High School in Whitehall Township. The school was then one of 11 large Lehigh Valley high schools (since expanded to 18) that competed in the highly regarded Eastern Pennsylvania Conference, a high school division that has produced a large number of NFL and other professional and Olympic athletes.

At Whitehall, Koppen was a three-sport athlete, lettering in football, basketball, and track and field. As a junior in football, he was a Second-team All-Conference selection as an offensive lineman and defensive end. As a senior, he earned All-Area, All-East Penn Conference, and All-State honors, and was named the Defensive Most Valuable Player in the 1997 Kaylee Rotary Bowl. He was also a Prep Star All-American and a Big 33 selection in 1998, his senior season, in which he recorded 10 sacks on defense and scored eight touchdowns on offense. He also was selected to play in the 1998 McDonald's Lehigh Valley All-Star Classic game.

Whitehall High School later permanently retired Koppen's Whitehall jersey number (#77) in honor of his high school, collegiate, and NFL football accomplishments. In 2010, Koppen also was inducted into Whitehall High School's Hall of Fame.

== College career ==
Koppen attended Boston College, where he was a three-year starter at center for the Boston College Eagles football team. After spending his freshman season in 1999 as a reserve, Koppen closed out his sophomore year in the 2000 season with Second-team All-Big East Conference honors, was named to the Rimington Trophy watch list in 2001, and started every game at center and was named a Second-team All-Big East Conference selection for a second time in 2001.

As a senior in the 2002 season, Koppen was a finalist for the Rimington Trophy, which honors the best offensive center in college football, and received Second-team All-Big East honors for a third consecutive season.

== Professional career ==
Pre-draft measurables
Height	Weight	Arm length	Hand span	40-yard dash	10-yard split	20-yard split	20-yard shuttle	Three-cone drill	Vertical jump	Broad jump	Bench press
6 ft 2 5/8 in (1.90 m)	297 lb (135 kg)	31 3/8 in (0.80 m)	8 1/2 in (0.22 m)	5.28 s	1.80 s	3.02 s	4.56 s	8.26 s	28.5 in (0.72 m)	8 ft 5 in (2.57 m)	27 reps
All values from NFL Combine

=== New England Patriots ===
Koppen entered the 2003 NFL draft following college and was selected by the New England Patriots in the fifth round with the 164th overall selection. Koppen entered the 2003 season as the backup to Pro Bowl center Damien Woody; however, when Woody missed Week 2 with an injury, Koppen was given the opportunity to start his first NFL game for the Patriots. Woody returned the next week. But, following a season-ending injury to starting guard Mike Compton, the Patriots moved Woody to offensive guard and Koppen started the remainder of the 2003 season at center, including in the Patriots' Super Bowl XXXVIII win over the Carolina Panthers. Following the season, Woody signed with the Detroit Lions, leaving Koppen as the Patriots' starting center. Koppen started all 16 games for the Patriots in 2004, where he was a member of the Patriots' 2004 Super Bowl-winning team, in which the Patriots defeated the Philadelphia Eagles in Super Bowl XXXIX on February 6, 2005.

After starting the first nine games in the 2005 season, Koppen was derailed by a shoulder injury he sustained in a November 13 game against the Miami Dolphins. He was placed on injured reserve following the game.

In the 2006 season, however, Koppen returned to his role as the Patriots' starting center. On October 12, 2006, the Patriots announced they had signed Koppen to a five-year, $20 million contract extension. Koppen finished the 2006 season starting each of the Patriots' 16 regular season games. In the 2006 season, Koppen allowed only two sacks and committing only two penalties for the entire season.

In 2007, Koppen missed one game due to a foot injury, but started the other 15 games. For the 2007 season, he did not allow a single sack and helped lead the Patriots to the only perfect 16–0 season in NFL history. The following season, in 2008, Koppen was selected as a starter in the 2008 Pro Bowl, his first appearance in the game.

In both the 2009 and 2010 season, Koppen started all 16 games for each season. In the 2009 season, he was a member of an offensive line that allowed the fewest sacks (18) by a Patriots offensive line since the NFL's 1978 move to a 16-game schedule.

In August 2007, Patriots head coach Bill Belichick said the following of Koppen:

Seeing the front seven, even sometimes the secondary rotation on a particular play...he does that very well and is on the same page with our quarterback...He's really good at that, probably as good as anybody I've ever coached.

Koppen was named to the Patriots' All-Decade team for 2000s in 2010. In 2010, Koppen also again started all 16 games for the Patriots.

In a Week 1 matchup in the 2011 season against the Miami Dolphins, Koppen fractured his ankle. On September 21, he was placed on injured reserve.

Koppen was released on August 31, 2012, during the Patriots' final roster cuts prior to the 2012 season.

For eight of Tom Brady's 20 years as Patriots' quarterback, Koppen was the Patriots' offensive center responsible for snapping him the ball.

=== Denver Broncos ===
Two weeks after being released by the Patriots, on September 10, 2012, Koppen agreed to a one-year deal with the Denver Broncos. On July 28, 2013, Koppen suffered a torn ACL during training camp and missed the entire 2013 season. He announced his retirement from the NFL following the 2013 season.

=== NFL legacy ===
In addition to being a member of two Super Bowl-winning teams with the New England Patriots and being named to the Pro Bowl in 2007, Koppen is believed to be the only NFL offensive center ever to have snapped to two of the most successful quarterbacks in NFL history, Tom Brady, during Koppen's 2003 to 2011 career with the Patriots, and Peyton Manning, during Koppen's career with the Broncos in 2012 and 2013.

== Post-NFL career ==
Koppen announced his NFL retirement following the 2013 season and was hired as an analyst for NBC Sports Boston.

In March 2014, Koppen was hired as assistant football coach at Bishop Hendricken High School in Warwick, Rhode Island. In November 2018, he opened Linesider Brewery in East Greenwich, Rhode Island. The brewery closed in 2024. In February 2025, Koppen was hired as the football head coach at La Salle Academy in Providence, Rhode Island.

== Personal life ==
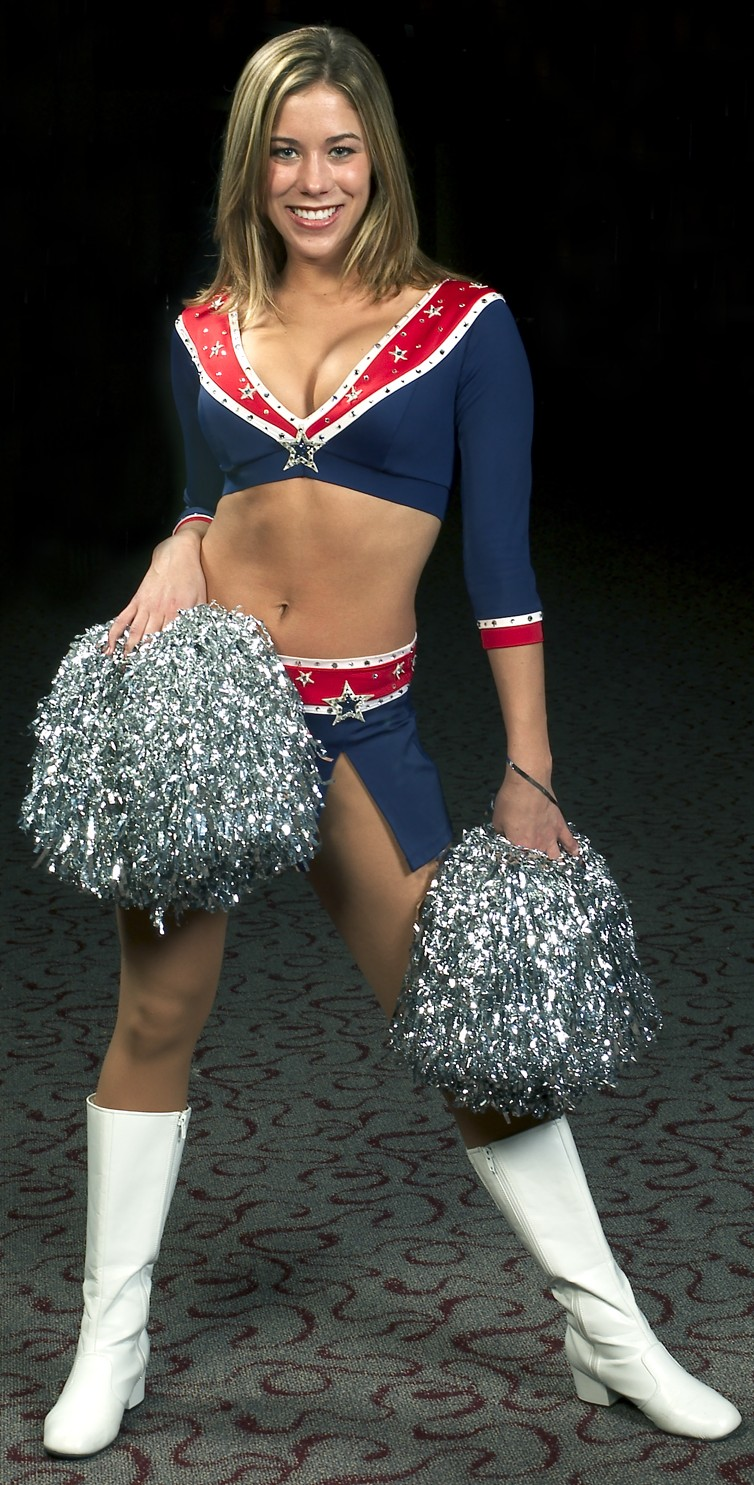
Amber Van Eeghen, Koppen's wife, was a New England Patriots Cheerleader for four seasons from 2002 until 2005

In 2007, Koppen was engaged to Amber Van Eeghen, a former New England Patriots Cheerleader and the daughter of Mark van Eeghen, a former running back for the Oakland Raiders and New England Patriots. They married in 2009 and have three children.
