= Whitehall Township, Pennsylvania =

Township in Pennsylvania, US

Whitehall Township
- Township
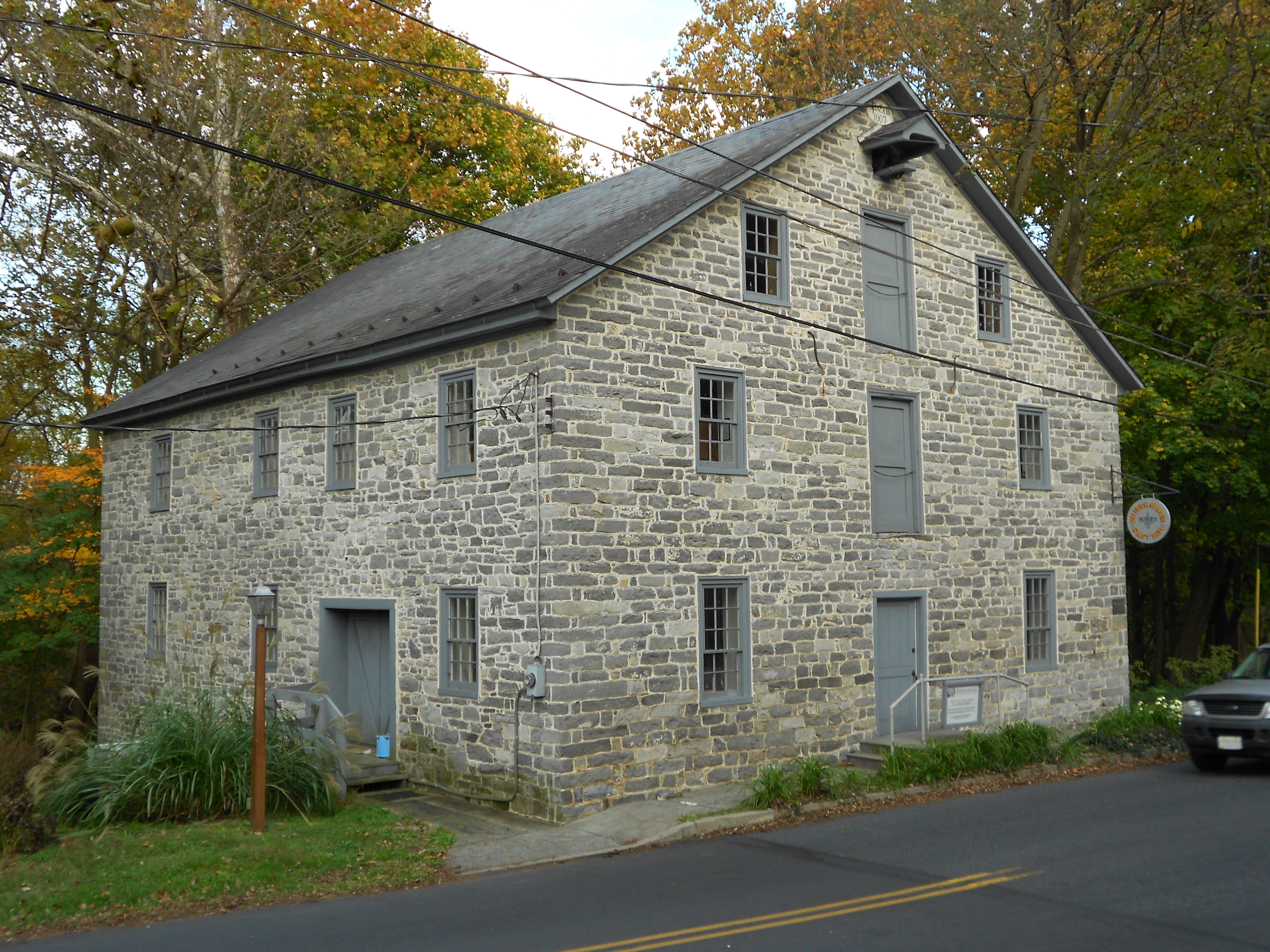
- Helfrich's Springs Grist Mill, built in 1807 in Whitehall Township, in October 2012

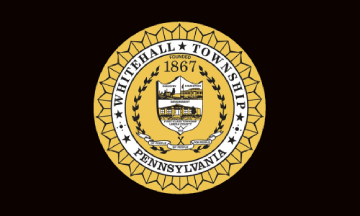
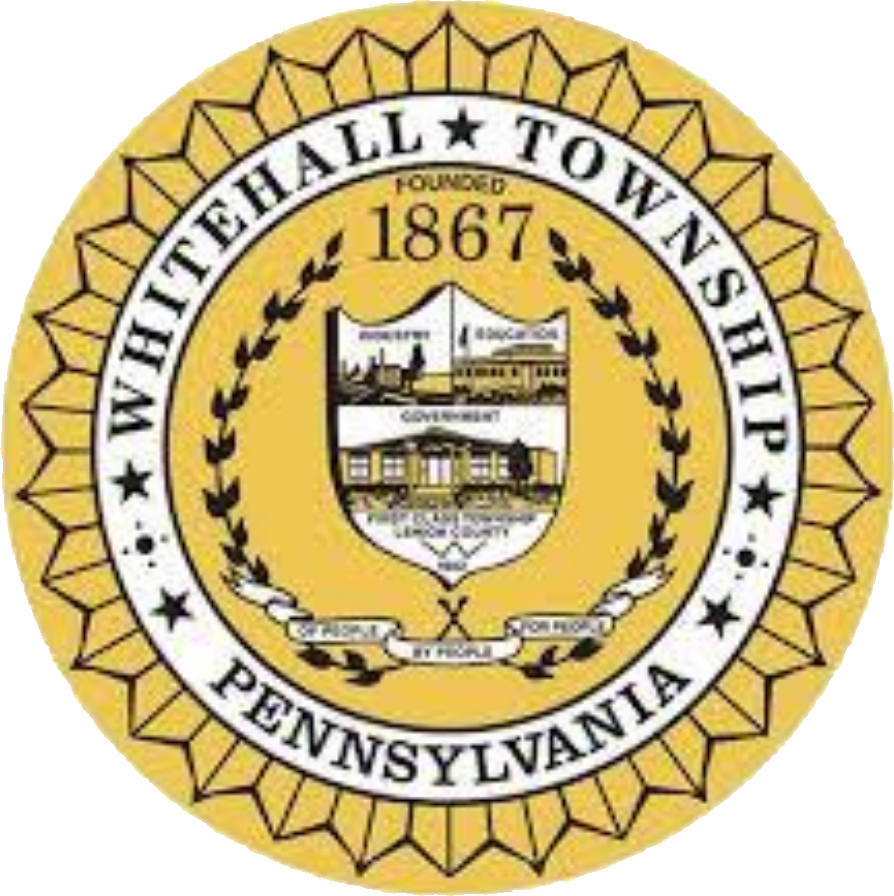
- Flag Seal

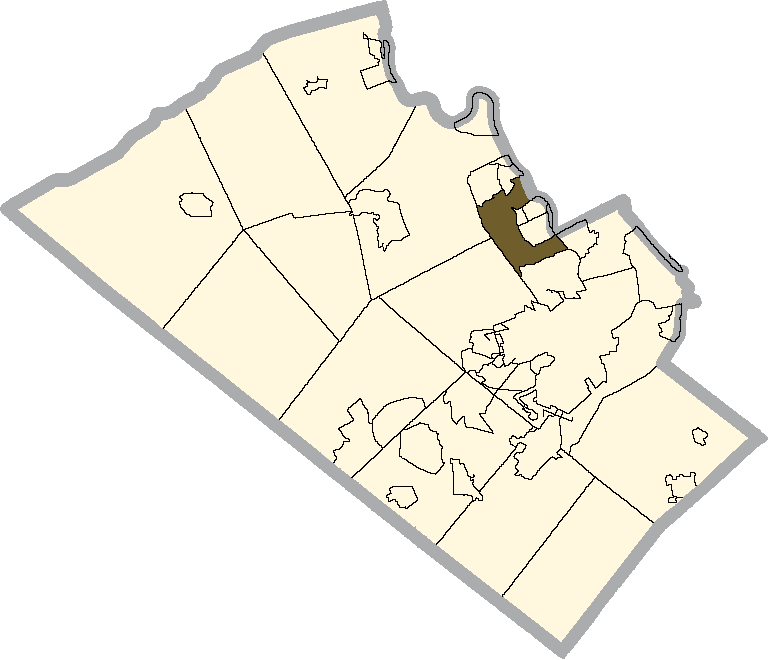
- Location of Whitehall Township in Lehigh County, Pennsylvania

- Location of Whitehall Township in Pennsylvania Location in the United States
- Coordinates: 40°40′00″N 75°30′00″W
- Country: United States
- State: Pennsylvania
- County: Lehigh

Government
  - Mayor: Joseph J. Marx, Jr. (Democratic)

Area
  - Township: 12.86 sq mi (33.31 km^{2})
  - Land: 12.57 sq mi (32.55 km^{2})
  - Water: 0.29 sq mi (0.76 km^{2})
- Elevation: 384 ft (117 m)

Population (2010)
  - Township: 26,738
  - Estimate (2016): 27,423
  - Density: 2,181.9/sq mi (842.43/km^{2})
  - Metro: 865,310 (US: 68th)
- Time zone: UTC-5 (EST)
  - Summer (DST): UTC-4 (EDT)
- ZIP code: 18052
- Area codes: 610 and 484
- FIPS code: 42-077-84528
- Primary airport: Lehigh Valley International Airport
- Major hospital: Lehigh Valley Hospital–Cedar Crest
- School district: Whitehall-Coplay
- Website: www.whitehalltownship.org

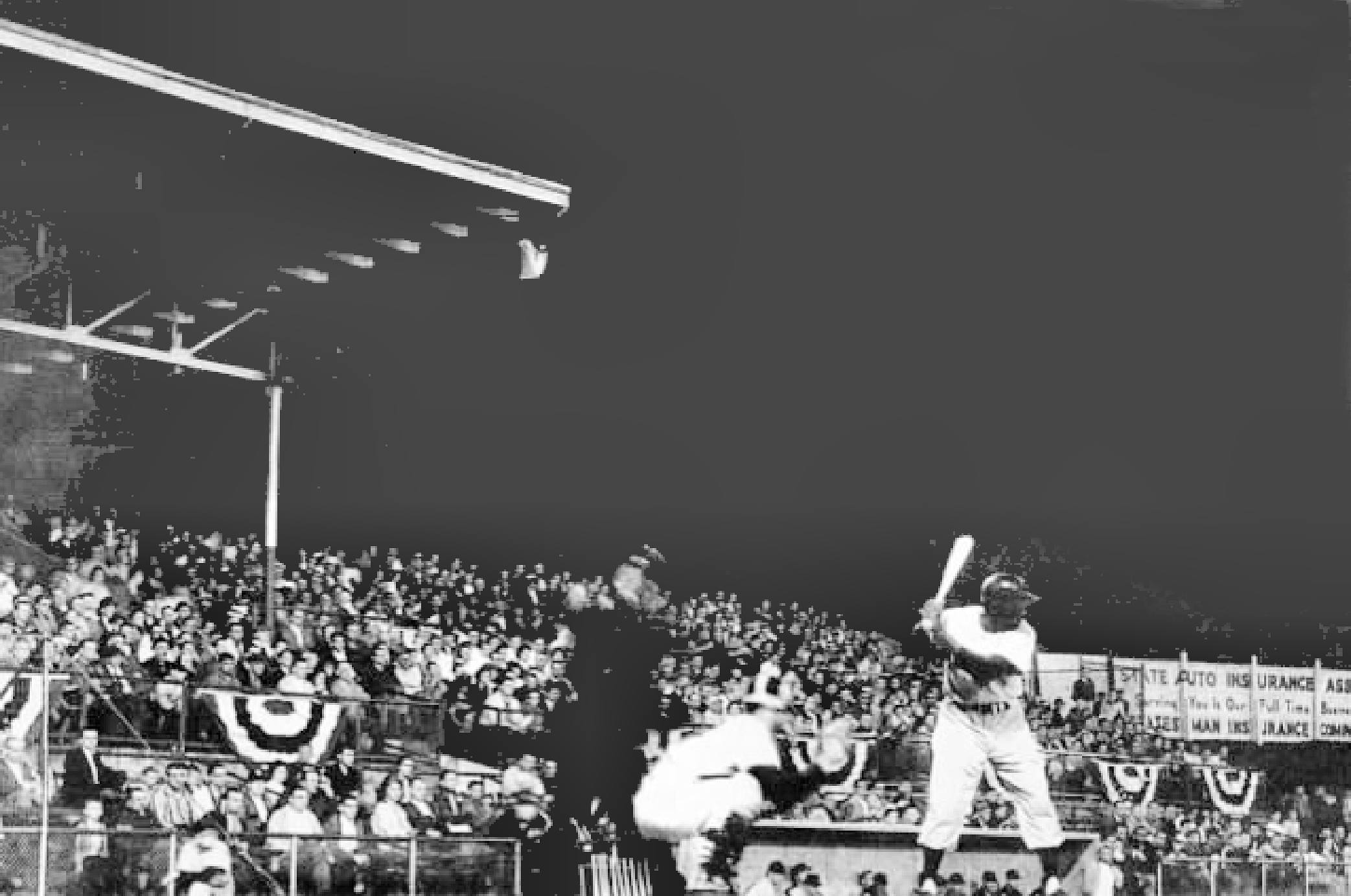
Breadon Field, which was home to three Minor League Baseball teams during its existence, was based in Whitehall Township from 1948 until its 1964 demolition.

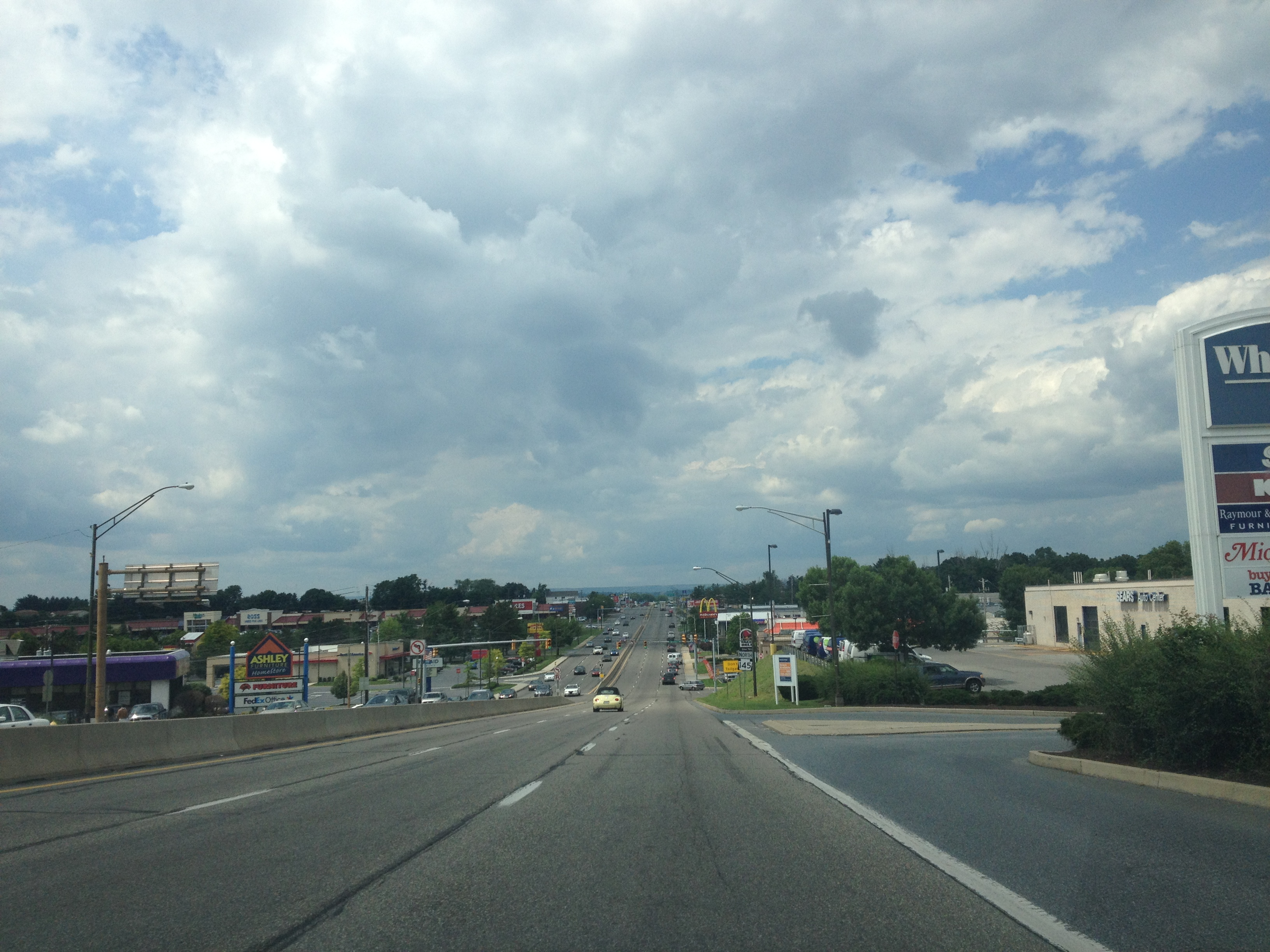
MacArthur Road's retail corridor in Whitehall Township in June 2015

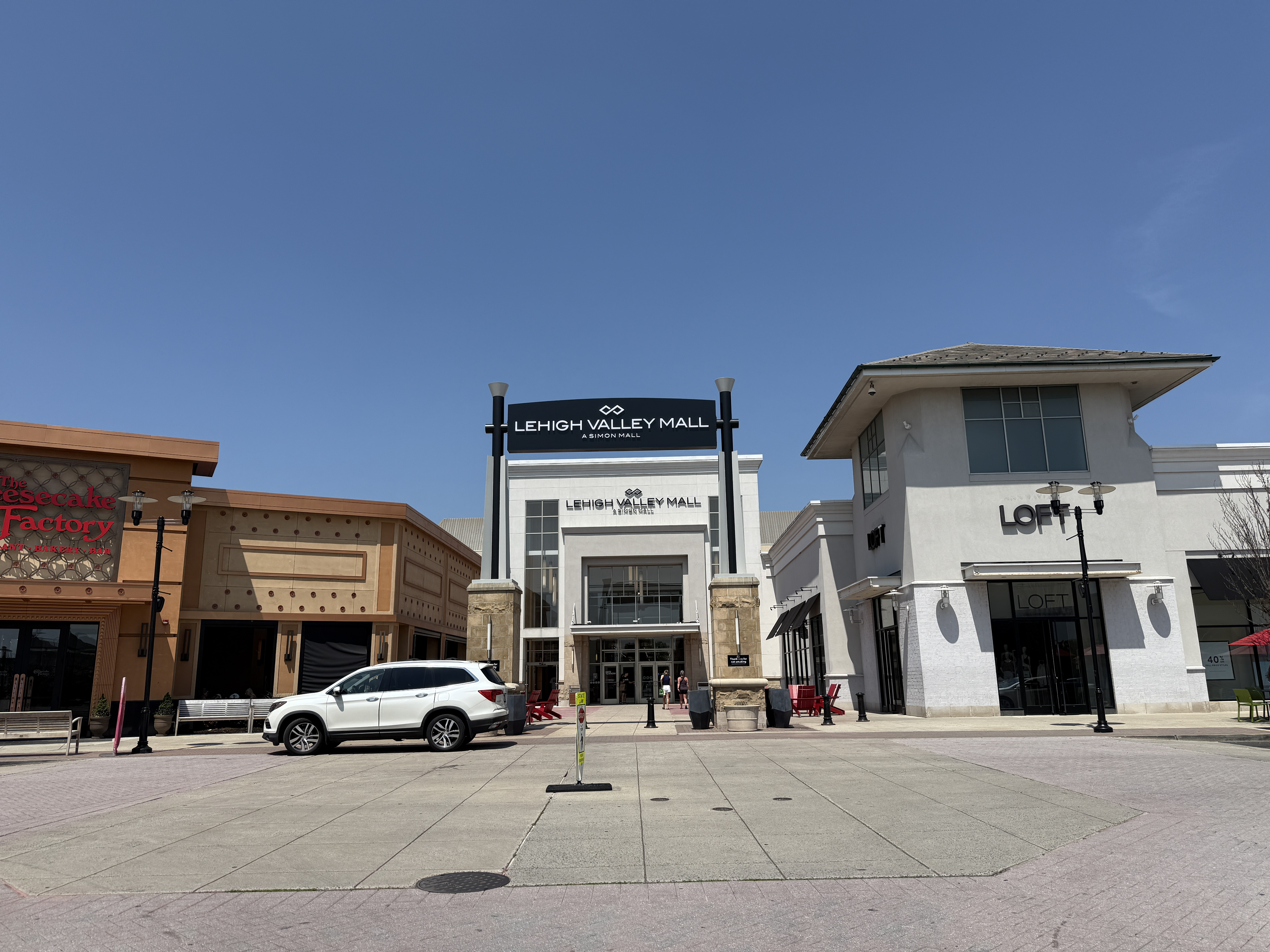
Lehigh Valley Mall in Whitehall Township in June 2025

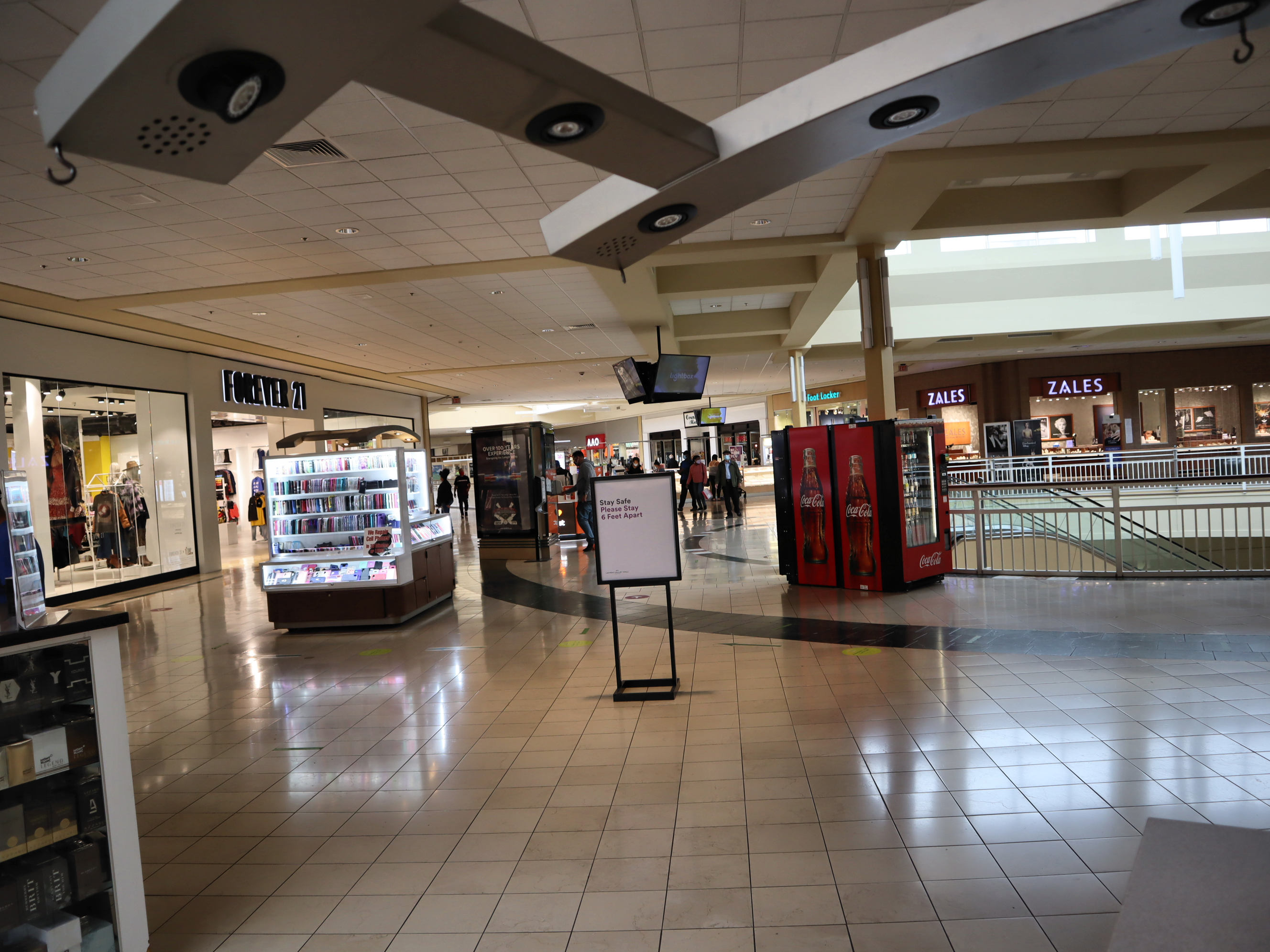
Lehigh Valley Mall's second floor interior, in Whitehall Township in October 2020

Whitehall Township is a township with home rule status in Lehigh County, Pennsylvania, United States. The township's population was 29,173 as of the 2020 census.

Whitehall Township is a suburb of Allentown in the Lehigh Valley metropolitan region, which had a population of 861,899 and was the 68th-most populous metropolitan area in the U.S. as of the 2020 census.

The township is 4.4 miles (7.1 km) north of Allentown, 64.1 miles (103.2 km) northwest of Philadelphia, and 93.7 miles (150.8 km) west of New York City.

== History ==
The Province of Pennsylvania was created in 1681 when King Charles II granted a charter of land in America to William Penn.

=== 18th century ===
After the death of Penn, his sons, John, Thomas, and Richard, became the owners of Pennsylvania. The Lenape Indian tribe deeded that part of Lehigh County lying between the South Mountain and Blue Mountain to Penn's sons in 1736.

A wave of German immigrants from Germany's Palatinate settled in Whitehall Township. The first was Jacob Kohler, who settled in the vicinity of Egypt about 1728. The settlers staked their claim on the lands by applying to the Penns for a land warrant. They cleared the land for farming and established churches around which villages grew.

When the first European settlers came to the Whitehall area, the Lenape people were living on the banks of Hokendauqua Creek. The Europeans and the Lenape designed a deal to determine how much land the Europeans would acquire based on how far the Europeans were able to walk in two days. To gain more land, the Europeans paid a professional runner who got as far as what is now Coaldale, in Schuylkill County.

The Lenape lived peacefully among the German settlers for a time. But the tribe suffered injustices at the hands of the settlers and lashed back during a 1763 uprising in Lehigh County. Fort Deshler, which stood near Route 145 at Chestnut Street, played a key role in the defense of settler-held lands during this battle, in which 23 settlers were killed.

=== 19th century ===
The original Whitehall Township, established in 1753, was split into the three townships of Whitehall, North Whitehall, and South Whitehall in 1867. The name Whitehall is said to have originated from Lynford Lardner's hunting lodge that was painted with whitewash. Lardner named it "Grouse Hall", but the common people of the region called it "White Hall". Whitehall Township's villages include Cementon, Egypt, Fullerton, Hokendauqua, Mickleys, Stiles, and West Catasauqua. Coplay was also part of Whitehall until it incorporated as a borough in 1869. Agriculture was the major industry until the mid-1800s. Today, about 2,000 acres (809 ha) are under cultivation. There were six grist mills in Whitehall, built to process grains for the farmers into flour and animal feed. Only one grist mill remains, the Helfrich Springs Grist Mill, which is also home to the Whitehall Historical Preservation Society, which has preserved the building for use as a local history museum.

Completion of the Lehigh Canal in 1829 led to further development. Discovery of iron ore deposits brought Whitehall into the Industrial Revolution when the first blast iron furnace was built in Hokendauqua in 1854. This was immediately followed by the establishment of a railroad system to transport raw materials to the furnaces and to ship the final product. Population grew rapidly as these industries attracted Welsh and Irish immigrants.

While the railroads were being constructed, cuts in the bedrock led to the discovery of Whitehall's deposits of Jacksonburg limestone. David O. Saylor perfected and patented the process of manufacturing Portland cement. The first Portland cement plant was located between the villages of Cementon and Coplay. Others quickly followed, and by 1914 70% of the cement produced in the United States came from the "Cement Belt" or Lehigh District. The cement industry attracted a new wave of immigrants from Austria-Hungary, creating yet another population spurt.

=== 20th century ===
Whitehall became classified as a first class township with a population of 7,935 in 1900. This gave the township specified municipal rights for supplying electric lights, highways, and sewers at public expense. The post-World War II era began the transition from the manufacturing industries to the retail industry as Whitehall became a bedroom community and suburb of Allentown. The individual villages united into a single entity known as Whitehall in 1968, when the U.S. Post Office combined its separate town branches. Breadon Field, which was the home field for a series of Minor League Baseball teams from the stadium's 1948 opening until its 1964 demolition, was based in Whitehall Township.

In 1974, voters approved the adoption of a Home Rule Charter form of government, creating a seven-member legislative body and an elected mayor. Today, with an annual budget in excess of $21 million, Whitehall provides a full range of municipal services to its residents.

== Geography ==
Whitehall Township is in eastern Lehigh County on the north side of the city of Allentown. According to the U.S. Census Bureau, the township has a total area of 12.9 square miles (33.3 km^{2}), of which 12.6 square miles (32.6 km^{2}) are land and 0.3 square miles (0.7 km^{2}), or 2.22%, are water. Whitehall is drained by the Lehigh River, which forms the eastern boundary of the township, separating it from the boroughs of Northampton and North Catasauqua in Northampton County and the borough of Catasauqua in Lehigh County.

The township was originally created on March 20, 1753, and included what is now North Whitehall and South Whitehall townships. In 1810, a petition was made to the Northampton County Court to split the township into two portions; at the time, the area now encompassed by Lehigh County was part of Northampton County. The name "Whitehall" refers to a white hall that was built along Jordan Creek in the early 1700s as a hunting lodge. The area had a large ruffed grouse population along with numerous white-tailed deer, eastern elk, eastern wolves, and black bear. Mountain lions or cougars may have also existed within Whitehall Township at some point in time. Because of the rich biodiversity of the area it became known as the wilderness of Whitehall. Old-growth forest consisting of oak, tulip poplar, hickory, black walnut, sugar maple, basswood, American chestnut, American beech, and sycamore covered the entire township.

In 1867, eastern portions of both North and South Whitehall were reapportioned into the current Whitehall Township. The new Whitehall Township is generally rectangular in shape, running from north-northwest to south-southeast, and is situated along the western bank of the Lehigh River. Two years after the new township's formation, the borough of Coplay was incorporated, removing from the township a square section of 0.6 square miles (1.6 km^{2}).

The township's villages include Cementon, Eagle Point, Egypt, Fullerton, Hokendauqua, Mickleys, North Coplay, Scherersville (also in South Whitehall), Stiles, and West Catasauqua.

=== Adjacent municipalities ===
- Catasauqua (east)
- Hanover Township (southeast)
- Allentown (south)
- South Whitehall Township (southwest)
- North Whitehall Township (northwest)
- Allen Township, Northampton County (tangent to the northeast)
- Northampton, Northampton County (northeast)
- Coplay (east)
- North Catasauqua, Northampton County (east)

=== Climate ===
Whitehall Township has a hot-summer humid continental climate (Dfa) and the hardiness zone is 6b. Average monthly temperatures in Hokendauqua range from 28.8 °F (−1.8 °C) in January to 73.8 °F (23.2 °C) in July.

== Demographics ==
Historical population
Census	Pop.	Note	%±
2000	24,896		—
2010	26,738		7.4%
2020	29,173		9.1%

As of the census of 2010, there were 29,173 people, 11,607 households, and 6,817 families residing in the township. The population density was 1,981.1 inhabitants per square mile (764.9/km^{2}). There were 10,744 housing units at an average density of 855.0 units per square mile (330.1 units/km^{2}). The racial makeup of the township was 90.56% White, 2.74% African American, 0.13% Native American, 3.62% Asian, 0.06% Pacific Islander, 1.71% from other races, and 1.18% from two or more races. Hispanic or Latino of any race were 4.37% of the population.

There were 10,376 households, out of which 27.0% had children under the age of 18 living with them, 53.3% were married couples living together, 8.8% had a female householder with no husband present, and 34.3% were non-families. 28.6% of all households were made up of individuals, and 52% had someone living alone who was 65 years of age or older. The average household size was 2.37 and the average family size was 2.93.

In the township, the population was spread out, with 21.2% under the age of 18, 7.3% from 18 to 24, 30.6% from 25 to 44, 22.7% from 45 to 64, and 18.1% who were 65 years of age or older. The median age was 40 years. For every 100 females, there were 92.0 males. For every 100 females age 18 and over, there were 89.3 males. The median income for a household in the township was $43,070, and the median income for a family was $51,597. Males had a median income of $39,175 versus $26,933 for females. The per capita income for the township was $21,383. About 4.4% of families and 6.5% of the population were below the poverty line, including 8.7% of those under age 18 and 7.0% of those age 65 or over.

== Education ==
Whitehall-Coplay School District serves the township and also the borough of Coplay. Students in grades 9–12 from both municipalities attend Whitehall High School.

There also are several parochial and private schools within the Township:

- Good Shepherd Catholic School (K-8)
- Lehigh Valley Lutheran School (K-8)
- Lehigh Valley Seventh-day Adventist School (K-8)
- St. Elizabeth Regional School (K-8)
- St. Stephens School (PK-K)
- Manarah Islamic Academy (PK-5)

== Historic sites ==
The Dent Hardware Company Factory Complex in Fullerton and Helfrich's Springs Grist Mill in the township are listed on the National Register of Historic Places.

== Businesses ==
The Lehigh Valley Mall, the largest Lehigh Valley-based shopping mall, is located in Whitehall Township, as is the Whitehall Plaza shopping center.

Several radio stations have broadcast facilities within the township (all owned by iHeartMedia), including:

- WAEB (AM) (790 AM), Talk radio
- WAEB (FM) (104.1 FM), Top 40
- WSAN (1470 AM), Sports radio
- WZZO (95.1 FM), Rock music

== Government ==
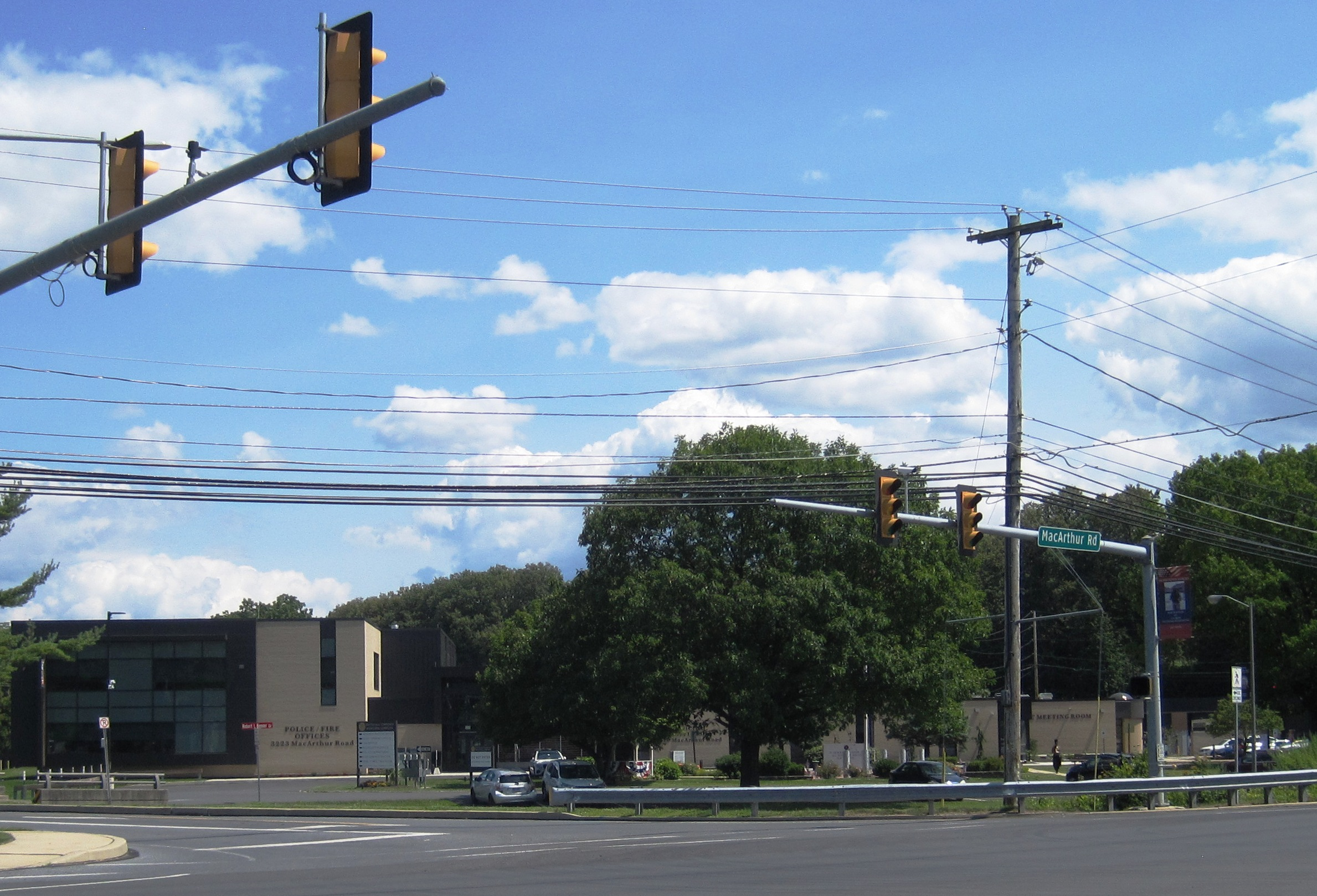
Whitehall Municipal Building

As of 2025, Whitehall Township is represented by the following federal, state, county, and township officials:

=== Federal ===
==== U.S. Senate ====
- John Fetterman (Democrat (D) (through 2028)
- Dave McCormick (Republican (R) (through 2031)

==== U.S. House ====
- Ryan Mackenzie (R), Pennsylvania's 7th congressional district (through 2027)

=== State ===
==== State Senate ====
- Nick Miller (D), 14th State Senate District

==== State House ====
- Jeanne McNeill (D) (through 2027), 133rd State House district

=== County ===
==== County executive ====
- Josh Siegel (D) (2026 to 2030)

==== County commissioners ====
- 1st County District, Antonio Pineda
- At Large commissioners:
  - Sheila Alvarado
  - Dan Hartzell
  - Jon Irons
  - April Riddick

=== Township ===
==== Mayor ====
- Joseph J. Marx, Jr. (D) (2024 to 2027)

==== Treasurer ====
- Tina Koren (R) (2022 to present)

==== Commissioners ====
- Jeffrey J. Warren (D) president (2024 to 2028)
- Thomas Slonaker (D) vice president (D) (2026 to 20230)
- Randy Atiyeh (D), secretary, (2024 to 2028)
- Taylor Stakes (D) (2026 to 2030)
- Elizabeth Fox (R) (2024 to 2028)
- Lee Christman (R) (2026 to 2030)
- Kenneth Snyder Jr. (D) (2024 to 2028)

United States presidential election results for Whitehall Township, Pennsylvania
Year	Republican		Democratic		Third party(ies)	
Year	No.	%	No.	%	No.	%
2024	7,414	50.52%	7,069	48.17%	193	1.32%
2020	6,783	47.05%	7,500	52.02%	135	0.94%
2016	6,008	48.53%	5,952	48.08%	419	3.38%
2012	5,002	44.42%	6,107	54.24%	151	1.34%
2008	4,766	40.48%	6,832	58.03%	175	1.49%
2004	5,228	45.48%	6,178	53.74%	90	0.78%

== Police ==
Whitehall Township Bureau of Police

Agency overview
- Formed: 1946; 80 years ago
- Employees: 59

Jurisdictional structure
- Area: 12.86 sq mi (33.31 km^{2})
- Population: 26,738 (2010)

Operational structure
- Overseen by: Department of Public Safety
- Headquarters: 3223 MacArthur Rd, Whitehall, PA 18052
- officers: 50
- civilians: 9
- Elected officer responsible: Joseph J. Marx, Jr., Mayor
- Agency executives: Michael Marks, Chief of Police; Mark Mazzitelli, Deputy Chief of Police

Website
- http://www.whitehalltownship.org/police_about.html

Whitehall Township Bureau of Police is a medium-sized city police force. The first police patrolmen were hire in 1905, and the current police department was formed in 1946. Since then, has been ensuring law and order in the township.

Whitehall Township Bureau of Police rank structure
Title	Insignia
Chief of Police	
Deputy Chief of Police	
Lieutenant	
Detective Sergeant	
Sergeant	
Officer	

== Transportation ==
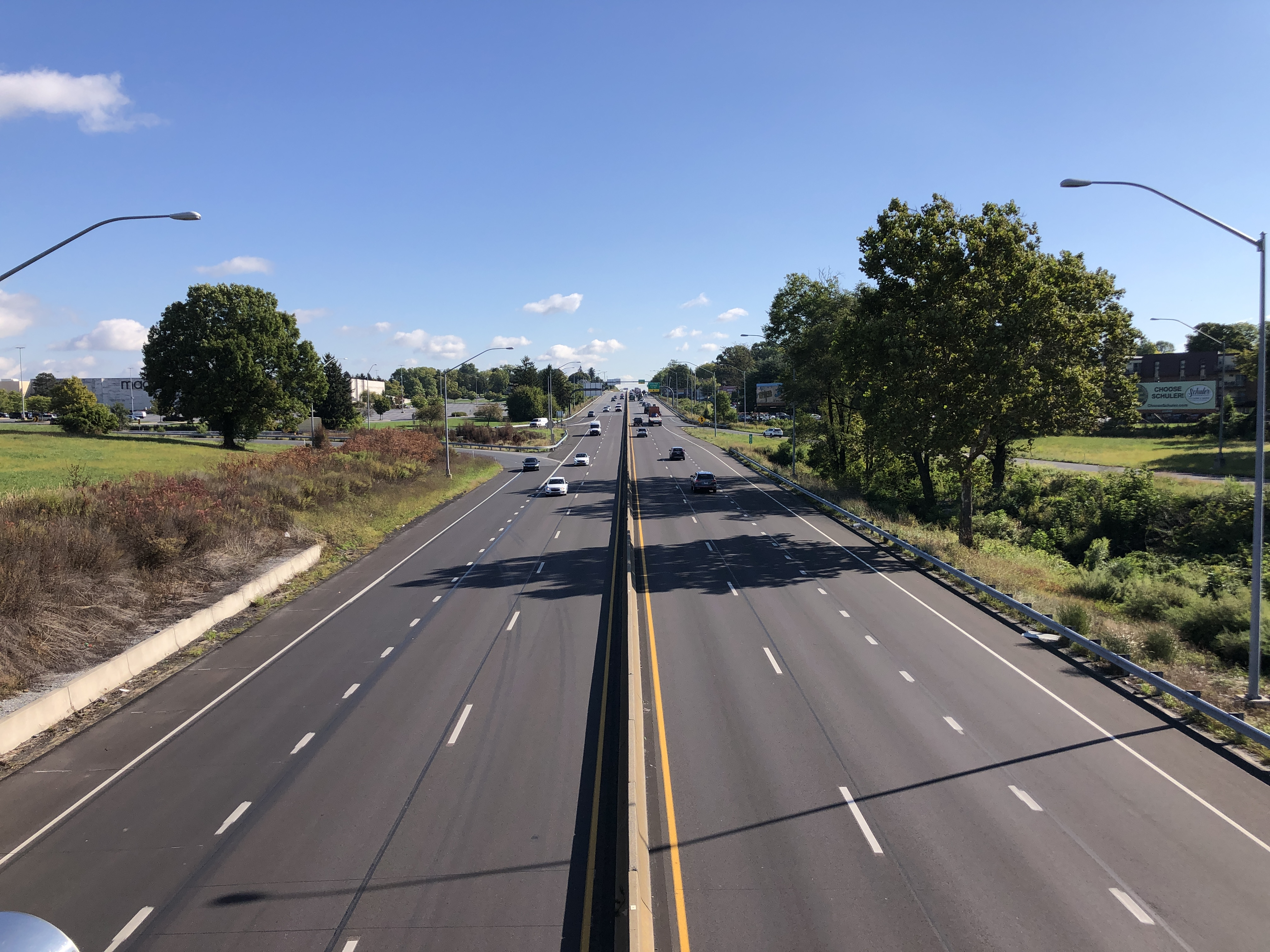
US 22 East in Whitehall Township in September 2022

=== Highways and roads ===
As of 2018, there were 120.85 miles (194.49 km) of public roads in Whitehall Township, 23.25 miles (37.42 km) of which were maintained by the state's Department of Transportation (PennDOT), and 97.60 miles (157.07 km) of which are maintained by the township.

The township's main north–south road is MacArthur Road (PA 145), which has an interchange with US 22 in the south and crosses PA 329 in the north. PA 145 heads south into Allentown and north to Walnutport. US 22 passes east–west through the southern portion of Whitehall Township on a freeway called the Lehigh Valley Thruway, with interchanges at PA 145 and Fullerton Avenue. US 22 leads west to connections with PA 309, I-476, also known as the Pennsylvania Turnpike Northeast Extension, and I-78 and east to Bethlehem and Easton. PA 329 passes east–west through the northern portion of Whitehall Township on Main Street, leading west to Schnecksville and east to Northampton and Bath.

=== Public bus service ===
LANta provides bus service in Whitehall Township with several routes serving the MacArthur Road retail corridor. The bus routes connect the township with Allentown, Bethlehem, and other points in the Lehigh Valley. The transit center at the Lehigh Valley Mall moved because the mall requested LANta to move due to safety concerns.

== Notable people ==
- Afa Anoa'i, former professional wrestler
- Saquon Barkley, professional football player, Philadelphia Eagles
- Walt Groller, former polka musician
- Brian Knobbs, former professional wrestler
- Dan Koppen, former professional football player, Denver Broncos and New England Patriots
- Patrick Maggitti, first provost of Villanova University and dean of the Villanova School of Business
- Matt Millen, former professional football player, Oakland Raiders, San Francisco 49ers and Washington Redskins, former president and General Manager, Detroit Lions
- Jerry Sags, former professional wrestler
- Curt Simmons, former professional baseball player, California Angels, Chicago Cubs, Philadelphia Phillies, and St. Louis Cardinals
