= Coplay Creek =

Stream in Pennsylvania, USA

Coordinates: 40.65475°N 75.49461°W

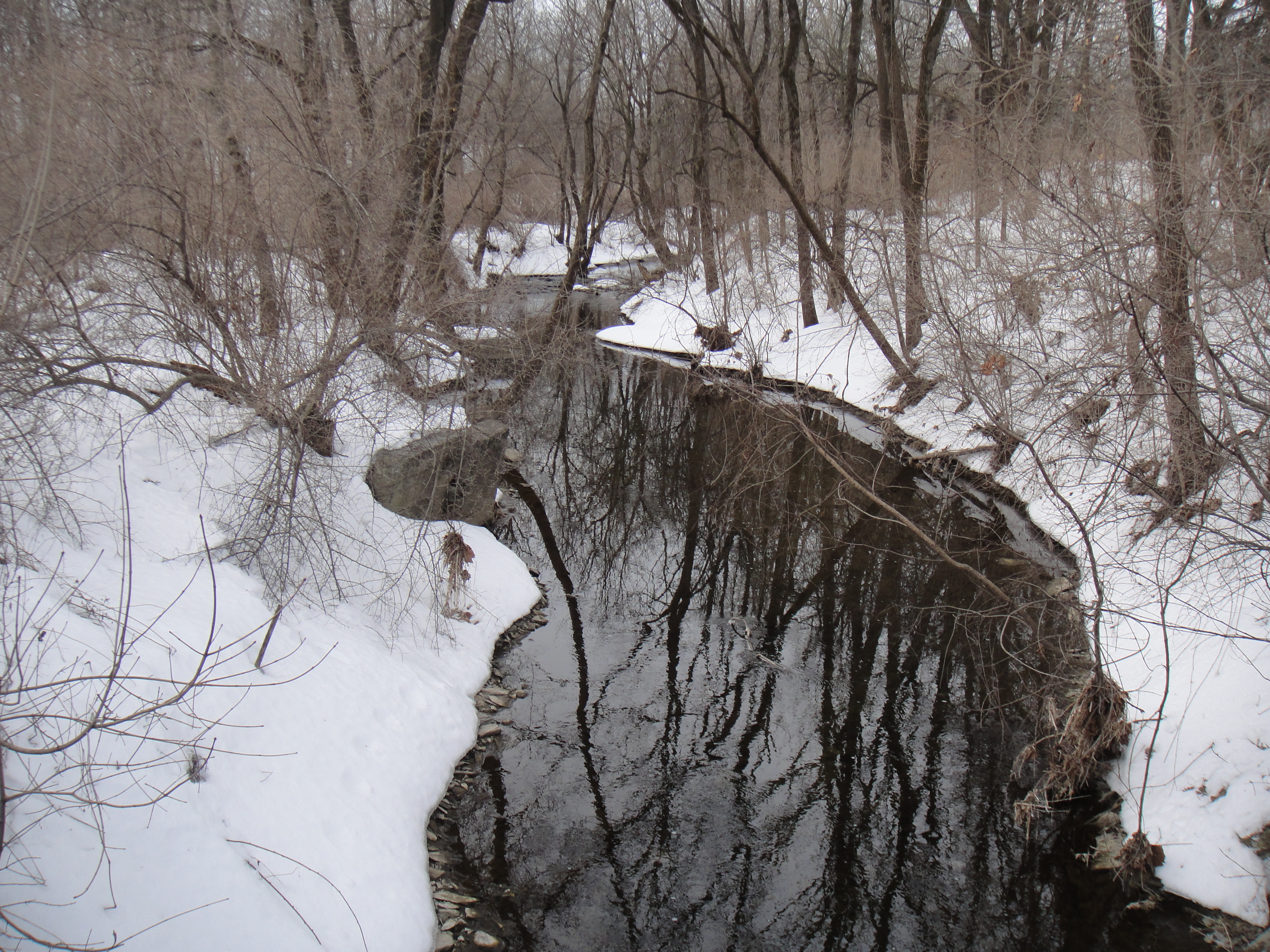
Coplay Creek, March 2014

Coplay Creek is a 14.1-mile-long (22.7 km) tributary of the Lehigh River in eastern Pennsylvania.

Coplay Creek joins the Lehigh River at Hokendauqua in Lehigh County.

== See also ==
- List of rivers of Pennsylvania
