= Whitehall-Coplay School District =

School district in Pennsylvania

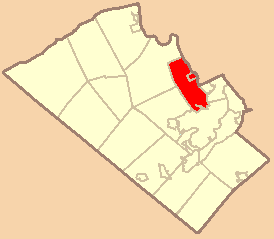

Address
- 2940 MacArthur Road Whitehall Township, Pennsylvania, 18052; United States

District information
- Type: Public
- Grades: K to 12
- Schools: Five, including Whitehall High School
- Budget: $86.162 million
- NCES District ID: 4226250

Students and staff
- Students: 4,185 (2024-25)
- Teachers: 289.96 (on an FTE basis)
- Student–teacher ratio: 14.48
- Athletic conference: Eastern Pennsylvania Conference
- District mascot: Zephyrs
- Colors: Maroon and Vegas Gold

Other information
- Website: www.whitehallcoplay.org

Whitehall-Coplay School District is a public school district in Lehigh County, Pennsylvania in the Lehigh Valley region of eastern Pennsylvania. It serves the borough of Coplay and Whitehall Township.

The school district has one high school for grades nine through 12, Whitehall High School, one middle school for grades five through eight (Whitehall-Coplay Middle School), and three elementary schools (Gockley, Steckel, and Zephyr). As of the 2024–25 school year, the school district has a total enrollment of 4,185 students between its five schools, according to National Center for Education Statistics data.

All of the district's schools are located on a single 143-acre campus, which also contains the school district's sports and administration facilities. The elementary schools are divided by grade: Clarence M. Gockley Elementary School (K-1), George D. Steckel Elementary School (2-3), Zephyr Elementary School (4-5). The school district is overseen by a nine-member board of directors, who are elected by district for staggered four-year terms. Approximately 53% of the district's students are considered economically disadvantaged and are eligible for free or reduced price lunch.

== Schools ==
- Whitehall High School
- Whitehall-Coplay Middle School
- Zephyr Elementary School
- Steckel Elementary School
- Gockley Elementary School
