= Whitehall High School (Pennsylvania) =

School in Whitehall Township, Pennsylvania, US

Location
- 3800 Mechanicsville Road; Whitehall Township, Lehigh County, Pennsylvania 18052; United States
- Coordinates: 40.6481°N 75.5041°W

Information
- Type: Public high school
- Founded: 1951
- School district: Whitehall-Coplay School District
- NCES School ID: 422625002848
- Principal: Peter J. Mayes
- Teaching staff: 91.27 (on an FTE basis)
- Grades: 9th–12th
- Enrollment: 1,462 (2024–25)
- Student to teacher ratio: 16.02
- Campus type: Suburb: Large
- Colors: Maroon and gold
- Athletics conference: Eastern Pennsylvania Conference
- Team name: Zephyrs
- Website: whs.whitehallcoplay.org

Whitehall High School is a public high school based in Whitehall Township in the Lehigh Valley region of eastern Pennsylvania. It is the only high school in the Whitehall-Coplay School District. As of the 2024–25 school year, the school had an enrollment of 1,462 students, according to National Center for Education Statistics data.

Whitehall High School is located at 3800 Mechanicsville Road in Whitehall Township. The school's mascot is the Zephyr, a train that used to travel through Whitehall Township, and the school's colors are maroon and vegas gold.

== Academics ==
In 2007, Whitehall High School earned second place in the Scholastic Scrimmage final. In 2026, Whitehall High School earned first place in the Science Olympiad EPC competition.

== Arts ==
Whitehall High School has won several Freddy Awards for their play and musical productions, including:

- In 2024, a Freddy Award for "Outstanding Performance by an Actress in a Leading Role" for its production of Mean Girls
- In 2022, "The Air Products Education/Community Impact Award" at the Freddy Awards for its production of Godspell.
- In 2017, a Freddy Award for "Outstanding Performance by an Actress in a Supporting Role" for its production of Spamalot.
- In 2016, a Freddy Award for "Outstanding Stage Crew" for its production of Guys and Dolls.
- In 2015, two awards for their production of How to Succeed in Business Without Really Trying: "Outstanding Use of Scenery" and "Outstanding Stage Crew," both of which are the second consecutive year that Whitehall has won these awards.
- In 2014, three Freddy Awards for its production of South Pacific, including "Outstanding Use of Scenery," "Outstanding Stage Crew," and "Outstanding Performance by an Actress in a Supporting Role".
- In 2011, one Freddy Award for "Outstanding Overall Production of a Musical" for the production of Li'l Abner.
- In 2007, five Freddy Awards, including "Best Overall Production," "Best Actor," "Best Solo Vocal Performance," "Best Costume Design," and "Best Small Ensemble Performance" for the production of The Scarlet Pimpernel.
- In 2006, three Freddy Awards, including "Best Actor," "Best Featured Dancer," and "Best Costume Design" for the production of Barnum.

== Athletics ==
Whitehall High School competes athletically in the Eastern Pennsylvania Conference (EPC) in the District XI division of the Pennsylvania Interscholastic Athletic Association, one of the premier high school athletic divisions in the nation.

=== Whitehall alumni in the NFL ===
Three notable Whitehall High School football players have gone on to successful careers in the National Football League:

- Saquon Barkley, current starting running back for the Philadelphia Eagles, second overall selection in the 2018 NFL draft, 2018 Offensive Rookie of the Year, 2025 Offensive Player of the Year, who won one Super Bowl with the Philadelphia Eagles.;
- Dan Koppen, former offensive center for the New England Patriots and Denver Broncos, who won two Super Bowls with the Patriots; and
- Matt Millen, former defensive linebacker with the Oakland and Los Angeles Raiders, San Francisco 49ers, and Washington Redskins, who won two Super Bowls with the Oakland Raiders, one with the San Francisco 49ers, and one with the Washington Redskins.

All three players' Whitehall jerseys (Barkley's #21, Koppen's #77, and Millen's #83) have been permanently retired by the high school in honor of their respective football accomplishments.

=== State and national championships ===
Whitehall has distinguished itself nationally and in the state of Pennsylvania with the following state and national championships:

- Boys Basketball: 1982 (Pennsylvania state champions).
- Cheerleading: 2001 (national champions).
- Wrestling: 2001 and 2002 (Christian Franco, Pennsylvania state champion at 140 lb. weight class, 2002).
- Indoor Percussion: 2003 Concert Percussion Champions; 2005, 2006, 2007 and 2008 World Class Champions.
- Marching Zephyr Band: 2006 State and All-State Champions, 2007 State Champions. The Marching Zephyr Band has recently become 2017, 2018, and 2019 American Open, and 2021 Cavalcade of Bands Independence Open Class Champions.

=== Conference championships ===
Whitehall has won many conference championships, including the following sports and years (Eastern Pennsylvania Conference since 2014, Lehigh Valley Conference 2002–2014, Mountain Valley Conference 1997–2002, East Penn Conference 1976–1997, Lehigh Valley League prior to 1976):

- Baseball: 1966, 1972, 1974, 1977, 1979, 1980, 1984, 2004, 2005 and 2008 (1984 only year to win, both, district and league titles)
- Boys Basketball: 1979, 1981, 1982, 1983, 1985, 1989, 1992, 1993, 1994, 1996, 1997, 1998, 2000, 2004 and 2005
- Boys Volleyball: 2010
- Cheerleading: 1983, 1984, 1985, 1988, 1989, 1990, 1991, 1992 and 2001
- Football: 1976, 1978, 1980, 1981 (tri-champions with Dieruff High School and Emmaus High School), 1982, 1983, 1986, 1989, 1995, 1997, 1998 and 2005
- Girls Basketball: 1982, 1984, 1985, 1986, 1988, 1989 and 2000
- Girls Softball: 1979, 1988 and 1989
- Girls Soccer: 2011

Whitehall holds the record for the most Lehigh Valley Conference championships in boys basketball.

== Notable alumni ==
- Saquon Barkley, professional football player, Philadelphia Eagles, and Super Bowl LIX champion
- Brian Knobbs (Brian Yandrisovitz), professional wrestler
- Dan Koppen, former professional football player, Denver Broncos and New England Patriots, and two-time Super Bowl champion
- Peter Lisicky, former professional basketball player, Lega Basket Serie A and EuroLeague
- Matt Millen, former professional football player, Oakland Raiders, San Francisco 49ers, and Washington Redskins, four-time Super Bowl champion, former president and general manager of Detroit Lions, broadcaster, ESPN, NFL Network, and Big Ten Network
- Noga Nir-Kistler, Paralympic swimmer and table tennis player, 2008 Summer Paralympics, and bronze medal winner in 200-meter breastroke, 2012 Summer Paralympics
- Jerry Sags (Jerome Saganowich), professional wrestler
- Dave Schneck, former professional baseball player, New York Mets
- Curt Simmons, former professional baseball player, California Angels, Chicago Cubs, Philadelphia Phillies, and St. Louis Cardinals, three-time All-Star, and 1964 World Series champion
