= Mountain Valley Conference (Pennsylvania) =

The Mountain Valley Conference (MVC) was an athletic conference consisting of six large high schools and four school districts from Monroe County and the Lehighton Area School District from Carbon County, Pennsylvania in the United States. It was part of District XI of the Pennsylvania Interscholastic Athletic Association (PIAA). In 2014, its teams were mostly assimilated into the 18-team league of large eastern and northeastern Pennsylvania high schools known as the Eastern Pennsylvania Conference.

== History ==
There had been widespread discussion about high school league realignment in the Lehigh Valley starting in late 1990 and early 1991. In the fall of 1993, the Mountain Valley Conference was formed. The new league included all the public high schools in Monroe County at the time: Stroudsburg, East Stroudsburg, Pocono Mountain, and Pleasant Valley High Schools, plus Nazareth and Northampton High Schools from Northampton County. Lehighton High School also later joined the new league, giving it an initial membership of seven schools when competition began in the 1994–95 school year.

After the 1997–98 school year, the MVC added more schools in Lehigh and Northampton Counties: Easton, Freedom, Liberty, Parkland, and Whitehall all joined the league. After 2001–02, the seven schools in Lehigh and Northampton Counties left the league to help form the Lehigh Valley Conference. East Stroudsburg Area School District opened a new high school near the turn of the century, and Pocono Mountain School District opened a new high school in 2002; both new schools were added to the MVC for the start of the 2002–03 school year. MVC membership has been stable from 2002 to 2012.

In 2012, Allentown's two large public schools, Dieruff High School and William Allen High School, joined the MVC as associate members for football only for a four-year term. All schools voted to allow both Allentown teams into the conference with only Lehighton voting against it.

In the 2014–2015 season, six Monroe County schools became part of the Lehigh Valley Conference, expanding that conference to a large 18-team super conference, which was subsequently renamed the Eastern Pennsylvania Conference. Lehighton left the Mountain Valley Conference in most sports and now participate in the Schuylkill League. They play football in the Anthracite Football League and act as an independent team in field hockey.

== High schools ==
The seven high school teams that previously comprised the Mountain Valley Conference (and their locations) were:

- East Stroudsburg South Cavaliers (East Stroudsburg).
- East Stroudsburg North Timberwolves (Bushkill)
- Pocono Mountain East Cardinals (Swiftwater)
- Pocono Mountain West Panthers (Pocono Summit)
- Stroudsburg Mountaineers (Stroudsburg)
- Pleasant Valley Bears (Brodheadsville)
- Lehighton Indians (Lehighton)

Football only:

- Allen Canaries (Allentown)
- Dieruff Huskies (Allentown)

== District ==
The Mountain Valley Conference was part of District XI of the PIAA.

== Mountain Valley Conference ==
=== National Football League (NFL) ===
- Kyshoen Jarrett, former strong safety, Washington Redskins (East Stroudsburg South High School)
- James Mungro, former running back, Indianapolis Colts and Super Bowl XLI champion (East Stroudsburg South High School)
- Chris Neild, former nose tackle, Houston Texans and Washington Redskins (Stroudsburg High School)

=== Arena Football League (AFL) ===
- Kevin Nagle, former fullback and linebacker, Colorado Crush and Orlando Predators (Pleasant Valley High School)

== See also ==
- Colonial League
- Eastern Pennsylvania Conference
- Lehigh Valley Conference
- PIAA District 11
