= Lehigh Valley Conference =

High school athletic conference in Pennsylvania (2001–2014)

The Lehigh Valley Interscholastic Athletic Conference, known informally as the Lehigh Valley Conference or LVC, was an athletic conference consisting of 12 of the largest high schools from Lehigh and Northampton counties in the Lehigh Valley region of Pennsylvania. It was part of District XI of the Pennsylvania Interscholastic Athletic Association (PIAA). In 2014, its teams were mostly assimilated into the Eastern Pennsylvania Conference, an even larger 18-team league of the largest high schools in the Lehigh Valley and Pocono Mountains regions of eastern and northeastern Pennsylvania.

== History ==
Founded on November 14, 2001, the newly formed Lehigh Valley Conference (LVC) rejoined most of the 12 schools that formerly competed in the Eastern Pennsylvania Conference at various times from 1976 to 1997, before five schools left in 1997 to join the Mountain Valley Conference (MVC). The LVC got off the ground after Parkland athletic director and head football coach Richard T. Sniscak was appointed principal of Parkland High School in May 2001 before earning a principal certification or a master's degree. In October 2001, Sniscak was approached by Parkland School Board member and Emmaus High School principal Dr. Herman Corradetti with the idea of reuniting the area schools that had competed in the East Penn Conference with a new conference, and played an intricate role in its formation.

In 1994, Phillipsburg High School left the East Penn Conference to join the Skyland Conference in New Jersey, which made was necessary for it to compete in NJISAA football playoffs. The same year, Northampton Area High School joined the MVC. Eleven of these schools then reunited, along with Nazareth Area High School, to form the LVC, which previously competed in the Colonial League before moving to the MVC in 1994. In 2002, Bethlehem Catholic High School was granted admission to the conference. In the 2002-03 school year, LVC conference play began.

In 2012, Allentown's two large public high schools, Allen High School and Dieruff High School, decided to join the MVC as associate members for football only. Then, on October 2, 2013, the LVC voted to invite six Monroe County high schools: Stroudsburg High School in Stroudsburg, East Stroudsburg High School North in Dingmans Ferry, East Stroudsburg High School South in East Stroudsburg, Pocono Mountain East High School in Swiftwater, Pocono Mountain West High School in Pocono Summit, and Pleasant Valley Area High School in Brodheadsville. The remaining MVC school, Lehighton Area High School, had already announced in 2012 they would join the Schuylkill League.

== High schools ==
The 12 high school teams in the Lehigh Valley Conference (and their locations) were:

- Allen High School Canaries (Allentown)
- Allentown Central Catholic High School Vikings (Allentown)
- Bethlehem Catholic High School Golden Hawks (Bethlehem)
- Dieruff High School Huskies (Allentown)
- Easton Area High School Red Rovers (Easton)
- Emmaus High School Green Hornets (Emmaus)
- Freedom High School Patriots (Bethlehem Township)
- Liberty High School Hurricanes (Bethlehem)
- Nazareth Area High School Blue Eagles (Nazareth)
- Northampton Area High School Konkrete Kids (Northampton)
- Parkland High School Trojans (South Whitehall Township)
- Whitehall High School Zephyrs (Whitehall Township)

Former member of the East Penn Conference (predecessor to the Lehigh Valley Conference):

- Phillipsburg High School Stateliners (Phillipsburg, New Jersey)

Dieruff High School and William Allen High School competed in all sports except football where, beginning in 2012, in the smaller Mountain Valley Conference.

In 2013, the Lehigh Valley Conference invited the six Monroe County members of the Mountain Valley Conference to join the LVC. The schools accepted the invitation and formed an 18-school conference, called the Eastern Pennsylvania Conference, that began play in the 2014–15 school year.

=== Records ===
Among Lehigh Valley Conference schools, Emmaus High School holds the record for most Pennsylvania state championships in all sports since the league's creation. Parkland High School holds the record for the most conference championships in all sports.

== Television coverage ==
Lehigh Valley Conference football, boys and girls basketball games and wrestling matches were broadcast on Service Electric's Channel 2, a Lehigh Valley-based cable station, during their respective seasons. RCN 4, another local television station, also broadcast the Lehigh Valley Conference's football, basketball and wrestling games and matches.

Service Electric also broadcast "Plays of the Week", a weekly segment sponsored by Yocco's Hot Dogs, featuring the best football, basketball, wrestling, and other Lehigh Valley Conference sports highlights of the week.

== Sports ==
=== Lehigh Valley Conference football ===
Lehigh Valley Conference football teams routinely ranked highly in the state and nationally in USA Today's annual ranking of the nation's top high school sports teams. In 2008, Liberty High School won the AAAA-level Pennsylvania state football championship, was ranked second in the Eastern United States and 20th among all high schools nationally. In 2002, Parkland High School won the AAAA-level Pennsylvania state football championship, was ranked fifth in the East, and 11th among all high schools nationally. In 2007, Parkland High School also appeared in the AAAA-level Pennsylvania state football championship finals, where they lost to Pittsburgh Central Catholic. In 2008, Liberty High School won the AAAA-level state football championship, defeating Bethel Park High School. Liberty also appeared in the AAAA state finals in 2005 and 2006, but lost. In 2010, Allentown Central Catholic High School won the AAA-level Pennsylvania state football championship, and was ranked fifth on the East Coast. They were also ranked in the top 50 nationally, according to maxpreps.com.

High schools currently in the LVC were dominant in local football prior to the conference's formation. Bethlehem Catholic High School won state championships in 1988 (at the AA level) and 1990 (at the AAA level). Allentown Central Catholic High School won the AAA-class state title in 1993, 1998, and 2010. In 1993, Allentown Central Catholic was ranked tenth among all high schools nationally.

The conference has produced high school graduates who have played at the collegiate and NFL levels.

To date, 18 alumni of Lehigh Valley Conference schools have gone on to play professionally in the NFL. Among them, Chuck Bednarik of Bethlehem High School (now Liberty High School) was named to the Pro Football Hall of Fame, the highest honor afforded an NFL player, following his 1961 retirement from the Philadelphia Eagles. Bednarik's tackle of Frank Gifford, then a running back with the New York Giants, on November 20, 1960, is widely known as The Hit and is routinely ranked as one of the hardest hits and best plays in NFL history.

=== Girls field hockey ===
The Lehigh Valley Conference was recognized nationally as one of the premier leagues in the nation for girls field hockey. In 2010, the national sports web site, topofthecircle.com, ranked Emmaus High School as the best girls field hockey team in the nation for the third time in the program's history. Since its inception, close to 200 members of the Emmaus High School girls field hockey team have gone on to compete on the collegiate level. Emmaus High School has won the Pennsylvania state championship in girls field hockey 10 times and won the District XI title in 22 consecutive seasons, as of 2010.

=== Wrestling ===
The Lehigh Valley Conference is also recognized nationally. Easton Area High School, Nazareth Area High School, Northampton Area High School. LVC schools have won numerous PIAA state individual wrestling championships and six team championships, including three straight 2A team titles for Bethlehem Catholic High School between 2010 and 2013.

A sign of its national stature, at one time in the early 2000s, the National High School Coaches Association simultaneously ranked Easton Area High School, Nazareth Area High School, and Northampton Area High School in their "National Top 25" rankings of the nation's best high school wrestling teams. Individual wrestlers from Lehigh Valley Conference schools are often a fixture in national rankings, and collegiate wrestling scouts from around the nation recruit heavily among Lehigh Valley Conference wrestling teams. Division I collegiate wrestling is filled with wrestlers from the Lehigh Valley Conference, and the U.S. Olympic wrestling team also has often included wrestlers from the conference. Many Lehigh Valley Conference alumni have gone on to compete in college wrestling. One alumnus, Bobby Weaver from Easton High School, went on to win the gold medal in wrestling at the 1984 Summer Olympics.

Lehigh Valley Conference high school wrestling was televised locally on Service Electric, WLVT-TV and other radio and television stations.

== Lehigh Valley Conference professional and Olympic athletes ==
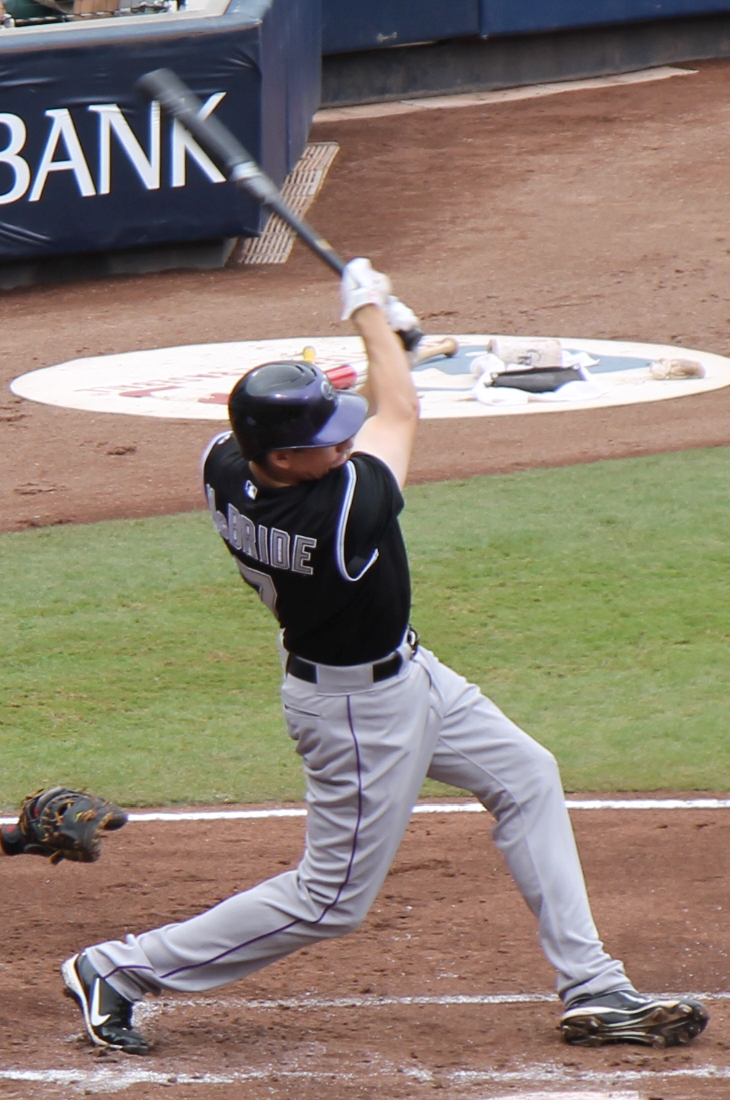
Matt McBride, Liberty High School

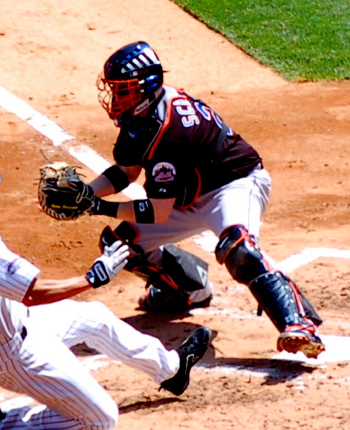
Brian Schneider, Northampton Area High School

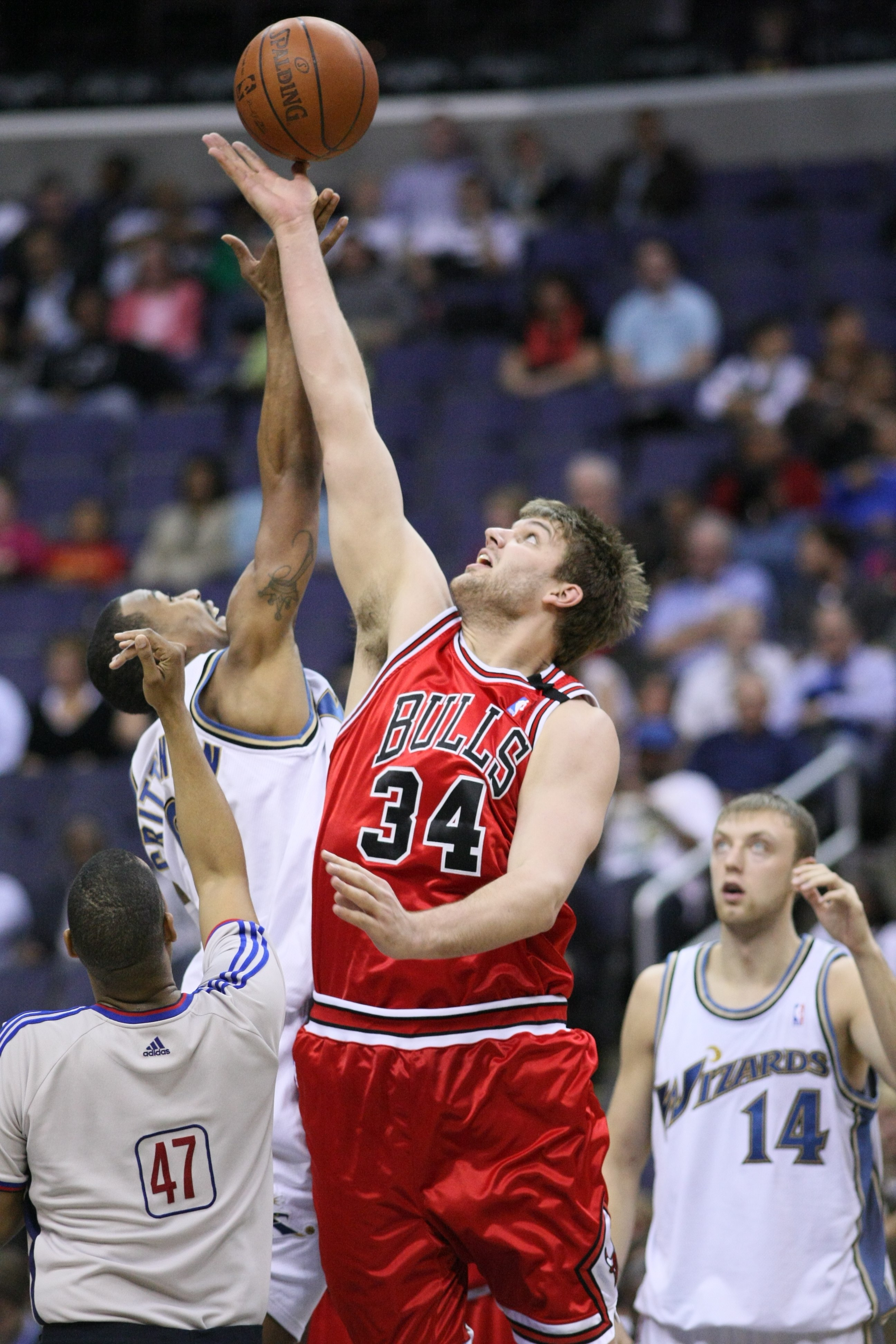
Aaron Gray, Emmaus High School

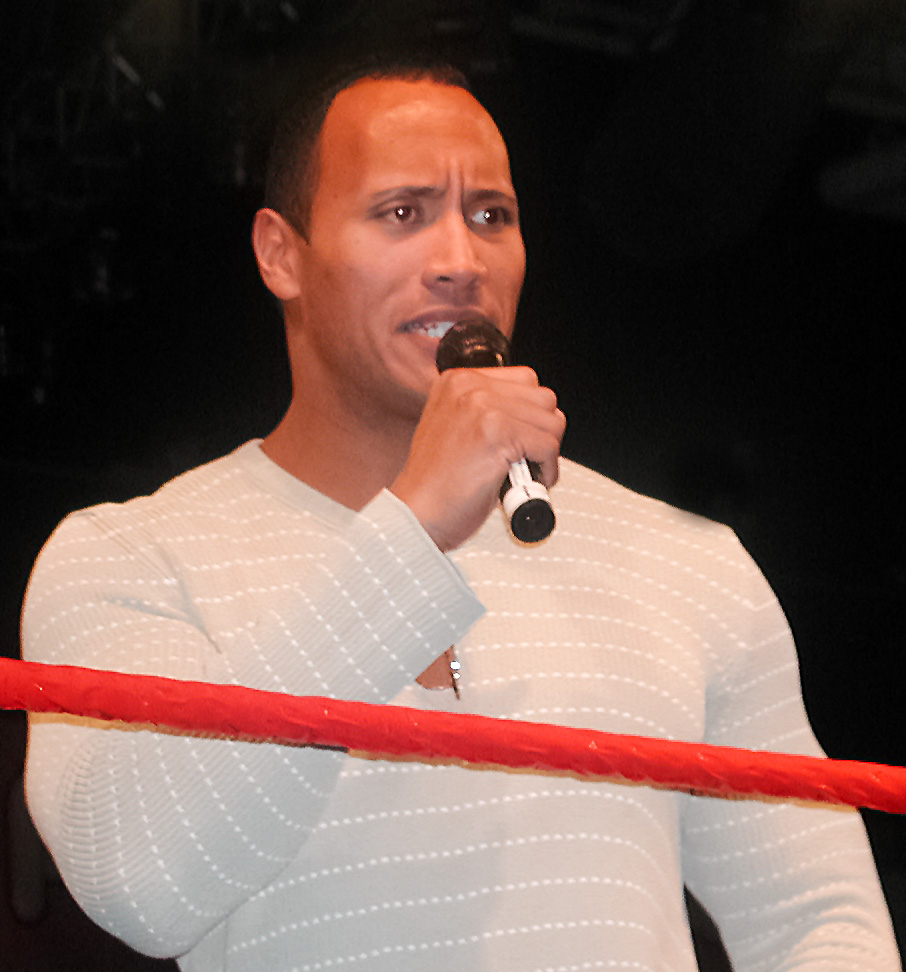
Dwayne "The Rock" Johnson, Freedom High School

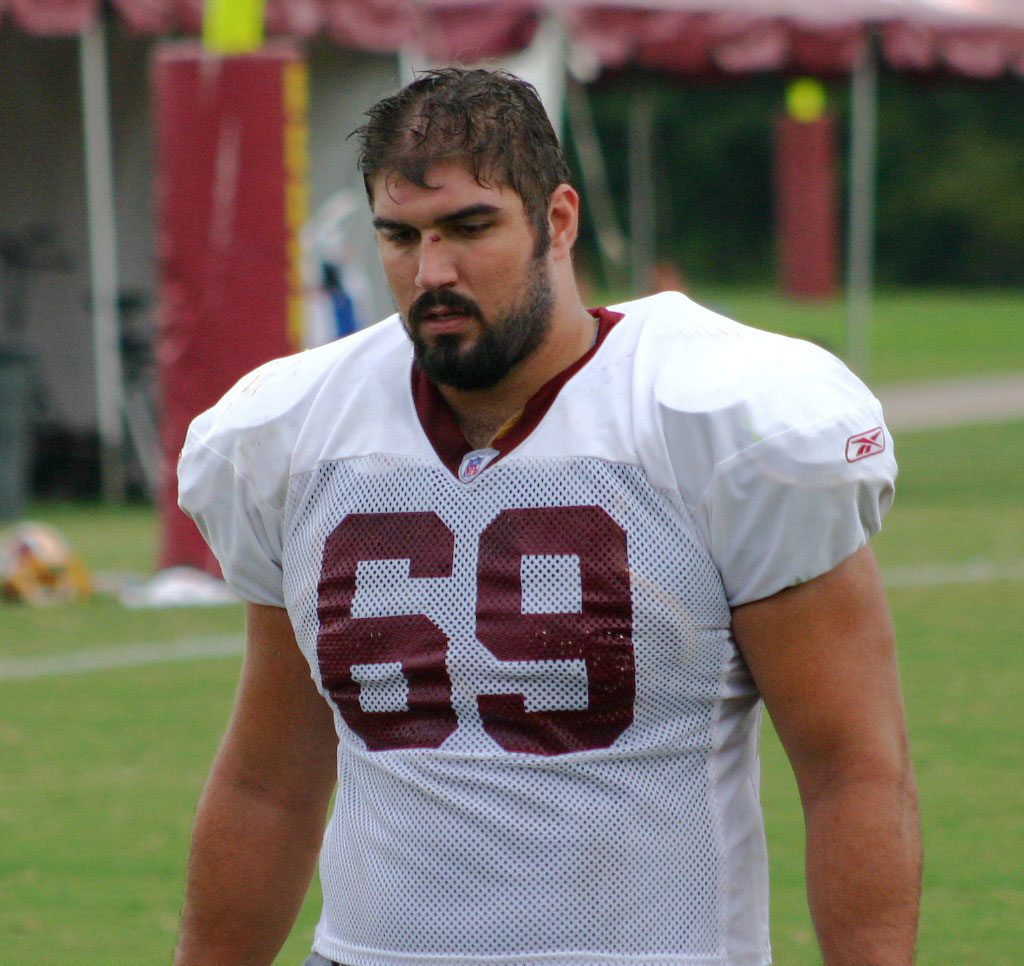
Jim Molinaro, Bethlehem Catholic High School

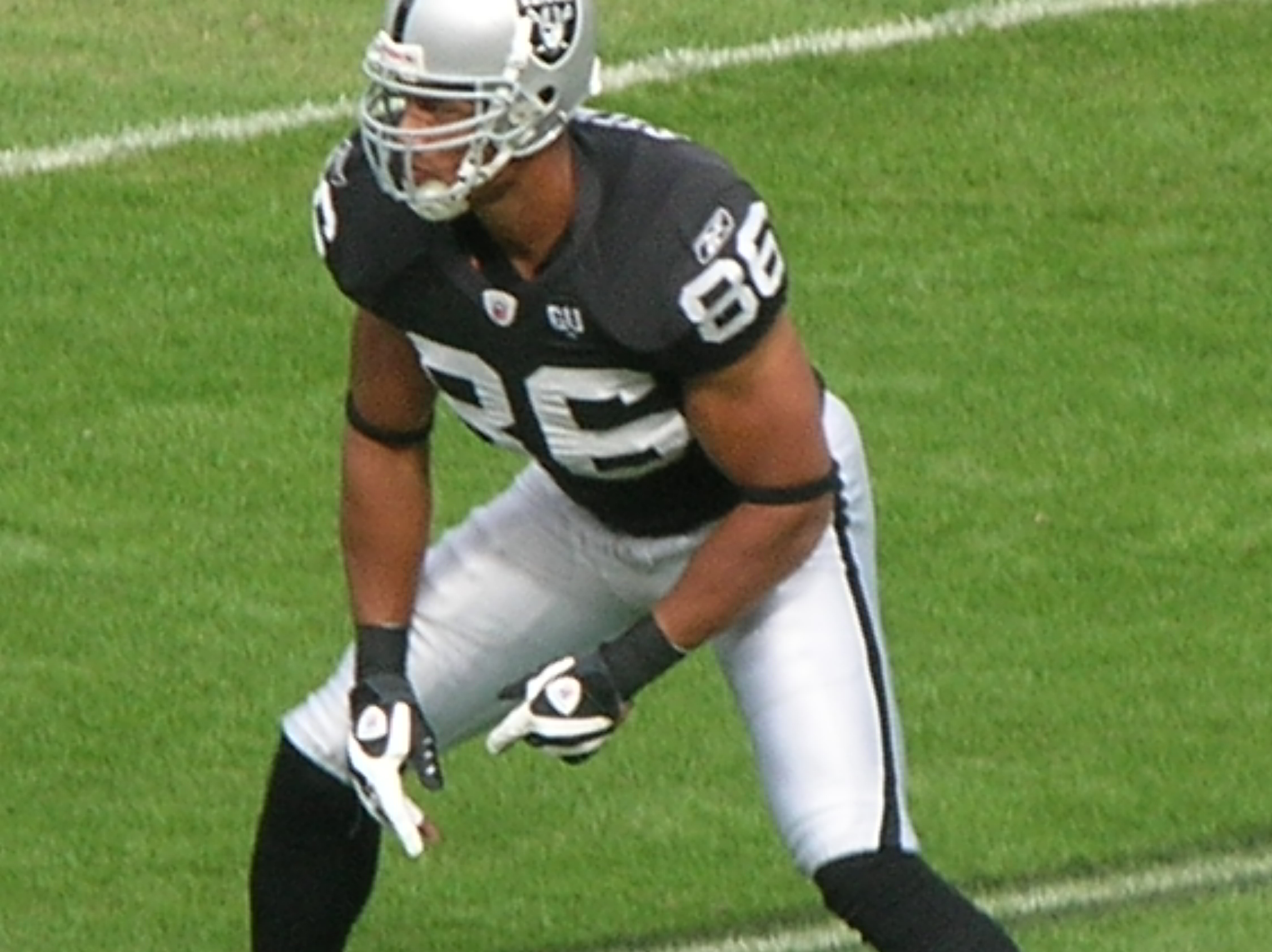
Tony Stewart, Allentown Central Catholic High School

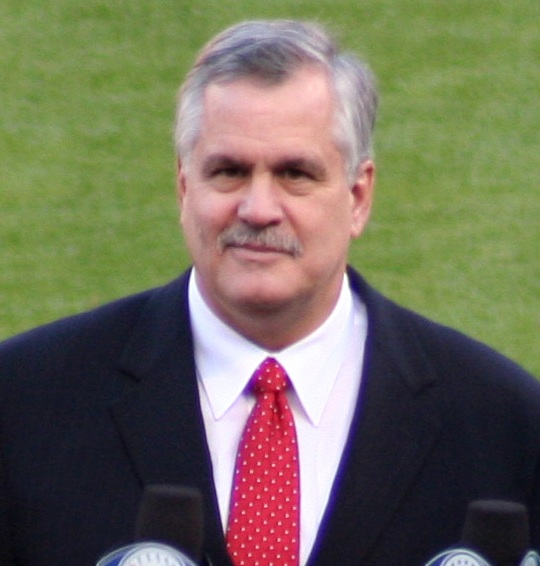
Matt Millen, Whitehall High School

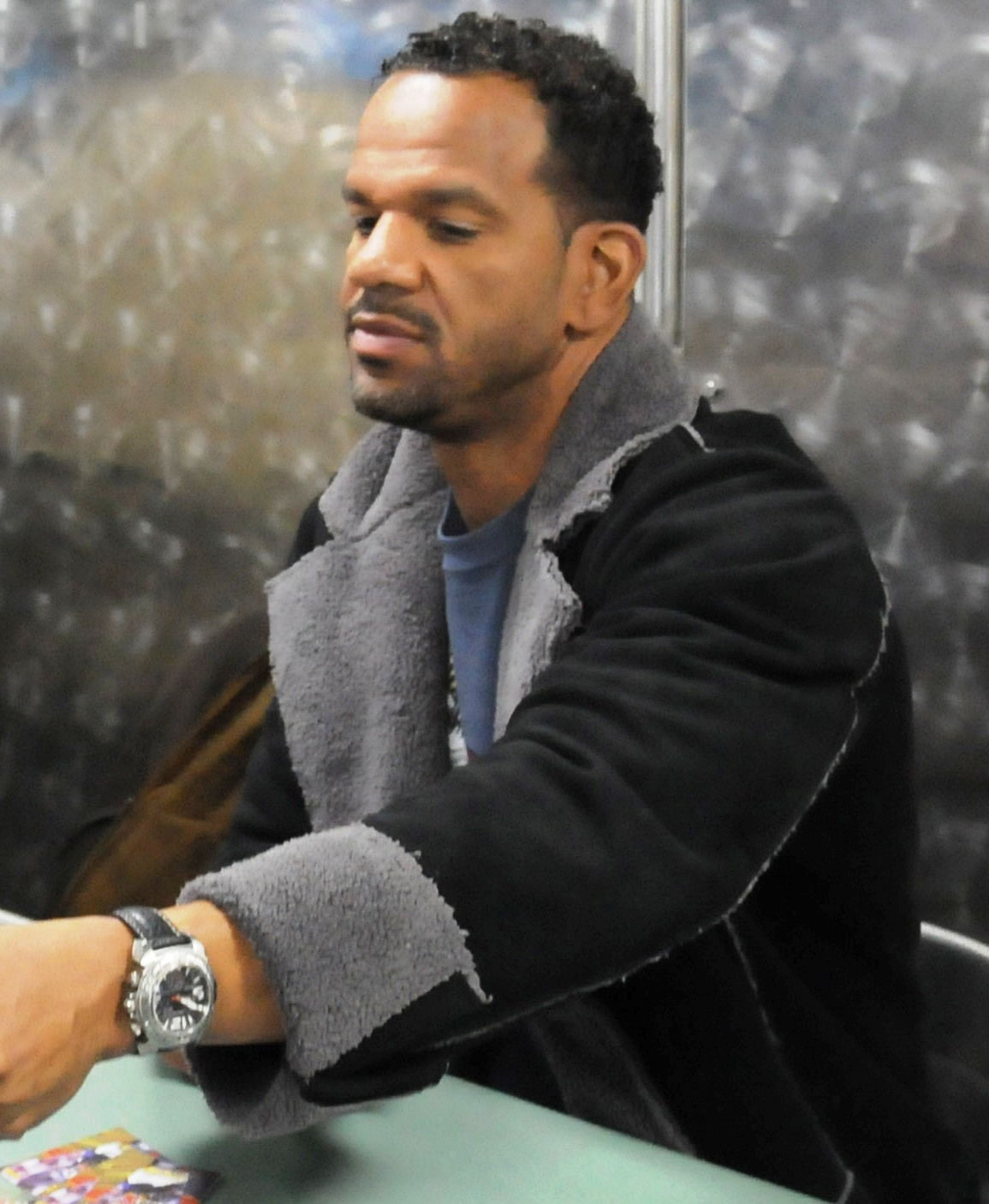
Andre Reed, Dieruff High School

Current and former professional and Olympic athletes who played high school athletics at the schools currently comprising the Lehigh Valley Conference include:

=== Major League Baseball (MLB) ===
==== Former MLB players ====
- Charlie Berry, former catcher, Boston Red Sox, Chicago White Sox, and Philadelphia Athletics (Phillipsburg High School, Phillipsburg, New Jersey)
- Pat Kelly, former second baseman, New York Yankees, St. Louis Cardinals, and Toronto Blue Jays (Catasauqua High School, Catasauqua)
- Gary Lavelle, former pitcher, Oakland Athletics, San Francisco Giants, and Toronto Blue Jays (Liberty High School, Bethlehem)
- Matt McBride, former infielder, Colorado Rockies and Oakland Athletics (Liberty High School, Bethlehem)
- Brian Schneider, former catcher, Montreal Expos/Washington Nationals, New York Mets, and Philadelphia Phillies (Northampton Area High School, Northampton)
- Curt Simmons, former pitcher, Chicago Cubs, Los Angeles Angels, Philadelphia Phillies, and St. Louis Cardinals (Whitehall High School, Whitehall Township)

=== National Basketball Association (NBA) ===
==== Former NBA players ====
- Aaron Gray, former center, Chicago Bulls, Detroit Pistons, New Orleans Hornets, and Sacramento Kings
- Brant Weidner, former forward, San Antonio Spurs (Parkland High School, Allentown)

=== National Football League (NFL) ===
==== Current and former NFL players ====
- Saquon Barkley, running back, Philadelphia Eagles (Whitehall High School, Whitehall Township)
- Chuck Bednarik, former center and linebacker, Philadelphia Eagles, member of the Pro Football Hall of Fame (Liberty High School, Bethlehem)
- Keith Dorney, former offensive tackle, Detroit Lions (Emmaus High School, Emmaus)
- Jim Druckenmiller, former quarterback, Miami Dolphins and San Francisco 49ers (Northampton Area High School, Northampton)
- Mike Guman, former running back, Los Angeles Rams (Bethlehem Catholic High School, Bethlehem)
- Mike Hartenstine, former defensive end, Chicago Bears and Minnesota Vikings (Liberty High School, Bethlehem)
- Dan Koppen, former center, Denver Broncos and New England Patriots (Whitehall High School, Whitehall Township)
- Jonathan Linton, former running back, Buffalo Bills (Catasauqua High School, Catasauqua)
- Tim Massaquoi, former tight end, Miami Dolphins (Parkland High School, South Whitehall Township)
- Ed McCaffrey, former wide receiver, Denver Broncos, New York Giants, and San Francisco 49ers (Allentown Central Catholic High School, Allentown)
- Joe Milinichik, former offensive guard, Detroit Lions, Los Angeles Rams, and San Diego Chargers (Emmaus High School, Emmaus)
- Matt Millen, former linebacker, Oakland Raiders, San Francisco 49ers, and Washington Redskins (Whitehall High School, Whitehall Township)
- Jim Molinaro, former offensive tackle, Dallas Cowboys and Washington Redskins (Bethlehem Catholic High School, Bethlehem)
- Bob Parsons, former kicker and tight end, Chicago Bears (Pen Argyl Area High School)
- Andre Reed, former wide receiver, Buffalo Bills and Washington Redskins (Dieruff High School, Allentown)
- Mike Reichenbach, former linebacker, Philadelphia Eagles and Miami Dolphins (Liberty High School, Bethlehem)
- Jim Ringo, former center, Green Bay Packers and Philadelphia Eagles, member of the Pro Football Hall of Fame (Phillipsburg High School, Phillipsburg, New Jersey)
- Larry Seiple, former punter, Miami Dolphins (William Allen High School, Allentown)
- John Spagnola, former tight end, Green Bay Packers, Philadelphia Eagles, and Seattle Seahawks (Bethlehem Catholic High School, Bethlehem)
- Tony Stewart, former tight end, Cincinnati Bengals, Oakland Raiders, and Philadelphia Eagles (Allentown Central Catholic High School, Allentown)
- Devin Street, former wide receiver, Dallas Cowboys, Houston Texans, Indianapolis Colts, New England Patriots, and New York Jets (Liberty High School, Bethlehem)
- Kevin White, former wide receiver, Chicago Bears, New Orleans Saints, and San Francisco 49ers (Emmaus High School, Emmaus)
- Kyzir White, linebacker, San Francisco 49ers (Emmaus High School, Emmaus)
- Andre Williams, former running back, Los Angeles Chargers and New York Giants (Parkland High School, South Whitehall Township)
- Joe Wolf, former offensive tackle, Arizona Cardinals (William Allen High School, Allentown)
- Kenny Yeboah, tight end, New York Jets (Parkland High School, Allentown)

=== Olympics ===
==== Olympic cycling ====
- Marty Nothstein, 2000 Summer Olympics gold medal winner, track cycling (Emmaus High School, Emmaus)

==== Olympic field hockey ====
- Cindy Werley, 1996 Summer Olympics women's field hockey player (Emmaus High School, Emmaus)

==== Olympic wrestling ====
- Bobby Weaver, 1984 Summer Olympics gold medal winner, wrestling (Easton Area High School, Easton)

=== Professional auto racing ===
- Michael Andretti, former IndyCar Series driver (Nazareth Area High School, Nazareth)

=== Professional cycling ===
- Marty Nothstein, former professional cyclist (Emmaus High School, Emmaus)
- Nicole Reinhart, former professional cyclist (Emmaus High School, Emmaus)

=== Professional soccer ===
- Gina Lewandowski, midfielder and defender, NJ/NY Gotham FC (Allentown Central Catholic High School, Allentown)

=== Women's National Basketball Association (WNBA) ===
==== Former WNBA players ====
- Michelle M. Marciniak, former point guard, WNBA's Portland Fire and Seattle Storm (Allentown Central Catholic High School, Allentown)

=== World Wrestling Entertainment (WWE) ===
- Afa Anoa'i, Jr., professional wrestler (Freedom High School, Bethlehem)
- Dwayne "The Rock" Johnson, former professional wrestler (Freedom High School, Bethlehem)
- Billy Kidman, professional wrestler (Parkland High School, Allentown)
- Brian Knobs, former professional wrestler (Whitehall High School, Whitehall Township)
- Jerry Sags, former professional wrestler (Whitehall High School, Whitehall Township)

== Lehigh Valley Conference professional and collegiate coaches ==
Lehigh Valley Conference athletes who have gone on to athletic coaching and team management careers include:

=== College basketball coaches ===
- Michelle M. Marciniak, former assistant coach, South Carolina women's basketball (Allentown Central Catholic High School, Allentown)

=== College football coaches ===
- Chuck Amato, former head football coach, North Carolina State (Easton Area High School, Easton)
- Tim Brewster, former head football coach, Minnesota (Phillipsburg High School, Phillipsburg, New Jersey)
- K. C. Keeler, head football coach, Temple (Emmaus High School, Emmaus)

=== National Basketball Association (NBA) coaches ===
- Pete Carril, former assistant coach, Sacramento Kings (Liberty High School, Bethlehem)

=== National Football League (NFL) coaches and management ===
- Matt Millen, former president and general manager, Detroit Lions (Whitehall High School, Whitehall Township)
- Jim Ringo, former head coach and offensive coordinator, Buffalo Bills (Phillipsburg High School, Phillipsburg, New Jersey)

== See also ==
- Colonial League
- Eastern Pennsylvania Conference
- Mountain Valley Conference
- PIAA District 11
