= Ken Parrish =

American football player (born 1984)

No. 3, 8, 13
- Position: Kicker

Personal information
- Born: June 22, 1984 (age 42); East Stroudsburg, Pennsylvania, U.S.
- Listed height: 6 ft 1 in (1.85 m)
- Listed weight: 210 lb (95 kg)

Career information
- High school: East Stroudsburg (PA) South
- College: East Stroudsburg
- NFL draft: 2007: undrafted

Career history
- San Francisco 49ers (2007)*; Philadelphia Eagles (2009)*; New York Jets (2009)*; Philadelphia Eagles (2010)*; Florida Tuskers (2010); Atlanta Falcons (2011)*; Jacksonville Jaguars (2013)*; Lehigh Valley Steelhawks (2016)*
- * Offseason or practice squad member only

Awards and highlights
- 2× First-team All-PSAC 2005–2006
- Stats at Pro Football Reference

Ken Parrish (born June 22, 1984) is an American former football punter. He was signed by the San Francisco 49ers as an undrafted free agent in 2007. He played college football at East Stroudsburg.

Parrish was also a member of the Philadelphia Eagles, New York Jets, Florida Tuskers, Atlanta Falcons, Jacksonville Jaguars, and Lehigh Valley Steelhawks.

== Early life and education ==
Parrish attended East Stroudsburg High School South in East Stroudsburg, Pennsylvania, where he played soccer for three years before joining the football team as a punter during his senior year. There, he earned All-Mountain Valley Conference and Pocono Record All-Area honors. He decided to join the football team after the schools' previous punter, Joseph Gaeta, who later played football at Temple University, became injured. Gaeta is credited with helping to convince Parrish to make the switch from soccer to football. He only had to punt three balls for the school's football coach before he was given the punting job for the rest of the season.

=== College career ===
After high school, Parrish attended East Stroudsburg University of Pennsylvania, where he averaged 40.3 yards per punt and landed 59 of his 174 punts inside the 20-yard line during his college career. In his junior and senior year, he earned All-Pennsylvania State Athletic Conference eastern division honors after averaging 42.5 yards per punt, with 30 of his 75 punts landing inside the 20 and just four touchbacks during that span. As a senior, he punted 42 times in 14 games to help ESU win the Division II Northeast Regional championship and advanced to the national semifinals for the first time in school history. As a senior, he averaged 42.0 yards per punt. As a junior, he averaged 43.2 yards per punt. As a sophomore, he averaged 40.7 yards per punt. As a freshman, he averaged 36.7 yards per punt. Parrish graduated East Stroudsburg with a degree in criminal justice.

== Professional career ==
=== San Francisco 49ers ===
Parrish was undrafted in the 2007 NFL draft, and was signed by the San Francisco 49ers on May 3, 2007. He spent that training camp and pre-season with the 49ers before being released prior to the start of the regular season.

=== First stint with Eagles ===
Parrish signed with the Philadelphia Eagles as a free agent on May 28, 2009. He was waived on August 8 after the team signed tight end Rob Myers.

=== New York Jets ===
Parrish signed with the New York Jets as a free agent on August 16, 2009, after the team waived punter T. J. Conley. Parrish was waived on August 28 when the team claimed punter Glenn Pakulak off waivers.

=== Second stint with Eagles ===
Parrish was re-signed to a three-year contract by the Philadelphia Eagles on April 28, 2010. He was waived on August 15.

=== Florida Tuskers ===
Parrish was signed by the Florida Tuskers of the United Football League on September 9, 2010.

=== Atlanta Falcons ===
Parrish was signed by the Atlanta Falcons on March 3, 2011, but was released on August 24.

=== Jacksonville Jaguars ===
Parrish was signed by the Jacksonville Jaguars on June 13, 2013, and later released on August 25.

=== Lehigh Valley Steelhawks ===
In 2016, Parrish tried out and made the Lehigh Valley Steelhawks of American Indoor Football.

== Personal life ==
After being released by the 49ers in 2007, Parrish spent eight months as a police officer with the Stroud Area Regional Police in his hometown, East Stroudsburg, Pennsylvania. After the eight months, he decided that he would pursue a comeback into the NFL by leaving the police force. When asked about his decision to leave the police force, Parrish said, "It was a decision that took weeks and weeks and weeks and lots of discussions with my family. I always had great backing from my family. They [said], 'Ken, if you feel this is something you need to go out and conquer, then go ahead and do it.'"

Parrish moved to Modesto, California, to perfect his punting, kickoffs, placekicks, and holding for placekicks in order to get ready for his comeback into the NFL.

After he was released by the Jets following training camp, Parrish worked as a substitute teacher at J. T. Lambert Intermediate School and as a police officer again with the Stroud Area Regional Police.

Parrish spent time during the 2010 offseason in Las Vegas Valley, Nevada, to work with Louie Aguiar on his punting and kicking.

Parrish resides in Pennsylvania, with his wife Amanda and their two daughters, Reese and Charlotte.
