= Lehigh Valley Christian High School =

Location
- 1500 Linden Street - Rear; Bethlehem, Pennsylvania 18017; United States
- 40.6226°N 75.4343°W

Information
- Type: Private, Christian
- Established: 1988
- Closed: June 2020
- Colors: Red, black, and white
- Mascot: Cougar

Lehigh Valley Christian High School (LVCHS) was a private, Christian high school located in Bethlehem, Pennsylvania, United States. It closed at the end of the 2019-20 school year. Some of its teachers formed the new Fellowship Christian High School in Bethlehem.

== History ==
LVCHS was established in 1988 as a cooperative among three Lehigh Valley Christian elementary schools, Bethlehem Christian School, Lehigh Christian Academy, and Phillipsburg Christian Academy. The three schools sought to continue their Christian education style from the ninth to the twelfth grades. Bethlehem Christian School and Covenant Christian Academy are the two schools who last cooperated with Lehigh Valley Christian High School. After being located in Calvary Temple Church in Allentown, LVCHS moved in September 2018 to its final location at 1500 Linden Street, in Bethlehem, Pennsylvania.

== Student body ==
While located in Bethlehem, LVCHS students come from many many municipalities in the Lehigh Valley region of Pennsylvania, western New Jersey, and a wide range of countries from around the world.

== Accreditation and memberships ==
Lehigh Valley Christian High School has earned accreditation from both the Middle States Association of Colleges and Schools and the Association of Christian Schools International, the latter of which the school is also a member. LVCHS is also a member of the Mid-Atlantic Christian School Association.

== Athletics ==
LVCHS competes in District XI of the Pennsylvania Interscholastic Athletic Association. The Cougars field teams in boys and girls soccer, girls volleyball, boys and girls basketball, cheerleading, baseball, and track and field.
