= Mountain Valley Conference =

Mountain Valley Conference may refer to:

- Mountain Valley Conference (Maine), an athletic conference for small high schools including Mountain Valley High School
- Mountain Valley Conference (New Jersey), a former high school sports association under the jurisdiction of the New Jersey State Interscholastic Athletic Association
- Mountain Valley Conference (Pennsylvania), a former athletic conference of high schools and school districts
- Mountain Valley Conference (NJCAA), a New York-based collegiate conference in the National Junior College Athletic Association
