= Bill Hoffman (American football) =

American football player (1902–1994)

No. 17
- Position: Guard

Personal information
- Born: August 6, 1901; Raubsville, Pennsylvania, U.S.
- Died: June 6, 1994 (aged 93); Allentown, Pennsylvania, U.S.
- Listed height: 5 ft 10 in (1.78 m)
- Listed weight: 227 lb (103 kg)

Career information
- High school: Easton (Easton, Pennsylvania)
- College: Lehigh

Career history
- Frankford Yellow Jackets (1924–1926); Pottsville Maroons (1927)

Awards and highlights
- NFL champion (1926)
- Stats at Pro Football Reference

Jacob William Hoffman (August 6, 1901 – June 6, 1994) was an American professional football guard who played three seasons with the Frankford Yellow Jackets of the National Football League (NFL). He played college football at Lehigh University. He was also a member of the Pottsville Maroons.

== Early life ==
Jacob William Hoffman was born on August 6, 1901, in Raubsville, Pennsylvania. He attended Easton Area High School in Easton, Pennsylvania.

== College career ==
Hoffman played college football for the Lehigh Mountain Hawks of Lehigh University. New York writers named him to the All-Lehigh team in 1924.

== Professional career ==
Hoffman signed with the Frankford Yellow Jackets of the NFL in 1924. He played in one game for the Yellow Jackets during the 1924 season. He played in 19 games, starting 17, for Frankford in 1925. Hoffman started 16 games in 1926, helping them win the NFL championship by finishing in first place in the league with a 14–1–2.

Hoffman was a member of the NFL's Pottsville Maroons during the 1927 season.

== Personal life ==
Hoffman died on June 6, 1994, in Allentown, Pennsylvania.
