= Kyshoen Jarrett =

American football player and coach (born 1993)

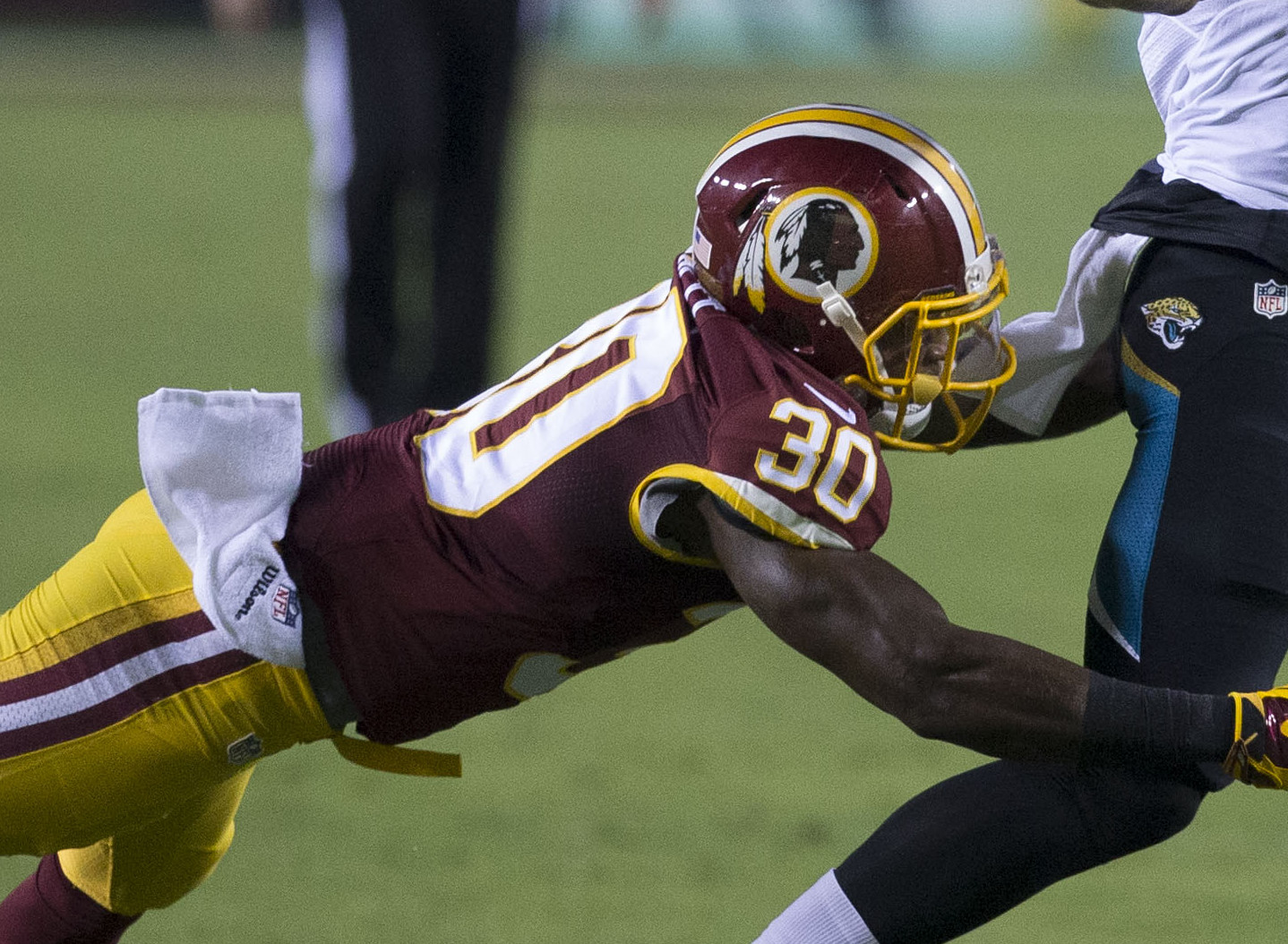
- Jarrett with the Washington Redskins in 2015

Howard Bison
- Title: Defensive coordinator & safeties coach

Personal information
- Born: May 4, 1993 (age 33); East Stroudsburg, Pennsylvania, U.S.
- Listed height: 5 ft 10 in (1.78 m)
- Listed weight: 200 lb (91 kg)

Career information
- High school: East Stroudsburg
- College: Virginia Tech (2011–2014)
- NFL draft: 2015: 6th round, 181st overall pick

Career history

Playing
- Washington Redskins (2015)

Coaching
- Rock Ridge HS (VA) (2016–2017) Defensive backs coach; Washington Redskins (2018) Coaching intern; Washington Redskins (2019) Defensive quality control coach & assistant defensive backs coach; Virginia Tech (2022)* Graduate assistant; Howard (2022–2024) Defensive backs coach; Howard (2025–present) Defensive coordinator & safeties coach

Operations
- Virginia Tech (2021) Assistant director of player personnel

Career NFL statistics
- Total tackles: 58
- Forced fumbles: 1
- Pass deflections: 4
- Stats at Pro Football Reference

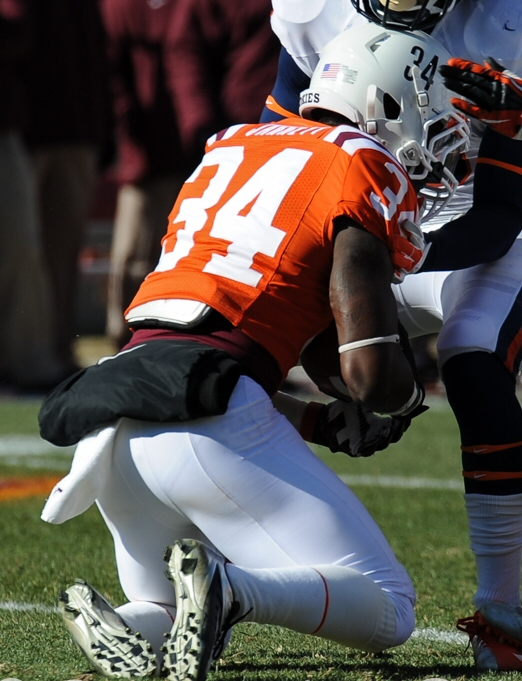
Jarrett with Virginia Tech in 2012

Kyshoen F. Jarrett (born May 4, 1993) is an American professional football coach and former player who is the defensive coordinator and safeties coach for Howard University. He played safety for the Washington Redskins of the National Football League (NFL). He was selected by the Redskins in the sixth round of the 2015 NFL draft after playing college football for the Virginia Tech Hokies.

Jarrett's NFL career lasted just one season after he retired due to suffering severe nerve damage in his shoulder at the end of the season. He served as an assistant coach for the Redskins in 2019 before becoming an executive for the Hokies in 2021.

== Playing career ==
Jarrett attended East Stroudsburg High School South in East Stroudsburg, Pennsylvania before attending Virginia Tech.

Pre-draft measurables
Height	Weight	Arm length	Hand span	40-yard dash	10-yard split	20-yard split	20-yard shuttle	Three-cone drill	Vertical jump	Broad jump	Bench press
5 ft 9 7/8 in (1.77 m)	200 lb (91 kg)	31 in (0.79 m)	9 3/4 in (0.25 m)	4.49 s	1.58 s	2.63 s	4.19 s	6.82 s	33.0 in (0.84 m)	9 ft 11 in (3.02 m)	21 reps
All values from NFL Combine/Pro Day

He was selected by the Washington Redskins in the sixth round (181st overall) of the 2015 NFL draft. He signed his four-year rookie contract on May 11, 2015. During the regular season finale against the Dallas Cowboys, Jarrett suffered severe damage to his brachial plexus during a helmet-to-helmet collision with running back Darren McFadden. Unable to fully regain strength in his arm in the months following the injury, he was waived by the team before the start of training camp in 2016.

== Coaching career ==
In 2018, Jarrett began a coaching internship with the Redskins, and was hired full-time as a defensive quality control coach the following year. He was not retained when the team assembled a new coaching staff following the hiring of Ron Rivera. In June 2021, Jarrett joined the Virginia Tech Hokies as assistant director of player personnel. On February 1, 2022, it was announced that he would be serving as a defensive graduate assistant with the Hokies. However, on February 7, 2022, it was reported that he was expected to join Howard as a defensive backs coach.
