= Ray Rissmiller =

American football player (born 1942)

No. 77, 74
- Position: Offensive tackle

Personal information
- Born: July 22, 1942; Easton, Pennsylvania, U.S.
- Died: April 12, 2022 (aged 79)
- Listed height: 6 ft 4 in (1.93 m)
- Listed weight: 250 lb (113 kg)

Career information
- High school: Easton
- College: Georgia (1961-1964)
- NFL draft: 1965: 2nd round, 20th overall pick
- AFL draft: 1965: 8th round, 64th overall pick

Career history
- Philadelphia Eagles (1966); New Orleans Saints (1967); Buffalo Bills (1968)

Awards and highlights
- First-team All-SEC (1964); Second-team All-SEC (1963)

Career NFL/AFL statistics
- Games played: 16
- Games started: 11
- Stats at Pro Football Reference

Raymond Harold Rissmiller (July 22, 1942—April 12, 2022) was an American professional football player who was an offensive tackle in the National Football League (NFL) for the Philadelphia Eagles and New Orleans Saints. He also played in the American Football League (AFL) for the Buffalo Bills. He played college football for the Georgia Bulldogs.
