= PIAA District 11 =

Coordinates: 40.979°N 75.520°W

- Legal status: Association
- Purpose: High school athletic conference
- Region served: Coal Region; Lehigh Valley; Pocono Mountains
- Members: 53 schools
- Official language: English
- Chairman: Robert Hartman
- Parent organization: Pennsylvania Interscholastic Athletic Association
- Affiliations: Pennsylvania Interscholastic Athletic Association, Schuylkill League, Eastern Pennsylvania Conference, Colonial League
- Website: www.districtxi.com
- Remarks: (570) 460-9075

District 11 (often referenced with the Roman Numerals District XI) of the Pennsylvania Interscholastic Athletic Association (PIAA) is an interscholastic athletic association in eastern Pennsylvania.

District XI is one of the PIAA's 12 districts and comprises high schools mostly within the Lehigh Valley and a few surrounding counties.

The district is broadly considered one of the most competitive high school athletic divisions in the nation with many of its athletes going on to compete in the Olympics and professional sports, including the MLB, NBA, and NFL. District 11 owns many state records for various athletic championships and milestones.

Member schools are categorized by enrollment into classifications, differing in each of the various sports, including: A, AA, AAA, AAAA, AAAAA, and AAAAAA.

== Member schools ==
District 11 is made up of 53 public schools and private schools located in Carbon, Lehigh, Monroe, Northampton, Schuylkill, and parts of Bucks and Pike counties. The district's largest schools compete in the Eastern Pennsylvania Conference with the remaining schools competing in the Colonial League and Schuylkill League.

=== Listing of schools by league ===
==== Eastern Pennsylvania Conference ====
- Allen
- Allentown Central Catholic
- Bethlehem Catholic
- Dieruff
- Easton
- East Stroudsburg North
- East Stroudsburg South
- Emmaus
- Freedom
- Liberty
- Nazareth
- Northampton
- Parkland
- Pleasant Valley
- Pocono Mountain East
- Pocono Mountain West
- Stroudsburg
- Whitehall

==== Colonial League ====
- Bangor
- Catasauqua
- Jim Thorpe
- Lehighton
- Moravian Academy
- Northern Lehigh
- Northwestern Lehigh
- Notre Dame
- Palisades
- Palmerton
- Pen Argyl
- Salisbury
- Saucon Valley
- Southern Lehigh
- Wilson

==== Schuylkill League ====
- Blue Mountain
- Mahanoy
- Marian Catholic
- Minersville
- Nativity BVM
- North Schuylkill
- Panther Valley
- Pine Grove
- Pottsville
- Schuylkill Haven
- Shenandoah Valley
- Tamaqua
- Tri-Valley
- Weatherly
- Williams Valley

==== Atlantic Coast Christian Athletic Conference ====
- Bethlehem Christian
- Lehigh Christian Academy
- Salem Christian School

==== No League ====
- Building 21 High School
- Executive Education Charter School
- Gillingham Charter School
- Lincoln Leadership Academy Charter School
- Notre Dame

Although it is named the Schuylkill League, teams from Carbon, Columbia, and Dauphin counties are included. The Schuylkill League also includes Our Lady of Lourdes Regional School in Northumberland County, which competes in PIAA District 4.

Although parts of Hazleton Area School District are in Schuylkill and Carbon counties, they participate with Luzerne County in District 2.

== Sports ==
District 11 hosts 14 different sports over the three athletic seasons:

- Fall: football, soccer, field hockey, tennis (girls), volleyball (girls), golf, and cross country
- Winter: swimming and diving, wrestling, basketball, and competitive spirit
- Spring: tennis (boys), softball, baseball, volleyball (boys), track and field, and lacrosse

== See also ==
- Colonial League
- Eastern Pennsylvania Conference
