= Dennis Mammana =

Dennis L. Mammana
- Born: September 5, 1951 (age 74); Easton, Pennsylvania, U.S.
- Education: Otterbein College (B.A.); Vanderbilt University (graduate work)
- Occupations: Astronomy writer, lecturer, sky photographer
- Known for: "Stargazers" column; eclipse and aurora expeditions
- Notable work: Six astronomy books; hundreds of articles

Dennis L. Mammana (born September 5, 1951) is an astronomy writer, lecturer, and sky photographer. His newspaper column about astronomy, "Stargazers", has been syndicated since 1992, and he has led many expeditions across six continents on photography and public eclipse and aurora viewing trips.

== Early life and education ==
Mammana was born in Easton, Pennsylvania, on September 4, 1951, He graduated from Easton Area High School in Easton in 1969, and then studied physics and astronomy at Otterbein College in Westerville, Ohio, where he received his B.A. in 1973. After completing work toward his M.S. in astronomy at Vanderbilt University in Nashville, Tennessee, he was awarded a one-year internship at the Strasenburgh Planetarium in Rochester, New York.

== Career ==
Mammana has held positions at the Smithsonian Institution's National Air and Space Museum in Washington, D.C., the Flandrau Science Center and Planetarium at the University of Arizona in Tucson, Arizona, and the Reuben H. Fleet Science Center in San Diego, California.

Mammana has authored six astronomy books for adults and children, and hundreds of magazine, encyclopedia, and web articles.

== Personal life ==
He currently resides in Borrego Springs, California.

== Bibliography ==
- Star Hunters: The Quest to Discover the Secrets of the Universe (Running Press, 1990) ISBN 9780894718755
- The Night Sky: An Observer's Guide (Mallard Press, 1993) ISBN 9780792456896
- Other Suns. Other Worlds? The Search for Extra Solar Planetary Systems ISBN 9780312140212
  - Inne Słońca, Inne Światy?, Proszyński I S-ka, Warsaw, Poland, 1996
- The Backyard Astronomer: A Guide to Stargazing ISBN 9781567993431
