= Alexis Cohen =

American singer (1983–2009)

- Cohen auditioning on American Idol in 2008
- Born: October 17, 1983; New York City, U.S.
- Died: July 25, 2009 (aged 25); Seaside Heights, New Jersey, U.S.
- Occupation: Student

Alexis Cohen (October 17, 1983 – July 25, 2009) was a two-time reality TV show contestant on American Idol who directed an expletive-filled televised rant at the show's judges after comparing her singing style to vocalists Grace Slick, Janis Joplin, and Pat Benatar. She was called "Glitter Girl" in the media.

== Early life and education ==
Cohen was born on October 17, 1983, in Brooklyn, New York City. She attended and graduated from East Stroudsburg North High School in Dingmans Ferry, Pennsylvania. She then attended Montgomery Community College, where she studied veterinary medicine.

She lived in Allentown, Pennsylvania with her mother, Mindy Dallow.

== Singing career ==
Cohen's first audition on American Idol was in American Idol season 7 in Philadelphia, where she sang "Somebody to Love" by Jefferson Airplane. All three judges voted no, and she was eliminated from the season 7 competition.

Cohen returned for a second audition in 2009 for American Idol season 8 in Boston, singing "Like a Prayer" by Madonna. She again reacted negatively on camera after judge Simon Cowell called her performance "horrendous".

== Death ==
On July 25, 2009, Cohen was struck by a hit and run driver in Seaside Heights, New Jersey. Her body was found by two passersby along a road about 4am. Paramedics performed lifesaving efforts before they arrived with Cohen at Community Medical Center in Toms River, where, at age 25, she was pronounced dead at 6:35am.

Daniel Bark of Toms River, New Jersey, aged 27, was later arrested and indicted for drunk and reckless driving, manslaughter, and leaving the scene of an accident.

Bark, who had a previous 2004 DUI conviction, was fleeing police who were pursuing him after his involvement in a previous vehicular accident when he struck and killed Cohen after failing to stop as a bicycle patrol officer ordered him to do so. In November 2011, Bark accepted a plea agreement and pleaded guilty to eluding police and drunk driving. Prosecutors dismissed manslaughter and other charges in the deadly traffic accident. A judge quashed Bark's confession because police failed to advise him of his rights.

Cohen's death was covered by People, Entertainment Weekly, MTV, Rolling Stone, ABC News, and New York Daily News.

Cohen was interred at Keneseth Israel Cemetery in Allentown, Pennsylvania.
