= East Stroudsburg Area School District =

School district in Pennsylvania

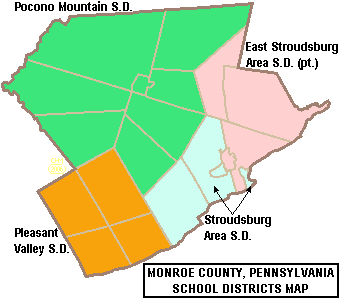
- Map of school districts in Monroe County, Pennsylvania, including East Stroudsburg Area School District

Address
- 50 Vine Street East Stroudsburg, Monroe County and Pike County, Pennsylvania, 18301; United States

District information
- Type: Public
- Schools: East Stroudsburg High School North, East Stroudsburg High School South and eight others
- Budget: $164.944 million
- NCES District ID: 4208670

Students and staff
- Students: 6,383 (2022-23)
- Teachers: 508.00 (on an FTE basis)
- Student–teacher ratio: 12.56
- Athletic conference: Eastern Pennsylvania Conference

Other information
- Website: www.esasd.net

East Stroudsburg Area School District (ESASD) is a large, rural public school district located in Monroe and Pike Counties in the Pocono Mountain region of Northeastern Pennsylvania. The district is one of the 500 public school districts of Pennsylvania. East Stroudsburg Area School District encompasses approximately 214 square miles (550 km^{2}). The district's headquarters are located on North Courtland Street in East Stroudsburg, Pennsylvania.

The district is the second largest in the county in terms of territory and is split into two parts: South and North. In Monroe County the district serves East Stroudsburg, Smithfield Township, Middle Smithfield Township, and Price Township. In Pike County the district serves: Lehman Township and Porter Township. According to 2000 federal census data, East Stroudsburg Area School District served a resident population of 37,604. By 2010, the District's population had increased to 47,919 people.

In 2009, the District residents’ per capita income was $19,235, while the median family income was $19,238. In the Commonwealth, the median family income was $49,501 and the United States median family income was $49,445, in 2010. According to District officials, in school year 2007-08, East Stroudsburg Area School District (ESASD) provided basic educational services to 8,143 pupils. It employed: 657 teachers, 453 full-time and part-time support personnel, and 36 administrators. East Stroudsburg Area School District received more than $27.4 million in state funding in school year 2007-08. In school year 2009-10, ESASD provided basic educational services to 8,017 pupils. It employed: 644 teachers, 667 full-time and part-time support personnel. The district had increased its administration to 46 administrators despite a significant decline in enrollment. East Stroudsburg Area School District received more than $30.7 million in state funding in school year 2009-10. In 2013, 209 pupils are attending charter schools.

At the time of its conception in 1891, East Stroudsburg Area School District consisted of only one high school and intermediate school. However, due to rapid growth in the area in the 1980s and 1990s, the district split into two parts: South and North. Since 2000, they are split in terms of athletics and schools, but have the same district leaders. The South high school is located in East Stroudsburg Borough and the North high school is located in Lehman Township in Pike County.

High school students may choose to attend Monroe Career & Tech Institute for training. The Colonial Intermediate Unit IU20 provides the District with a wide variety of services like specialized education for disabled students and hearing, speech and visual disability services and professional development for staff and faculty.

== Schools ==
East Stroudsburg Area School District operates six elementary schools that house students from kindergarten to fifth grade, two intermediate schools with sixth to eighth grades, and two high schools with ninth through twelfth grades.

- Bushkill Elementary School
- Resica Elementary School
- Middle Smithfield Elementary School
- Smithfield Elementary School
- J M Hill Elementary School
- East Stroudsburg Elementary School
- J T Lambert Intermediate
- Lehman Intermediate School
- East Stroudsburg High School South
- East Stroudsburg High School North

== Extracurriculars ==
The district's high schools compete in the Eastern Pennsylvania Conference, an 18-team super league of the largest high schools from the Poconos and Lehigh Valley.

=== Mascot ===
The mascot of East Stroudsburg Area School District was originally only the cavalier, or "cav" for short. However, because of the split, North's mascot became the timberwolf or "T-WOLF". The cavalier is now just the South's mascot.
