= Easton Area High School =

Location
- 2601 William Penn Highway; Easton, Pennsylvania 18045; United States; 40.682°N 75.252°W

Information
- Type: Public high school
- Motto: Educating for Life's Journey
- School district: Easton Area School District
- NCES School ID: 420885003482
- Principal: Kyle Geiger
- Staff: 166.5 (on an FTE basis)
- Grades: 9th–12th
- Enrollment: 2,778 (2024–25)
- Student to teacher ratio: 16.68
- Campus type: Suburb: Large
- Colors: Red and white
- Athletics conference: Eastern Pennsylvania Conference
- Mascot: Red Rover
- Rival: Phillipsburg High School
- Accreditations: Pennsylvania Department of Education and Middle States Association of Colleges and Schools
- Website: eahs.eastonsd.org

Easton Area High School is a large four-year public high school located in Easton, Pennsylvania in the Lehigh Valley area of eastern Pennsylvania. It is one of nine public schools and the only high school in the Easton Area School District.

As of the 2024–25 school year, Easton Area High School had an enrollment of 2,778 students, according to National Center for Education Statistics data. Easton offers 26 advanced placement courses. Easton's proficiency levels on state assessments track slightly higher than the state average. Over 85% of Easton students attend institutions of higher learning after high school, with about 45% going to four-year colleges. Over 46% of Easton students qualify for free or reduced lunch under Title I federal funds.

The school's colors are red and white, though black is used in many of the school's sports uniforms, and its mascot is the Red Rover.

== Academics ==
In 1996 and again in 1998, Easton Area High School won the Scholastic Scrimmage contest, where Pennsylvania high schools compete against each other in academic trivia. The school's Model United Nations team consistently places in the top three schools at the High School Model United Nations Conference, held annually at Lehigh University in neighboring Bethlehem, Pennsylvania. The team placed third in 2011 and second in 2010. In 2012, the team won first place overall at Lehigh, and returned for a conference with real delegates.

== Athletics ==
Easton Area High School competes athletically in the Eastern Pennsylvania Conference (EPC) in the District XI division of the Pennsylvania Interscholastic Athletic Association. Easton holds the third-most championships in all sports in the Lehigh Valley Conference, the predecessor to the Eastern Pennsylvania Conference, behind Parkland High School and Emmaus High School.

The school's football field is Cottingham Stadium, one of the nation's oldest and most iconic high school football stadiums. The school's indoor arena, used by its wrestling and basketball teams, is 25th Street Gymnasium, located in Palmer Township.

Easton is widely known for the success of its wrestling team. For 68 consecutive years, from 1948 to 2015, Easton produced at least one district champion in what came to be known as The Streak. The school also holds the record for the most recorded Lehigh Valley Conference championships in girls track and field. In 2019, the ranking and review site Niche ranked Easton Area High School as the 28th-best public school in Pennsylvania for athletics. The cheerleading team consistently places within the top 10 at UCA Nationals, held annually in Orlando, Florida.

Easton fields varsity teams in baseball, basketball, cheerleading, cross country, field hockey, football, golf, ice hockey, indoor track, lacrosse, soccer, softball, swimming, tennis, track and field, volleyball, and wrestling.

=== Football ===
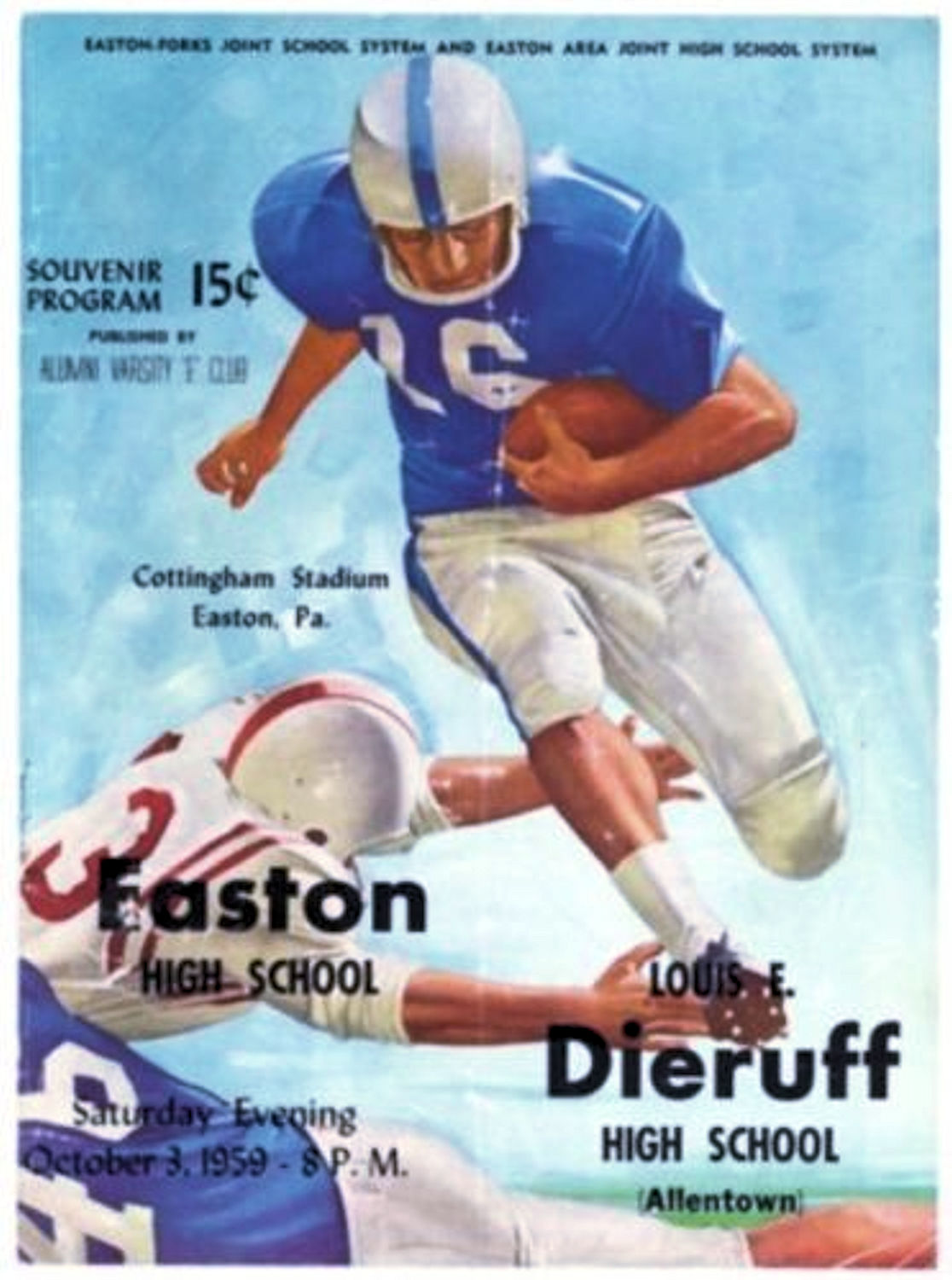
Program for the Dieruff High School vs. Easton Area High School football game at Cottingham Stadium in Easton on October 3, 1959

Easton launched its football program in 1894. The program has an all-time record of 822–344–52, representing the sixth-most career wins of any high school in the nation nationally and second-most in Pennsylvania behind only Mount Carmel by 11 wins for the most in Pennsylvania history.

Over 110 season of football, Easton has posted 15 undefeated seasons. In only 18 seasons during these 110 seasons has the team posted a losing record. Before the PIAA instituted its playoff system in 1988, state champions were crowned by state poll, with Easton earning state titles in three seasons, in 1939, 1958, and 1968. Since the advent of the state playoff system, Easton has advanced to state semifinals in 1991, 1993, 2003, and 2004 and the state quarterfinals in 2009, 2010 and 2025 in 4A, the largest classification in Pennsylvania. As of 2016, Easton began competing in 6A, the largest of the new six school classifications.

Easton competes in the Eastern Pennsylvania Conference in the PIAA's District XI. Easton has won the District XI 4A championship seven times (1990, 1991, 1993, 2003, 2004, 2009, 2010, and 2025) since the District XI playoffs were instituted in 1985. The school has played in the District XI finals 17 times during this period. Easton has won 24 conference championships in its history, winning the Big Five in 1937, 1939, 1943, 1950, 1951, 1958, 1959, 1961, and 1962, the Eastern Big Eight in 1966, 1967, 1968, and 1974, the Eastern Pennsylvania Conference in 1978, 1986, 1987, and 1991, the Mountain Valley Conference in 2001, and the Lehigh Valley Conference in 2003, 2004, 2009, and 2012, and the EPC South in 2014. Easton is a member of the East Penn Conference Southern Division, formed in 2014, which combined members of the Lehigh Valley Conference and Mountain Valley Conference.

Easton has had 48 players selected to the Associated Press All-State team, including Ray Rissmiller (1959 and 1960), an All-SEC tackle at Georgia, who played for the Philadelphia Eagles, New Orleans Saints, and Buffalo Bills. Thirty Easton players have been selected to play in the prestigious Big 33 all-star game. In 1993, Easton tailback Juan Gaddy was just the third player in Pennsylvania history to rush for over 5,000 career yards, made a pair of AP All-State teams, and was MVP of the Big 33 game.

Easton is historically known for strong, physical defenses and a power running game. Easton has allowed less than 10 points per game more for a season 35 times since World War II, including nine years giving up less than a touchdown per game.

Since 1912, there have only been eight head coaches of Easton's football team. James Reilly coached from 1912 to 1930, missing 1918 to serve in World War I, and posted a career record of 129–21–10, setting program records for wins and winning percentage. After an unsuccessful stint by John Kressler from 1931 to 1934, former NFL running back Bird Carroll took over the program, posting a career record of 74–31–8 from 1935 to 1946, and winning the 1939 Pennsylvania state championship. Carroll was succeeded by Bob Rute, the quarterback on the 1939 team and Easton's first All-State selection. After a successful playing career at Duke and service in the U.S. Army during World War II, Rute coached at Easton from 1948 to 1967, posting a career record of 131–56–9, which broke Reilly's all-time wins record. Rute's 1958 team was inducted into the Easton Hall of Fame in 2014 and is generally regarded as the strongest team in school history.

After Rute retired, he was replaced by his defensive coordinator, Wayne Grube, who went 81-44-7 from 1968 to 1979, winning a Pennsylvania state title in his first season and finishing second in Pennsylvania with a 10-0-1 record in 1978. Bob Shriver coached from 1980 to 1992, posting a career record of 105–50–2, and led Easton to their first state playoff appearance in 1991, where they lost in the state semifinals. Shriver was succeeded by Steve Shiffert, who had been on Shriver's staff as the offensive line coach. Shiffert holds the all-time wins record at Easton, with a career record of 216–89–1, and has six conference and five District XI championships. His 216 wins are fifth in District XI history and second among active coaches. He led Easton to the state semifinals in 1993, 2003, and 2004 and state quarterfinals in 2009 and 2010. Shiffert also posted a 17–6–1 record in Thanksgiving Day games against Phillipsburg High School, Easton's archrival. In January 2017, Shiffert was fired after a 7–6 season. He was replaced by longtime assistant coach Jeff Braido, who began his career in the 2017 season.

Easton has played their home games at Cottingham Stadium since 1924. Named for former Easton School District superintendent William Cottingham, Cottingham Stadium is one of the oldest high school football venues in Pennsylvania and is often recognized as one of the most iconic stadiums in the state. Lights were installed in 1953, and it seats approximately 5,500. Cottingham Stadium is located in Easton's West Ward, across the street from the old high school building, which now is Paxinosa Elementary School.

==== Phillipsburg High School rivalry ====
Easton has a long-standing rivalry with Phillipsburg High School in Phillipsburg, New Jersey, which dates back 120 years, to 1905, and is ongoing. The two teams play an annual Thanksgiving Day football game at Lafayette College's Fisher Field, which is considered one of the nation's longest-standing high school rivalries.

The game, which typically draws over 20,000 fans, has been televised nationally. The 1988 game, which was broadcast on ESPN, was the first high school football game to be broadcast on national television. The 100th-anniversary game played in 2006 and won by Easton 21–7, was broadcast on ESPN2. Easton leads the overall series with 61 wins; Phillipsburg has 42, and the teams have tied five times. One of these ties, the 1993 game, was resolved as part of the Gatorade REPLAY series. The Easton and Phillipsburg teams from 1993 were brought back to play a rematch in early April 2009; Phillipsburg won the game 27–12.

The rivalry between the two schools started in 1905 and became an annual game starting in 1914, but was not made a Thanksgiving tradition until 1916. Easton won the 2024 game, the 117th in the rivalry, by a score of 17–14 in overtime and holds the overall lead with a record of 68–44–5. NJ.com listed the rivalry in the second spot on their 2017 list "Ranking the 31 fiercest rivalries in N.J. HS football", saying that the only thing that kept it from being top-ranked was the fact that one of the schools is not in New Jersey.

=== Wrestling ===
Easton has one of the strongest high school wrestling programs in the country, with an all-time dual meet record of 925–223–15. Easton is second overall in Pennsylvania history with 35 state champions, including 1984 Summer Olympics gold medalist Bobby Weaver (1975, 1976, 1977), two-time NCAA champion Jack Cuvo (1983, 1984, 1985), Jordan Oliver (2006, 2007, 2008), two-time NCAA finalist and University of Nebraska associate head coach Bryan Snyder (1997), NCAA All-Americans Jamarr Billman (1996, 1997), Mitchell Minotti (2011), and former North Carolina State football coach Chuck Amato (1965). Easton has produced 185 PIAA District 11 champions, 116 Northeast Regional Champions, 127 PIAA state medalists, 55 PIAA state finalists, and 35 PIAA state champions. On the collegiate level, Easton wrestlers have earned 21 NCAA Division I All-Americans honors, eight NCAA Finals appearances, and four NCAA championships.

The program was started in 1947 by assistant football coach Gust Zarnas, a former All-American offensive lineman at Ohio State and a member of the College Football Hall of Fame. Dick Rutt was Easton's first state champion, winning the 105-pound weight class in 1949. From 1948 to 2015, Easton crowned at least one champion at the District 11 Tournament in every season, setting a Pennsylvania record known as The Streak. Former Easton coaches John Maitland, Dave Crowell, and Steve Powell are all members of the National Wrestling Hall of Fame. Powell retired in 2016 after 32 years as the head coach with a career record of 532–126–3, four state championships, and four state duals championships. He coached 19 individual state champions, third most of any coach in Pennsylvania history. His eight combined state titles are the most of any coach in Pennsylvania history.

Since the PIAA began crowning a team champion at the state tournament in 1976, Easton has won six state championships (1981, 1983, 1996, 1997, 2001, 2002) and finished in the top five in 18 separate seasons. Pennsylvania added a State Dual tournament in 1999, which Easton won four years in a row from 2001 to 2004. Easton has qualified for Pennsylvaia's State Dual Finals eight times, a Pennsylvania record, and their four championships are tied for the most in the state.

Since the advent of national rankings by publications such as Amateur Wrestling News and Wrestling USA, Easton has been a consistent presence in these publications' national rankings. In 1996, 1997, 2001, and 2002, Easton was the No. 1 public school wrestling team in the country. Easton finished in the top five nationally in 1996, 1997, 2001, 2002, and 2004 and earned national rankings 14 times between 1989 and 2011. Wrestling USA named Easton the third-best high school wrestling program and the best public school wrestling program in the nation throughput the 1990s.

Easton is coached by Jamarr Billman, a two-time state champion for the Red Rovers and a three-time NCAA All-American at Penn State and Lock Haven University of Pennsylvania and the first African-American head coach in any boys sport at Easton. Billman has been an assistant coach at Cornell University, Wilson Area High School, and at Easton.

On January 19, 2023, Easton wrestling won their 1,000th career team win, defeating Council Rock High School South in a home match at 25th Street Gym.

== Ensembles and marching band ==
The high school's choir recently won first place at the Heritage Festival in Virginia Beach. the choir has six parts: the Concert Choir (for singers grades 10–12), the Freshman Choir, the Treble Choir for all female and high voices, including countertenors, the Camerata, the Bass Choir for all male and low voices, the Chamber Singers and the Jazz Chorale. Some students from the EAHS Choir also participate in the PMEA District 10 and Region V Choirs.

=== Instrumental music ===
Easton is also home to an instrumental music program. Many students take part in the various high school ensembles. Instrumental music consists of 9th Grade Concert Band, 10th-12th Grade Concert Band, Marching Band, 9th Grade String Ensemble, Symphony Orchestra, and Jazz Lab. Select groups which require audition include Wind Ensemble, Chamber Strings, Jazz Band, who went to Germany in May 2023, and Pit Orchestra, who plays music in the annual musical.

=== Red Rover marching band ===
The Red Rover marching band contains approximately 300 students. Significant accomplishments include performances at the 1993 Rose Bowl. Also, the 1998 Orange Bowl the 2003 Orange Bowl, those two times they also performed their own half-time show during a Jacksonville Jaguars game, and the Second inauguration of George W. Bush (2005).

The competitive band has also traveled to Florida for the Disney High Honors program in both 2007 and 2009. In 2010, the band traveled to San Diego to perform in the Port of San Diego Bay Balloon Parade and the 2010 Holiday Bowl. In 2012, the Red Rover Marching Band made an appearance in Orlando, Florida, and in 2014, the Red Rover Marching Band performed their field show in the 2014 Orange Bowl. In 2015, they marched in the Miss America parade, and in December 2017, they made their first appearance at the 2017 Fiesta Bowl in Glendale, Arizona. They have also participated in the 2020 Gator Bowl in Jacksonville, Florida. In December 2023, the band again traveled to Disney World in Orlando for the Disney High Honors Program.

== Notable alumni ==
- Chuck Amato, former head football coach, North Carolina State
- Lisa Ann, adult film actress
- Steve Aponavicius, all-time leading scorer in Boston College Eagles football history
- Tom Curley, former chief executive officer, Associated Press, and USA Today's first editor
- Omar Doom, actor and musician, Inglourious Basterds
- Kathryn E. Granahan, 32nd Treasurer of the United States
- Bill Hoffman, former professional football player, Frankford Yellow Jackets and Pottsville Maroons
- Christopher Lennertz, film music composer, Emmy nominee, and Grammy Award winner
- Dennis Mammana, nationally syndicated astronomy columnist, lecturer, and sky photographer
- Peyton C. March, former U.S. Army Chief of Staff
- Jordan Oliver, mixed martial arts fighter and two-time NCAA wrestling champion at Oklahoma State
- Chanelle Price, 800-meter World Athletics Indoor Championships gold medal winner, 2014
- Sally Jessy Raphael, former television talk show host, Sally
- Ray Rissmiller, former professional football player, Buffalo Bills, New Orleans Saints, and Philadelphia Eagles
- Bobby Weaver, 1984 Summer Olympics gold medalist in wrestling
- Roger Ross Williams, Academy Award-winning filmmaker, Music by Prudence
- David Zippel, lyricist

== Notable coaches and faculty ==
- Pete Carril, former junior varsity basketball coach (1954-1958), NBA coach, Sacramento Kings, and college basketball coach, Princeton and Lehigh
