= East Stroudsburg High School South =

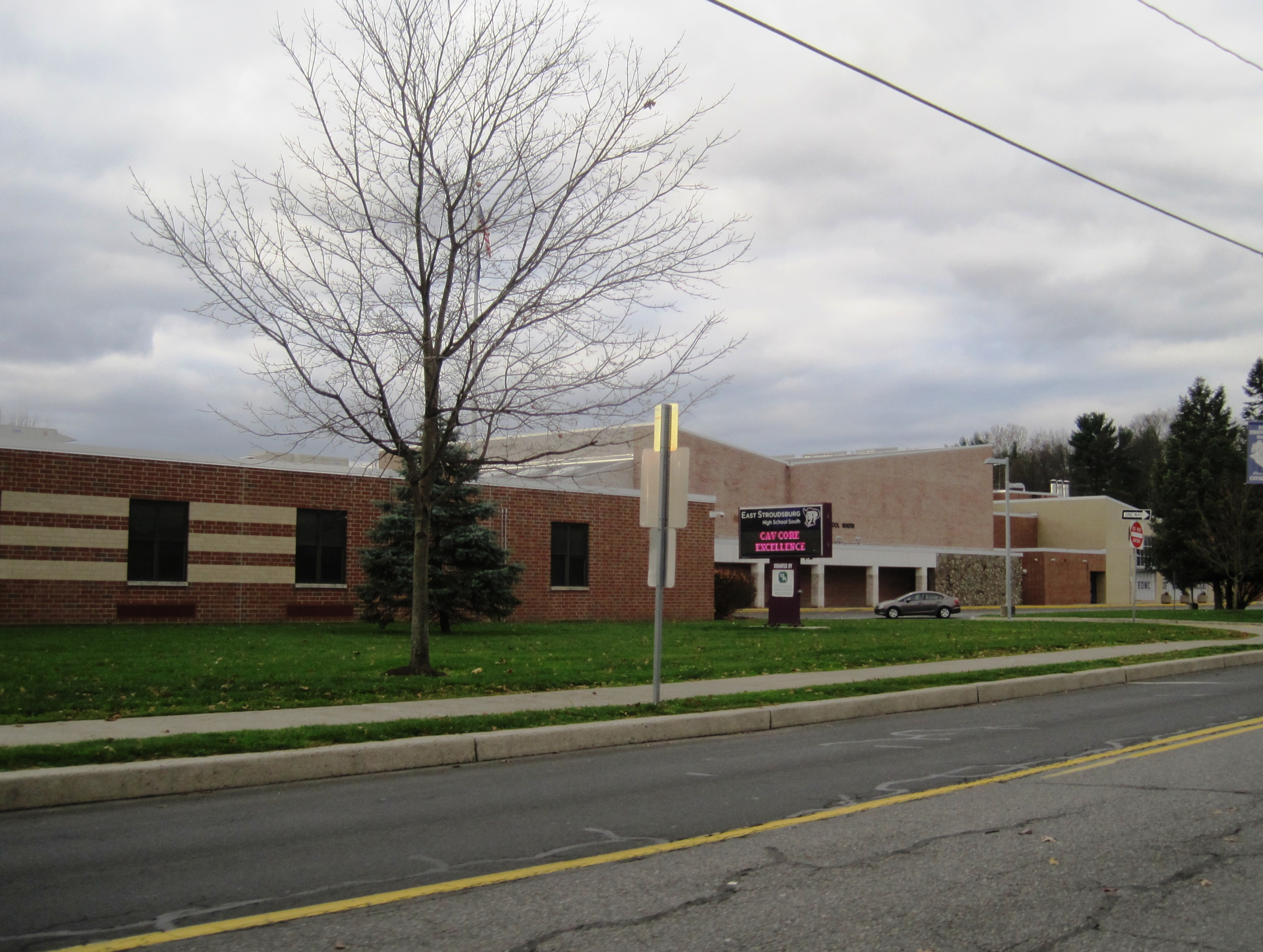
- East Stroudsburg High School South

Location
- 279 North Courtland Street; East Stroudsburg, (Monroe County), Pennsylvania 18301; United States; 41.00621°N 75.18579°W

Information
- Type: Public high school
- Motto: Success for All
- Established: 1893
- School district: East Stroudsburg Area School District
- CEEB code: 391150
- NCES School ID: 420867006935
- Principal: Matthew Triolo
- Teaching staff: 93.50 (on an FTE basis)
- Grades: 9–12
- Enrollment: 1,320 (2023–2024)
- Student to teacher ratio: 14.12
- Colors: Purple and white
- Athletics: Eastern Pennsylvania Conference
- Mascot: Cavalier
- Nickname: Cavs, Eastburg, South
- Rival: Stroudsburg High School
- Newspaper: The Cavalier Times
- Website: south.esasd.net

East Stroudsburg High School South is a public high school located at 279 North Courtland Street in East Stroudsburg in Monroe County, Pennsylvania, United States. The school's mascot is the cavalier. The school is part of the East Stroudsburg Area School District.

As of the 2022-23 school year, the school had an enrollment of 1,338 students, according to National Center for Education Statistics data. The student-to-teacher ratio is 1 teacher to 14.68 students, roughly in line with the state average of 15.1. The student body is 62.9% White, 17.6% African American, 17.1% Hispanic or Latino of any race, 2.3% Asian American, and less than 1% Native American.

- Address: 279 North Courtland Street, East Stroudsburg, PA 18301
- Mascot: Cavalier (Teams are often referred to as the "Cavs" or "Eastburg South")
- Colors: Purple and White
- Athletics Conference: Eastern Pennsylvania Conference (EPC)
- Primary Rivalry: Stroudsburg High School, featuring the historic annual "Turkey Day" football rivalry game played on Thanksgiving.

== Scheduling ==
The school uses a block scheduling system. Each block is 90 minutes long, except for Block 3 which is 120 minutes total. Most classes are a full block in length and last one semester. Other classes can be one period or one block in length for both semesters, or one period for one semester, depending on the course. Each period is 45 minutes, except during Block 3. Periods 1 and 2 are in Block 1; Periods 3 and 4 in Block 2; Periods 9 and 10 are in Block 4. The remaining four periods (5, 6, 7, and 8) are during Block 3, and are each 30 minutes, one of which is a lunch period. Lunch can occur during any of those four periods, and students typically have one class for the remaining three periods of Block 3. Bells ring throughout the school to indicate class start and end times.

== School map ==
The school is split into two divisions: the Maple Building and the regular building. These two buildings are connected by a single hallway, which runs by the cafeteria.

== Renovation ==
The school has undergone a 92-million-dollar renovation project. The district added a new 3-story wing, cafeteria, and Gym as well as renovating the existing building. The stadium has been fitted with a turf field, an all-weather track, and improvements to the visitors' team's stands.

The current spot of the Bunnell School has been made into a faculty parking area. Another building torn down for parking was the old District Administration building, the former North Courtland Elementary School.

== South Side Live ==
Every morning, after the first block, teachers turn on their TVs for South Side Live, a student broadcast generally about 10 minutes long. It is a morning announcement about updates in the school, such as weather, announcements for activities and sports. It will often include videos featuring special school events or important events occurring worldwide. The school's Studio Broadcasting class produces the broadcast.

== Athletics ==
East Stroudsburg South competes athletically in the Eastern Pennsylvania Conference (EPC) in the District XI division of the Pennsylvania Interscholastic Athletic Association, one of the premier high school athletic divisions in the nation.

East Stroudsburg South has a thriving athletic tradition. Many of its teams have won several awards throughout the school's history. Current sports offered at this school are the following, along with their records for the most recent competition season in parentheses:

=== Accomplishments ===
The boys' 1993–94 basketball team advanced to the District XI AAAA Basketball semi-finals eventually losing to the State Champion Chester High School
The boys' 1995 football team won the District XI championship beating Stroudsburg High School and then lost to Plymouth-Whitemarsh High School in the state playoffs.
The girls' 2006–07 basketball team advanced the PIAA quarterfinal playoffs, but lost to Council Rock North High School.
The boys' 2009 football team advanced to the District XI semifinals before losing to Parkland High School.
The boys' 2010 football team advanced to the District XI semifinals before losing to Easton Area High School
The girls' 2011 tennis team advanced to the District XI finals before losing to Parkland High School.
The boys' 2017–18 basketball team won the District XI championship beating Northampton High School after winning the Eastern Pennsylvania Conference Mountain Division title and advanced to the PIAA first round before losing to Neshaminy High School
The boys' 2018 football team beat Pocono Mountain East High School to win the District XI AAAAA championship.
The coed cheerleading team beat Pocono Mountain West High School to win the 2018-2019 District XI Coed Cheerleading championship.

=== Turkey Day Rivalry ===
East Stroudsburg High School has always found a firm rivalry with its neighbors Stroudsburg High School. They have played every year since 1945, and starting in 1952—with a few exceptions—the teams have met on Thanksgiving morning is what is known as the Turkey Day Game. The winning team receives the Little Brown Jug trophy, which stays with the winning school until the next Turkey Day Game. If the winner is away, they walk home with a police escort through the other team's town, a tradition that began in 1967. The competition has gained the attention of Sports Illustrated. The rivalry is presented in the American football on Thanksgiving page.

From 1995–98, the teams met during the regular season. Starting in 1999, they began playing each other twice each year, once during the regular season and again on Thanksgiving. The early games do not count in the Turkey Day rivalry records.

Through 2013, Stroudsburg holds a 37–26–5 edge over East Stroudsburg South in the Little Brown Jug series.

Outcomes since 1945:

Year	W	L	Score	Winning Coach
1945	Stroudsburg	East Stroudsburg	42–0	Stulgaitis
1946	Stroudsburg	East Stroudsburg	39–0	Stulgaitis
1947	Stroudsburg	East Stroudsburg	34–6	Stulgaitis
1948	Stroudsburg	East Stroudsburg	27–0	Stulgaitis
1949	Stroudsburg	East Stroudsburg	6–0	Stulgaitis
1950	Stroudsburg	East Stroudsburg	13–0	Stulgaitis
1951	Stroudsburg	East Stroudsburg	15–14	Stulgaitis
1952	East Stroudsburg	Stroudsburg	7–0	Kist
1953	East Stroudsburg	Stroudsburg	16–7	Kist
1954	East Stroudsburg	Stroudsburg	31–7	Kist
1955	TIE	TIE	7–7	TIE
1956	TIE	TIE	6–6	TIE
1957	Stroudsburg	East Stroudsburg	13–12	Whitehead
1958	East Stroudsburg	Stroudsburg	13–7	Kist
1959	TIE	TIE	6–6	TIE
1960	East Stroudsburg	Stroudsburg	48–6	Kist
1961	East Stroudsburg	Stroudsburg	45–20	Kist
1962	East Stroudsburg	Stroudsburg	14–0	Kist
1963	Stroudsburg	East Stroudsburg	6–0	Stulgaitis
1964	Stroudsburg	East Stroudsburg	7–6	Silock
1965	Stroudsburg	East Stroudsburg	19–0	Silock
1966	Stroudsburg	East Stroudsburg	19–0	Silock
1967	East Stroudsburg	Stroudsburg	32–12	Merring
1968	Stroudsburg	East Stroudsburg	12–7	Silock
1969	Stroudsburg	East Stroudsburg	12–8	Ross
1970	Stroudsburg	East Stroudsburg	34–14	Ross
1971	Stroudsburg	East Stroudsburg	41–6	Ross
1972	East Stroudsburg	Stroudsburg	9–0	Merring
1973	East Stroudsburg	Stroudsburg	20–18	Merring
1974	East Stroudsburg	Stroudsburg	31–26	Merring
1975	TIE	TIE	7–7	TIE
1976	Stroudsburg	East Stroudsburg	28–0	Ross
1977	Stroudsburg	East Stroudsburg	33–18	Ross
1978	East Stroudsburg	Stroudsburg	16–7	Merring
1979	Stroudsburg	East Stroudsburg	32–13	Ross
1980	East Stroudsburg	Stroudsburg	24–0	Merring
1981	Stroudsburg	East Stroudsburg	12–7	Ross
1982	Stroudsburg	East Stroudsburg	9–8	Ross
1983	Stroudsburg	East Stroudsburg	21–10	Ross
1984	Stroudsburg	East Stroudsburg	28–17	Ross
1985	Stroudsburg	East Stroudsburg	7–6	Ross
1986	Stroudsburg	East Stroudsburg	14–9	Ross
1987	East Stroudsburg	Stroudsburg	17–3	Christian
1988	East Stroudsburg	Stroudsburg	14–7	Christian
1989	TIE	TIE	7–7	TIE
1990	Stroudsburg	East Stroudsburg	20–13	Ross
1991	Stroudsburg	East Stroudsburg	33–16	Ross
1992	Stroudsburg	East Stroudsburg	21-6	Ross
1993	East Stroudsburg	Stroudsburg	23–16	Christian
1994	Stroudsburg	East Stroudsburg	28–19	Ross
1995	East Stroudsburg	Stroudsburg	28–10	Christian
1996	East Stroudsburg	Stroudsburg	64–7	Christian
1997	Stroudsburg	East Stroudsburg	14–0	Ross
1998	East Stroudsburg	Stroudsburg	36–13	Christian
1999	Stroudsburg	ES South	28–13	Ross
2000	Stroudsburg	ES South	24–23 (2OT)	Ross
2001	Stroudsburg	ES South	33–20	Ross
2002	ES South	Stroudsburg	12–7	Christian
2003	ES South	Stroudsburg	49–12	Christian
2004	ES South	Stroudsburg	13–10 (OT)	Christian
2005	Stroudsburg	ES South	10–7	Ross
2006	ES South	Stroudsburg	14–7	Christian
2007	ES South	Stroudsburg	22–21	Christian
2008	ES South	Stroudsburg	34–0	Christian
2009	ES South	Stroudsburg	42–0	Christian
2010	Stroudsburg	ES South	36–35	Ross
2011	Stroudsburg	ES South	21-0	Bernard
2012	Stroudsburg	ES South	37-17	Bernard
2013	Stroudsburg	ES South	26-14	Miller

All-Time Turkey Day W-L-T Pct. (Coaches):

Coach	W	L	T	Pct.
Kist	7	8	3	0.472
Merring	6	7	1	0.464
Christian	13	19	1	0.394

=== Clubs and activities ===
- Spring Production/Musical
- Marching band
- Jazz band
- Choraliers
- Choralettes
- Chess Team
- Mock Trial
- Reading Olympics
- Scholastic Scrimmage
- Speech and Debate
- Model United Nations
- FBLA
- SADD
- Key Club
- Science Olympiad
- Step Team
- Envirothon
- Math/Computer Club
- Philosophy Club
- Glee Club
- Wilderness Club
- Anime Club
- DECA
- Go Club
- Physics Club
- Gay-Straight Alliance
- Multicultural Affairs
- Performance Club
- Green Team
- Student Government
- Newspaper

=== Music program ===
East Stroudsburg South has a thriving music program. Concert Choir and Concert Band are offered as electives during school, and the choir currently consists of over 200 members, while the band contains almost 100 members. The school regularly sends several students to PMEA District Chorus, Band, and Orchestra festivals. The school also offers extracurricular musical activities, such as Marching Band, Jazz Band, Choraliers, and the musical.

=== Choraliers ===
The Choraliers are the select choir in East Stroudsburg South. In order to be eligible, a student must be enrolled in the regular Chorus class and audition successfully for a spot. The group usually is composed of about 40 members. All grade levels in the school are represented in the group. The Choraliers function as the chorus that represents the entire school at school district events. They also are evaluated at adjudications and participated in Music in the Parks at Hersheypark in 2009 and 2011, both times winning best overall high school choir with a superior rating.

==== Musical ====
Every year, East Stroudsburg South stages a musical. These musicals have been praised for the participants' musicianship, acting, and the show's overall production. They receive many nominations at the annual Spotlight Awards at the Sherman Theater, several of which result in awards.

Year	Musical
1997	Into the Woods
1998	Joseph and the Amazing Technicolor Dreamcoat
1999	Anything Goes
2000	Brigadoon
2001	Fiddler on the Roof
2002	Kiss Me, Kate
2003	Annie Get Your Gun
2004	Man of La Mancha
2005	Pirates of Penzance
2006	Titanic
2007	Seven Brides for Seven Brothers
2008	Babes in Arms
2009	Pippin
2010	The Secret Garden
2011	Les Misérables
2012	Joseph and the Amazing Technicolor Dreamcoat
2013	Carousel
2014	Bye Bye Birdie
2015	The Adventures of Tom Sawyer
2016	Once Upon A Mattress
2017	Anything Goes
2022	The Lightning Thief
2023	The Little Mermaid

== Academic clubs ==
East Stroudsburg South has several clubs that compete against other schools, including FBLA and DECA. The chess team and speech and debate teams regularly placed in the top three of the former Mountain Valley Conference, and the Science Olympiad team consistently finished in the top half of the regional competition.

In 2010, one of the Reading Olympics teams placed first at the regional competition at Easton Area High School. In 2011, one of the teams placed third. In 2012, one of the Reading Olympics teams placed first with a score of 72.

In 2011, the Mock Trial team placed first at the Monroe County Bar Association Invitational.

In 2012, the Science Olympiad team qualified for the state finals for the first time in school history, placing second overall at the regional finals.

In 2013, one of the Envirothon teams placed 1st at the county Envirothon and qualified for the state finals, the first team from the school to do so in school history.

== Notable alumni ==
- Rosemary Brown, politician
- Kyshoen Jarrett, former professional football player, Washington Redskins
- Darryl Longdon, professional soccer player, Dominica
- James Mungro, former professional football player, Indianapolis Colts
- Ken Parrish, former professional football player, Florida Tuskers of the United Football League
- Robopop, music producer and songwriter
- Jimmy Terwilliger, head football coach, East Stroudsburg University of Pennsylvania
