= James Mungro =

American football player (born 1978)

No. 23
- Position: Running back

Personal information
- Born: February 13, 1978 (age 48); East Stroudsburg, Pennsylvania, U.S.
- Listed height: 5 ft 9 in (1.75 m)
- Listed weight: 214 lb (97 kg)

Career information
- High school: East Stroudsburg South
- College: Syracuse
- NFL draft: 2002: undrafted

Career history
- Detroit Lions (2002)*; Indianapolis Colts (2002–2006)
- * Offseason or practice squad member only

Awards and highlights
- Super Bowl champion (XLI)

Career NFL statistics
- Rushing attempts: 133
- Rushing yards: 430
- Rushing touchdowns: 10
- Receptions: 24
- Receiving touchdowns: 3
- Stats at Pro Football Reference

James Olevia Mungro II (born February 13, 1978) is an American former professional football running back and fullback. Mungro played college football for the Syracuse Orange. Mungro entered the league in 2002 as an undrafted free agent signed by the Detroit Lions. After his release by the Lions before the 2002 regular season began, Mungro signed with the Indianapolis Colts, where he played from 2002 to 2006 and won Super Bowl XLI.

== Early life and education ==
Mungro attended East Stroudsburg South High School in East Stroudsburg, Pennsylvania. He was Parade and Street and Smith's All-America grid performer. He was also Pennsylvania Player-of-the-Year as a junior and all-state selection in his final two seasons. He rushed for 2,541 yards and 34 touchdowns as senior. He set the Pennsylvania state record after rushing for 8,432 yards and totaling 9,513 all-purpose yards during his career. Overall, he set 48 team records during his high school career and was three-time team MVP. He now resides in Camillus, New York with his wife Jessica.

=== College career ===
Mungro was a four-year letterman who totaled 529–2, 869, 29 touchdowns rushing for the Syracuse University Orangemen. He had his best year as a senior with 1,170, 14 touchdowns rushing. His yardage total ranked as third-best seasonal performance in school history. Named Insight.com Bowl Offensive Player of the Game after rushing for 19–112 in a win over Kansas State. He was 115–797, 7 touchdowns as junior in 10 games. His seasonal 6.9 rushing average ranked him third-best in school history. Mungro started one of twelve games as a sophomore with 116–537, 5 touchdowns rushing. He was named Music City Bowl MVP after rushing 12–162, 2 touchdowns against the University of Kentucky, including a career-long 86-yard touchdown burst. He played in eight games as a freshman and was 50-365, 3 touchdowns rushing. Mungro graduated with a major in physical education.

== NFL career ==
Undrafted, Mungro was signed by the Detroit Lions in 2002 but was cut at the end of training camp that year. The Indianapolis Colts signed him immediately, and he became a backup to Edgerrin James. He rushed for eight touchdowns filling in for James that year, who was oft-injured. He had 114 yards in his first start.

In 2003, Mungro was a back-up running back in seven outings for Colts before spending his final four games on injured reserve with a toe injury. His three touchdown rushes against the Tampa Bay Buccaneers helped the club erase a 35–14 deficit with four minutes remaining in an eventual 38–35 overtime win.

In 2004, he caught two of Peyton Manning's record-breaking 49 touchdown passes in a season, including the record-tying 48th touchdown pass against the San Diego Chargers.

On the Colts official website, Tony Dungy quoted "He did a lot for us, he was our third back and a very good runner. He was a guy who could go in and play tailback and win games for us. He was our fullback in short-yardage and goal-line situations and he was a very good special teams player." This was quoted after James Mungro tore his ACL.

In 2006, he won a Super Bowl ring after winning Super Bowl XLI with the Colts.

Mungro was not re-signed by the Colts and was not on the roster for any part of the 2007–08 season.

According to Colts GM Bill Polian during an interview live on the NFL Network during the 6th Round of the 2008 NFL draft, Mungro had retired from the NFL due to his injury.
