= Notre Dame Junior/Senior High School =

Location
- 60 Spangenburg Avenue; East Stroudsburg, (Monroe County), Pennsylvania 18301; United States; 41°0′16.5″N 75°10′8″W

Information
- Type: Private, Coeducational
- Mottoes: We are ND! Over Fifty Years of Living the Gospel through Education, Worship, and Service
- Religious affiliation: Roman Catholic
- Established: 1967
- School district: Diocese of Scranton Catholic School System
- Oversight: Diocese of Scranton
- Superintendent: Mrs. Kristen Donohue
- Principal: Mr. Bryan Scotton
- Grades: 7-12
- Average class size: 40-60
- Colors: Green and Gold
- Mascot: Spartan
- Team name: Spartans
- Accreditation: Middle States Association of Colleges and Schools
- Athletic Director: Mr. Roger Barren
- Website: http://www.ndhigh.org
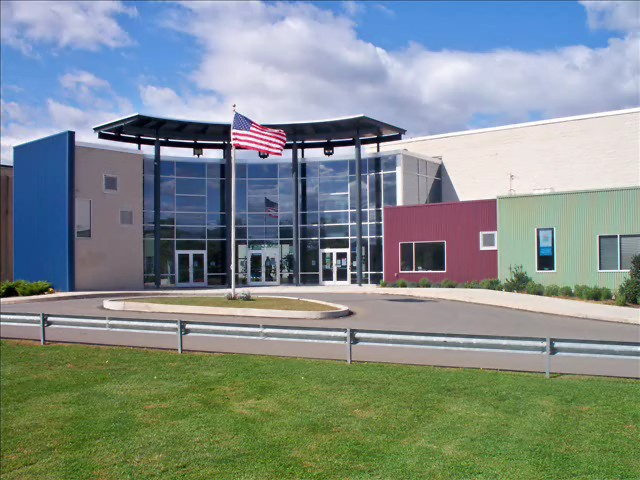

Notre Dame Junior/Senior High School is a private, Roman Catholic high school in East Stroudsburg, Pennsylvania, United States. It is located in the Roman Catholic Diocese of Scranton.

== Background ==
Notre Dame was established in 1967. It primarily serves residents in Monroe County, Pennsylvania and surrounding counties in Pennsylvania, New York, and New Jersey.
