= East Stroudsburg High School North =

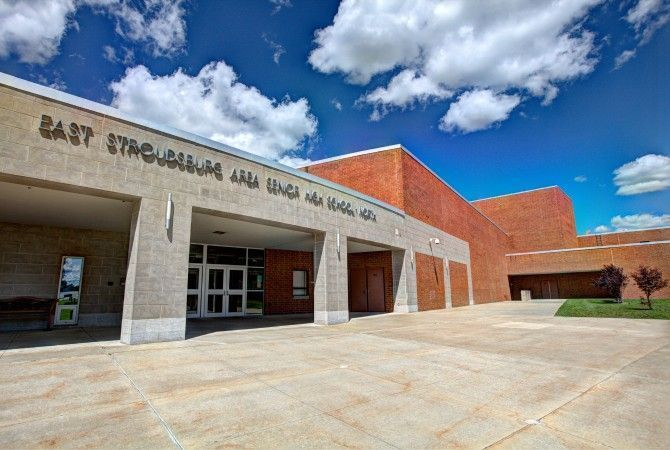
- Photo of the school, located in Dingmans Ferry, Pennsylvania

Location
- 279 Timberwolf Drive; Dingmans Ferry, Pike County, Pennsylvania; United States; 41.17674°N 75.01898°W

Information
- Type: Public high school
- Established: 2000; 26 years ago
- NCES School ID: 420867000518
- Principal: Ray Lenhart
- Staff: 76.75 (on an FTE basis)
- Enrollment: 922 (2023–2024)
- Student to teacher ratio: 12.01
- Colors: Blue, silver, black
- Athletics conference: Eastern Pennsylvania Conference
- Mascot: "Timba", the Timberwolf
- Website: https://north.esasd.net/

East Stroudsburg Senior High School North is a midsized, public high school located in Dingmans Ferry in Pike County, Pennsylvania. It is one of two high schools operated by the East Stroudsburg Area School District.

As of the 2023–24 school year, the school had an enrollment of 922 students, according to National Center for Education Statistics data.

== Departments and programs ==
=== Music ===
Since 2000, East Stroudsburg High School North has had a concert choir open to all students, a select choir, courses in music fundamentals and composition, and piano class, and have participated in adjudications and select programs at the regional and state levels. There is also the concert band, jazz band, color guard, and other instrumental ensembles open to students by audition. Throughout the school year, the vocal and instrumental music programs host several concerts open to the community. The music classrooms are located on the first floor of the building.

=== Science ===
The Science Department offers general science and biology courses for all 9th and 10th graders, respectively, at the applied, college prep, and honors levels. After completing Biology I, students can enroll in environmental science, anatomy and physiology, chemistry, or physics courses. Advanced Placement (AP) courses in biology, chemistry, and physics are available for those students who qualify. Prior to 2005, a second-semester chemistry course and a course in human sexuality were offered in the Science Department. For several years, a forensics course and an earth science course, "General Science II," were offered.

The science labs are housed on the middle wing, on both the first and second floors.

=== Social Studies ===
When the school first opened, all students were required to complete three years of social studies courses. These included World Cultures I, World Cultures/US History II, and US History III. These courses were offered at the honors, academic (later College Prep) and applied levels. Additionally, students could enroll in various elective courses offered through the Social Studies Department, including Current World Issues, Psychology, and Sociology. An Advanced Placement (AP) level course in US History was also offered for qualified students.

Beginning with the class of 2008, students are now required to complete four years of social studies courses. The new course sequence included World Studies I (grade 9), World Studies II (grade 10), American Studies I (grade 11), and American Studies II (grade 12).

As of 2022, ninth-grade students are required to complete a course in World Civilizations. Tenth-grade students are required to take a course in Civics. Eleventh-grade students are required to take American History, and twelfth-grade students are required to take a course in Global Citizenship. Courses are offered at the honors, College Prep, and Applied levels. Additionally, Advanced Placement (AP) courses in U.S. Government (grade 10), U.S. History I (grade 11), and U.S. History II (grade 12) are also offered for those students who qualify. As electives, students can enroll in Multicultural Perspectives on U.S. History, Psychology, Sociology, Current World Issues, and U.S. Government and Politics.

The Social Studies Department is housed on the first floor of the building.

=== Technology education ===
Students at East Stroudsburg High School North can choose between courses in Architectural Drawing, Graphic Technology, Electronics, Wood Technology, TV and Video Production, Energy/Power, and Multimedia. The Technology Education Department is housed on the first floor of the building.

== Athletics ==
East Stroudsburg North competes athletically in the Eastern Pennsylvania Conference (EPC) in the District XI division of the Pennsylvania Interscholastic Athletic Association, one of the premier high school athletic divisions in the nation. East Stroudsburg North competes in the Monroe Division of the EPC, along with five other schools: East Stroudsburg High School South, Pocono Mountain East High School, Pocono Mountain West High School, Pleasant Valley High School, and Stroudsburg High School.

Boys

- Baseball - AAAA
- Basketball- AAAA
- Cross country - AAA
- Football - AAAA
- Golf - AAA
- Rifle - AAAA
- Soccer - AAA
- Swimming and diving - AAA
- Tennis - AAA
- Track and field - AAA
- Wrestling - AAA

Girls

- Basketball - AAAA
- Cheer - AAAA
- Cross country - AAA
- Field hockey - AAA
- Golf - AAA
- Rifle - AAAA
- Soccer (Fall) - AAA
- Softball - AAA
- Swimming and diving - AAA
- Tennis - AAA
- Track and field - AAA
- Volleyball - AAA

According to the PIAA directory July 2013

== Musicals ==
East Stroudsburg North stages an annual musical the first week of April. To date, the musicals they have staged include:

- 2001: Godspell
- 2002: Footloose
- 2003: Chicago
- 2004: The Wizard of Oz
- 2005: Seussical the Musical
- 2006: Joseph and the Amazing Technicolor Dreamcoat
- 2007: The Sound of Music
- 2008: The Music Man
- 2009: The Wiz
- 2010: Grease
- 2011: Guys and Dolls
- 2012: Once on This Island
- 2013: Ragtime
- 2014: Aida
- 2015: Godspell
- 2016: Hairspray
- 2017: In the Heights
- 2018: Seussical the Musical
- 2019: The Wiz
- 2020: (none due to COVID-19 pandemic)
- 2021: (none due to COVID-19 pandemic)
- 2022: Once on This Island
- 2023: Godspell
- 2024: Alice By Heart
- 2025: Seussical the Musical
- 2026: Charlie and the Chocolate Factory (musical)

== Student media ==
=== Student broadcasting ===
Title	Years active
"North News"	2002-2019
"North Drive Live"	2019–Present

=== Student newspaper ===
Title	Years in Publication
Timberwolves Chronicle	2000-2002
The Howl	2002-2003
The Wolf Pack Chronicle	2003-2012
”Timberwolf Times”	2025-Present

== History ==
East Stroudsburg Area Senior High School North opened its doors on August 28, 2000. The school was built in an effort to address population growth in the northern side of the East Stroudsburg Area School District. The building, which is shared with the Lehman Intermediate School, took two years to construct.

=== Mascot ===
During the construction of the North campus, the East Stroudsburg Area School District Board of Directors were originally going to make North's mascot a musketeer, keeping a purple and white color scheme, similar to the newly named East Stroudsburg High School South. Yet, once word had spread to the students of East Stroudsburg South, the students wanted the new school to have more unique colors and a more distinct mascot, and requested the School Board to change their original plans. The School Board agreed, and a poll was sent to the upperclassmen with several options. In early 2000, the Board approved the student-selected colors of carolina blue, black, and silver, with the timberwolf as the mascot.

=== Principals ===
Principal	Tenure
Richard Carty	2000-2005
Patricia Mulroy	2005-2007
Stuart Tripler	Spring 2007 (Acting Principal)
Stephen Zall	2007-2017
Benjamin Brenneman	2017–2025
Ray Lenhart	2025–present

=== Athletic Directors ===
Director	Tenure
P. William David	2000-2003
Christopher Rossi	2003-2004 (Interim Co-Director)
Charles Dailey	2003–2026
Erik Buksa	2026-Present

== Notable alumni ==
- Alexis Cohen, American Idol contestant
- Chiddy Bang, American rapper
