= Freedom High School =

Freedom High School may refer to:

- Freedom High School (Oakley, California) in Oakley, California
- Freedom High School (Turlock, California) in Turlock, California
- Freedom High School (Orlando, Florida) in Orlando, Florida
- Freedom High School (Tampa, Florida) in Tampa, Florida
- Freedom High School (New Mexico) in Albuquerque, New Mexico
- Freedom High School (North Carolina) in Morganton, North Carolina
- Freedom High School (Oklahoma) in Freedom, Oklahoma
- Freedom High School (Bethlehem, Pennsylvania) in Bethlehem, Pennsylvania
- Freedom Area Senior High School, in Freedom, Pennsylvania
- Freedom High School (Loudoun County, Virginia) in South Riding, Virginia
- Freedom High School (Woodbridge, Virginia) in Woodbridge, Virginia
- Freedom High School (Wisconsin) in Freedom, Outagamie County, Wisconsin

Schools with similar names include:

- Fannie Lou Hamer Freedom High School in Bronx, New York, New York
