= Lehighton Area School District =

School district in Pennsylvania

Address
- 1000 Union Street Lehighton, Carbon County, Pennsylvania, 18235; United States

District information
- Type: Public
- Budget: 14.98
- NCES District ID: 4213500

Students and staff
- Students: 2,187 (2021-22)
- Faculty: 146.00 (FTE)

Other information
- Website: https://www.lehighton.org/

The Lehighton Area School District is school district located just north of the Blue Mountain range the Lehigh River in Carbon County, in the Lehigh Valley region of eastern Pennsylvania.

The district is composed of four communities which are served by the Lehighton Area School District over a sixty-seven-square-mile area. East Penn Township is to the south of the borough of Lehighton, Mahoning Township is to the west along PA Route 443, and Franklin Township is located on the east side of the Lehigh River.

The school district has one elementary school, which includes full-day kindergarten and houses grades one through five, one middle school that serves grades six through eight. The high school facility was built in 1993. As of the 2021-22 school year, the school district had 2,187 pupils, according to the National Center for Education Statistics.

== Notable alumni ==
- Franz Kline, abstract expressionist painter
- Denny Seiwell, drummer, Paul McCartney and Wings
