= East Stroudsburg, Pennsylvania =

Borough in Pennsylvania, US

- Borough
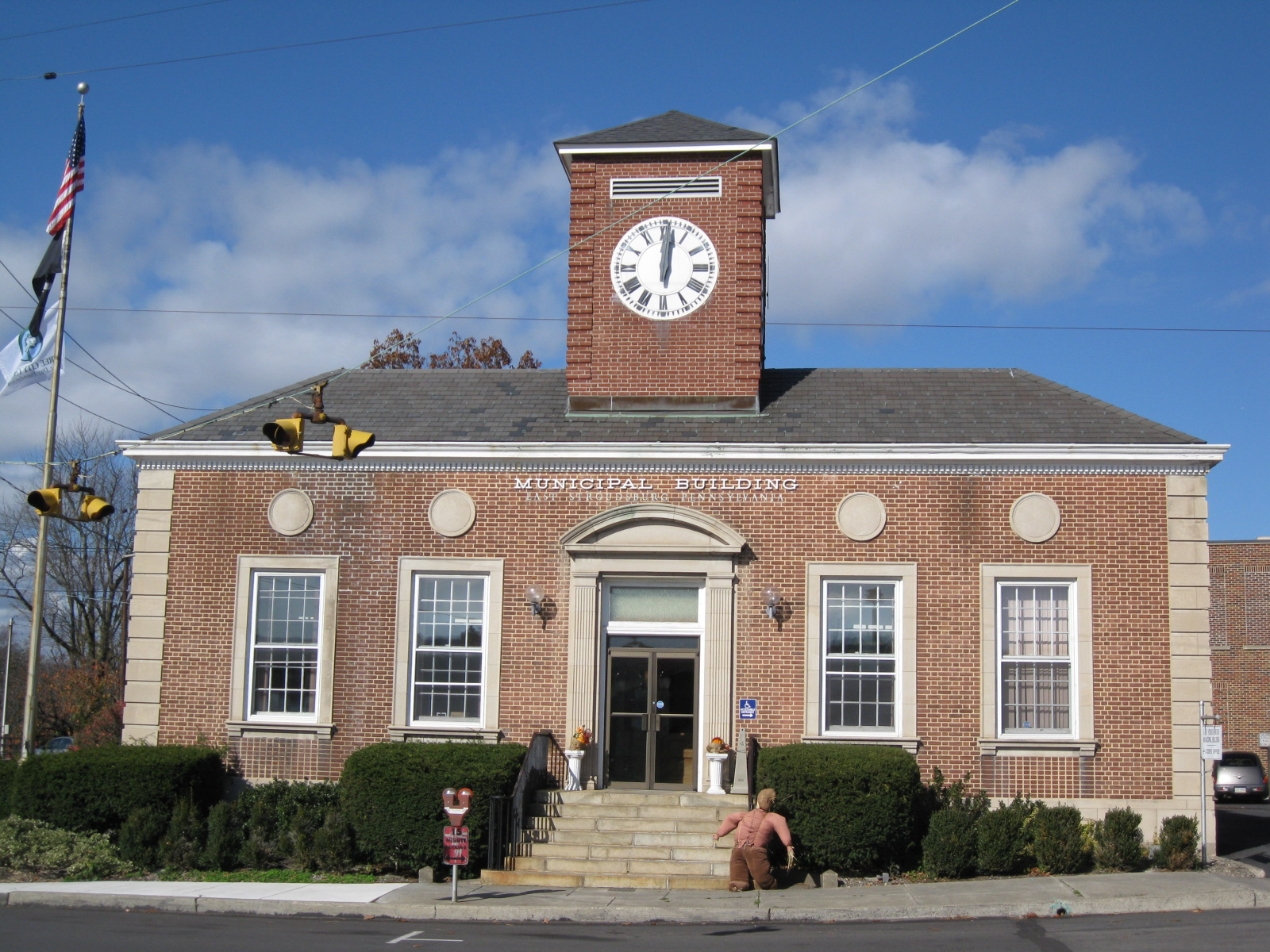
- East Stroudsburg's borough hall

- Seal

- Location of East Stroudsburg in Monroe County, Pennsylvania

- Location of East Stroudsburg in Pennsylvania East Stroudsburg (the United States)
- Coordinates: 41°00′05″N 75°10′48″W
- Country: United States
- State: Pennsylvania
- County: Monroe
- Founded: 1738

Area
  - Borough: 2.86 sq mi (7.41 km^{2})
  - Land: 2.85 sq mi (7.37 km^{2})
  - Water: 0.015 sq mi (0.04 km^{2})
- Elevation: 466 ft (142 m)

Population (2020)
  - Borough: 9,669
  - Density: 3,399.6/sq mi (1,312.58/km^{2})
  - Metro: 176,567 μSA
- Time zone: UTC-5 (EST)
  - Summer (DST): UTC-4 (EDT)
- ZIP Codes: 18301-18302
- Area code: 570
- FIPS code: 42-21872
- Website: eaststroudsburgboro.org

East Stroudsburg is a borough in Monroe County, Pennsylvania, and part of the Pocono Mountains region of the state. Originally known as Dansbury, East Stroudsburg was renamed for geographic reasons when the Delaware, Lackawanna, and Western Railroad opened a station in East Stroudsburg. Despite its name being derivative of its bordering borough, Stroudsburg, it has almost twice the population.

East Stroudsburg is the largest municipality in Monroe County and in the East Stroudsburg, PA Micropolitan Statistical Area.

As of the 2020 census, the population of East Stroudsburg was 9,847.

East Stroudsburg is located 42 miles (68 km) northeast of Allentown, 102 miles (164 km) north of Philadelphia, and 75 miles (121 km) west of New York City.

== History ==
In 1737, present-day East Stroudsburg was settled by Daniel Brodhead, a judge from Marbletown, New York, who acquired a 1,000-acre lot of land on and around where Lehigh Valley Hospital–Pocono Hospital currently stands at 206 E. Brown Street in what then was Bucks County and now is Monroe County along the east bank of Brodhead Creek, then known as the Analomink River. The property was known as Dansbury Manor. Moravian missionaries, residing in Bethlehem to the town's south, often traveled through Danbury Manor on the way to Dutchess County, New York and other northern locations.

On December 11, 1755, six months after Brodhead's death, Danbury Manor was attacked by approximately 200 Native Americans. Brodhead's five sons and daughter each took up arms, and fired at the attackers. While each of the Brodhead children were able to save the lives, the Native American attackers destroyed Danbury Manor.

In 1856, the Delaware, Lackawanna and Western Railroad was built through present-day East Stroudsburg, which greatly increased the town's population and economic vibrancy. In the late 19th century and early 20th century, East Stroudsburg became one of several eastern Pennsylvania centers for manufacturing and commerce.

The East Stroudsburg Armory and East Stroudsburg station, both in East Stroudsburg, are listed on the National Register of Historic Places.

== Geography ==
East Stroudsburg is located at 41°0′5″N 75°10′48″W (41.001442, -75.180111). According to the U.S. Census Bureau, the borough has a total area of 2.9 square miles (7.5 km^{2}), all land. When traveling west on Interstate 80, East Stroudsburg is the second town from the New Jersey-Pennsylvania border, on Exit 308.

== Demographics ==
Historical population
| Census | Pop. | Note | %± |
|---|---|---|---|
| 1880 | 1,162 | | — |
| 1890 | 1,819 | | 56.5% |
| 1900 | 2,648 | | 45.6% |
| 1910 | 3,330 | | 25.8% |
| 1920 | 4,855 | | 45.8% |
| 1930 | 6,099 | | 25.6% |
| 1940 | 6,404 | | 5.0% |
| 1950 | 7,274 | | 13.6% |
| 1960 | 7,674 | | 5.5% |
| 1970 | 7,894 | | 2.9% |
| 1980 | 8,039 | | 1.8% |
| 1990 | 8,781 | | 9.2% |
| 2000 | 9,888 | | 12.6% |
| 2010 | 11,922 | | 20.6% |
| 2020 | 9,669 | | −18.9% |
| 2021 (est.) | 9,913 | ▲ | 2.5% |

According to the American Community Survey conducted in 2009, the racial composition of East Stroudsburg was:

White: 64.35% Black or African American: 21.26% Two or more races: 6.57% Other race: 4.15% Asian: 3.46% Native American: 0.13% Native Hawaiian or Pacific Islander: 0.09% As of the census of 2010, there were 11,922 people, 3,145 households, and 1,855 families residing in the borough. The population density was 3,445.6 people per square mile (1,330.4 people/km^{2}). There were 3,331 housing units at an average density of 1,160.7 per square mile (448.1/km^{2}).

There were 3,331 households, out of which 27.8% had children under the age of 18 living with them, 41.9% were married couples living together, 12.5% had a female householder with no husband present, and 41.0% were non-families. 31.1% of all households were made up of individuals, and 13.5% had someone living alone who was 65 years of age or older. The average household size was 2.42 and the average family size was 3.04.

In the borough the population was spread out, with 18.0% under the age of 18, 30.3% from 18 to 24, 22.0% from 25 to 44, 16.1% from 45 to 64, and 13.5% who were 65 years of age or older. The median age was 26 years. For every 100 females there were 86.0 males. For every 100 females age 18 and over, there were 81.7 males.

The median income for a household in the borough was $36,601, and the median income for a family was $44,044. Males had a median income of $34,764 versus $21,742 for females. The per capita income for the borough was $14,909. About 9.1% of families and 15.2% of the population were below the poverty line, including 17.7% of those under age 18 and 11.0% of those age 65 or over.

United States presidential election results for East Stroudsburg, Pennsylvania
| Year | Republican | | Democratic | | Third party(ies) | |
| Year | No. | % | No. | % | No. | % |
|---|---|---|---|---|---|---|
| 2024 | 1,533 | 40.35% | 2,227 | 58.62% | 39 | 1.03% |
| 2020 | 1,247 | 35.64% | 2,196 | 62.76% | 56 | 1.60% |
| 2016 | 1,271 | 36.06% | 2,115 | 60.00% | 139 | 3.94% |
| 2012 | 1,059 | 33.30% | 2,070 | 65.09% | 51 | 1.60% |
| 2008 | 1,407 | 33.62% | 2,748 | 65.66% | 30 | 0.72% |
| 2004 | 1,345 | 42.77% | 1,781 | 56.63% | 19 | 0.60% |
| 2000 | 1,116 | 44.15% | 1,327 | 52.49% | 85 | 3.36% |

== Education ==
=== Primary public education ===
East Stroudsburg Area School District

- East Stroudsburg High School North
- East Stroudsburg High School South

=== Primary private education ===
- Notre Dame High School

=== Colleges and universities ===
- East Stroudsburg University of Pennsylvania

== Sports ==
Pocono Snow was an American soccer team based in East Stroudsburg, Pennsylvania, United States. Founded in 2008, the team plays in National Premier Soccer League, a national amateur league at the fourth tier of the American Soccer Pyramid, in the Eastern Keystone Division. The team plays its home games at Eiler-Martin Stadium on the campus of East Stroudsburg University, where they have played since 2009. The team's colors are orange, blue, and white. East Stroudsburg University's 22 varsity teams compete in Division II of the NCAA as the East Stroudsburg University Warriors.

== Health system ==
Lehigh Valley Hospital-Pocono is a member of the Lehigh Valley Health Network that manages five healthcare subsidiaries to collectively provide services to residents and visitors of Monroe County and surrounding counties in Pennsylvania and New Jersey. Pocono Medical Center began as General Hospital, and was founded in East Stroudsburg on Courtland Street in 1915; it became Lehigh Valley Hospital-Pocono in 2017.

== Transportation ==
=== Roads and highways ===
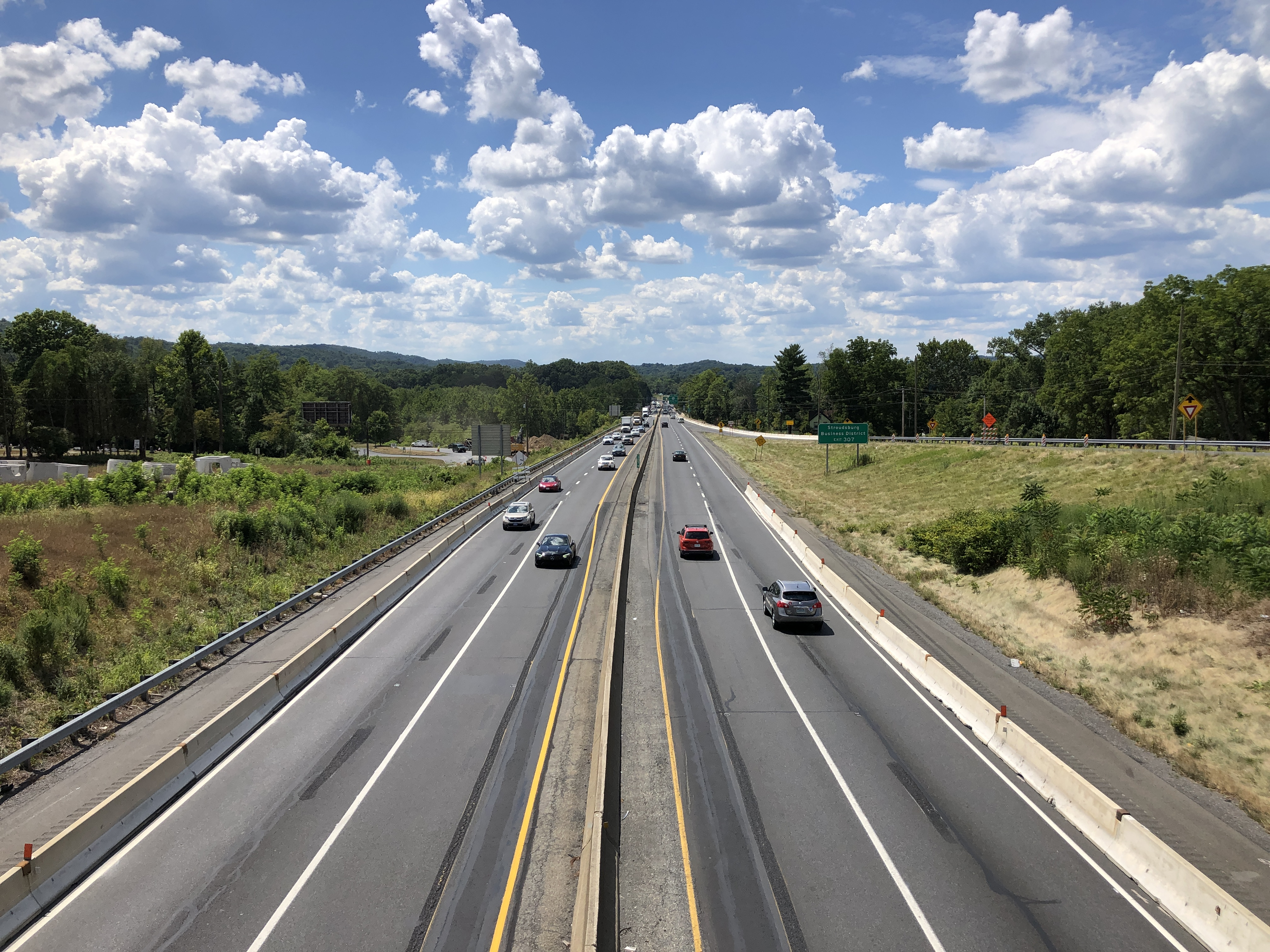
I-80 westbound and US 209 southbound in East Stroudsburg

As of 2017, there were 30.37 miles (48.88 km) of public roads in East Stroudsburg, of which 6.67 miles (10.73 km) were maintained by the Pennsylvania Department of Transportation (PennDOT) and 23.70 miles (38.14 km) were maintained by the borough.

Interstate 80 and U.S. Route 209 are the most prominent highways serving East Stroudsburg. They traverse the borough concurrently via the Keystone Shortway along a southwest–northeast alignment across the southern portion of the borough. U.S. Route 209 Business follows a north–south alignment through the center of the borough. Pennsylvania Route 447 follows a southeast–northwest alignment across the northern corner of the borough.

=== Airport ===
Stroudsburg-Pocono Airport is located near East Stroudsburg, in Smithfield Township, Monroe County, Pennsylvania. Stroudsburg-Pocono Airport serves East Stroudsburg and Monroe County and is owned by Robert Strenz. The paved runway extends for 3087 feet. The facility is at an elevation of 480 feet. The airport offers activities such as the Sky's the Limit Skydiving Center and a golf driving range.

=== Transit ===
The Monroe County Transit Authority, sometimes known as the Pocono Pony, serves Monroe County with five bus routes. Two of those routes, the Red and Yellow routes, serve East Stroudsburg. The Red route connects the central business district with adjacent Stroudsburg and Pocono Medical Center. The Yellow Route serves the Northern and Eastern portions of the borough, connecting them with the Stroud Mall, and the Marshall's Creek, PA area.

=== Railway ===
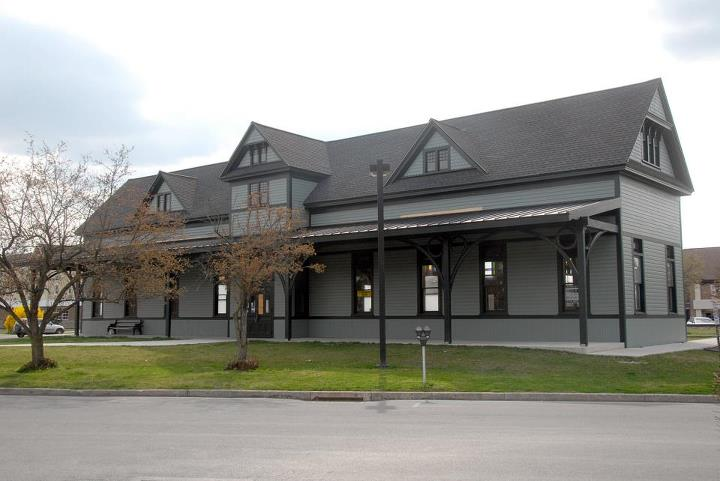
East Stroudsburg station

East Stroudsburg station formerly served East Stroudsburg, but the last Erie Lackawanna Railway passenger train, the Lake Cities, stopped there on January 6, 1970. There are plans for the New Jersey Transit to run through and reopen this station. Most of this project however, is currently not funded. Only the MOS (Minimum Operable Segment) of the project is being built so far, from where the Eastern end of the Lackawanna Cut-Off separates from the former Lackawanna RR main line at Port Morris Jct. to Andover, New Jersey.

The track eastward from East Stroudsburg to Slateford Junction is still in service and used by the Delaware-Lackawanna Railroad three times a week both to service a paper plant at Minisink Hills and interchange freight with Norfolk Southern at Slateford Jct. Heading west from East Stroudsburg, the former Delaware, Lackawanna and Western (Lackawanna) double-track main line still has a usable single track through to Scranton. The Delaware Lackawanna Railroad provides local freight service over this segment, and passenger excursions from Steamtown, USA (located in Scranton) are run several times a year to East Stroudsburg and to the Delaware Water Gap.

==== Pennsylvania Northeast Regional Railroad Authority ====
Rail transportation plays an important part in the history of the borough and continues to have an impact today. The Pennsylvania Northeast Regional Railroad Authority is a bi-county creation of both Lackawanna County and Monroe County to oversee the use of common rail freight lines in northeastern Pennsylvania, including one formerly owned by Conrail running from Scranton, through East Stroudsburg towards New Jersey, and the New York City market, called the Pocono Mainline.

==== Lackawanna Cut-Off Restoration Project ====
There is an effort to re-establish rail passenger service via New Jersey Transit between Scranton and Hoboken, New Jersey by way of the Lackawanna Cut-Off, with connecting service into Manhattan. The first physical work of this project began in 2011. Grants have been committed to bridge restoration to ensure the restoration of train movement.

== Media ==
=== Print ===
The Pocono Record is the newspaper for Monroe County. Its coverage area centers on Stroudsburg and East Stroudsburg and includes the area's many small communities. The newspaper also covers parts of Pike, Lackawanna, Wayne and Carbon counties as well as areas of western New Jersey.

=== Radio ===
WESS at (90.3 FM) broadcasts from the Borough of East Stroudsburg as a service of East Stroudsburg University. Students and Faculty of the university provide programing often, and the station rebroadcasts BBC World Service when live DJs are not available.

WSBG (93.5 FM) is a radio station broadcasting a soft adult contemporary format. Licensed to Stroudsburg, the station serves the Greater Stroudsburg area. Currently owned by iHeart Radio.

WRTI as repeated by station WRTY (91.1 FM) from Jackson Township – Temple University News, Jazz, and NPR.

WXPJ at (91.9 FM) as broadcast from Hackettstown, New Jersey, from Centenary College – independent programing and music, NPR.

WHCY at (106.3 FM) is a radio station broadcasting a Contemporary Hit Radio format. It is owned by iHeart Radio.

WKRF at 107.9 FM is a radio station simulcasting a Contemporary Hit Radio format from WKRZ-FM (98.5-Freeland/Wilkes-Barre/Scranton).

== Notable people ==
- Hugh Brannum, Vocalist with the Fred Waring Band, later career as Mr. Green Jeans on Captain Kangaroo kids show
- Charlie Brenneman, professional UFC MMA fighter known as "The Spaniard"

(From Hollidaysburg PA before moving to New Jersey near East Stroudsburg according to theycamefrompa.com)

- Keir Dillon, professional snowboarder
- Bob Dorough, jazz pianist and composer of many famous Schoolhouse Rock! songs
- Francis Dunnery, musician, singer-songwriter and record producer
- James Geoffrey Franklin, head coach, Penn State Nittany Lions football
- Norman J. Kansfield, former President of New Brunswick Theological Seminary
- Lenny Kaye, guitarist, member of Patti Smith Group
- Nellie McKay, singer-songwriter, actor, former stand-up comedian
- James Mungro, retired NFL player, Indianapolis Colts
- Nastasia Scott, model
- Shelby Starner, singer-songwriter and musician
- Jimmy Terwilliger, football's 2005 Harlon Hill Trophy winner
- Phil Woods, jazz musician and composer, co-founder of famous annual Celebration of the Arts Festival
- Brian Xanders, executive with NFL's Los Angeles Rams, Denver Broncos

== Historical sites ==
- East Stroudsburg Railroad Station (Date Listed: June 27, 1980) is a restored train station built in 1864 by the Delaware, Lackawanna and Western Railroad. The station served as the local stop for both East Stroudsburg and Stroudsburg, Pennsylvania. The depot, known locally as the Dansbury Depot for the original town name of Dansbury for Daniel Brodhead, is located at 5 S. Kistler St Street in downtown East Stroudsburg. Passenger service ended on January 6, 1970, with the discontinuance of the Hoboken-Chicago Lake Cities: the last long-distance passenger train operated by DL&W successor Erie Lackawanna. The depot houses historical information and is used for a community center. Music on Mondays at Dansbury Depot and various festivals are held throughout the year. It was restored with community grants from the R. Dale and Frances Hughes Foundation, The East Stroudsburg Savings Foundation, and a Monroe County Hotel Tax Grant.
- East Stroudsburg Armory (Date Listed: May 9, 1991) is located on Washington Street in downtown East Stroudsburg.
- Zion Lutheran Church (Date Listed: November 9, 1972) is a historic church built in 1851 in eastern East Stroudsburg.

== Climate ==
According to the Trewartha climate classification system, East Stroudsburg has a Temperate Continental climate with hot summers, cold winters and year-around precipitation (Dcao). Dcao climates are characterized by at least one month having an average mean temperature ≤ 32.0 °F (0 °C), four to seven months with an average mean temperature ≥ 50.0 °F (10 °C), at least one month with an average mean temperature ≥ 72.0 °F (22 °C) and no significant precipitation difference between seasons. Although most summer days are slightly humid in East Stroudsburg, episodes of heat and high humidity can occur with heat index values > 102 °F (39 °C). Since 1981, the highest air temperature has been 100.3 °F (38 °C) on July 22, 2011, and the highest daily average mean dew point has been 72.7 °F (23 °C) on August 1, 2006. July is the peak month for thunderstorm activity, which correlates with the average warmest month of the year. The average wettest month is September which correlates with tropical storm remnants during the peak month of the Atlantic hurricane season. Since 1981, the wettest calendar day has been 6.36 inches (162 mm) on October 8, 2005. During the winter months, the plant hardiness zone is 6a, with an average annual extreme minimum air temperature of −5.4 °F (−21 °C). Since 1981, the coldest air temperature has been −18.0 °F (−28 °C) on January 21, 1994. Episodes of extreme cold and wind can occur with wind chill values < −17 °F (−27 °C). The average snowiest month is January, which correlates with the average coldest month of the year. Ice storms and large snowstorms depositing ≥ 12 inches (30 cm) of snow occur once every couple of years, particularly during nor’easters from December through February.

Climate data for East Stroudsburg, Pennsylvania (1991–2020 normals, extremes 1911–present)
| Month | Jan | Feb | Mar | Apr | May | Jun | Jul | Aug | Sep | Oct | Nov | Dec | Year |
|---|---|---|---|---|---|---|---|---|---|---|---|---|---|
| Record high °F (°C) | 72 (22) | 75 (24) | 87 (31) | 96 (36) | 97 (36) | 100 (38) | 104 (40) | 103 (39) | 106 (41) | 95 (35) | 86 (30) | 72 (22) | 106 (41) |
| Mean daily maximum °F (°C) | 35.8 (2.1) | 39.3 (4.1) | 48.2 (9.0) | 61.9 (16.6) | 72.1 (22.3) | 79.6 (26.4) | 84.3 (29.1) | 82.3 (27.9) | 74.9 (23.8) | 63.0 (17.2) | 51.0 (10.6) | 40.4 (4.7) | 61.1 (16.2) |
| Daily mean °F (°C) | 27.5 (−2.5) | 30.0 (−1.1) | 38.0 (3.3) | 49.5 (9.7) | 59.8 (15.4) | 67.8 (19.9) | 72.7 (22.6) | 70.7 (21.5) | 63.6 (17.6) | 51.7 (10.9) | 41.2 (5.1) | 32.5 (0.3) | 50.4 (10.2) |
| Mean daily minimum °F (°C) | 19.3 (−7.1) | 20.6 (−6.3) | 27.9 (−2.3) | 37.2 (2.9) | 47.4 (8.6) | 56.1 (13.4) | 61.0 (16.1) | 59.2 (15.1) | 52.3 (11.3) | 40.4 (4.7) | 31.5 (−0.3) | 24.5 (−4.2) | 39.8 (4.3) |
| Record low °F (°C) | −35 (−37) | −21 (−29) | −11 (−24) | 10 (−12) | 24 (−4) | 32 (0) | 36 (2) | 32 (0) | 20 (−7) | 14 (−10) | 2 (−17) | −14 (−26) | −35 (−37) |
| Average precipitation inches (mm) | 3.78 (96) | 3.12 (79) | 4.04 (103) | 4.31 (109) | 4.41 (112) | 5.50 (140) | 4.71 (120) | 4.83 (123) | 5.30 (135) | 5.24 (133) | 3.89 (99) | 4.42 (112) | 53.55 (1,360) |
| Average snowfall inches (cm) | 11.3 (29) | 10.3 (26) | 9.5 (24) | 0.9 (2.3) | 0.0 (0.0) | 0.0 (0.0) | 0.0 (0.0) | 0.0 (0.0) | 0.0 (0.0) | 0.1 (0.25) | 1.5 (3.8) | 8.0 (20) | 41.6 (106) |
| Average precipitation days (≥ 0.01 in) | 12.7 | 11.2 | 11.4 | 12.4 | 13.9 | 12.0 | 12.3 | 11.7 | 9.5 | 12.0 | 10.9 | 12.3 | 142.3 |
| Average snowy days (≥ 0.1 in) | 7.4 | 6.1 | 4.3 | 0.7 | 0.0 | 0.0 | 0.0 | 0.0 | 0.0 | 0.1 | 1.0 | 4.9 | 24.5 |
Source: NOAA

== Ecology ==
According to the A. W. Kuchler U.S. potential natural vegetation types, East Stroudsburg would have a dominant vegetation type of Appalachian Oak (104) with a dominant vegetation form of Eastern Hardwood Forest (25). The peak spring bloom typically occurs in late-April and peak fall color usually occurs in mid-October. The plant hardiness zone was 6a until 2012 with an average annual extreme minimum air temperature of −5.4 °F (−21 °C). In 2023, the revised map showed it is now in zone 6b.
