= Eastern Pennsylvania Conference =

High school sports conference

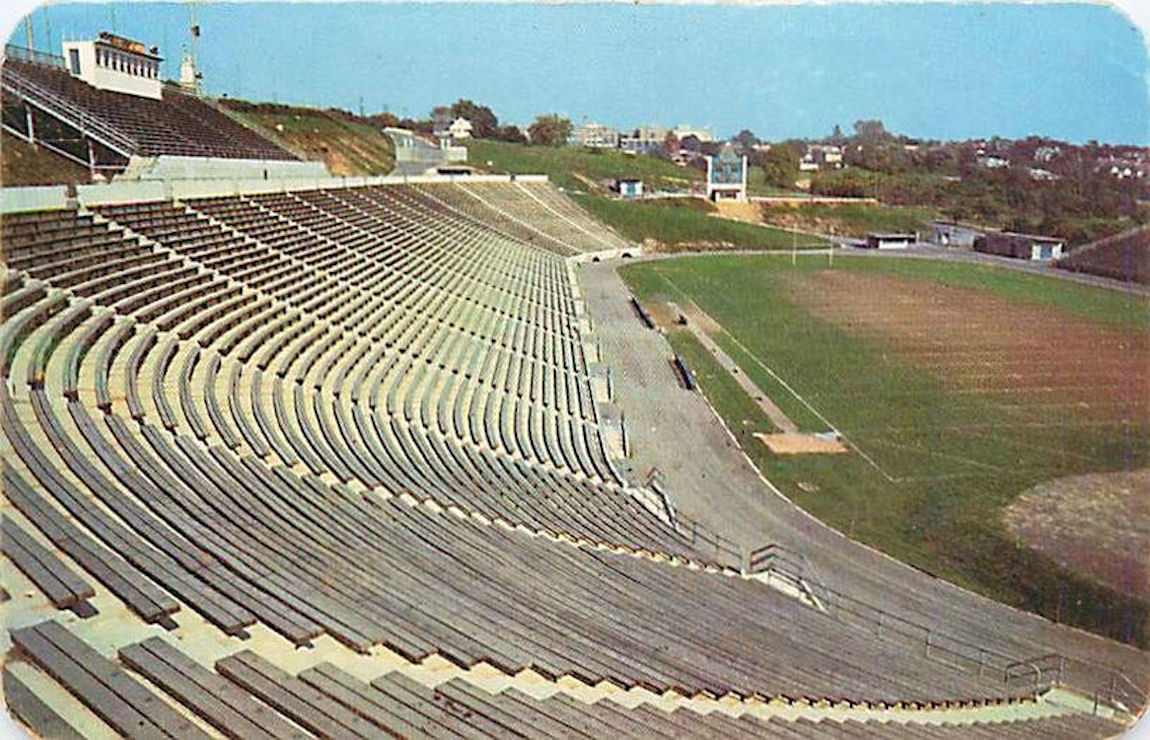
J. Birney Crum Stadium in Allentown, a 15,000-capacity stadium, is the largest high school football stadium in the Mid-Atlantic region of the nation and the home field for all three Allentown-based Eastern Pennsylvania Conference high school football teams, Allen, Central Catholic, and Dieruff high schools.

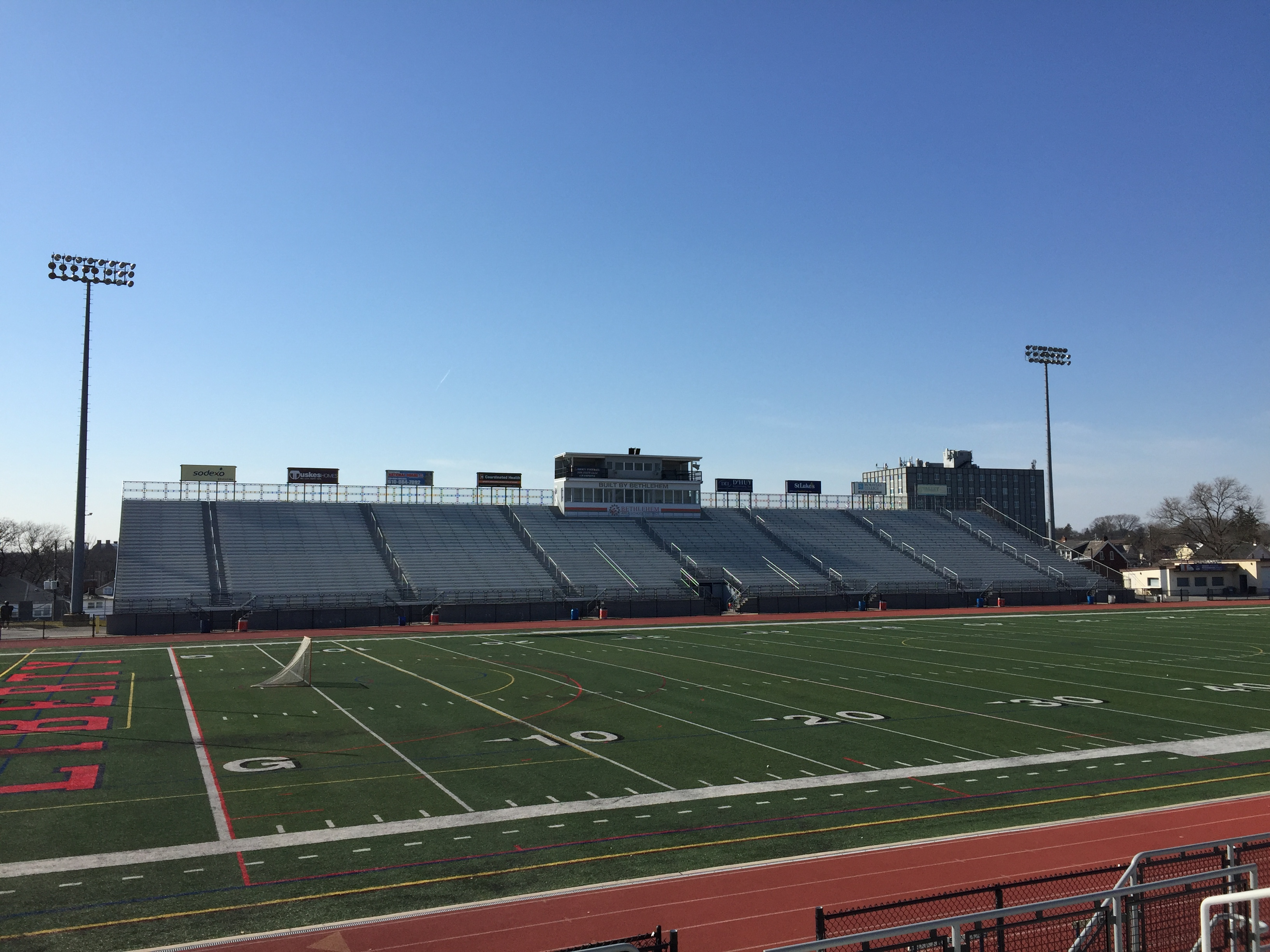
BASD Stadium, a 14,000-capacity stadium in Bethlehem, is the home field for three large Bethlehem-based EPC high schools, Liberty High School, Freedom High School, and Bethlehem Catholic High School

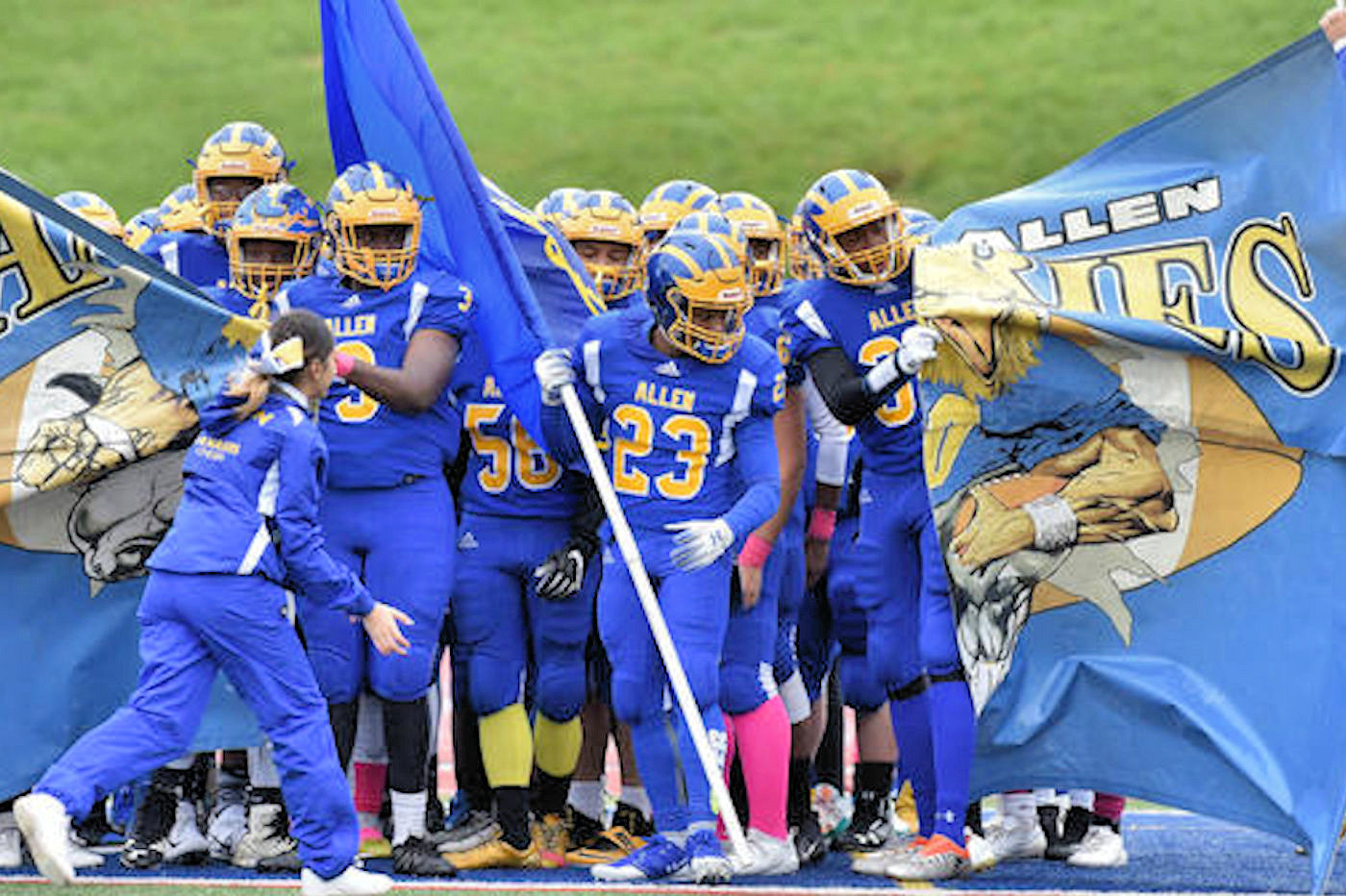
Allen High School's football team takes the field against crosstown rival Dieruff High School in an October 2018 EPC game

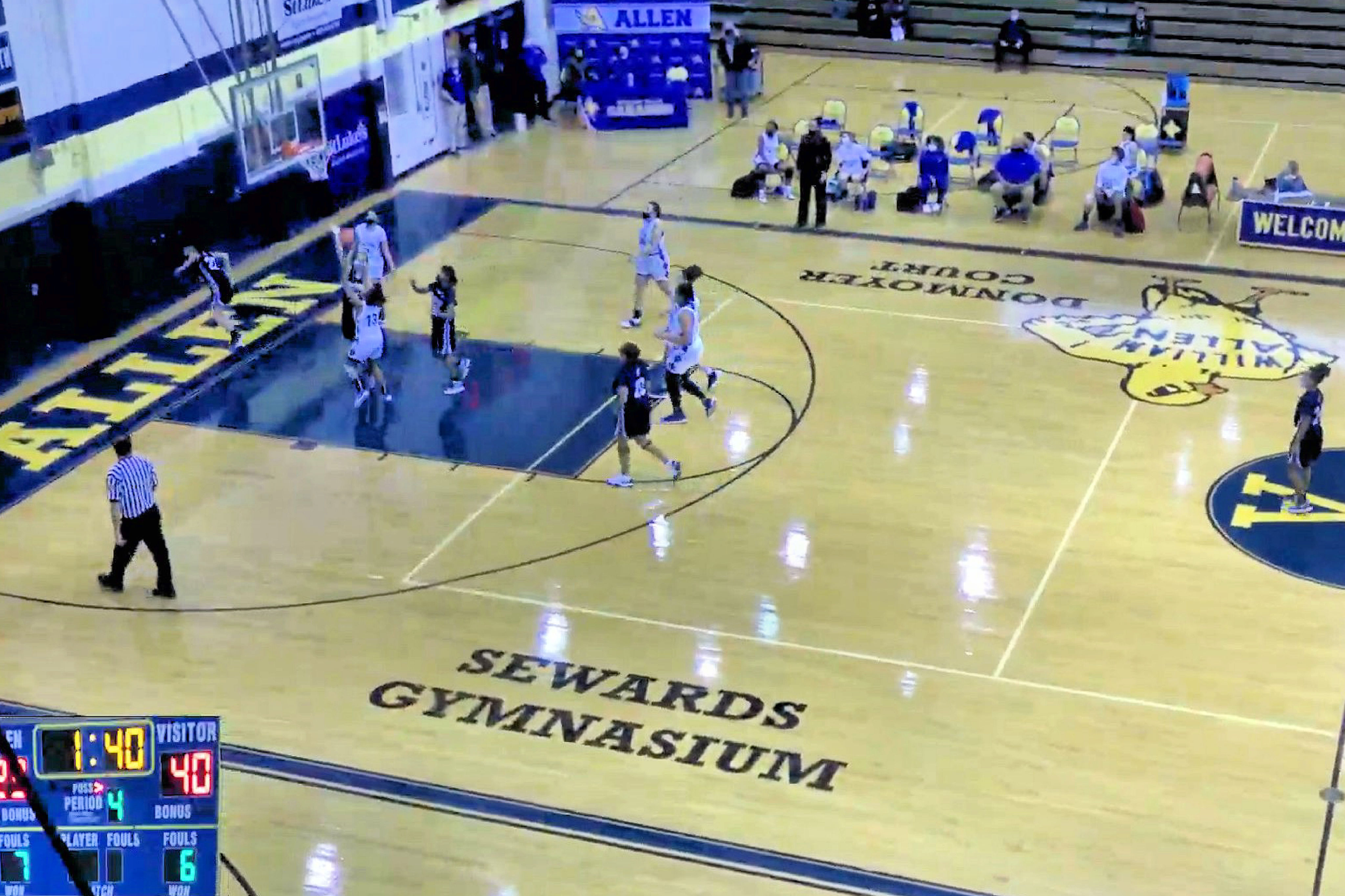
The J. Milo Sewards Gymnasium at Allen High School in February 2021

The Eastern Pennsylvania Conference, known informally as EPC, EPC18, and East Penn Conference, is an athletic conference consisting of 18 large high schools from Lehigh, Monroe, Northampton, and Pike counties in the Lehigh Valley and Pocono Mountain regions of eastern and northeastern Pennsylvania. The conference is part of District XI in the Pennsylvania Interscholastic Athletic Association (PIAA).

The Eastern Pennsylvania Conference holds many Pennsylvania and national records and milestones in high school athletic competition. The conference is known for producing many athletes who have gone on to compete in the Olympics and professional sports, including Major League Baseball, the National Basketball Association, and the National Football League. The conference's high school wrestling programs have been labeled "among the nation’s best in the sport for nearly three decades" and WIN magazine has ranked the EPC and Lehigh Valley best in the nation for wrestling.

The Eastern Pennsylvania Conference is also home to two of the nation's largest high school football stadiums, J. Birney Crum Stadium, a 15,000 capacity stadium in Allentown, and Frank Banko Field at Bethlehem Area School District Stadium, a 14,000 capacity in Bethlehem.

== History ==
On October 2, 2013, the Lehigh Valley Conference, consisting of 12 schools from the Lehigh Valley, voted to invite six large Mountain Valley Conference schools to the conference, expanding it to a super conference of 18 large Pennsylvania high schools. The EPC was officially announced on June 4, 2014, and the conference's play began in the 2014–15 school year. The conference is widely considered one of the premier high school athletic divisions in the nation.

== High schools ==
The 18 high school teams in the Eastern Pennsylvania Conference (with location in parentheses) are:

- Mountain Division
  - East Stroudsburg High School North Timberwolves (Dingmans Ferry)
  - East Stroudsburg High School South Cavaliers (East Stroudsburg)
  - Pleasant Valley High School Bears (Brodheadsville)
  - Pocono Mountain East High School Cardinals (Swiftwater)
  - Pocono Mountain West High School Panthers (Pocono Summit)
  - Stroudsburg High School Mountaineers (Stroudsburg)
- Skyline Division
  - Allentown Central Catholic High School Vikings (Allentown)
  - Emmaus High School Green Hornets (Emmaus)
  - Nazareth Area High School Blue Eagles (Nazareth)
  - Northampton Area High School Konkrete Kids (Northampton)
  - Parkland High School Trojans (Allentown)
  - Whitehall High School Zephyrs (Whitehall Township)
- Steel Division
  - Allen High School Canaries (Allentown)
  - Bethlehem Catholic High School Golden Hawks (Bethlehem)
  - Dieruff High School Huskies (Allentown)
  - Easton Area High School Red Rovers (Easton)
  - Freedom High School Patriots (Bethlehem Township)
  - Liberty High School Hurricanes (Bethlehem)

== Conference championships and records ==
=== Baseball ===
Baseball uses the primary divisional conference alignment.

District and state championships

School	District Title(s)	Year(s)	State Title(s)	Year(s)
Bethlehem Catholic	5	1996, 2005, 2006, 2007, 2021	0	–
Dieruff	2	1987, 1988	0	–
Easton	2	1990, 1993	0	–
Emmaus	2	2000, 2005	0	–
Freedom	2	1999, 2018	0	–
Liberty	4	1991, 2001, 2002, 2007	0	–
Nazareth	3	2006, 2011, 2012	0	–
Northampton	1	1997	0	–
Parkland	5	1992, 2003, 2009, 2013, 2014	0	–
Pleasant Valley	1	2010	0	–
Whitehall	4	1984, 2004, 2005, 2008	0	–
William Allen	1	1995	0	–

=== Boys basketball ===
Boys basketball uses the primary divisional conference alignment.

Conference champions

Year	EPC Tournament	Mountain Division	Record	Skyline Division	Record	Steel Division	Record
2014–15	Parkland	Stroudsburg	14–2 (10–0)	Parkland	16–0 (10–0)	Liberty	14–2 (9–1)

District and state championships

School	District Title(s)	Year(s)	State Title(s)	Year(s)
Allentown Central Catholic	17	1986, 1989, 1992, 1993, 1994, 1995, 1997, 2000, 2001, 2004, 2005, 2006, 2008, 2011, 2012, 2013, 2014	2	1984, 1986
Bethlehem Catholic	4	1998, 2002, 2018, 2019	0	–
East Stroudsburg South	3	1994, 2018, 2021	0	–
Easton	1	2007	0	–
Emmaus	1	1986	0	–
Liberty	4	1987, 1995, 2008, 2010	0	–
Parkland	7	2000, 2001, 2003, 2009, 2013, 2014, 2015	0	–
Pleasant Valley	1	1998	0	–
Pocono Mountain West	1	2012	0	–
Stroudsburg	2	1996, 1999	0	–
Whitehall	11	1981, 1982, 1983, 1985, 1989, 1990, 1991, 1992, 1997, 2004, 2005	1	1982
William Allen	7	1984, 1988, 1993, 2002, 2006, 2011, 2019	5	1935, 1945, 1946, 1947, 1951

=== Girls basketball ===
Girls basketball uses the primary divisional conference alignment.

Conference champions

Year	EPC Tournament	Mountain Division	Record	Skyline Division	Record	Steel Division	Record
2014–15	Bethlehem Catholic	Pocono Mountain West	13–3 (9–1)	Allentown Central Catholic	16–0 (10–0)	Bethlehem Catholic	16–0 (10–0)

District and state championships

School	District Title(s)	Year(s)	State Title(s)	Year(s)
Allentown Central Catholic	21	1987, 1989, 1990, 1991, 1992, 1993, 1994, 1996, 1998, 2000, 2001, 2002, 2003, 2004, 2005, 2006, 2007, 2008, 2009, 2010, 2012	7	1973, 1978, 1987, 2001, 2002, 2003, 2004
Bethlehem Catholic	10	1992, 1993, 1994, 1995, 2013, 2014, 2015, 2017, 2018, 2019	1	2019
Dieruff	0	–	2	1975, 1976
Easton	2	1999, 2017	0	–
Emmaus	4	1998, 2001, 2002, 2004	0	–
Freedom	3	1987, 2006, 2018	0	–
Liberty	2	2000, 2009	0	–
Nazareth	5	2013, 2015, 2016, 2020, 2021	0	–
Northampton	5	1995, 1997, 2010, 2011, 2019	0	–
Parkland	3	2005, 2007, 2014	1	2006
Pleasant Valley	1	2003	0	–
Whitehall	2	1986, 1988	0	–
William Allen	1	2008	1	1981

=== Boys cross country ===
In boys cross country, no divisional conference alignment is used.

Conference champions

Year	Regular season	Record	Championship	Points	Individual Champion	Time
2014	Easton	15–0	Easton	47	Colin Abert (Easton)	16:02

District and state championships

School	District Title(s)	Year(s)	State Title(s)	Year(s)
Allentown Central Catholic	2	1989, 2014	0	–
Easton	10	1985, 1986, 1991, 1992, 1996, 1997, 2003, 2014, 2018, 2019	0	–
Emmaus	1	1994	0	–
Freedom	2	2012, 2013	0	–
Liberty	6	1990, 1993, 1995, 2004, 2007, 2008	0	–
Nazareth	1	2010	0	–
Parkland	6	2005, 2006, 2009, 2011, 2016, 2017	0	–
William Allen	2	1988, 1989	0	–

Individual state champions:

- Mickey Collins (Easton) – 1970

=== Girls cross country ===
In girls cross country, no divisional conference alignment is used.

Conference champions

Year	Regular season	Record	Championship	Points	Individual Champion	Time
2014	Easton	15–0	Parkland	80	Raisa Kochmaruk (Liberty)	19:27

District and state championships

School	District Title(s)	Year(s)	State Title(s)	Year(s)
Allentown Central Catholic	3	2003, 2004, 2005	1	2001
Easton	4	1989, 2014, 2018, 2019	0	–
Emmaus	11	1985, 1988, 1990, 1993, 1994, 1995, 1996, 2006, 2007, 2008, 2009	3	2007, 2008, 2009
Liberty	4	1991, 1992, 1997, 2010	0	–
Northampton	1	1987	0	–
Parkland	3	2011, 2012, 2013	1	2000
William Allen	1	1986	0	–

Individual state champions:

- Janelle Thomas (Liberty) – 1992, 1994, 1995
- Frances Koons (Allentown Central Catholic) – 2003
- Jessica Cygan (Liberty) – 2008

=== Field hockey ===
In field hockey, no divisional conference alignment is used.

Conference champions

Year	EPC Tournament	Mountain Division	Record	Skyline Division	Record	Steel Division	Record
2014	Stroudsburg	Stroudsburg	15–0 (10–0)	Emmaus	13–0–1 (7–0–1)	Easton	14–1–1 (10–0)

District and state championships

School	District Title(s)	Year(s)	State Title(s)	Year(s)
Emmaus	26	1989, 1990, 1991, 1992, 1993, 1994, 1995, 1996, 1997, 1998, 1999, 2000, 2001, 2002, 2003, 2004, 2005, 2006, 2007, 2008, 2009, 2010, 2011, 2012, 2013, 2014	9	1991, 1992, 1996, 1997, 2001, 2004, 2005, 2007, 2010
Stroudsburg	0	–	1	1980

=== Football ===
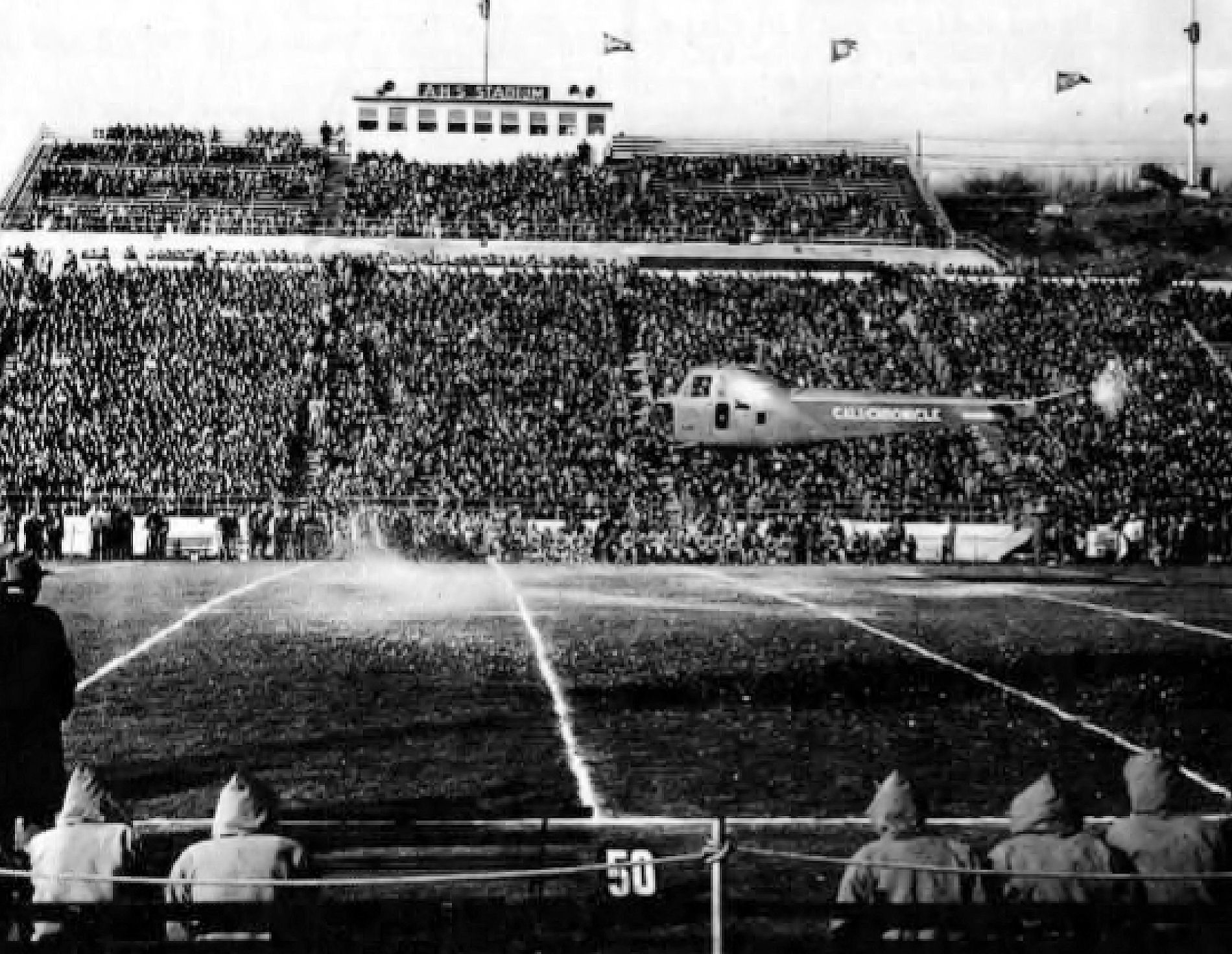
A helicopter landing at J. Birney Crum Stadium in Allentown prior to William Allen High School's football game on Thanksgiving Day, November 25, 1948

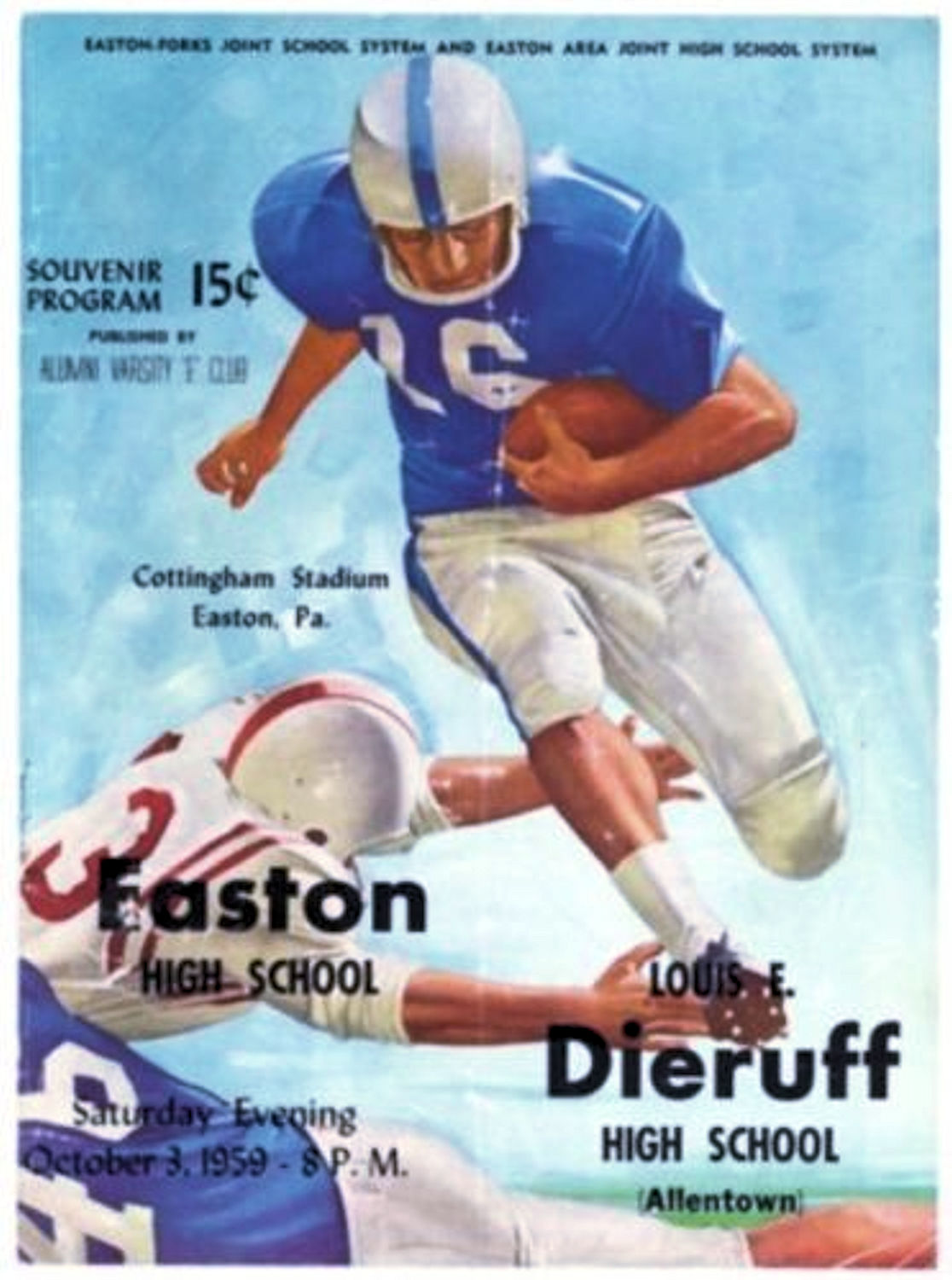
The program for Dieruff High School vs. Easton Area High School football game at Cottingham Stadium in Easton on October 3, 1959

Football uses the following adjusted divisional conference alignment, which changes slightly every two years:

North: Dieruff, East Stroudsburg North, East Stroudsburg South, Northampton, Pleasant Valley, Pocono Mountain East, Pocono Mountain West, Stroudsburg, and William Allen
South: Allentown Central Catholic, Bethlehem Catholic, Easton, Emmaus, Freedom, Liberty, Nazareth, Parkland, and Whitehall

From the 2014 through 2017 seasons, Northampton was in the South division. From the 2014 through 2015 seasons, Bethlehem Catholic was in the North division. For 2016–17, Allentown Central Catholic was in the North division.

Division champions

Year	North Division	Record	South Division	Record
2014	Stroudsburg	10–0 (8–0)	Easton	10–0 (8–0)
2019	Northampton	10–2 (8–0)	Nazareth	12–2 (7–1)
2021	Northampton	12–1 (8–0)	Parkland	9–2 (7–1)
2022	Northampton	12–1 (8–0)	Emmaus	10–2 (7–1)

District and state championships

School	District Title(s)	Year(s)	State Title(s)	Year(s)
Allentown Central Catholic	12	1991, 1993, 1994, 1996, 1997, 1998, 2003, 2009, 2010, 2011, 2012, 2021	3	1993, 1998, 2010
Bethlehem Catholic	10	1985, 1988, 1989, 1990, 1992, 1999, 2000, 2001, 2013, 2014	2	1988, 1990
East Stroudsburg South	4	1985, 1995, 2018, 2021	0	–
Easton	7	1990, 1991, 1993, 2003, 2004, 2009, 2010	0	–
Liberty	4	1994, 2005, 2006, 2008	1	2008
Nazareth	3	1988, 1989, 2011	0	–
Parkland	7	1996, 1998, 2002, 2007, 2012, 2013, 2014, 2015, 2016, 2017	1	2002
Pocono Mountain East	1	1988	0	–
Whitehall	5	1986, 1989, 1997, 2016, 2017	0	–
William Allen	1	1992	0	–

=== Golf ===
Golf does not use any divisional conference alignment.

Conference champions

Year	Regular season	Record	Championship	Points	Boys champion	Score	Girls champion	Score
2014	Easton; Emmaus; Parkland	9–1	Emmaus	322	Nick Maff (Bethlehem Catholic)	77	Helen Hsu (Freedom)	79

District and state championships

School	District Title(s)	Year(s)	State Title(s)	Year(s)
Allentown Central Catholic	1	2013	0	–
Emmaus	2	2013, 2014	0	–
Northampton	1	2012	0	–
Parkland	4	2006, 2008, 2009, 2011	0	–

=== Boys lacrosse ===
Boys lacrosse uses the following adjusted divisional conference alignment:
East: Bethlehem Catholic, Liberty, Nazareth, Northampton, and Pleasant Valley
West: Allentown Central Catholic, Easton, Emmaus, Freedom, and Parkland
Dieruff, East Stroudsburg North, East Stroudsburg South, Pocono Mountain East, Pocono Mountain West, Stroudsburg, Whitehall, and William Allen do not participate in boys lacrosse.

District and state championships

School	District Title(s)	Year(s)	State Title(s)	Year(s)
Allentown Central Catholic	5	2011, 2012, 2018, 2021, 2022	1	2021
Emmaus	4	2009, 2010, 2013, 2014	0	–

Easton 2024, 2025

=== Girls lacrosse ===
Girls lacrosse uses the following adjusted divisional conference alignment:
Mountain: Nazareth, Northampton, and Pleasant Valley
Steel: Easton, Freedom, and Liberty
Skyline: Allentown Central Catholic, Emmaus, and Parkland
Bethlehem Catholic, Dieruff, East Stroudsburg North, East Stroudsburg South, Pocono Mountain East, Pocono Mountain West, Stroudsburg, Whitehall, and William Allen do not participate in girls lacrosse.

District and state championships

School	District Title(s)	Year(s)	State Title(s)	Year(s)
Emmaus	1	2011	0	–
Nazareth	2	2010, 2012	0	–
Parkland	1	2014	0	–

=== Boys soccer ===
Boys soccer uses the primary divisional conference alignment.

Conference champions

Year	EPC Tournament	Mountain Division	Record	Skyline Division	Record	Steel Division	Record
2014	Emmaus	Stroudsburg	13–3–1 (8–1–1)	Emmaus	15–1 (9–1)	Liberty	11–5 (8–2)

District and state championships

School	District Title(s)	Year(s)	State Title(s)	Year(s)
Allentown Central Catholic	1	2012	0	–
Bethlehem Catholic	1	2007	0	–
Easton	1	2010	0	–
Emmaus	11	1991, 1994, 1995, 1996, 2000, 2001, 2004, 2005, 2006, 2011, 2015	0	–
Freedom	1	1990	1	1983
Liberty	3	1989, 1992, 1993	1	1975
Parkland	9	1997, 1998, 1999, 2002, 2003, 2007, 2008, 2013, 2022	0	–
Stroudsburg	2	2009, 2012	0	–

=== Girls soccer ===
Girls soccer uses the primary divisional alignment.

Conference champions

Year	EPC Tournament	Mountain Division	Record	Skyline Division	Record	Steel Division	Record
2014	Parkland	Stroudsburg	14–1–1 (9–0–1)	Parkland	13–1–2 (8–0–2)	Easton	13–2–1 (10–0)

District and state championships

School	District Title(s)	Year(s)	State Title(s)	Year(s)
Allentown Central Catholic	2	2009, 2010	0	–
Easton	1	2013	0	–
Emmaus	8	1993, 1994, 1997, 1998, 2005, 2006, 2007, 2009	1	1997
Nazareth	2	2008, 2010	0	–
Parkland	8	1996, 1999, 2000, 2002, 2003, 2004, 2011, 2012 (F)	0	–
Whitehall	2	2012 (S), 2014	0	–

=== Softball ===
Softball uses the primary divisional alignment.

District and state championships

School	District Title(s)	Year(s)	State Title(s)	Year(s)
Allentown Central Catholic	1	2006	0	–
Bethlehem Catholic	7	2003, 2005, 2006, 2009, 2011, 2013, 2014	0	–
Easton	1	2011	0	–
Emmaus	2	2003, 2007	1	2000
Liberty	1	2012	0	–
Nazareth	1	2006	0	–
Northampton	1	2013	1	1996
Parkland	3	2004, 2005, 2014	4	1975, 1995, 1998, 2009
Stroudsburg	1	2010	0	–
Whitehall	1	2009	0	–
William Allen	0	–	1	1990

=== Boys swimming and diving ===
Boys swimming and diving does not use the divisional conference alignment. Pleasant Valley and Bethlehem Catholic do not participate in boys swimming and diving. In addition, East Stroudsburg North, East Stroudsburg South, Pocono Mountain East, Pocono Mountain West, and Stroudsburg do not participate in boys diving.

Conference champions

Year	School	Record
2015	Emmaus	11–0

District and state championships

School	District Title(s)	Year(s)	State Title(s)	Year(s)
Allentown Central Catholic	3	2004, 2005, 2015	0	–
Emmaus	10	2005, 2006, 2008, 2009, 2010, 2011, 2012, 2013, 2014, 2015	0	–
Parkland	2	2004, 2007	0	–

=== Girls swimming and diving ===
Girls swimming and diving does not use the divisional conference alignment. Pleasant Valley and Bethlehem Catholic do not participate in girls swimming and diving. East Stroudsburg North, East Stroudsburg South, Pocono Mountain East, Pocono Mountain West, and Stroudsburg do not participate in girls diving.

Conference champions

Year	School	Record
2015	Parkland	11–0

District and state championships

School	District Title(s)	Year(s)	State Title(s)	Year(s)
Allentown Central Catholic	2	2004, 2009	0	–
Emmaus	1	2008	2	2004, 2005
Parkland	11	2004, 2005, 2006, 2007, 2009, 2010, 2011, 2012, 2013, 2014, 2015	2	2001, 2003

=== Boys track and field ===
Boys track and field does not use any divisional conference alignment.

=== Girls track and field ===
Girls track and field does not use any divisional conference alignment.

=== Boys tennis ===
Boys tennis does not use any divisional conference alignment.

District and state championships

School	District Title(s)	Year(s)	State Title(s)	Year(s)
Emmaus	1	2004	0	–
Parkland	7	2005, 2006, 2007, 2008, 2012, 2013, 2014	0	–

Individual state champions:

- Dennis Koch (William Allen) – 1960
- Rupert/Book (Liberty) – 1961
- Colin Delaney (Parkland) – 1988
- Tarek El-Bassiouni (Stroudsburg) – 1998
- Sean Montgomery (East Stroudsburg South) – 2001

=== Girls tennis ===
Girls tennis does not use any divisional conference alignment.

Conference champions

Year	Regular season	Record	Championship
2014	East Stroudsburg South; Liberty; Nazareth	10–1	East Stroudsburg South

District and state championships

School	District Title(s)	Year(s)	State Title(s)	Year(s)
Allentown Central Catholic	1	2005	0	–
Bethlehem Catholic	2	2003, 2006	0	–
Freedom	0	–	1	2002
Northampton	2	2003, 2004	0	–
Parkland	5	2007, 2008, 2011, 2012, 2013	0	–
Stroudsburg	1	2009	0	–
Whitehall	1	2010	0	–

Individual state champions:

- Granson/Granson (Freedom) – 1996
- Granson/Granson (Freedom) – 1997

=== Boys volleyball ===
Boys volleyball does not use any divisional conference alignment.
Allentown Central Catholic, East Stroudsburg North, East Stroudsburg South, Pleasant Valley, and Stroudsburg do not participate in boys volleyball.

District and state championships

School	District Title(s)	Year(s)	State Title(s)	Year(s)
Bethlehem Catholic	4	2007, 2008, 2009, 2010	0	–
Emmaus	3	2011, 2012, 2013	0	–
Freedom	4	2004, 2005, 2006, 2009	0	–
Liberty	1	2007	0	–
Parkland	2	2008, 2014	0	–
Whitehall	1	2010	0	–

=== Girls volleyball ===
Girls volleyball uses the primary divisional conference alignment.

Conference champions

Year	EPC Tournament	Mountain Division	Record	Skyline Division	Record	Steel Division	Record
2014	Parkland	Pleasant Valley	11–5 (9–1)	Parkland	16–0 (10–0)	Bethlehem Catholic	15–1 (10–0)

District and state championships

School	District Title(s)	Year(s)	State Title(s)	Year(s)
Allentown Central Catholic	7	2003, 2004, 2005, 2006, 2007, 2008, 2009	3	2001, 2007, 2008
Bethlehem Catholic	6	2005, 2007, 2008, 2012, 2013, 2014	0	–
Freedom	1	2003	0	–
Parkland	4	2010, 2011, 2012, 2014	2	2011, 2014

=== Wrestling ===
Wrestling uses the following adjusted divisional conference alignment:
Division A: Allentown Central Catholic, Dieruff, East Stroudsburg South, Easton, Freedom, Nazareth, Parkland, Pocono Mountain East, and William Allen
Division B: Bethlehem Catholic, East Stroudsburg North, Emmaus, Liberty, Northampton, Pleasant Valley, Pocono Mountain West, Stroudsburg, and Whitehall

District and state championships

School	District Title(s)	Year(s)	State Title(s)	Year(s)
Bethlehem Catholic	5	2011, 2012, 2013, 2014, 2015	8	1979 (Ind.), 2011 (Team), 2012 (Ind.), 2012 (Team), 2013 (Ind.), 2013 (Team), 2014 (Ind.), 2014 (Team)
Easton	10	2001, 2002, 2003, 2004, 2005, 2007, 2010, 2011, 2012, 2013	10	1981 (Ind.), 1983 (Ind.), 1996 (Ind.), 1997 (Ind.), 2001 (Ind.), 2001 (Team), 2002 (Ind.), 2002 (Team), 2003 (Team), 2004 (Team)
Nazareth	2	2006, 2014	2	2006 (Ind.), 2007 (Team)
Northampton	5	1998, 1999, 2000, 2008, 2009	8	1993 (Ind.), 1994 (Ind.), 1995 (Ind.), 1998 (Ind.), 2000 (Ind.), 2000 (Team), 2003 (Ind.), 2004 (Ind.)

Individual state champions:

- Peter Cicchine (Liberty) – 1940, 135
- William Unangst (Liberty) – 1940, 155
- John McAuliffe (William Allen) – 1947, 138
- Charles Cope (Liberty) – 1947, 154
- Dick Rutt (Easton) – 1949, 103
- Harold Wilson (Nazareth) – 1954, 120
- Steve Micio (Northampton) – 1955, 133
- Ed Keglovits (Northampton) – 1955, 154
- R. Rohrbach (William Allen) – 1957, 127
- William Trexler (William Allen) – 1957, 133
- Bart Mosser (Liberty) – 1958, 127
- Al Rushatz (William Allen) – 1958, 165
- Dick Rushatz (William Allen) – 1959, 95
- Doug Koch (Liberty) – 1960, 133
- John Eckenrode (Liberty) – 1961, 138
- Alton Bowyer (Easton) – 1962, 95
- Dick DeWalt (Easton) – 1962, 133
- Dave Halulko (Dieruff) – 1964, 127
- Chuck Amato (Easton) – 1964, 165
- Charles Housner (Dieruff) – 1965, 145
- Randy Biggs (Liberty) – 1967, 95
- Geoff Baum (William Allen) – 1967, 180
- Craig Fox (Easton) – 1968, 133
- Dan Newhard (Dieruff) – 1968, 180
- Carl Lutes (Easton) – 1969, 112
- Dan Howard (Dieruff) – 1969, 133
- Rocco Creazzo (Easton) – 1971, 95
- Pat Sculley (Bethlehem Catholic) – 1973, 126
- Curt Stanley (Easton) – 1974, 132
- Darwin Brodt (Easton) – 1974, 167
- Bobby Weaver (Easton) – 1975, 98
- Rich McIntyre (Freedom) – 1975, 145
- Brian Statum (Liberty) – 1975, 155
- Bobby Weaver (Easton) – 1976, 98
- Brian Statum (Liberty) – 1976, 155
- Mike Brown (Bethlehem Catholic) – 1976, 185
- George Atiyeh (Dieruff) – 1976, UNL
- Bobby Weaver (Easton) – 1977, 105
- Billy Williams (Freedom) – 1977, 145
- George Atiyeh (Dieruff) – 1977, UNL
- Rich Santoro (Bethlehem Catholic) – 1978, 98
- Doug Billig (Parkland) – 1979, 98
- Rich Santoro (Bethlehem Catholic) – 1979, 112
- Tom Bold (Bethlehem Catholic) – 1979, 138
- John Cuvo (Easton) – 1980, 98
- Jim Bresnak (Liberty) – 1980, 105
- Bernie Brown (Bethlehem Catholic) – 1980, 185
- Randy Ascani (Easton) – 1981, 119
- Bernie Brown (Bethlehem Catholic) – 1981, 185
- Dennis Atiyeh (Dieruff) – 1981, UNL
- Jack Cuvo (Easton) – 1983, 98
- Mickey Torres (Liberty) – 1983, 112
- Jack Cuvo (Easton) – 1984, 98
- Sean Finkbeiner (Northampton) – 1984, 145
- Andy Voit (Dieruff) – 1984, 185
- Jack Cuvo (Easton) – 1985, 105
- Gino Capuano (Liberty) – 1985, 138
- Scott Schleicher (William Allen) – 1985, 145
- John Likins (Bethlehem Catholic) – 1986, 112
- Scott Hovan (William Allen) – 1986, 138
- Jeff Roth (William Allen) – 1986, 145
- Dave Foley (Bethlehem Catholic) – 1987, 105
- Scott Hovan (William Allen) – 1987, 145
- Brad Silimperi (Nazareth) – 1988, 98
- Ty Moore (Freedom) – 1988, 105
- Mike Miller (Nazareth) – 1989, 145
- Blayne Diacount (Bethlehem Catholic) – 1989, 160
- Tony Iasiello (Bethlehem Catholic) – 1989, 171
- Moss Grays (Easton) – 1990, 145
- Mike Miller (Nazareth) – 1990, 152
- Chad Billy (Northampton) – 1991, 112
- Ryan Nunamaker (Nazareth) – 1992, 130
- Mike Tomsic (Northampton) – 1993, 112
- Matt Roth (Parkland) – 1994, 112
- Dan Tashner (Nazareth) – 1994, 125
- Whitey Chlebove (Northampton) – 1994, 130
- Mark Getz (Nazareth) – 1994, 135
- Dennis Liberto (Northampton) – 1995, 103
- Travis Doto (Nazareth) – 1995, 145
- Jamarr Billman (Easton) – 1996, 130
- Chris Kelly (Easton) – 1997, 112
- Andy Cote (Nazareth) – 1997, 130
- Bryan Snyder (Easton) – 1997, 135
- Jamarr Billman (Easton) – 1997, 140
- Rob Rohn (Nazareth) – 1997, 189
- Derek Jenkins (Parkland) – 1998, 145
- Christian Luciano (Northampton) – 1998, 171
- Jon Trenge (Parkland) – 1998, 189
- John Hard (Northampton) – 1998, 275
- Jon Trenge (Parkland) – 1999, 189
- Steve Itterly (Nazareth) – 1999, 275
- Matt Ciasulli (Easton) – 2000, 112
- Ryan McCallum (Northampton) – 2000, 130
- Jake Giamoni (Easton) – 2000, 135
- Matt Ciasulli (Easton) – 2001, 119
- Jeff Ecklof (Northampton) – 2001, 125
- Gino Fortebuono (Easton) – 2001, 130
- Travis Frick (Nazareth) – 2001, 171
- Matt Ciasulli (Easton) – 2002, 125
- Mike Rogers (Easton) – 2002, 135
- Christian Franco (Whitehall) – 2002, 140
- David Rivera (Allentown Central Catholic) – 2002, 160
- Joey Ecklof (Northampton) – 2003, 135
- Jeff Ecklof (Northampton) – 2003, 145
- Josh Haines (Northampton) – 2003, 189
- Jon Oplinger (Northampton) – 2003, 215
- Joe Caramanica (Nazareth) – 2004, 135
- Joey Ecklof (Northampton) – 2004, 145
- Mike Rogers (Easton) – 2004, 152
- Nick Guida (Parkland) – 2004, 171
- Josh Haines (Northampton) – 2004, 189
- Jon Oplinger (Northampton) – 2004, 215
- Tim Darling (Nazareth) – 2005, 130
- Joe Caramanica (Nazareth) – 2005, 145
- Joey Ecklof (Northampton) – 2005, 152
- Bryan Reiss (Emmaus) – 2005, 275
- Jordan Oliver (Easton) – 2006, 103
- Tim Darling (Nazareth) – 2006, 145
- Kegan Handlovic (Easton) – 2007, 112
- Jordan Oliver (Easton) – 2007, 119
- Tim Darling (Nazareth) – 2007, 152
- Justin Wieller (Northampton) – 2007, 215
- Kegan Handlovic (Easton) – 2008, 119
- Jordan Oliver (Easton) – 2008, 130
- Ziad Haddad (Bethlehem Catholic) – 2008, 285
- Zach Horan (Nazareth) – 2011, 130
- Mitchell Minotti (Easton) – 2011, 140
- Michael Ottinger (Parkland) – 2011, 160
- Ethan Lizak (Parkland) – 2012, 106
- Darian Cruz (Bethlehem Catholic) – 2012, 106
- Randy Cruz (Bethlehem Catholic) – 2012, 132
- Elliot Riddick (Bethlehem Catholic) – 2012, 170
- Ethan Lizak (Parkland) – 2013, 113
- Aaron Bradley (Nazareth) – 2013, 285
- Darian Cruz (Bethlehem Catholic) – 2013, 120
- Jake Riegel (Bethlehem Catholic) – 2014, 106
- Luke Karam (Bethlehem Catholic) – 2014, 113
- Zeke Moisey (Bethlehem Catholic) – 2014, 126

== Eastern Pennsylvania Conference professional and Olympic athletes ==
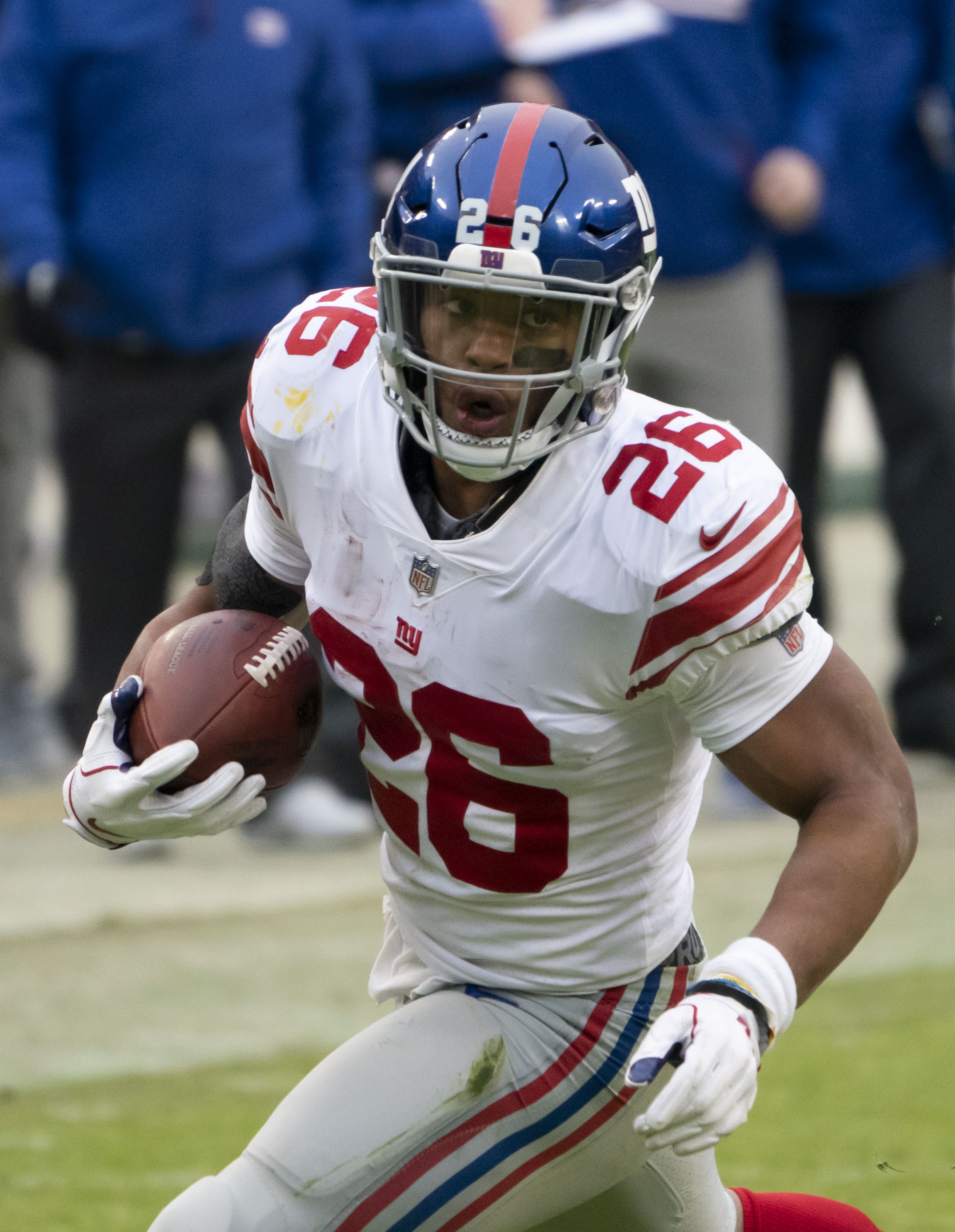
Saquon Barkley, Whitehall High School

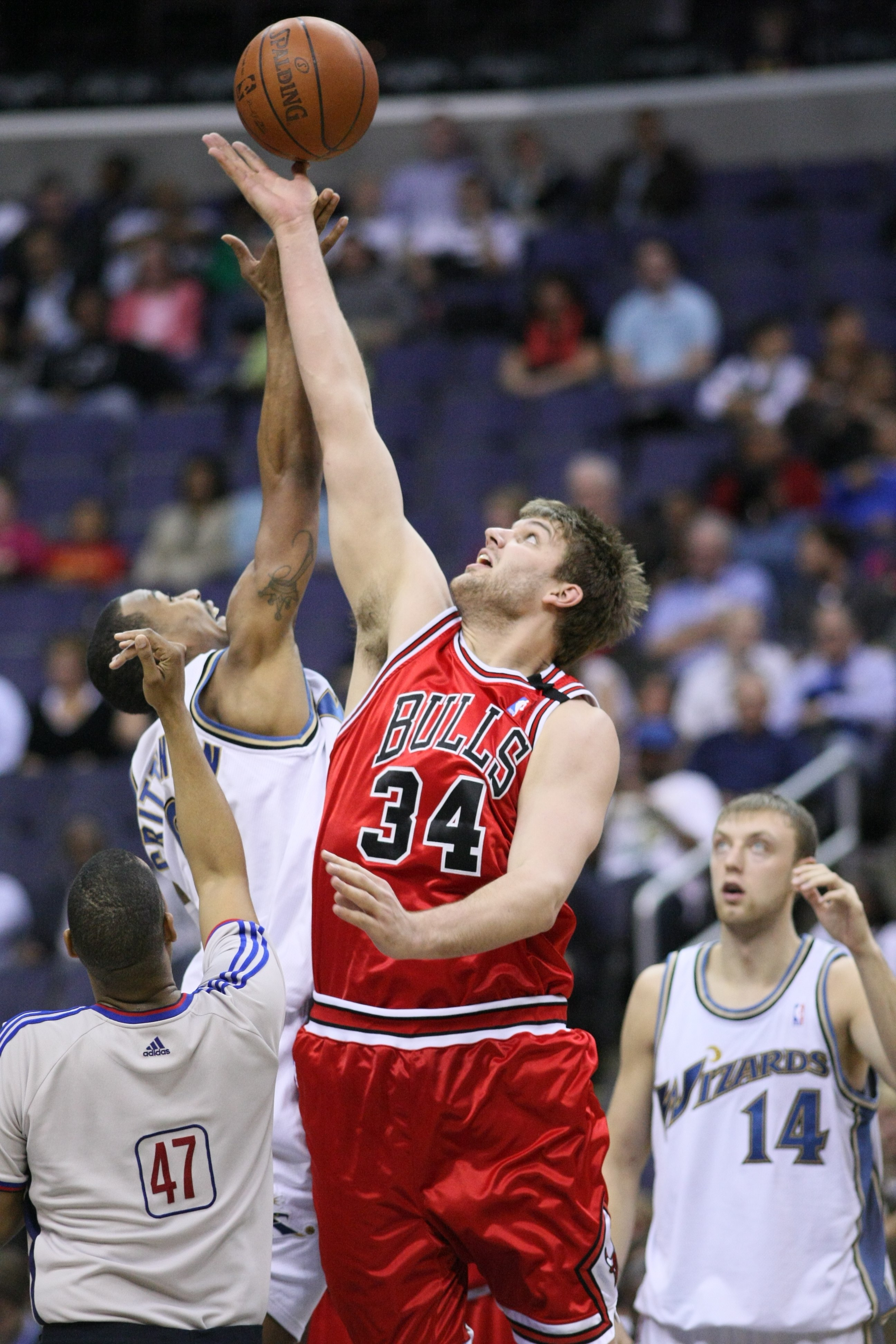
Aaron Gray, Emmaus High School

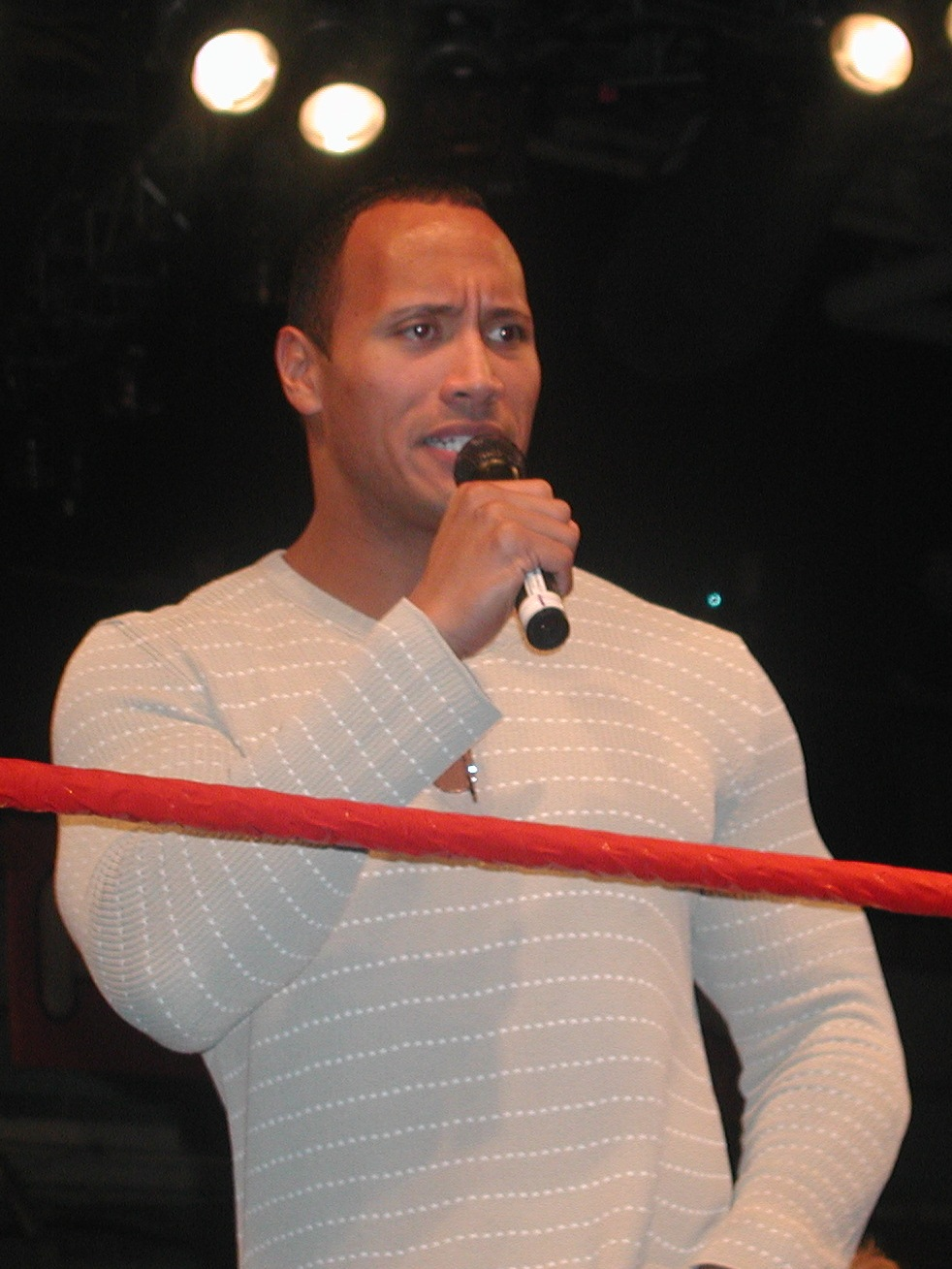
Dwayne "The Rock" Johnson, Freedom High School

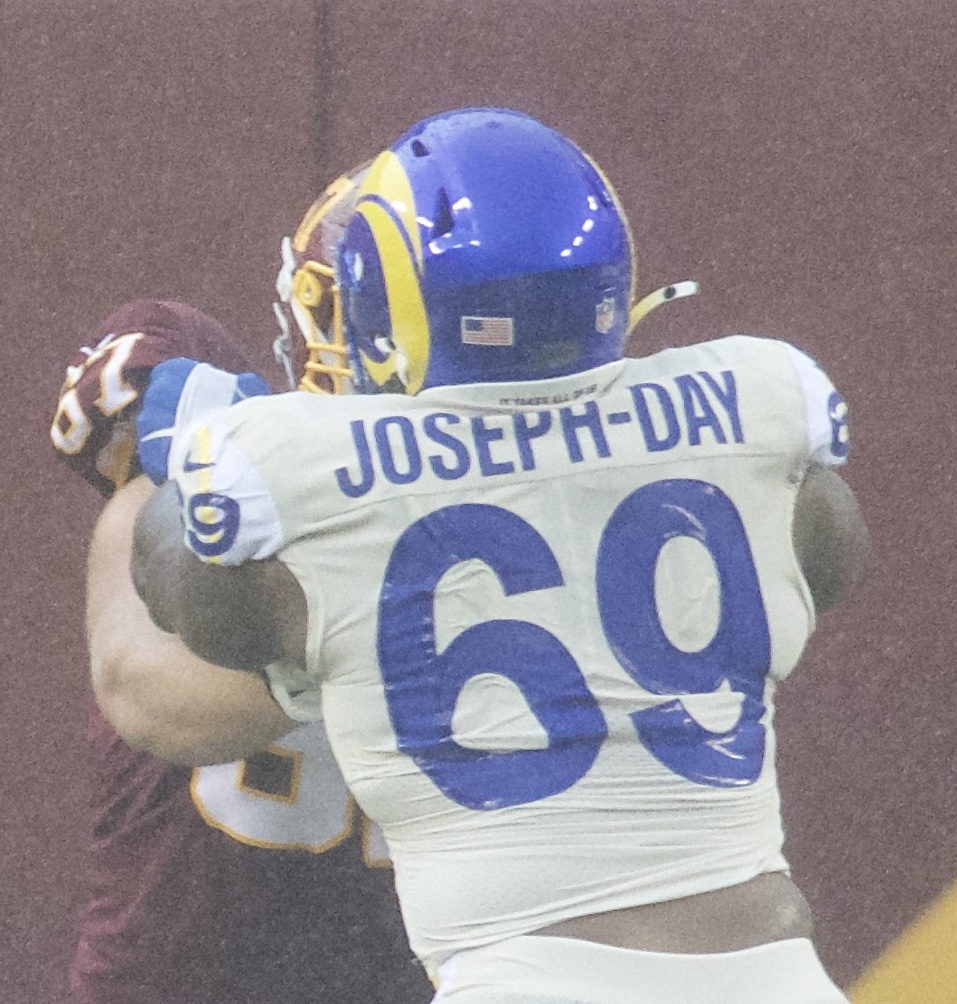
Sebastian Joseph-Day, Stroudsburg High School

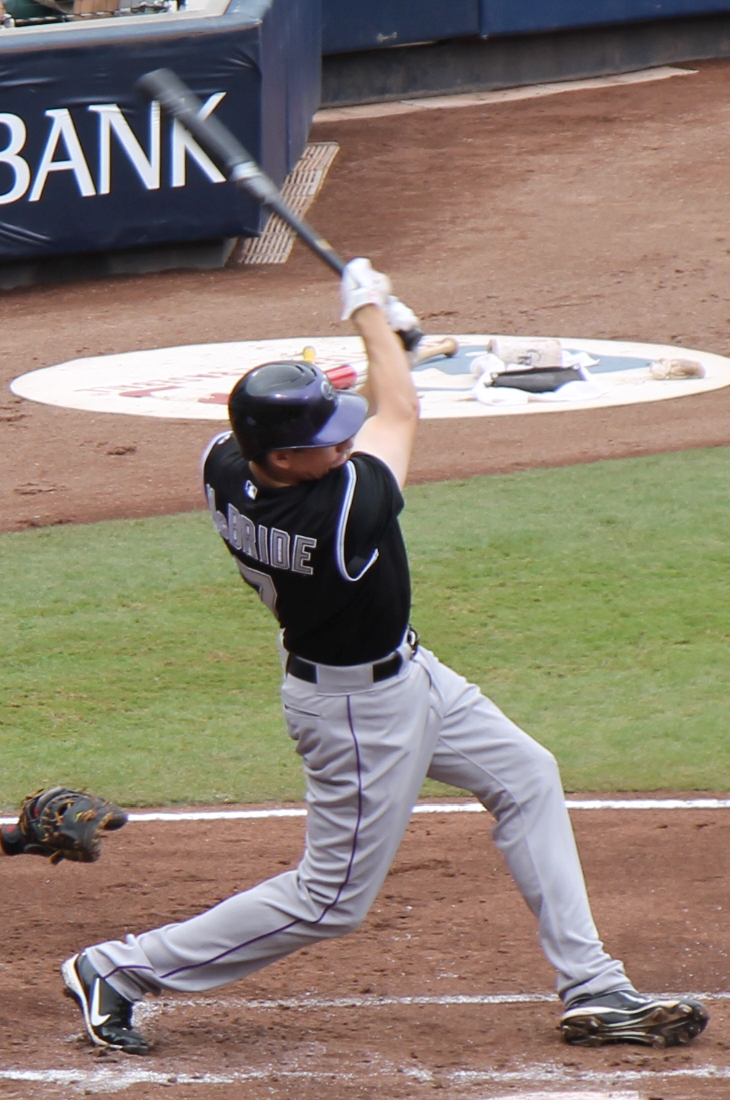
Matt McBride, Liberty High School

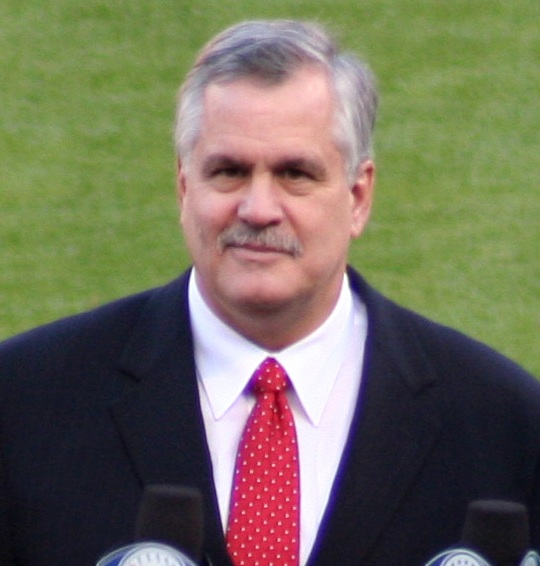
Matt Millen, Whitehall High School

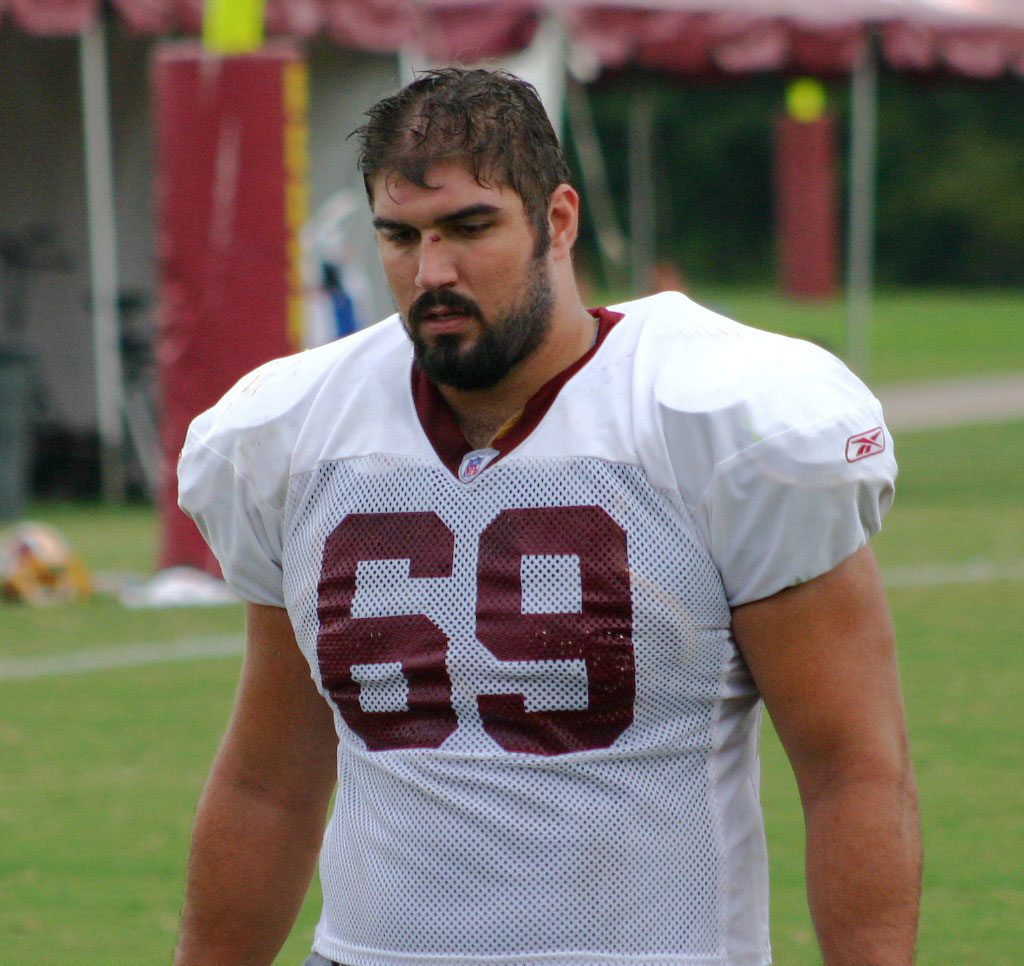
Jim Molinaro, Bethlehem Catholic High School

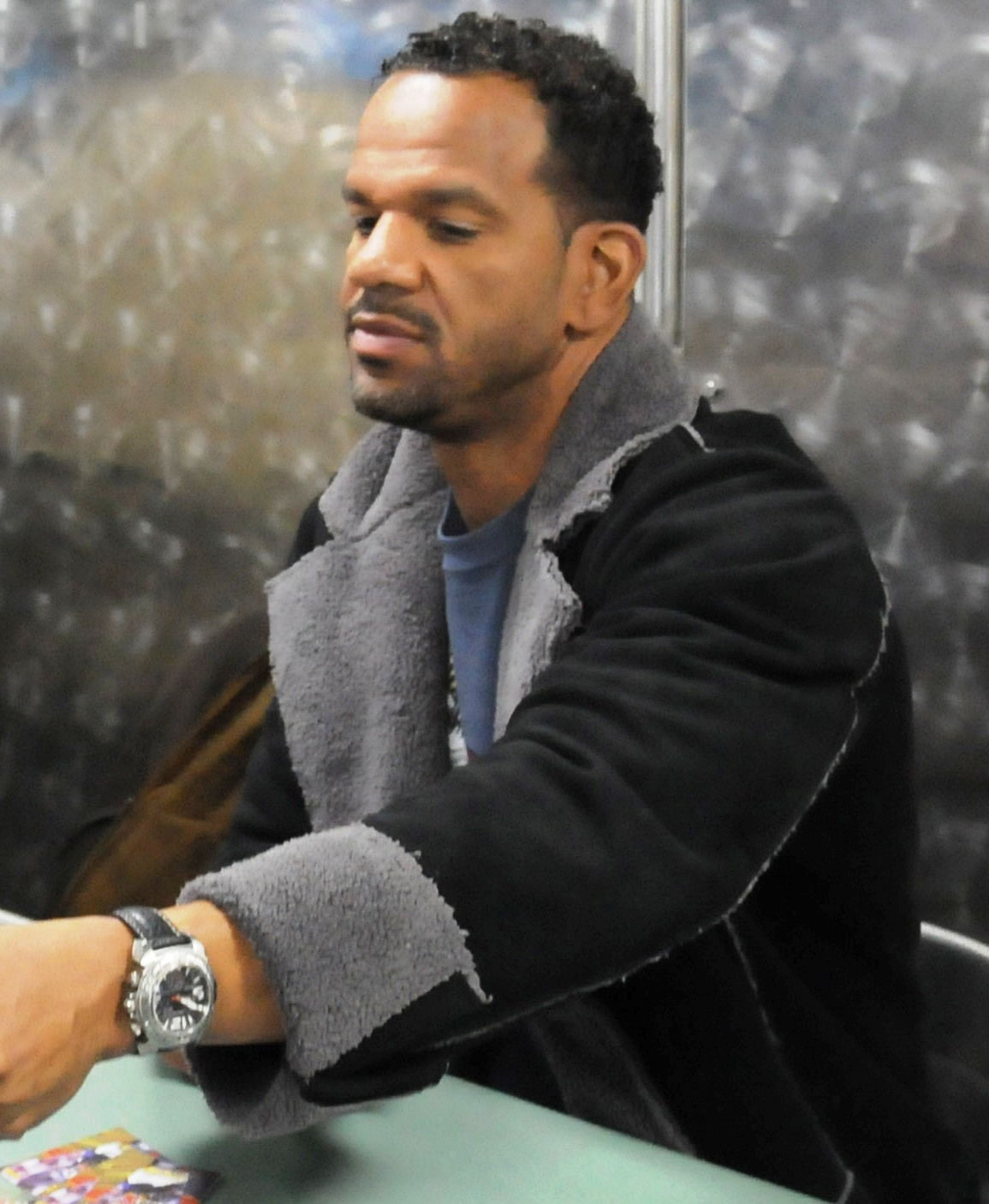
Andre Reed, Dieruff High School

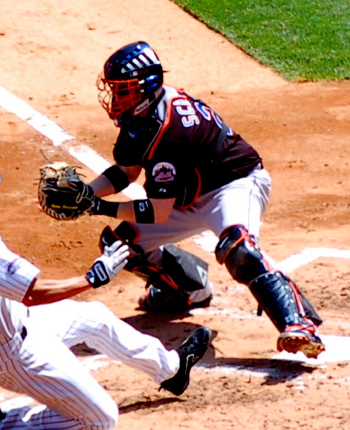
Brian Schneider, Northampton Area High School

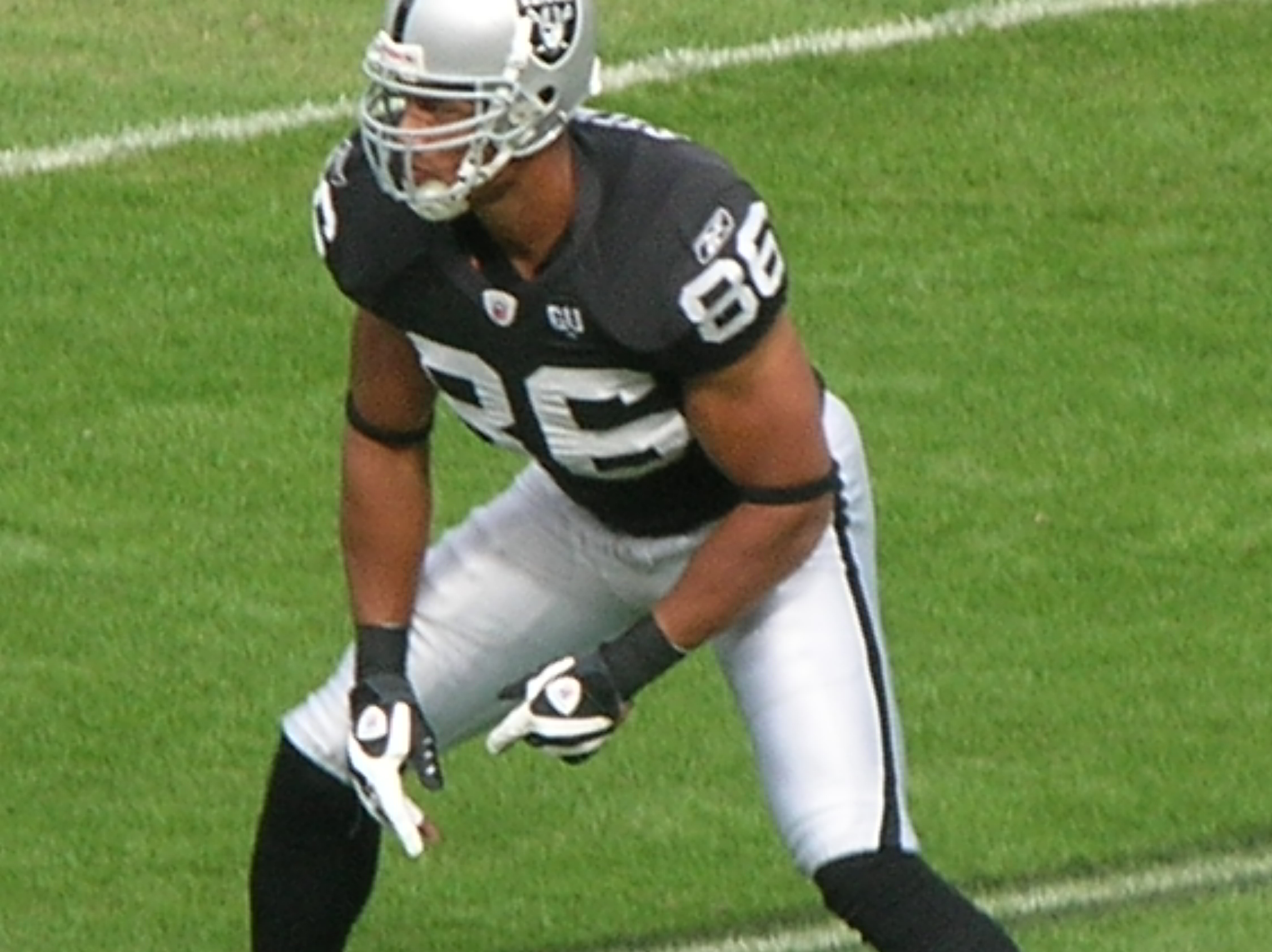
Tony Stewart, Allentown Central Catholic High School

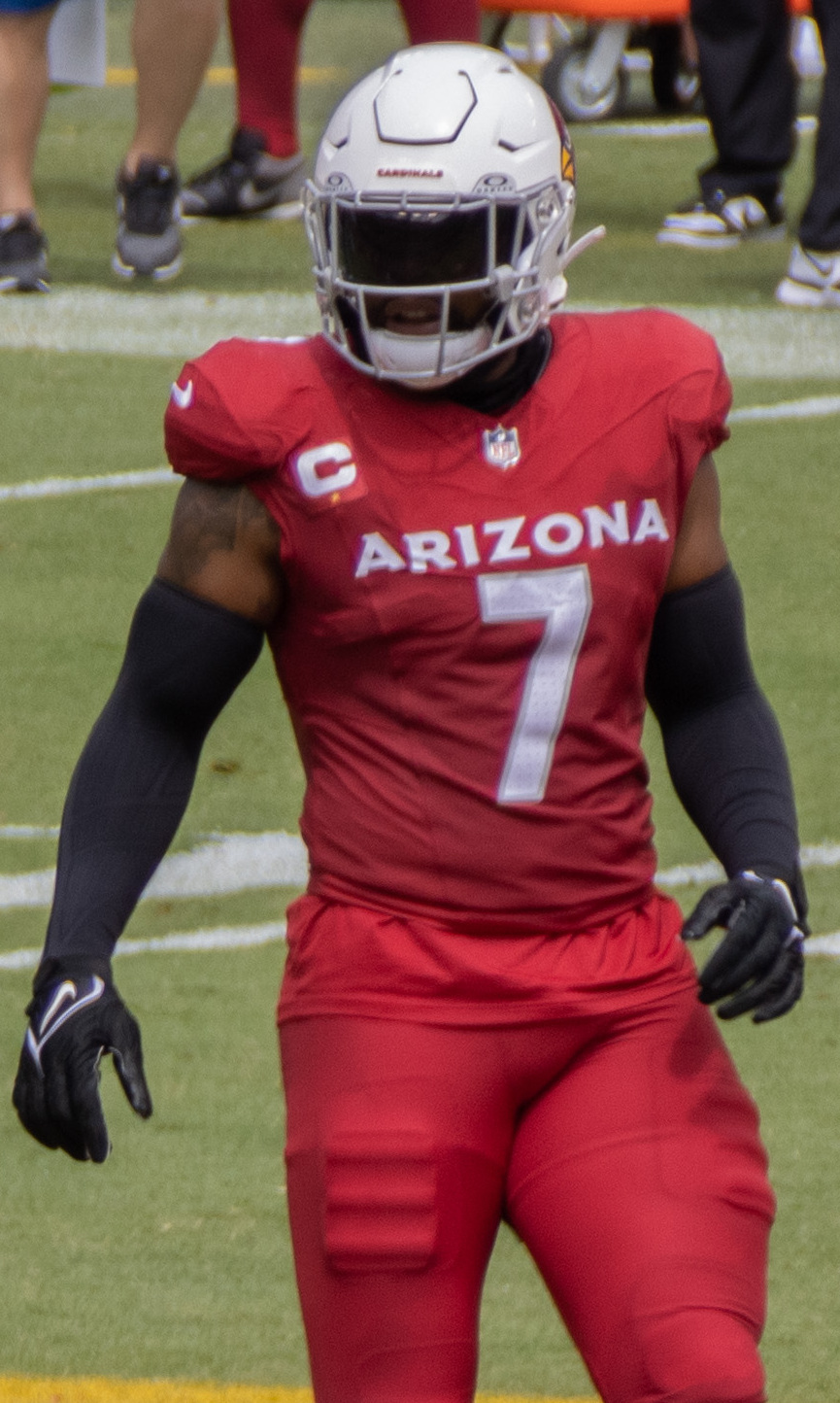
Kyzir White, Emmaus High School

The Eastern Pennsylvania Conference is known for producing a considerable number of present and former professional and Olympic athletes, including:

=== Major League Baseball (MLB) ===
==== Former MLB players ====
- Bob Heffner, former pitcher, Boston Red Sox, Cleveland Indians, and California Angels (William Allen High School)
- Gary Lavelle, former pitcher, Oakland Athletics, San Francisco Giants, and Toronto Blue Jays (Liberty High School)
- Matt McBride, former infielder, Colorado Rockies and Oakland Athletics (Liberty High School)
- Jeff Mutis, former pitcher, Cleveland Indians and Florida Marlins (Allentown Central Catholic High School)
- Dave Schneck, former outfielder, New York Mets (Whitehall High School)
- Brian Schneider, former catcher, Montreal Expos/Washington Nationals, New York Mets, and Philadelphia Phillies (Northampton Area High School)
- Curt Simmons, former pitcher, Chicago Cubs, Los Angeles Angels, Philadelphia Phillies, and St. Louis Cardinals (Whitehall High School)

=== National Basketball Association (NBA) ===
==== Former NBA players ====
- Aaron Gray, former center, Chicago Bulls, Detroit Pistons, New Orleans Hornets, and Sacramento Kings (Emmaus High School)
- Darrun Hilliard, former guard, Detroit Pistons and San Antonio Spurs (Liberty High School)
- Tyrese Martin, former shooting guard, Atlanta Hawks (William Allen High School)
- Brant Weidner, former forward, San Antonio Spurs (Parkland High School)

=== National Football League (NFL) ===
==== Current NFL players ====
- Jahan Dotson, wide receiver, Philadelphia Eagles (Nazareth Area High School)
- Saquon Barkley, running back, Philadelphia Eagles (Whitehall High School)
- Sebastian Joseph-Day, defensive end, Tennessee Titans (Stroudsburg High School)
- Kyzir White, linebacker, San Francisco 49ers (Emmaus High School)
- Kenny Yeboah, free agent tight end (Parkland High School)

==== Former NFL players ====
- Chuck Bednarik, former center and linebacker, Philadelphia Eagles, and member of the Pro Football Hall of Fame (Liberty High School)
- Greg DeLong, former tight end, Baltimore Ravens, Jacksonville Jaguars, and Minnesota Vikings, (Parkland High School)
- Keith Dorney, former offensive tackle, Detroit Lions (Emmaus High School)
- Jim Druckenmiller, former quarterback, Miami Dolphins and San Francisco 49ers (Northampton Area High School)
- Mike Guman, former running back, Los Angeles Rams (Bethlehem Catholic High School)
- Mike Hartenstine, former defensive end, Chicago Bears and Minnesota Vikings (Liberty High School)
- Nate Hobgood-Chittick, former defensive tackle, Kansas City Chiefs, San Francisco 49ers, and St. Louis Rams (William Allen High School)
- Kyshoen Jarrett, former strong safety, Washington Redskins (East Stroudsburg High School South)
- Dan Koppen, former center, Denver Broncos and New England Patriots (Whitehall High School)
- Tim Massaquoi, former tight end, Miami Dolphins (Parkland High School)
- Ed McCaffrey, former wide receiver, Denver Broncos, New York Giants, and San Francisco 49ers (Allentown Central Catholic High School)
- Kim McQuilken, former quarterback, Atlanta Falcons and Washington Redskins (William Allen High School)
- Joe Milinichik, former offensive guard, Detroit Lions, Los Angeles Rams, and San Diego Chargers (Emmaus High School)
- Matt Millen, former linebacker, Oakland Raiders, San Francisco 49ers, and Washington Redskins (Whitehall High School)
- Jim Molinaro, former offensive tackle, Dallas Cowboys and Washington Redskins (Bethlehem Catholic High School)
- James Mungro, former running back, Indianapolis Colts (East Stroudsburg High School South)
- Chris Neild, former nose tackle, Houston Texans (Stroudsburg High School)
- Artie Owens, former running back, Buffalo Bills, New Orleans Saints, and San Diego Chargers (Stroudsburg High School)
- Ken Parrish, former punter, Atlanta Falcons (East Stroudsburg High School South)
- Andre Reed, former wide receiver, Buffalo Bills and Washington Redskins, and member of the Pro Football Hall of Fame class of 2014 (Dieruff High School)
- Mike Reichenbach, former linebacker, Philadelphia Eagles and Miami Dolphins (Liberty High School)
- Ray Rissmiller, former offensive tackle, Buffalo Bills, Philadelphia Eagles, and New Orleans Saints (Easton Area High School)
- Larry Seiple, former punter, Miami Dolphins (William Allen High School)
- John Spagnola, former tight end, Green Bay Packers, Philadelphia Eagles, and Seattle Seahawks (Bethlehem Catholic High School)
- Tony Stewart, former tight end, Cincinnati Bengals, Oakland Raiders, and Philadelphia Eagles (Allentown Central Catholic High School)
- Devin Street, former wide receiver, Dallas Cowboys, Houston Texans, Indianapolis Colts, New England Patriots, and New York Jets (Liberty High School)
- Jimmy Terwilliger, former quarterback, Minnesota Vikings (East Stroudsburg High School South)
- Kevin White, former wide receiver, Chicago Bears, New Orleans Saints, and San Francisco 49ers (Emmaus High School)
- Andre Williams, former running back, Los Angeles Chargers and New York Giants (Parkland High School)
- Joe Williams, former running back, San Francisco 49ers (Emmaus High School)
- Joe Wolf, former offensive tackle, Arizona Cardinals (William Allen High School)

=== Former Arena Football League (AFL) players ===
- Kevin Nagle, former fullback and linebacker, Colorado Crush and Orlando Predators (Pleasant Valley High School)

=== Former NCAA Division I football players ===
- Steve Aponavicius, former placekicker, Boston College Eagles football and all-time career highest Boston College scorer (Easton Area High School)
- Dan Kendra, former quarterback, Florida State Seminoles football (Bethlehem Catholic High School)
- Afa Anoaʻi Jr., former Defensive Tackle, UConn Huskies football (Freedom High School)

=== Olympics ===
==== Olympic cycling ====
- Tanya Lindenmuth, 2000 Summer Olympics track cycling (Freedom High School)
- Marty Nothstein, 2000 Summer Olympics gold medal winner, track cycling (Emmaus High School)
- Lauren Tamayo, 2012 Summer Olympics, silver medalist, track cycling (Allentown Central Catholic High School)

==== Olympic field hockey ====
- Cindy Werley, 1996 Summer Olympics women's field hockey player (Emmaus High School)

==== Olympic gymnastics ====
- Hope Spivey, 1988 Summer Olympics gymnast (Allentown Central Catholic High School)

==== Olympic track and field ====
- Joe Kovacs, 2016 Summer Olympics, silver medalist, shot put (Bethlehem Catholic High School)

==== Olympic wrestling ====
- Joseph Atiyeh, 1984 Summer Olympics, silver medal winner for Syria, wrestling (Dieruff High School)
- Stanley Dziedzic, 1976 Summer Olympics bronze medal winner, wrestling (William Allen High School)
- Bobby Weaver, 1984 Summer Olympics gold medal winner, wrestling, and 1980 Summer Olympics wrestling team (boycotted) (Easton Area High School)

=== Professional auto racing ===
- Jeff Andretti, former professional race car driver (Nazareth Area High School)
- Michael Andretti, former IndyCar Series driver (Nazareth Area High School)
- Sage Karam, IndyCar Series driver (Nazareth Area High School)

=== Professional cycling ===
- Marty Nothstein, former professional track cyclist (Emmaus High School)
- Nicole Reinhart, former professional track cyclist (Emmaus High School)

=== Professional golf ===
- Jim Booros, former PGA Tour player (Dieruff High School)

=== Professional soccer ===
- Gina Lewandowski, former defender, FC Bayern Munich (Allentown Central Catholic High School)

=== Track and field ===
- Joe Kovacs, 2015 world champion, shot put (Bethlehem Catholic High School)
- Chanelle Price, 2014 IAAF World Indoor Championships, gold medalist, 800 meters (Easton Area High School)

=== Women's National Basketball Association (WNBA) ===
- Michelle M. Marciniak, former point guard, Portland Fire and Seattle Storm (Allentown Central Catholic High School)

=== World Wrestling Entertainment (WWE) ===
- Afa Anoa'i Jr., professional wrestler (Freedom High School)
- Dwayne "The Rock" Johnson, former professional wrestler (Freedom High School)
- Billy Kidman, former professional wrestler (Parkland High School)
- Brian Knobs, former professional wrestler (Whitehall High School)
- Jerry Sags, former professional wrestler (Whitehall High School)

== Professional and collegiate coaches and managers ==
Eastern Pennsylvania Conference athletes who have gone on to athletic coaching and team management careers include:

=== College basketball coaches ===
- Michelle M. Marciniak, former South Carolina assistant coach (Allentown Central Catholic High School)
- Billy McCaffrey, former St. Bonaventure head coach (Allentown Central Catholic High School)

=== College football coaches ===
- Chuck Amato, former North Carolina State head coach (Easton Area High School)
- K. C. Keeler, Temple head coach (Emmaus High School)

=== College wrestling coaches ===
- Bob Ferraro, former Bucknell head wrestling coach (Easton Area High School)
- John Fritz, former Penn State head coach (Liberty High School)
- Pat Santoro, Lehigh head wrestling coach and former Maryland Terrapins head wrestling coach (Bethlehem Catholic High School)
- Bryan Snyder, Nebraska associate coach (Easton Area High School)
- Jay Weiss, Harvard head wrestling coach (William Allen High School)

=== National Basketball Association (NBA) coaches ===
- Pete Carril, former Sacramento Kings assistant coach and former Princeton Tigers men's basketball head coach (Liberty High School)
- Aaron Gray, former Detroit Pistons assistant coach (Emmaus High School)

=== National Football League (NFL) coaches and management ===
- Matt Millen, former Detroit Lions president and general manager (Whitehall High School)

== See also ==
- Colonial League
- Lehigh Valley Conference
- Mountain Valley Conference
- PIAA District 11
