= Woodling =

Woodling is a surname. Notable people with the surname include:

- Gene Woodling (1922–2001), American baseball player, coach, and scout
- Homer E. Woodling (1902–1984), American college sports coach and administrator
- Stephanie Woodling, American opera singer

== See also ==
- Woodling Gym
