= Bethlehem Catholic High School =

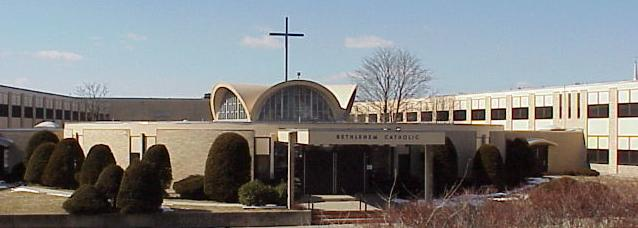
- Bethlehem Catholic High School in March 2007

Location
- 2133 Madison Avenue; Bethlehem, Pennsylvania 18017; United States; 40°38′31″N 75°22′18″W

Information
- Type: Private, coeducational high school
- Religious affiliation: Roman Catholic
- Established: 1925; 101 years ago
- Oversight: Diocese of Allentown
- Principal: Dean Donaher
- Staff: 37.0 (on an FTE basis)
- Grades: 9th–12th
- Enrollment: 500 (as of 2024)
- Student to teacher ratio: 15.1
- Campus type: Small city
- Colors: Brown and gold
- Athletics conference: Eastern Pennsylvania Conference
- Nickname: Golden Hawks
- Rival: Allentown Central Catholic High School and Liberty High School
- Newspaper: The Hawk
- Yearbook: Sceptre
- School fees: $1,200
- Tuition: $9,000
- Website: becahi.org

Bethlehem Catholic High School, more commonly referred to as Becahi or just Beca, is a parochial high school located in Bethlehem, Pennsylvania. The school is within the Diocese of Allentown and is located at 2133 Madison Avenue in Bethlehem in the Lehigh Valley region of eastern Pennsylvania.

As of 2024, according to the school's official website, the school has approximately 500 students.

== History ==
In 1925, Cardinal Dennis Dougherty and Hugh L. Lamb, the Superintendent of the Schools of the Roman Catholic Archdiocese of Philadelphia, recognized the need for a dedicated Catholic high school in South Bethlehem due to the large amount of Catholic emigration to the region. Holy Infancy Parish located on 4th Street was the initial school building, and their pastor, Charles Bowles, was named the first superintendent.

The following year, in the Spring of 1926, Bethlehem Catholic High School opened its doors.

Bowles was able to raise $50,537 (Note: $891,769.62 adjusted for inflation c.2024) within a month, allowing for a formal dedication on August 24, 1926. By the end of the year the school was accredited to offer a full four year education. By 1927, the school published the first edition of its yearbook the Brown and Gold with most students being the first in their families to attend four years of high-school. Since the school opened it was staffed with Sisters of St. Joseph, and by 1934, through a competition in a local newspaper, the nickname BecaHi was adopted.

In February 1961, the Archdiocese of Philadelphia was subdivided with Bethlehem falling in the new Diocese of Allentown. One of the first acts by the diocese's first Bishop, Joseph McShea, was to expand the school, authorizing the construction of a new, larger, school on the north side of Bethlehem on Dewberry Road, which opened its doors in 1964, with classes being split between the two schools until 1969 when the south side campus was turned into the Holy Infancy Elementary School. In 1971, BecaHi became co-educational. Prior to this, the school was split into a "boys wing" and a "girls wing." In 1973, the school hired its first lay principal, Richard Culver.

== Athletics ==
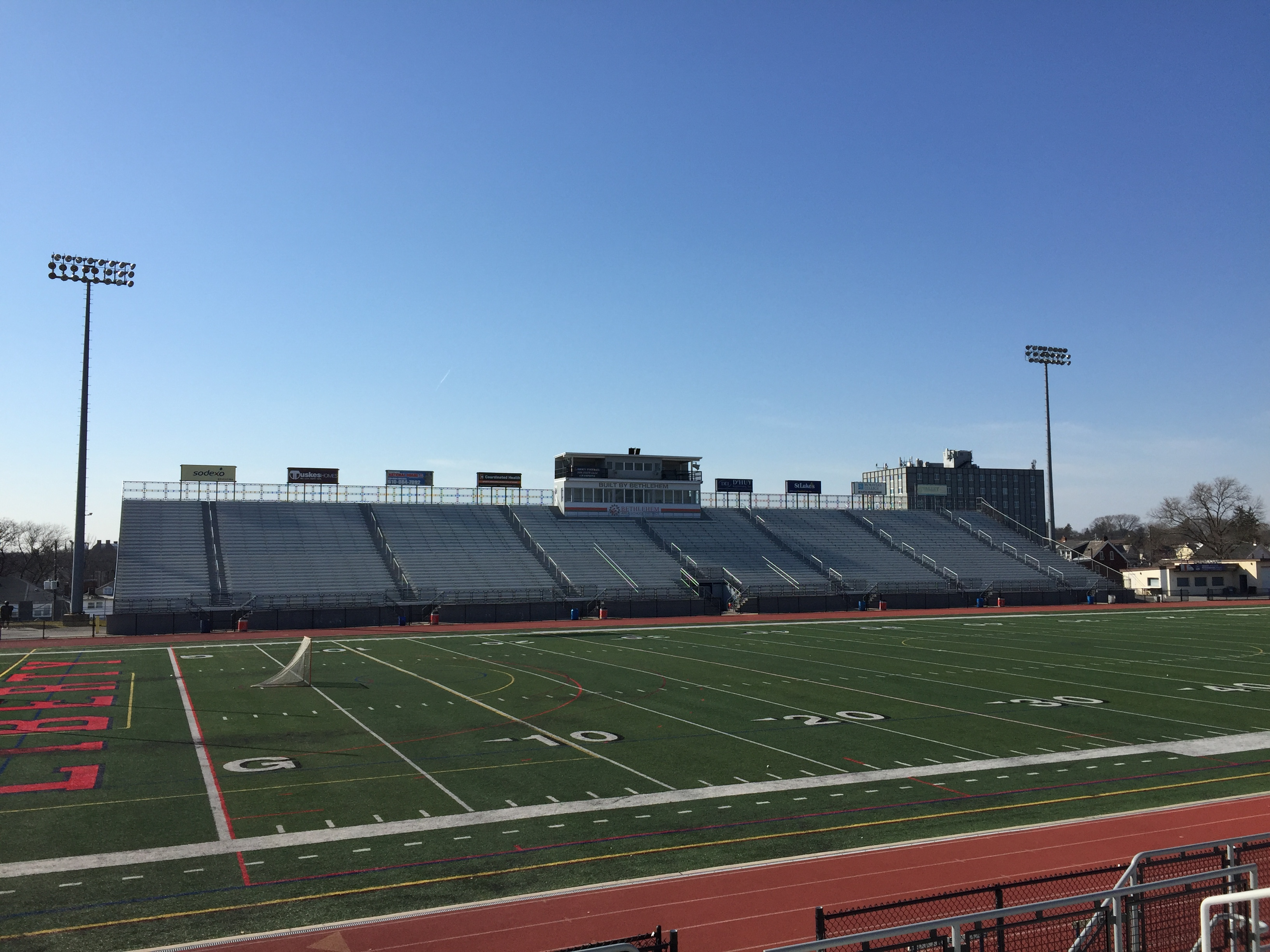
Bethlehem Catholic High School's football team plays their home games at BASD Stadium, a 16,000 capacity stadium in Bethlehem that is one of Pennsylvania's largest high school stadiums

Bethlehem Catholic High School competes athletically in the Eastern Pennsylvania Conference (EPC) in the District XI division of the Pennsylvania Interscholastic Athletic Association, one of the premier high school athletic divisions in the nation. Home athletic events are held on the campus of Bethlehem Catholic High School while football games are played at the 14,000 capacity Frank Banko Field at Bethlehem Area School District Stadium, one of Pennsylvania's largest high school stadiums.

=== State championships ===
Boys basketball

- 1960 PCIAA Class B State Champions
- 1962 PCIAA Class B State Champions

Girls basketball

- 1993 Class AAA runner-up (North Catholic 62–42)
- 2013 Class AAA runner-up (South Park 53–38)
- 2017 Class AAAA State Champions (Villa Maria 46–27)
- 2019 Class AAAA State Champions (North Catholic 49–60)

Football: Pennsylvania state champions, first two-time champion in PIAA football championship history.

- 1988 Class AA champions (inaugural year of State playoffs)
- 1990 Class AAA champions

Softball

- 2009 Class AAA State runner-up (9 innings 1–0)
- 2014 Class AAA State runner-up
- 2015 Class AAA State Champions

Track and Field

- 2002 Class AA State Boys Team runner-up
- 2003 Class AA State Boys Team Champions

Boys volleyball

- 2012 Class AA State Champions

Girls volleyball

- 2014 Class AA State Champions

Wrestling: Individual championships

- 2011 Class AA State Dual Meet Champions - Ranked #15 nationally by WIN Magazine.
- 2012 Class AA State Dual Meet Champions - Ranked #12 nationally by Inter-Mat.
- 2013 Class AA State Dual Meet Champions
- 2014 Class AA State Dual Meet Champions
- 2016 Class AAA State Dual Meet Champions
- 2017 Class AAA State Dual Meet Runner-up

Wrestling: Team championships

- 1979 Class AAA State Team Champions (2 State Champions)
- 2012 Class AA State Team Champions (3 State Champions & 1 runner-up)
- 2013 Class AA State Team Champions (1 State Champion & 1 runner-up)
- 2014 Class AA State Team Champions (3 State Champions & 1 runner-up)

== Notable alumni ==
- Richard Fuisz, physician and inventor
- Mike Guman, former professional football player, Los Angeles Rams
- Dan Kendra, former Florida State quarterback
- Joe Kovacs, three-time Olympic silver medalist and world champion in shot put
- Sean Leary, college baseball coach, Lehigh Mountain Hawks
- Zach Makovsky, former professional mixed martial arts fighter, Ultimate Fighting Championship
- Jim Molinaro, former professional football player, Dallas Cowboys and Washington Redskins
- Daniel Roebuck, film and television actor, Lost, Matlock, and The Fugitive
- John Spagnola, former professional football player, Green Bay Packers, Philadelphia Eagles, and Seattle Seahawks

== Notable faculty ==
- James McConlogue, former head football coach, Lafayette College
