= Karen Marrongelle =

American mathematician

Karen Ann Marrongelle is an American mathematics educator and specialist in collaborative learning in mathematics. In 2018, she was appointed head of the Directorate for Education and Human Resources at the National Science Foundation. She previously was the dean of the College of Liberal Arts and Sciences at Portland State University.

== Early life and education ==
Marrongelle attended Allentown Central Catholic High School in Allentown, Pennsylvania, and then Albright College in Reading, Pennsylvania, where she majored in mathematics and also served on the executive board of Albright's radio station, WXAC, and graduated in 1995. After earning a master's degree in mathematics at Lehigh University in Bethlehem, Pennsylvania, in 1997, she completed her doctorate in mathematics education at the University of New Hampshire in Durham, New Hampshire, where her dissertation was Physics experiences and calculus: How students use physics to construct meaningful conceptualizations of calculus concepts in an interdisciplinary calculus/physics course.

== Career ==
In 2001, Marrongelle became a faculty member in the department of mathematics and statistics at Portland State University. She took a leave from Portland State to work at the National Science Foundation from 2007 to 2009. At Portland State, she was assistant vice chancellor for academic standards, vice chancellor for academic strategies, and interim dean of liberal arts and sciences. In 2015, she was appointed dean. As dean, she led a proposal to eliminate Portland State's language programs in Ancient Greek, Swahili, Korean, and Vietnamese.

== Publications ==
With Ping Li, Marrongelle is the author of the book Having Success with NSF: A Practical Guide, published by Wiley in 2013. In 2015, Marongelle became one of the three founding editors-in-chief of the Springer mathematics education journal International Journal of Research in Undergraduate Mathematics Education, a post she held until 2019.
