= Allentown Central Catholic High School =

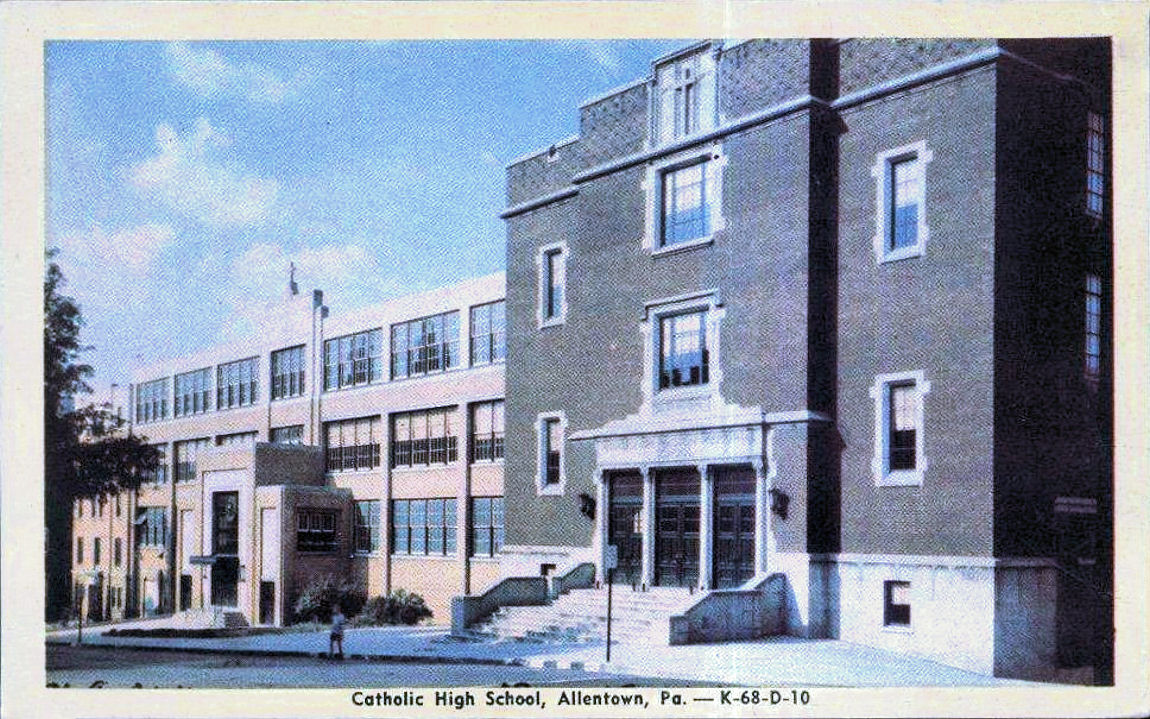
- Allentown Central Catholic High School

Location
- 301 N. 4th Street; Allentown, Pennsylvania 18102; United States; 40°36′30″N 75°28′2″W

Information
- Type: Private, Coeducational
- Religious affiliation: Catholic
- Established: 1926; 100 years ago
- Principal: Liam Farrell
- Faculty: 48.5 (on an FTE basis)
- Grades: 9th–12th
- Enrollment: 627 (2023–24)
- Student to teacher ratio: 12.9
- Campus type: Midsize city
- Colors: Green and gold
- Athletics conference: Eastern Pennsylvania Conference
- Mascot: Vikings and Vikettes
- Nickname: CCHS/ACCHS
- Rival: Bethlehem Catholic High School
- Accreditation: Middle States Association of Colleges and Schools
- Affiliation: National Catholic Educational Association
- Athletic Director: Ryan Rooney
- Website: www.acchs.info

Allentown Central Catholic High School (ACCHS), often referred to as Central Catholic or Central, is a private, parochial school located at 301 N. 4th Street in Allentown, Pennsylvania. The school is managed by the Diocese of Allentown, and predominantly serves students from the Lehigh Valley region of eastern Pennsylvania.

As of the 2023–24 school year, Allentown Central Catholic had a student enrollment of 627 students and 48.5 classroom teachers (on an FTE basis) for a student–teacher ratio of 12.9, according to National Center for Education Statistics data.

== History ==
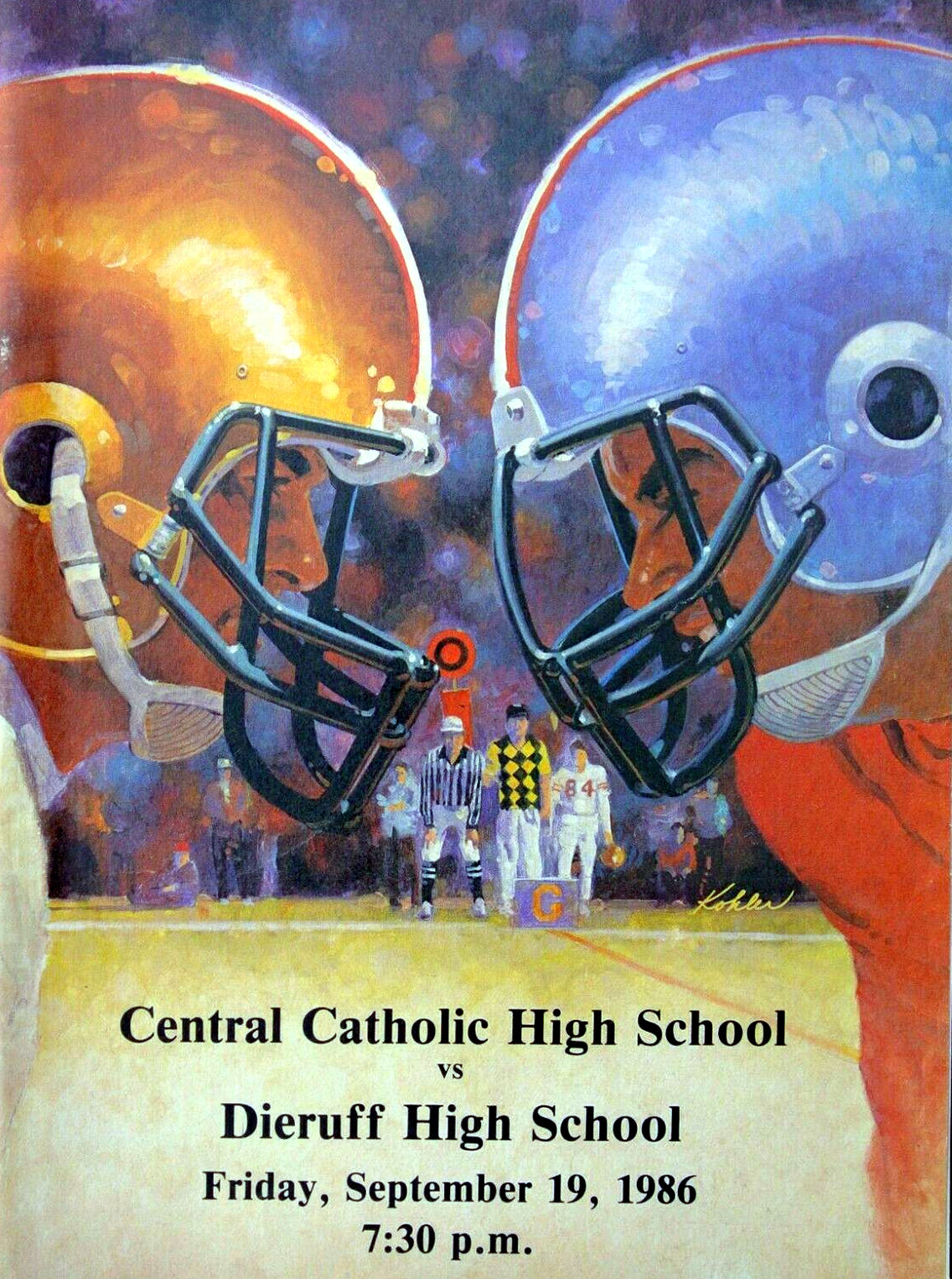
The football program for Allentown Central Catholic's September 19, 1986 game against Dieruff High School at J. Birney Crum Stadium in Allentown

The school was founded as Masson Memorial School in 1926 by Rev. Leo Gregory Fink, then rector of Sacred Heart Parish. The school was named in honor of Msgr. Peter Masson, Fink's predecessor at Sacred Heart. The cornerstone of the new school's first new building was laid in March 1927. The building, now known as Masson Hall, was constructed on the corner of 4th and Chew Streets in Allentown.

As the school grew, new buildings were added. Rockne Hall, the school's indoor sports gymnasium, was constructed in 1940 and named in honor of former Notre Dame football coach Knute Rockne. Commodore Barry Hall, named after American Revolutionary War naval hero Commodore John Barry, was built in 1964. Other buildings, including parts of the Sacred Heart School building, were used by the school during the second half of the 20th century.

== Academics ==
Allentown Central Catholic High School is a multiple winner of the Blue Ribbon Award, awarded by the U.S. Department of Education.

== Athletics ==
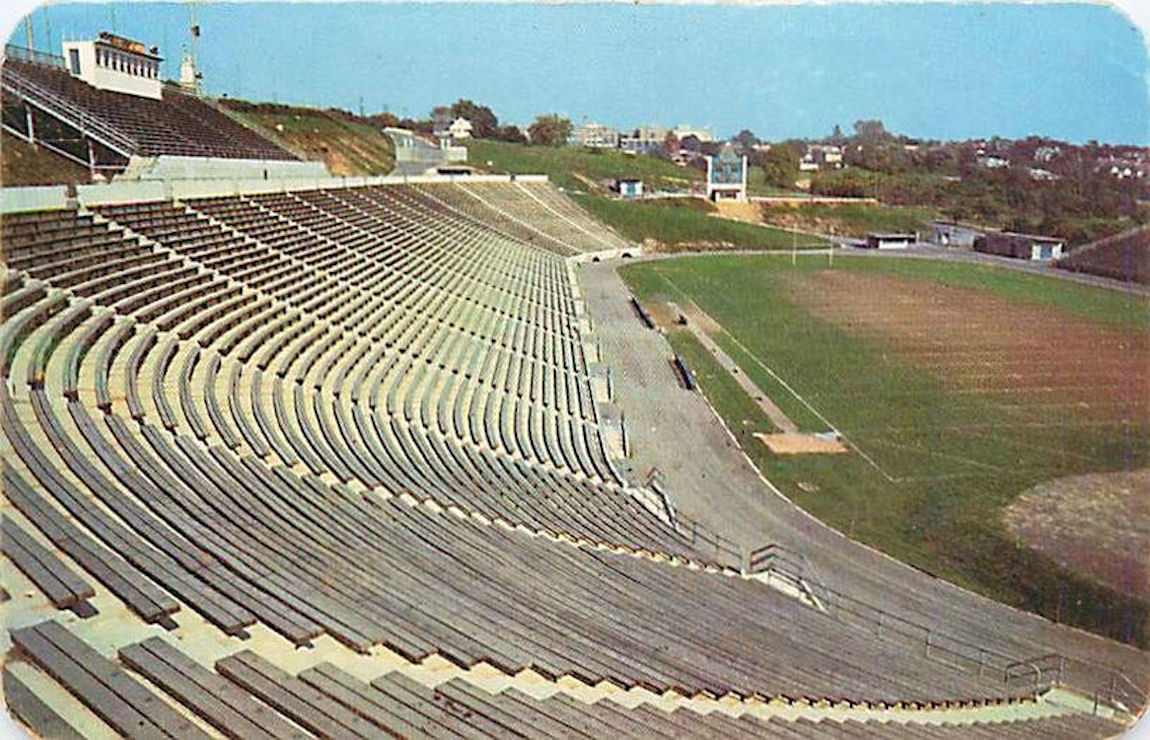
J. Birney Crum Stadium in Allentown, the largest high school football stadium in the Mid-Atlantic U.S. and home field for Allentown Central Catholic High School's football team

Allentown Central Catholic competes athletically in the Eastern Pennsylvania Conference (EPC) in the District XI division of the Pennsylvania Interscholastic Athletic Association (PIAA), one of the premier high school athletic divisions in the nation. Previously, from 2002 to 2014, the school competed in the Lehigh Valley Conference.

Allentown Central Catholic holds the fourth-most Lehigh Valley Conference championships in all sports behind Parkland High School, Emmaus High School, and Easton Area High School. Central Catholic holds the record for the most Lehigh Valley Conference championships in girls' basketball, girls' cross country, and girls' volleyball.

=== Stadium and arena ===
CCHS plays its home football and some of its soccer games at J. Birney Crum Stadium, a 15,000 capacity stadium and the largest high school football stadium in the Mid-Atlantic, located on Linden Street between 20th and 22nd streets in Allentown.

The school plays the majority of its indoor sporting events, including basketball and wrestling, in Rockne Hall, the school's historic indoor sporting facility, which was named in 1941 for former Notre Dame head football coach Knute Rockne, whose life was cut short at 43 in a 1931 plane crash.

=== Boys' lacrosse ===
The school's boys' lacrosse team won the PIAA 2A State Championship in 2021.

=== Football ===
The school's football team has won three PIAA state championships (1993, 1998, and 2010).

=== Basketball ===
The CCHS girls' basketball team has won seven PIAA state championships, in 1973, 1978, 1987, and four in a row from 2001 through 2004. The boys' basketball team has won three PIAA state championships, in 1984, 1986, and 2021.

=== Girls' volleyball and cross country ===
In 2001–2002, both the girls' volleyball and girls' cross country running teams were Pennsylvania state champions. Additionally, in 2007, 2008, and 2016 the girls' volleyball team won the AAA state championship.

=== Ice hockey ===
CCHS is one of eleven Lehigh Valley-area high schools with an ice hockey team; the team is a member of the Lehigh Valley Scholastic Ice Hockey League.

=== Baseball ===
The CCHS baseball team has yet to capture a championship in the school’s history. The team recently lost in the EPC Semifinals to William Allen High School. They have lost in brutal fashion like in 2024 on a walkoff grandslam to Salisbury. The team led Notre Dame Green-Pond 7-0 and let up an eight run inning due to many errors.

== Notable alumni ==
- Muhammad-Ali Abdur-Rahkman, professional basketball player, Universo Treviso Basket
- Lillian Briggs, former female rock musician known as "The Queen of Rock and Roll"
- Walt Groller, former Grammy-nominated polka musician
- Tim Heidecker, comedian, writer, director, actor, and musician, Bridesmaids, Vacation, Ant-Man and the Wasp
- George Kinek, former professional football player, Chicago Cardinals
- Gina Lewandowski, former professional women's soccer player, NJ/NY Gotham FC
- Patrick Maggitti, first provost, Villanova University, and former dean, Villanova School of Business
- Meredith Marakovits, New York Yankees reporter, YES Network
- Michelle M. Marciniak, former women's basketball coach, South Carolina Gamecocks women's basketball, and former professional basketball player, WNBA's Portland Fire and Seattle Storm
- Karen Marrongelle, chief operating officer, National Science Foundation
- David Mayernik, architect and artist.
- Billy McCaffrey, former college basketball coach, St. Bonaventure University
- Ed McCaffrey, former professional football player, New York Giants, San Francisco 49ers, and Denver Broncos
- Joe McHugh, former WWE professional wrestling announcer
- Jeff Mutis, former professional baseball player, Cleveland Indians and Florida Marlins
- Andrew Pataki, former Eastern Catholic hierarch, second bishop of Parma for the Byzantines, and third bishop of Passaic for the Byzantines
- Jennifer Sey, artistic gymnast
- Tony Stewart, former professional football player, Cincinnati Bengals, Oakland Raiders, and Philadelphia Eagles
- Christine Taylor, actress and wife of actor Ben Stiller
- Stephanie Woodling, opera singer, Deutsche Oper am Rhein

== Notable faculty ==
- John Birmelin, former Pennsylvania German poet and playwright
- Joe Bottiglieri, collegiate football coach, Moravian University
- Leo Crowe, former professional basketball player, Indianapolis Kautskys
- James McConlogue, former head football coach, Lafayette College
