= Jim Molinaro =

American football player (born 1981)

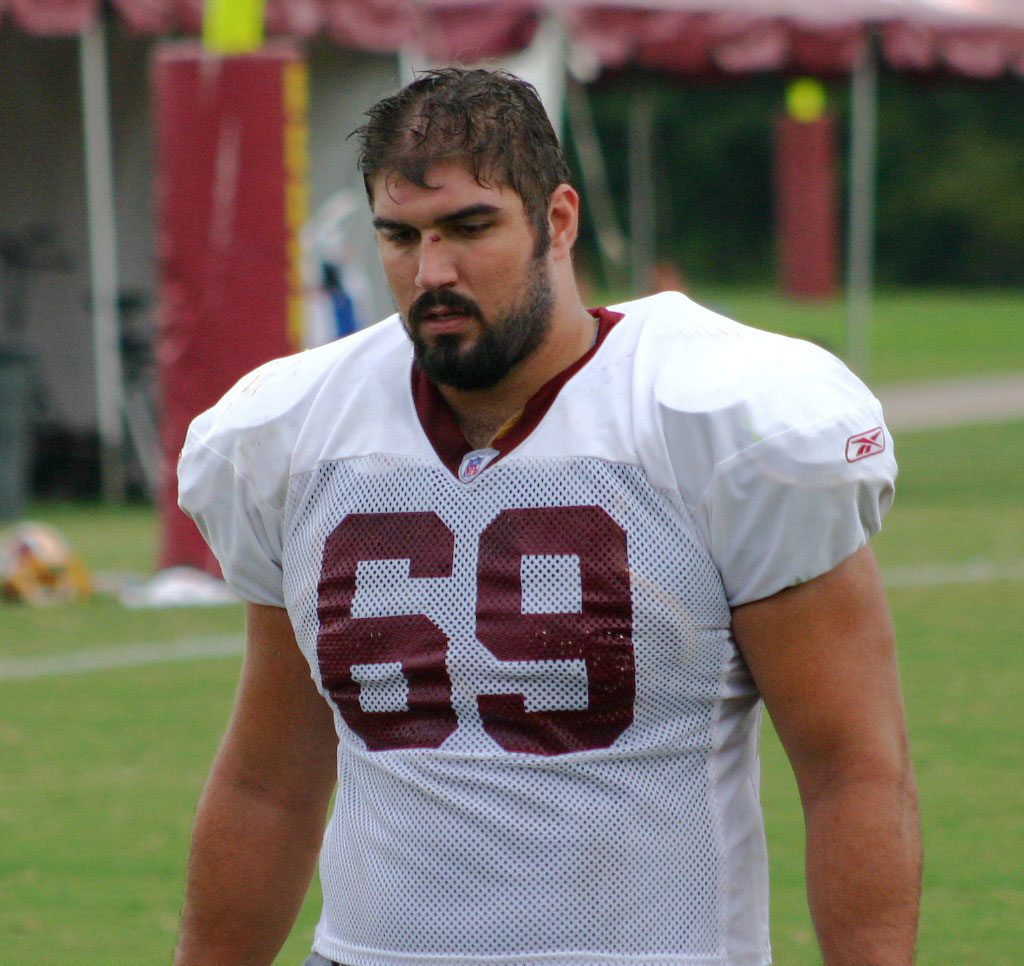
- Molinaro at Redskins training camp

No. 69
- Position: Offensive tackle

Personal information
- Born: April 27, 1981 (age 45); Hatfield, Pennsylvania, U.S.
- Listed height: 6 ft 7 in (2.01 m)
- Listed weight: 345 lb (156 kg)

Career information
- High school: Bethlehem Catholic (Bethlehem, Pennsylvania)
- College: Notre Dame
- NFL draft: 2004: 6th round, 180th overall pick

Career history
- Washington Redskins (2004–2006); Dallas Cowboys (2007)*
- * Offseason or practice squad member only

Career NFL statistics
- Games played: 15
- Stats at Pro Football Reference

James Anthony Molinaro (born April 27, 1981) is an American former professional football player who was an offensive tackle in the National Football League (NFL). He was selected by the Washington Redskins in the 2004 NFL draft in the sixth round with the 180th overall pick. He played college football for the Notre Dame Fighting Irish.

== Early life and education ==
Molinaro was born in Hatfield, Pennsylvania, on April 27, 1981. He attended Bethlehem Catholic High School in Bethlehem, Pennsylvania, where he was a USA Today "Honorable Mention All-American" and a "First-team Associated Press Big School All-State" selection in 1997 and again in 1998 during his junior and senior years. In 1997, he was one of five finalists for the "Pennsylvania Lineman of the Year Award", posting 46 tackles, 17 of them solo, 12.5 sacks, four tackles for losses, 15 forced passes, and one batted pass during the season.

During his senior year at Bethlehem Catholic in 1998, Molinaro recorded 18 solo tackles, 29 assists, 11.5 sacks, 8 forced passes, and 4 batted passes, helping lead Bethlehem Catholic to a 7–4 record in the Eastern Pennsylvania Conference, one of the nation's most competitive high school divisions. Molinaro was a three-year starter for Bethlehem Catholic, earning four letters in football as an offensive and defensive tackle.

== College career ==
Molinaro was recruited out of Bethlehem Catholic High School by Notre Dame. After redshirting his first season, he played as a reserve defensive tackle in 2000, recording one solo tackle. In 2001, he appeared in six games, primarily on special teams, while making his first career start at right tackle against Navy. Following his sophomore season, Molinaro transitioned from defensive tackle to offensive tackle. In 2002, he appeared in every game and made two starts, before earning the starting left tackle position for the final three games of the season after injuries along the offensive line.

As a senior in 2003, Molinaro started every game at left tackle and was selected as a game captain eight times under Notre Dame's game-by-game captain rotation, reflecting his leadership on one of the team's most experienced position groups. He graded 83.1 percent for blocking consistency and recorded 104 knockdown blocks while helping anchor an offensive line that paved the way for running back Julius Jones to set Notre Dame's single-game rushing record with 262 rushing yards against Pittsburgh Panthers football. Following his senior season, Molinaro was named an "All-Independent" selection and a "Super Sleeper" by The NFL Draft Report.

== Professional career ==
=== Washington Redskins ===
Molinaro entered the 2004 NFL draft and was selected in the sixth round, with the 180th overall selection, by the Washington Redskins. With the Redskins, he appeared in 24 games in his first two NFL seasons (2004 and 2005). In 2005, he helped lead the Redskins to their first NFL playoff appearance since 1999.

=== Dallas Cowboys ===
On March 21, 2007, he signed with the Dallas Cowboys.

== Post-NFL career ==
Molinaro is active in commercial, industrial, and retail real estate development. In 2015, he was nominated for the “40 under 40” list in the Piedmont Triad region of North Carolina.

In 2013, he married his wife Erin with whom he has a son, James Anthony Molinaro III (born in 2016). They reside in Summerfield, North Carolina.
