= Leo Crowe =

American basketball player

Personal information
- Born: April 2, 1912 Lafayette, Indiana, U.S.
- Died: April 24, 1966 (aged 54) Newport, Rhode Island, U.S.
- Listed height: 5 ft 11 in (1.80 m)
- Listed weight: 170 lb (77 kg)

Career information
- College: Notre Dame (1931–1934)
- Playing career: 1934–1939
- Position: Guard
- Coaching career: 1940–1959

Career history

Playing
- 1934–1936: Akron Goodyear
- 1935–1936, 1937: Indianapolis Kautskys
- 1937–1938: Reeves All-Stars
- 1938: Hilgemeier Packers
- 1938–1939: College All-Stars

Coaching
- 1940–1942: Huntington Catholic HS
- 1944–1947: Allentown Central Catholic HS
- 1950–1959: Rogers HS

Leo Jerome Crowe (April 2, 1912 – April 24, 1966) was an American professional basketball player. He played in the National Basketball League for the Indianapolis Kautskys and averaged 6.2 points per game.

He was also a long-time high school basketball coach spanning tenures in Indiana, Pennsylvania, and Rhode Island. In 1940–41, Crowe led Huntington (IN) Catholic High School to a state championship, then as state runners-up the following the season. He led Rogers High School to a Rhode Island state championship in 1952.

Crowe died in 1966 in Newport, Rhode Island from a heart attack.
