= Dan Kendra =

American football player (born 1976)

No. 10
- Position: Quarterback / Fullback

Personal information
- Born: March 15, 1976 (age 50); Morgantown, West Virginia, U.S.
- Listed height: 6 ft 2 in (1.88 m)
- Listed weight: 255 lb (116 kg)

Career information
- High school: Bethlehem (PA) Catholic
- College: Florida State
- NFL draft: 2000: undrafted

Awards and highlights
- BCS national champion (1999)

Dan Kendra III (born March 15, 1976) is an American former football player.

== Early life ==
Kendra was born on March 15, 1976, in Morgantown, West Virginia. He played high school football at Bethlehem Catholic High School in the Eastern Pennsylvania Conference, where he was a highly touted Parade All-American and 1995 National Offensive Player of the Year.

== College football career ==
In 1995, Kendra chose to play for coach Bobby Bowden (whom had also coached his father) at Florida State over Penn State.

After two years behind Thad Busby, Kendra was scheduled to take over for the Seminoles' starting quarterback for the Seminoles' 1998 season prior to tearing the PCL in his right knee during spring practice in April, which elevated Chris Weinke as the team's starting quarterback for the season.
