= Ping Li (psychologist) =

Ping Li (Chinese: 李平; pinyin: Lǐ Píng) is currently Sin Wai Kin Professor in Humanities and Technology, Chair Professor of Neurolinguistics and Bilingual Studies, and Dean of the Faculty of Humanities at the Hong Kong Polytechnic University (PolyU). Prior to joining PolyU, he was a Professor of Psychology, Linguistics, and Information Sciences and Technology, and Associate Director of the Institute for Computational and Data Sciences at Pennsylvania State University. His research interests are in language acquisition, bilingualism, and reading comprehension in both children and adults. He uses digital technologies and cognitive neuroscience methods to study neuroplasticity and individual differences in learning, so as to understand the relationships among languages, cultures, technology, and the brain. Li received a B.A. in Chinese linguistics from Peking University in 1983, an M.A. in theoretical linguistics from Peking University, a Ph.D. in psycholinguistics from Leiden University and the Max Planck Institute for Psycholinguistics in 1990, and completed post-doctoral fellowships at the Center for Research in Language at the University of California, San Diego and the McDonnell-Pew Center for Research in Cognitive Neuroscience in 1992. Li has been employed at the Chinese University of Hong Kong (1992–1996), the University of Richmond (1996–2006), and Pennsylvania State University (2008–2019), and he has also served as Program Director for the Perception, Action, and Cognition Program and the Cognitive Neuroscience Program at the National Science Foundation (2007–2009). Li was also President of the Society for Computation in Psychology and is currently Editor of Brain and Language, Elsevier and Senior Editor of Cognitive Science, Wiley. He is an elected Fellow of the American Association for the Advancement of Science (AAAS).

== Selected publications ==
- Yu, S., Gu, C., Huang, K., and Li, Ping (2024). Predicting the next sentence (not word) in large language models: What model-brain alignment tells us about discourse comprehension. Science Advances, 1-12. https://www.science.org/doi/10.1126/sciadv.adn7744
- Gu, C., Peng, Y., Nastase, S. A., Mayer, R. E., and Li, Ping (2024). Onscreen presence of instructors in video lectures affects learners’ neural synchrony and visual attention during multimedia learning. Proceedings of the National Academy of Sciences, 121(12), e2309054121.
- Li, Ping and Xu, Qihui (2022). Computational modeling of bilingual language learning: Current models and future directions. Language Learning, 73, 17-64. https://doi.org/10.1111/lang.12529
- Li, P., & Lan, Y.J. (2022). Digital language learning (DLL): Insights from behavior, cognition, and the brain. Bilingualism: Language and Cognition, 25, 361-378. https://doi.org/10.1017/S1366728921000353
- MacWhinney, B., Kempe, V., Li, Ping, and Brooks, P. (2022). Emergentist approaches to language. Frontiers in Psychology. doi: 10.3389/978-2-88974-483-1
- Li, Ping and Jeong, H. (2020). The social brain of language: Grounding second language learning in social interaction. npj Science of Learning, 1-9. doi:10.1038/s41539-020-0068-7
- Li, Ping and Dong, Y. (2020). Language experience and cognitive control: A dynamic perspective. Psychology of Learning and Motivation, 72, 27-52.
- Li, Ping and Clariana, R. (2019). Reading comprehension in L1 and L2: An integrative approach. Journal of Neurolinguistics, 50, 94-105.
- Li, Ping, Zhang, F., Yu, A., and Zhao, X. (2020). Language History Questionnaire (LHQ3): An enhanced tool for assessing multilingual experience. Bilingualism: Language and Cognition, 23, 938-944. doi: 10.1017/S1366728918001153.
- Li, Ping and Zhao, X. (2018). Computational modeling. In de Groot, A.M.B, & Hagoort, P. (Eds.), Research methods in psycholinguistics and the neurobiology of language: A practical guide (pp. 208–229). Hoboken, NJ: John Wiley & Sons, Inc.
- Li, Ping (2013). Computational modeling of bilingualism. A special issue of Bilingualism: Language and Cognition, 16(2), 241-366.
- Li, Ping and Shirai, Yashuhiro (2000). The acquisition of lexical and grammatical aspect. Berlin: Mouton de Gruyter.
- Klein, W. and Li, Ping (2009). The expression of time. Berlin: Mouton de Gruyter.
- Li, Ping and Marrongelle, Karen (2013). Having Success with NSF: A Practical Guide. New York: Wiley.
- Grosjean, F. and Li, Ping (2013). The psycholinguistics of bilingualism. New York: Wiley.
