= Joe Bottiglieri =

American football coach

Biographical details
- Education: Bloomsburg (1971); Indiana State (1974)

Coaching career (HC unless noted)
- 1973–1977: Lafayette (LB/freshman)
- 1978–1982: Mansfield
- 1986–1989: Shippensburg
- 1990: William & Mary (LB)
- 1991–1995: William & Mary (DC)
- 1996–1997: Rhode Island (DC)
- 1998–1999: Lehigh (LB/DC)
- 2000: Allentown Central Catholic HS (PA)
- 2001–2011: Emmaus HS (PA)
- 2013–2017: Lehigh (ILB)
- 2018–2020: Wesley (DC)
- 2022: Alvernia (co-DC/LB)
- 2023: Moravian (LB)
- 2024–?: Liberty HS (PA) (DC)

Head coaching record
- Overall: 28–58–3 (college)

Accomplishments and honors

Championships
- 1 PSAC West Division (1988)

Joe Bottiglieri is an American football coach. Bottiglieri served as the head football coach at Mansfield University of Pennsylvania from 1978 to 1982 and Shippensburg University of Pennsylvania from 1986 to 1989. Bottiglieri was the defensive coordinator at Wesley University in Dover, Delaware from 2018 to 2020.

== Head coaching record ==
=== College ===
Year	Team	Overall	Conference	Standing	Bowl/playoffs
Mansfield Mountaineers (Pennsylvania State Athletic Conference) (1978–1982)
1978	Mansfield	2–8	0–5	6th (East)	
1979	Mansfield	0–9	0–5	6th (East)	
1980	Mansfield	2–7	1–4	T–4th (East)	
1981	Mansfield	4–6	3–2	T–3rd (East)	
1982	Mansfield	2–6–2	1–3–1	5th (East)	
Mansfield:		10–36–2	5–19–1		
Shippensburg Red Raiders (Pennsylvania State Athletic Conference) (1986–1989)
1986	Shippensburg	3–7	2–4	T–5th (West)	
1987	Shippensburg	4–6	3–3	T–3rd (West)	
1988	Shippensburg	6–4	5–1	1st (West)	
1989	Shippensburg	5–5–1	1–4–1	6th (West)	
Shippensburg:		18–22–1	11–12–1		
Total:		28–58–3			
National championship Conference title Conference division title or championship game berth
