= Joe McHugh (announcer) =

American ring announcer (1904–1993)

Joseph P. McHugh (April 30, 1904 – January 31, 1993) was an American ring announcer. He announced boxing and wrestling matches in Allentown, Pennsylvania, from the 1920s through the 1980s and gained national exposure on WWWF and WWF programming in the 1970s and 1980s.

== Early life and education ==
McHugh was born on April 30, 1904, in Allentown, Pennsylvania, one of six sons born to Owen E. and Bridget (Brown) McHugh. One of his brothers was Terry McHugh, a boxer who fought bantamweight champion Pete Herman in 1919. He grew up on Gordon Street in the Irish section of Allentown's Sixth Ward and graduated from Allentown Central Catholic High School.

== Career ==
When he was 16 years old, McHugh went into vaudeville. He performed across the United States as a comedian and an emcee. After vaudeville, McHugh worked as an entertainment promoter in Lehigh Valley clubs. He was part owner of Club Rio, a nightclub located in South Whitehall Township. He also worked as a sales associate for Roy Eichelberger Roofing and Siding in Allentown until 1976. During World War II, McHugh served in the U.S. Army.

=== Ring announcing ===
By 1929, McHugh was a licensed ring announcer. He announced boxing and wrestling matches primarily in Allentown and the surrounding Lehigh Valley area during the region's heyday as a fight town. He was a ring announcer at other East Coast arenas. He announced fights featuring a number of notable boxers, including Rocky Marciano, Larry Holmes, Muhammad Ali, and Jack Sharkey. In 1977, Sports Illustrated described McHugh as a "Living Legend of the Ring".

In 1964, McHugh began announcing World Wide Wrestling Federation matches in Allentown. In 1977, the WWWF, later renamed the WWF, began holding television tapings at the Allentown Fairgrounds's Agricultural Hall, which gave McHugh national exposure. He would sometimes get applauded when he wrapped up his introductory spiel identifying various persons involved in the proceedings by saying "And my name is Joooooooooe McHugh!" WWF stopped taping in Allentown in 1984, but McHugh continued to announce regional wrestling shows until his death on January 31, 1993.

== Personal life ==
McHugh was married to Barbara M. Gorman. They had one daughter, also named Barbara.
