= John Spagnola =

American football player (born 1957)

No. 88, 89
- Position: Tight end

Personal information
- Born: August 1, 1957 (age 69); Bethlehem, Pennsylvania, U.S.
- Listed height: 6 ft 4 in (1.93 m)
- Listed weight: 240 lb (109 kg)

Career information
- High school: Bethlehem Catholic
- College: Yale
- NFL draft: 1979: 9th round, 245th overall pick

Career history
- New England Patriots (1979)*; Philadelphia Eagles (1979–1987); Seattle Seahawks (1988); Green Bay Packers (1989)
- * Offseason or practice squad member only

Awards and highlights
- First-team All-East (1978)

Career NFL statistics
- Receptions: 263
- Receiving yards: 2,886
- Receiving touchdowns: 15
- Stats at Pro Football Reference

John Stephen Spagnola (born August 1, 1957) is an American former professional football player who was a tight end in the National Football League (NFL) for the Philadelphia Eagles, Seattle Seahawks, and the Green Bay Packers. He played college football for the Yale Bulldogs.

== Early life and education ==
Spagnola was born in Bethlehem, Pennsylvania. As a Boy Scout at Notre Dame Elementary School, he was awarded the Eagle Scout rank, and was inducted into the Eagle Scout Hall of Fame.

=== High school career ===
He attended Bethlehem Catholic High School in Bethlehem, Pennsylvania, where he played wide receiver and linebacker. Bethlehem Catholic went 11-0-0 in 1974 with Spagnola as one of the team captains. He was a grade school and high school classmate of running back Mike Guman (Bethlehem Catholic, 1976), who later starred at Penn State and played 10 seasons in the National Football League with the Los Angeles Rams.

=== Collegiate career ===
After his 1975 graduation from Bethlehem Catholic, he attended Yale University, where he played wide receiver. He graduated in 1979 as the university's all-time leading wide receiver in receptions (88) and yards (1554). He was an honorable mention All-American tight end at Yale in 1979.

== Career ==
=== NFL career ===
Spagnola was selected in the ninth round of the 1979 NFL draft by the New England Patriots. He played in eleven NFL seasons from 1979 to 1987 for the Philadelphia Eagles, the 1988 for the Seattle Seahawks, and the 1989 for the Green Bay Packers.

Spagnola was voted the Eagles' MVP (offensive) in 1984. His best year in the NFL came during the 1985 season for the Philadelphia Eagles when he caught 65 receptions for 701 yards and five touchdowns. In 1985, Spagnola and Mike Quick combined to set two club records; most receptions by two players (135) and most combined receiving yards (2,019), breaking a record previously shared by Hall of Famer Tommy McDonald and Timmy Brown.

He was a pro-bowl alternative in 1985 and 1984. He caught more passes (129) than any other tight end in the National Football Conference in 1985 and 1984.

He appeared in Super Bowl XV for the Philadelphia Eagles versus the Oakland Raiders, catching one reception for 22 yards.

Spagnola ranks 14th on the Eagles' all-time reception list with 256 catches for 2,833 yards. His 12 catches in one game against the New Orleans Saints in 1985 were just two short of the club record shared by Brian Westbrook and Don Looney.

Spagnola served as a player representative of the National Football League Players Association (NFPLPA). During the labor strike in 1987, Spagnola's Philadelphia Eagles were the only NFL team whose players did not cross the strike line. Following his playing career, he served as the NFPLPA's first executive vice president.

During the 2008–2009 season, Spagnola was sought by the NFPLA's executive search firm to succeed Gene Upshaw as executive director. Spagnola remained in the running after the union pared its list of finalists to five.

=== Broadcasting career ===
Spagnola began broadcasting for ABC Sports television in 1991. He covered college football for the network as a color analyst, sideline reporter, and studio analyst through the 1998 season.

=== Business career ===
In 1984, Spagnola began his career in the financial services industry, working for First Boston Corporation in New York City and Philadelphia. During this time, Spagnola worked in institutional sales and trading where he developed an in depth knowledge of bank advisory institutional and corporate services.

In 1992, with Michael Cosack, he co-founded Spagnola-Cosack, Inc., an independent investment consulting firm that serviced public, Taft-Hartley, corporate, hospital, endowment, and foundation Funds. Over a ten-year period, assets under advisement grew to over $3.5 billion. In 2003, Spagnola-Cosack, Inc. was acquired by Public Financial Management Group, a Philadelphia financial advisory firm. He brings over 23 years of investment experience to PFM Advisors.

As managing director of PFM Advisors, Spagnola serves on the investment committee, oversees marketing and client service and consulting with public, hospital, endowment, and Taft-Hartley Fund clients of the firm.

=== Academia ===
Spagnola has taught a course on managing public funds for the Fels Institute of Government at the University of Pennsylvania.

=== Other ===
Spagnola currently serves on the board of directors of Magee Rehabilitation Hospital, the Buckley Institute at Yale University, and the Greater Philadelphia Chamber of Commerce. He also serves on the advisory committee of St. Rose of Lima Parish in West Philadelphia and on the investment committee of Jefferson Health in Philadelphia.

== Personal life ==
Spagnola has three daughters, Nicole, Megan, and Kelly.
