= Mike Guman =

American football player (born 1958)

No. 44
- Positions: Running back, fullback

Personal information
- Born: April 21, 1958 (age 68); Bethlehem, Pennsylvania, U.S.
- Listed height: 6 ft 2 in (1.88 m)
- Listed weight: 216 lb (98 kg)

Career information
- High school: Bethlehem Catholic
- College: Penn State (1976–1979)
- NFL draft: 1980: 6th round, 154th overall pick

Career history
- Los Angeles Rams (1980–1988)

Career NFL statistics
- Rushing yards: 1,286
- Rushing average: 3.8
- Receptions: 150
- Receiving yards: 1,433
- Touchdowns: 16
- Stats at Pro Football Reference

Michael Donald Guman (born April 21, 1958) is an American former professional football player who was a running back with the Los Angeles Rams of the National Football League (NFL) from 1980 to 1988. He played college football for the Penn State Nittany Lions.

== Early life and education ==
Guman was born in Bethlehem, Pennsylvania, on April 21, 1958. He was a running back at Bethlehem Catholic High School, where he was a high school teammate of John Spagnola, who also went on to an NFL career.

After graduating from Bethlehem Catholic High School, Guman attended Pennsylvania State University, where he played college football for the Nittany Lions.

On January 1, 1979, while playing for Penn State, he was on the receiving end of a goal line hit by Alabama linebacker Barry Krauss in the Sugar Bowl, which knocked the rivets on Krauss' helmet loose and caused Krauss to black out briefly. The hit was featured on the cover of Sports Illustrated the following week.

In 2006, ESPN.com ranked the play sixth on its list of the "100 Moments That Define College Football." The game, which was later ranked the "Greatest Bowl Game Ever" by ESPN.com, determined the NCAA national college football championship that year.

== Professional career ==
On April 30, 1980, Guman was selected by the defending NFC champion Los Angeles Rams in the sixth round (154th overall) of the 1980 NFL draft. His best season was 1981, during which, he rushed for 433 yards and 4 touchdowns, and had 18 catches for 130 yards. He was used mostly as a blocking fullback after the Rams drafted Eric Dickerson in 1983, a position he held for the rest of his career with the team.

== Personal life ==
Guman retired from football after the 1988 season. As of 2006 he resided in Allentown, Pennsylvania with his wife, Karen. They have five children, 4 of whom also attended Penn State. Guman's son Andrew was an Academic All-American football player at Penn State, under the same coach, Joe Paterno.

He is currently a Senior Advisor Consultant for Invesco. He still lends his name and image to local restaurants and non-profit groups in the Lehigh Valley area of Pennsylvania.
