= Stephanie Woodling =

American lyric mezzo-soprano

Stephanie Woodling is an American mezzo-soprano opera singer and actress with Deutsche Oper am Rhein in North Rhine-Westphalia, Germany.

She debuted with the company in 2004 in the opera house's production of Elektra. She has since performed in Das Rheingold in 2006, The Magic Flute in 2006, Tiefland in 2006, La clemenza di Tito in 2007, The Makropulos Affair in 2009, and The Gondoliers.

== Early life and education ==
Woodling was born and grew up in Allentown, Pennsylvania. She began her musical studies with the clarinet at age 10 and continued with voice, tenor saxophone, and sousaphone. She is a graduate of Allentown Central Catholic High School.

She holds both a bachelor's and a master's degree in music from Manhattan School of Music, where she was a recipient of the President's Award.

== Career ==
Woodling began her career at Santa Fe Opera in Santa Fe, New Mexico, where she was affiliated for two years. She debuted in Richard Strauss's Die ägyptische Helena. She made operatic debut was in George Frideric Handel's Lotario followed by Gioachino Rossini's Le comte Ory. Her orchestral debut was in Gustav Mahler's Lieder eines fahrenden Gesellen.

Woodling has since debuted with the National Symphony Orchestra at the John F. Kennedy Center for the Performing Arts in Washington, D.C., Pacific Symphony in Orange County, California, the Los Angeles Master Chorale in Los Angeles, and the Allentown Symphony Orchestra in her native Allentown, where she appeared in Felix Mendelssohn's A Midsummer Night's Dream and performed Solveig in Grieg's incidental music for Peer Gynt. Woodling is featured on Sony's live recording of Final Fantasy: More Friends, a concert for the video game series.

In 2008, she made her debut at the Baltimore Opera Company in Baltimore in the role of Stephano in Charles Gounod's Romeo et Juliette. With New York City Opera, Woodling has performed in A Little Night Music, Rigoletto, and La Traviata. She appeared as Donna Elvira in Don Giovanni, which a critic described as providing "an intellectual burst of animation into the proceedings, giving a charming, brash, and thorough reading."

Other Opera Pacific credits include Meg in Little Women, Flora, Mercedes in Carmen, Jade Boucher in Dead Man Walking, and Die zweite Dame in The Magic Flute.

Recent operatic debuts include the Lyric Opera in Kansas City as Stephano in Romeo and Juliet, the OK Mozart Festival as Ciesca in Gianni Schicchi, and Mrs. Segstrom in Los Angeles Opera's production of A Little Night Music.
