= List of United States representatives in the 82nd Congress =

This is a complete list of United States representatives during the 82nd United States Congress listed by seniority.

As an historical article, the districts and party affiliations listed reflect those during the 82nd Congress (January 3, 1951 – January 3, 1953). Seats and party affiliations on similar lists for other congresses will be different for certain members.

Seniority depends on the date on which members were sworn into office. Since many members are sworn in on the same day, subsequent ranking is based on previous congressional service of the individual and then by alphabetical order by the last name of the representative.

Committee chairmanship in the House is often associated with seniority. However, party leadership is typically not associated with seniority.

Note: The "*" indicates that the representative/delegate may have served one or more non-consecutive terms while in the House of Representatives of the United States Congress.

== U.S. House seniority list ==
U.S. House seniority
Rank	Representative	Party	District	Seniority date (Previous service, if any)	No.# of term(s)	Notes
1	Adolph J. Sabath	D	IL-07	March 4, 1907	23rd term	Dean of the House; Died on November 6, 1952.
2	Robert L. Doughton	D	NC-09	March 4, 1911	21st term	Became Dean of the House after Sabath died. Left the House in 1953.
3	Sam Rayburn	D	TX-04	March 4, 1913	20th term	Speaker of the House
4	Carl Vinson	D	GA-06	November 3, 1914	20th term	
5	Daniel A. Reed	R	NY-45	March 4, 1919	17th term	
6	John E. Rankin	D	MS-01	March 4, 1921	16th term	Left the House in 1953.
7	Roy O. Woodruff	R	MI-10	March 4, 1921; Previous service, 1913–1915.	17th term*	Left the House in 1953.
8	Clarence Cannon	D	MO-09	March 4, 1923	15th term	
9	Emanuel Celler	D	NY-15	March 4, 1923	15th term	
10	Robert Crosser	D	OH-21	March 4, 1923; Previous service, 1913–1919.	18th term*	
11	John Taber	R	NY-38	March 4, 1923	15th term	
12	John H. Kerr	D	NC-02	November 6, 1923	15th term	Left the House in 1953.
13	E. Eugene Cox	D	GA-02	March 4, 1925	14th term	Died on December 24, 1952.
14	Charles Aubrey Eaton	R	NJ-05	March 4, 1925	14th term	Left the House in 1953.
15	Thomas A. Jenkins	R	OH-10	March 4, 1925	14th term	
16	Joseph William Martin Jr.	R	MA-14	March 4, 1925	14th term	
17	Edith Nourse Rogers	R	MA-05	June 30, 1925	14th term	
18	Clifford R. Hope	R	KS-05	March 4, 1927	13th term	
19	Charles A. Wolverton	R	NJ-01	March 4, 1927	13th term	
20	John William McCormack	D	MA-12	November 6, 1928	13th term	
21	Richard B. Wigglesworth	R	MA-13	November 6, 1928	13th term	
22	Jere Cooper	D	TN-09	March 4, 1929	12th term	
23	Wright Patman	D	TX-01	March 4, 1929	12th term	
24	Howard W. Smith	D	VA-08	March 4, 1931	11th term	
25	Brent Spence	D	KY-05	March 4, 1931	11th term	
26	Jesse P. Wolcott	R	MI-07	March 4, 1931	11th term	
27	Leo E. Allen	R	IL-16	March 4, 1933	10th term	
28	William M. Colmer	D	MS-06	March 4, 1933	10th term	
29	John D. Dingell Sr.	D	MI-15	March 4, 1933	10th term	
30	George Anthony Dondero	R	MI-17	March 4, 1933	10th term	
31	John Kee	D	WV-05	March 4, 1933	10th term	Died on May 8, 1951.
32	James P. Richards	D	SC-05	March 4, 1933	10th term	
33	Francis E. Walter	D	PA-20	March 4, 1933	10th term	
34	Paul Brown	D	GA-10	July 5, 1933	10th term	
35	Harold D. Cooley	D	NC-04	July 7, 1934	10th term	
36	August H. Andresen	R	MN-01	January 3, 1935; Previous service, 1925–1933.	13th term*	
37	Leslie C. Arends	R	IL-17	January 3, 1935	9th term	
38	Graham A. Barden	D	NC-03	January 3, 1935	9th term	
39	Charles A. Buckley	D	NY-25	January 3, 1935	9th term	
40	W. Sterling Cole	R	NY-39	January 3, 1935	9th term	
41	Fred L. Crawford	R	MI-08	January 3, 1935	9th term	Left the House in 1953.
42	Edward J. Hart	D	NJ-14	January 3, 1935	9th term	
43	Clare Hoffman	R	MI-04	January 3, 1935	9th term	
44	Merlin Hull	R	WI-09	January 3, 1935; Previous service, 1929–1931.	10th term*	
45	George H. Mahon	D	TX-19	January 3, 1935	9th term	
46	Chauncey W. Reed	R	IL-14	January 3, 1935	9th term	
47	Dewey Jackson Short	R	MO-07	January 3, 1935; Previous service, 1929–1931.	10th term*	
48	Karl Stefan	R	NE-03	January 3, 1935	9th term	Died on October 2, 1951.
49	Charles A. Halleck	R	IN-02	January 29, 1935	9th term	
50	Frank W. Boykin	D	AL-01	July 30, 1935	9th term	
51	A. Leonard Allen	D	LA-08	January 3, 1937	8th term	Left the House in 1953.
52	Overton Brooks	D	LA-04	January 3, 1937	8th term	
53	William T. Byrne	D	NY-32	January 3, 1937	8th term	Died on January 27, 1952.
54	Herman P. Eberharter	D	PA-32	January 3, 1937	8th term	
55	Noble Jones Gregory	D	KY-01	January 3, 1937	8th term	
56	Eugene James Keogh	D	NY-09	January 3, 1937	8th term	
57	Michael J. Kirwan	D	OH-19	January 3, 1937	8th term	
58	Noah M. Mason	R	IL-15	January 3, 1937	8th term	
59	John R. Murdock	D	AZ-01	January 3, 1937	8th term	Left the House in 1953.
60	Edward Herbert Rees	R	KS-04	January 3, 1937	8th term	
61	Paul W. Shafer	R	MI-03	January 3, 1937	8th term	
62	Harry R. Sheppard	D	CA-21	January 3, 1937	8th term	
63	Donald Lawrence O'Toole	D	NY-13	January 3, 1937	8th term	Left the House in 1953.
64	William R. Poage	D	TX-11	January 3, 1937	8th term	
65	Albert Thomas	D	TX-08	January 3, 1937	8th term	
66	Richard M. Simpson	R	PA-17	May 11, 1937	8th term	
67	Ralph A. Gamble	R	NY-28	November 2, 1937	8th term	
68	Joe B. Bates	D	KY-08	June 4, 1938	8th term	Left the House in 1953.
69	George M. Grant	D	AL-02	June 14, 1938	8th term	
70	Herman Carl Andersen	R	MN-07	January 3, 1939	7th term	
71	Jack Z. Anderson	R	CA-08	January 3, 1939	7th term	Left the House in 1953.
72	Homer D. Angell	R	OR-03	January 3, 1939	7th term	
73	Lindley Beckworth	D	TX-03	January 3, 1939	7th term	Left the House in 1953.
74	William W. Blackney	R	MI-06	January 3, 1939; Previous service, 1935–1937.	8th term*	Left the House in 1953.
75	Clarence J. Brown	R	OH-07	January 3, 1939	7th term	
76	Joseph R. Bryson	D	SC-04	January 3, 1939	7th term	
77	Robert B. Chiperfield	R	IL-19	January 3, 1939	7th term	
78	Cliff Clevenger	R	OH-05	January 3, 1939	7th term	
79	Carl Curtis	R	NE-01	January 3, 1939	7th term	
80	Carl T. Durham	D	NC-06	January 3, 1939	7th term	
81	Charles H. Elston	R	OH-01	January 3, 1939	7th term	Left the House in 1953.
82	Ivor D. Fenton	R	PA-12	January 3, 1939	7th term	
83	Ezekiel C. Gathings	D	AR-01	January 3, 1939	7th term	
84	Ed Gossett	D	TX-13	January 3, 1939	7th term	Resigned on July 31, 1951.
85	Louis E. Graham	R	PA-25	January 3, 1939	7th term	
86	Leonard W. Hall	R	NY-02	January 3, 1939	7th term	Resigned on December 31, 1952.
87	John Carl Hinshaw	R	CA-20	January 3, 1939	7th term	
88	Ben F. Jensen	R	IA-07	January 3, 1939	7th term	
89	Robert Kean	R	NJ-12	January 3, 1939	7th term	
90	Paul J. Kilday	D	TX-20	January 3, 1939	7th term	
91	Karl M. LeCompte	R	IA-04	January 3, 1939	7th term	
92	Thomas E. Martin	R	IA-01	January 3, 1939	7th term	
93	John L. McMillan	D	SC-06	January 3, 1939	7th term	
94	Wilbur Mills	D	AR-02	January 3, 1939	7th term	
95	Reid F. Murray	R	WI-07	January 3, 1939	7th term	Died on April 29, 1952.
96	William F. Norrell	D	AR-06	January 3, 1939	7th term	
97	Henry O. Talle	R	IA-02	January 3, 1939	7th term	
98	John Martin Vorys	R	OH-12	January 3, 1939	7th term	
99	Lansdale Ghiselin Sasscer	D	MD-05	February 3, 1939	7th term	Left the House in 1953.
100	Albert Sidney Camp	D	GA-04	August 1, 1939	7th term	
101	Edwin Arthur Hall	R	NY-37	November 7, 1939	7th term	Left the House in 1953.
102	Clarence E. Kilburn	R	NY-34	February 13, 1940	7th term	
103	Clifford Davis	D	TN-10	February 14, 1940	7th term	
104	Frances P. Bolton	R	OH-22	February 27, 1940	7th term	
105	J. Harry McGregor	R	OH-17	February 27, 1940	7th term	
106	Herbert Covington Bonner	D	NC-01	November 5, 1940	7th term	
107	C. W. Bishop	R	IL-26	January 3, 1941	6th term	
108	Gordon Canfield	R	NJ-08	January 3, 1941	6th term	
109	Paul Cunningham	R	IA-05	January 3, 1941	6th term	
110	Frank Fellows	R	ME-03	January 3, 1941	6th term	Died on August 27, 1951.
111	Aime Forand	D	RI-01	January 3, 1941; Previous service, 1937–1939.	7th term*	
112	Walter K. Granger	D	UT-01	January 3, 1941	6th term	Left the House in 1953.
113	Oren Harris	D	AR-07	January 3, 1941	6th term	
114	Felix Edward Hébert	D	LA-01	January 3, 1941	6th term	
115	James J. Heffernan	D	NY-11	January 3, 1941	6th term	Left the House in 1953.
116	William S. Hill	R	CO-02	January 3, 1941	6th term	
117	Henry M. Jackson	D	WA-02	January 3, 1941	6th term	Left the House in 1953.
118	Augustine B. Kelley	D	PA-27	January 3, 1941	6th term	
119	Joseph O'Hara	R	MN-02	January 3, 1941	6th term	
120	Percy Priest	D	TN-06	January 3, 1941	6th term	
121	L. Mendel Rivers	D	SC-01	January 3, 1941	6th term	
122	Earl Wilson	R	IN-09	January 3, 1941	6th term	
123	Lawrence H. Smith	R	WI-01	August 29, 1941	6th term	
124	Wilson D. Gillette	R	PA-14	November 4, 1941	6th term	Died on August 7, 1951.
125	Jamie Whitten	D	MS-02	November 4, 1941	6th term	
126	Thomas J. Lane	D	MA-07	December 30, 1941	6th term	
127	Cecil R. King	D	CA-17	August 25, 1942	6th term	
128	Thomas Abernethy	D	MS-04	January 3, 1943	5th term	
129	James C. Auchincloss	R	NJ-03	January 3, 1943	5th term	
130	James Glenn Beall	R	MD-06	January 3, 1943	5th term	Left the House in 1953.
131	Walter E. Brehm	R	OH-11	January 3, 1943	5th term	Left the House in 1953.
132	William L. Dawson	D	IL-01	January 3, 1943	5th term	
133	Harris Ellsworth	R	OR-04	January 3, 1943	5th term	
134	Michael A. Feighan	D	OH-20	January 3, 1943	5th term	
135	Antonio M. Fernández	D	NM	January 3, 1943	5th term	
136	O. C. Fisher	D	TX-21	January 3, 1943	5th term	
137	Leon H. Gavin	R	PA-19	January 3, 1943	5th term	
138	Angier Goodwin	R	MA-08	January 3, 1943	5th term	
139	Thomas S. Gordon	D	IL-08	January 3, 1943	5th term	
140	Harold Hagen	R	MN-09	January 3, 1943	5th term	
141	Robert Hale	R	ME-01	January 3, 1943	5th term	
142	Brooks Hays	D	AR-05	January 3, 1943	5th term	
143	Christian Herter	R	MA-10	January 3, 1943	5th term	Left the House in 1953.
144	Charles B. Hoeven	R	IA-08	January 3, 1943	5th term	
145	Chester E. Holifield	D	CA-19	January 3, 1943	5th term	
146	Hal Holmes	R	WA-04	January 3, 1943	5th term	
147	Walt Horan	R	WA-05	January 3, 1943	5th term	
148	Justin L. Johnson	R	CA-03	January 3, 1943	5th term	
149	Walter Judd	R	MN-05	January 3, 1943	5th term	
150	Bernard W. Kearney	R	NY-31	January 3, 1943	5th term	
151	Henry D. Larcade Jr.	D	LA-07	January 3, 1943	5th term	Left the House in 1953.
152	Ray Madden	D	IN-01	January 3, 1943	5th term	
153	Mike Mansfield	D	MT-01	January 3, 1943	5th term	Left the House in 1953.
154	Chester Earl Merrow	R	NH-01	January 3, 1943	5th term	
155	Arthur L. Miller	R	NE-04	January 3, 1943	5th term	
156	James H. Morrison	D	LA-06	January 3, 1943	5th term	
157	Tom J. Murray	D	TN-08	January 3, 1943	5th term	
158	Thomas J. O'Brien	D	IL-06	January 3, 1943; Previous service, 1933–1939.	8th term*	
159	Alvin O'Konski	R	WI-10	January 3, 1943	5th term	
160	Philip J. Philbin	D	MA-03	January 3, 1943	5th term	
161	John J. Phillips	R	CA-22	January 3, 1943	5th term	
162	Sid Simpson	R	IL-20	January 3, 1943	5th term	
163	Lowell Stockman	R	OR-02	January 3, 1943	5th term	Left the House in 1953.
164	Dean P. Taylor	R	NY-33	January 3, 1943	5th term	
165	Harry Lancaster Towe	R	NJ-09	January 3, 1943	5th term	Resigned on September 7, 1951.
166	Charles W. Vursell	R	IL-24	January 3, 1943	5th term	
167	Alvin F. Weichel	R	OH-13	January 3, 1943	5th term	
168	W. Arthur Winstead	D	MS-05	January 3, 1943	5th term	
169	Clair Engle	D	CA-02	August 31, 1943	5th term	
170	Errett P. Scrivner	R	KS-02	September 14, 1943	5th term	
171	Samuel K. McConnell Jr.	R	PA-16	January 18, 1944	5th term	
172	George W. Andrews	D	AL-03	March 14, 1944	5th term	
173	William G. Stigler	D	OK-02	March 28, 1944	5th term	Died on August 21, 1952.
174	John J. Rooney	D	NY-12	June 6, 1944	5th term	
175	John W. Byrnes	R	WI-08	January 3, 1945	4th term	
176	Clifford P. Case	R	NJ-06	January 3, 1945	4th term	
177	Frank Chelf	D	KY-04	January 3, 1945	4th term	
178	Albert M. Cole	R	KS-01	January 3, 1945	4th term	Left the House in 1953.
179	Jesse M. Combs	D	TX-02	January 3, 1945	4th term	Left the House in 1953.
180	Robert J. Corbett	R	PA-30	January 3, 1945; Previous service, 1939–1941.	5th term*	
181	James I. Dolliver	R	IA-06	January 3, 1945	4th term	
182	George Hyde Fallon	D	MD-04	January 3, 1945	4th term	
183	James G. Fulton	R	PA-31	January 3, 1945	4th term	
184	Albert A. Gore Sr.	D	TN-04	January 3, 1945; Previous service, 1939–1944.	4th term*	Left the House in 1953.
185	Ralph W. Gwinn	R	NY-27	January 3, 1945	4th term	
186	T. Millet Hand	R	NJ-02	January 3, 1945	4th term	
187	Franck R. Havenner	P	CA-04	January 3, 1945; Previous service, 1937–1941.	6th term*	Left the House in 1953.
188	E. H. Hedrick	D	WV-06	January 3, 1945	4th term	Left the House in 1953.
189	John W. Heselton	R	MA-01	January 3, 1945	4th term	
190	Henry J. Latham	R	NY-03	January 3, 1945	4th term	
191	John E. Lyle Jr.	D	TX-14	January 3, 1945	4th term	
192	Gordon L. McDonough	R	CA-15	January 3, 1945	4th term	
193	George Paul Miller	D	CA-06	January 3, 1945	4th term	
194	Thomas E. Morgan	D	PA-24	January 3, 1945	4th term	
195	Tom Pickett	D	TX-07	January 3, 1945	4th term	Resigned on June 30, 1952.
196	Charles Melvin Price	D	IL-25	January 3, 1945	4th term	
197	Adam Clayton Powell Jr.	D	NY-22	January 3, 1945	4th term	
198	Albert Rains	D	AL-05	January 3, 1945	4th term	
199	Dwight L. Rogers	D	FL-06	January 3, 1945	4th term	
200	Robert L. F. Sikes	D	FL-03	January 3, 1945; Previous service, 1941–1944.	5th term*	
201	James William Trimble	D	AR-03	January 3, 1945	4th term	
202	John Stephens Wood	D	GA-09	January 3, 1945; Previous service, 1931–1935.	6th term*	Left the House in 1953.
203	John E. Fogarty	D	RI-02	February 7, 1945; Previous service, 1941–1944.	6th term*	
204	J. Vaughan Gary	D	VA-03	March 6, 1945	4th term	
205	Wesley A. D'Ewart	R	MT-02	June 5, 1945	4th term	
206	A. Walter Norblad	R	OR-01	January 18, 1946	4th term	
207	Arthur G. Klein	D	NY-19	February 19, 1946; Previous service, 1941–1945.	6th term*	
208	Frank Buchanan	D	PA-33	May 21, 1946	4th term	Died on April 27, 1951.
209	Olin E. Teague	D	TX-06	August 24, 1946	4th term	
210	Burr Harrison	D	VA-07	November 5, 1946	4th term	
211	Thomas B. Stanley	D	VA-05	November 5, 1946	4th term	
212	Carl Albert	D	OK-03	January 3, 1947	3rd term	
213	John J. Allen Jr.	R	CA-07	January 3, 1947	3rd term	
214	Laurie C. Battle	D	AL-09	January 3, 1947	3rd term	
215	John B. Bennett	R	MI-12	January 3, 1947; Previous service, 1943–1945.	4th term*	
216	John Blatnik	D	MN-08	January 3, 1947	3rd term	
217	Hale Boggs	D	LA-02	January 3, 1947; Previous service, 1941–1943.	4th term*	
218	J. Caleb Boggs	R	DE	January 3, 1947	3rd term	Left the House in 1953.
219	Ernest K. Bramblett	R	CA-11	January 3, 1947	3rd term	
220	Omar Burleson	D	TX-17	January 3, 1947	3rd term	
221	Norris Cotton	R	NH-02	January 3, 1947	3rd term	
222	Frederic René Coudert Jr.	R	NY-17	January 3, 1947	3rd term	
223	Paul B. Dague	R	PA-09	January 3, 1947	3rd term	
224	James C. Davis	D	GA-05	January 3, 1947	3rd term	
225	Charles B. Deane	D	NC-08	January 3, 1947	3rd term	
226	Harold Donohue	D	MA-04	January 3, 1947	3rd term	
227	Joe L. Evins	D	TN-05	January 3, 1947	3rd term	
228	Katharine St. George	R	NY-29	January 3, 1947	3rd term	
229	Porter Hardy Jr.	D	VA-02	January 3, 1947	3rd term	
230	Donald L. Jackson	R	CA-16	January 3, 1947	3rd term	
231	Jacob K. Javits	R	NY-21	January 3, 1947	3rd term	
232	Edward H. Jenison	R	IL-23	January 3, 1947	3rd term	Left the House in 1953.
233	Hamilton C. Jones	D	NC-10	January 3, 1947	3rd term	Left the House in 1953.
234	Frank M. Karsten	D	MO-13	January 3, 1947	3rd term	
235	Carroll D. Kearns	R	PA-28	January 3, 1947	3rd term	
236	Kenneth Keating	R	NY-40	January 3, 1947	3rd term	
237	John F. Kennedy	D	MA-11	January 3, 1947	3rd term	Left the House in 1953.
238	Henderson Lovelace Lanham	D	GA-07	January 3, 1947	3rd term	
239	Wingate H. Lucas	D	TX-12	January 3, 1947	3rd term	
240	Edward Tylor Miller	R	MD-01	January 3, 1947	3rd term	
241	Toby Morris	D	OK-06	January 3, 1947	3rd term	Left the House in 1953.
242	Thurston Ballard Morton	R	KY-03	January 3, 1947	3rd term	Left the House in 1953.
243	Otto Passman	D	LA-05	January 3, 1947	3rd term	
244	James T. Patterson	R	CT-05	January 3, 1947	3rd term	
245	Prince Preston	D	GA-01	January 3, 1947	3rd term	
246	Norris Poulson	R	CA-13	January 3, 1947; Previous service, 1943–1945.	4th term*	
247	Monroe Minor Redden	D	NC-12	January 3, 1947	3rd term	Left the House in 1953.
248	R. Walter Riehlman	R	NY-36	January 3, 1947	3rd term	
249	Antoni Sadlak	R	CT	January 3, 1947	3rd term	
250	Hardie Scott	R	PA-03	January 3, 1947	3rd term	Left the House in 1953.
251	Hugh Scott	R	PA-06	January 3, 1947; Previous service, 1941–1945.	5th term*	
252	Wint Smith	R	KS-06	January 3, 1947	3rd term	
253	Thor C. Tollefson	R	WA-06	January 3, 1947	3rd term	
254	William M. Wheeler	D	GA-08	January 3, 1947	3rd term	
255	John Bell Williams	D	MS-07	January 3, 1947	3rd term	
256	Joseph Franklin Wilson	D	TX-05	January 3, 1947	3rd term	
257	James E. Van Zandt	R	PA-22	January 3, 1947; Previous service, 1939–1943.	6th term*	
258	Robert E. Jones Jr.	D	AL-08	January 28, 1947	3rd term	
259	Glenn Robert Davis	R	WI-02	April 22, 1947	3rd term	
260	Russell V. Mack	R	WA-03	July 7, 1947	3rd term	
261	Edward Garmatz	D	MD-03	July 15, 1947	3rd term	
262	Kenneth M. Regan	D	TX-16	August 23, 1947	3rd term	
263	Clark W. Thompson	D	TX-09	August 23, 1947; Previous service, 1933–1935.	4th term*	
264	Charles E. Potter	R	MI-11	August 26, 1947	3rd term	Resigned on November 4, 1952.
265	Ralph Harvey	R	IN-10	November 4, 1947	3rd term	
266	William Moore McCulloch	R	OH-04	November 4, 1947	3rd term	
267	Abraham J. Multer	D	NY-14	November 4, 1947	3rd term	
268	Donald W. Nicholson	R	MA-09	November 18, 1947	3rd term	
269	Watkins Moorman Abbitt	D	VA-04	February 17, 1948	3rd term	
270	John A. Whitaker	D	KY-02	April 17, 1948	3rd term	Died on December 15, 1951.
271	Clarence G. Burton	D	VA-06	November 2, 1948	3rd term	Left the House in 1953.
272	Paul C. Jones	D	MO-10	November 2, 1948	3rd term	
273	Lloyd Bentsen	D	TX-15	December 4, 1948	3rd term	
274	Hugh Joseph Addonizio	D	NJ-11	January 3, 1949	2nd term	
275	Wayne N. Aspinall	D	CO-04	January 3, 1949	2nd term	
276	Cleveland M. Bailey	D	WV-03	January 3, 1949; Previous service, 1945–1947.	3rd term*	
277	Walter S. Baring Jr.	D	NV	January 3, 1949	2nd term	Left the House in 1953.
278	William A. Barrett	D	PA-01	January 3, 1949; Previous service, 1945–1947.	3rd term*	
279	Charles Edward Bennett	D	FL-02	January 3, 1949	2nd term	
280	Richard Walker Bolling	D	MO-05	January 3, 1949	2nd term	
281	Reva Beck Bosone	D	UT-02	January 3, 1949	2nd term	Left the House in 1953.
282	Edward G. Breen	D	OH-03	January 3, 1949	2nd term	Resigned on October 1, 1951.
283	Usher L. Burdick	R	ND	January 3, 1949; Previous service, 1935–1945.	7th term*	
284	Maurice G. Burnside	D	WV-04	January 3, 1949	2nd term	Left the House in 1953.
285	Frank E. Carlyle	D	NC-07	January 3, 1949	2nd term	
286	A. S. J. Carnahan	D	MO-08	January 3, 1949; Previous service, 1945–1947.	3rd term*	
287	Richard Thurmond Chatham	D	NC-05	January 3, 1949	2nd term	
288	Earl Chudoff	D	PA-04	January 3, 1949	2nd term	
289	L. Gary Clemente	D	NY-04	January 3, 1949	2nd term	Left the House in 1953.
290	Edward deGraffenried	D	AL-06	January 3, 1949	2nd term	Left the House in 1953.
291	James J. Delaney	D	NY-06	January 3, 1949; Previous service, 1945–1947.	3rd term*	
292	Winfield K. Denton	D	IN-08	January 3, 1949	2nd term	Left the House in 1953.
293	Isidore Dollinger	D	NY-24	January 3, 1949	2nd term	
294	Clyde Doyle	D	CA-18	January 3, 1949; Previous service, 1945–1947.	3rd term*	
295	Carl Elliott	D	AL-07	January 3, 1949	2nd term	
296	Daniel J. Flood	D	PA-11	January 3, 1949; Previous service, 1945–1947.	3rd term*	Left the House in 1953.
297	Gerald Ford	R	MI-05	January 3, 1949	2nd term	
298	James B. Frazier Jr.	D	TN-03	January 3, 1949	2nd term	
299	Thomas B. Fugate	D	VA-09	January 3, 1949	2nd term	Left the House in 1953.
300	Foster Furcolo	D	MA-02	January 3, 1949	2nd term	Resigned on September 30, 1952.
301	James S. Golden	R	KY-09	January 3, 1949	2nd term	
302	William T. Granahan	D	PA-02	January 3, 1949; Previous service, 1945–1947.	3rd term*	
303	William J. Green Jr.	D	PA-05	January 3, 1949; Previous service, 1945–1947.	3rd term*	
304	H. R. Gross	R	IA-03	January 3, 1949	2nd term	
305	Cecil M. Harden	R	IN-06	January 3, 1949	2nd term	
306	Wayne Hays	D	OH-18	January 3, 1949	2nd term	
307	Albert S. Herlong Jr.	D	FL-05	January 3, 1949	2nd term	
308	Richard W. Hoffman	R	IL-10	January 3, 1949	2nd term	
309	Charles R. Howell	D	NJ-04	January 3, 1949	2nd term	
310	Leonard Irving	D	MO-04	January 3, 1949	2nd term	Left the House in 1953.
311	Benjamin F. James	R	PA-07	January 3, 1949	2nd term	
312	Edgar A. Jonas	R	IL-12	January 3, 1949	2nd term	
313	James F. Lind	D	PA-21	January 3, 1949	2nd term	Left the House in 1953.
314	Harold Lovre	R	SD-01	January 3, 1949	2nd term	
315	Peter F. Mack Jr.	D	IL-21	January 3, 1949	2nd term	
316	Clare Magee	D	MO-01	January 3, 1949	2nd term	Left the House in 1953.
317	Fred Marshall	D	MN-06	January 3, 1949	2nd term	
318	Eugene McCarthy	D	MN-04	January 3, 1949	2nd term	
319	Christopher C. McGrath	D	NY-26	January 3, 1949	2nd term	Left the House in 1953.
320	John A. McGuire	D	CT-03	January 3, 1949	2nd term	Left the House in 1953.
321	Clinton D. McKinnon	D	CA-23	January 3, 1949	2nd term	Left the House in 1953.
322	Hugh Mitchell	D	WA-01	January 3, 1949	2nd term	Left the House in 1953.
323	Morgan M. Moulder	D	MO-02	January 3, 1949	2nd term	
324	James J. Murphy	D	NY-16	January 3, 1949	2nd term	Left the House in 1953.
325	Charles P. Nelson	R	ME-02	January 3, 1949	2nd term	
326	George D. O'Brien	D	MI-13	January 3, 1949; Previous service, 1937–1939 and 1941–1947.	6th term**	
327	Harry P. O'Neill	D	PA-10	January 3, 1949	2nd term	Left the House in 1953.
328	Harold Patten	D	AZ-02	January 3, 1949	2nd term	
329	Carl D. Perkins	D	KY-07	January 3, 1949	2nd term	
330	James G. Polk	D	OH-06	January 3, 1949; Previous service, 1931–1941.	7th term*	
331	T. Vincent Quinn	D	NY-05	January 3, 1949	2nd term	Resigned on December 30, 1951.
332	Louis C. Rabaut	D	MI-14	January 3, 1949; Previous service, 1935–1947.	8th term*	
333	Robert L. Ramsay	D	WV-01	January 3, 1949; Previous service, 1933–1939 and 1941–1943.	6th term**	Left the House in 1953.
334	George M. Rhodes	D	PA-13	January 3, 1949	2nd term	
335	Abraham A. Ribicoff	D	CT-01	January 3, 1949	2nd term	Left the House in 1953.
336	Peter W. Rodino	D	NJ-10	January 3, 1949	2nd term	
337	Hubert B. Scudder	R	CA-01	January 3, 1949	2nd term	
338	Robert T. Secrest	D	OH-15	January 3, 1949; Previous service, 1933–1942.	6th term*	
339	Harley Orrin Staggers	D	WV-02	January 3, 1949	2nd term	
340	Tom Steed	D	OK-04	January 3, 1949	2nd term	
341	John B. Sullivan	D	MO-11	January 3, 1949; Previous service, 1941–1943 and 1945–1947.	4th term**	Died on January 29, 1951.
342	James Patrick Sutton	D	TN-07	January 3, 1949	2nd term	
343	Boyd Anderson Tackett	D	AR-04	January 3, 1949	2nd term	Left the House in 1953.
344	Homer Thornberry	D	TX-10	January 3, 1949	2nd term	
345	Thomas R. Underwood	D	KY-06	January 3, 1949	2nd term	Resigned on March 17, 1951.
346	Harold H. Velde	R	IL-18	January 3, 1949	2nd term	
347	Phil J. Welch	D	MO-03	January 3, 1949	2nd term	Left the House in 1953.
348	Thomas H. Werdel	R	CA-10	January 3, 1949	2nd term	Left the House in 1953.
349	Victor Wickersham	D	OK-07	January 3, 1949; Previous service, 1941–1947.	5th term*	
350	Roy Wier	D	MN-03	January 3, 1949	2nd term	
351	Edwin E. Willis	D	LA-03	January 3, 1949	2nd term	
352	Gardner R. Withrow	R	WI-03	January 3, 1949; Previous service, 1931–1939.	6th term*	
353	Sidney R. Yates	D	IL-09	January 3, 1949	2nd term	
354	Clement J. Zablocki	D	WI-04	January 3, 1949	2nd term	
355	Louis B. Heller	D	NY-07	February 15, 1949	2nd term	
356	Franklin D. Roosevelt Jr.	D	NY-20	May 17, 1949	2nd term	
357	John P. Saylor	R	PA-26	September 13, 1949	2nd term	
358	Edna F. Kelly	D	NY-10	November 8, 1949	2nd term	
359	John F. Shelley	D	CA-05	November 8, 1949	2nd term	
360	William B. Widnall	R	NJ-07	February 6, 1950	2nd term	
361	William H. Bates	R	MA-06	February 14, 1950	2nd term	
362	Edward J. Robeson Jr.	D	VA-01	May 2, 1950	2nd term	
363	Myron V. George	R	KS-03	November 7, 1950	2nd term	
364	Woodrow W. Jones	D	NC-11	November 7, 1950	2nd term	
365	Fred G. Aandahl	R	ND	January 3, 1951	1st term	Left the House in 1953.
366	E. Ross Adair	R	IN-04	January 3, 1951	1st term	
367	Victor Anfuso	D	NY-08	January 3, 1951	1st term	Left the House in 1953.
368	Orland K. Armstrong	R	MO-06	January 3, 1951	1st term	Left the House in 1953.
369	William Hanes Ayres	R	OH-14	January 3, 1951	1st term	
370	Howard Baker Sr.	R	TN-02	January 3, 1951	1st term	
371	John V. Beamer	R	IN-05	January 3, 1951	1st term	
372	Page Belcher	R	OK-08	January 3, 1951	1st term	
373	George H. Bender	R	OH-23	January 3, 1951; Previous service, 1939–1949.	6th term*	
374	Ellis Yarnal Berry	R	SD-02	January 3, 1951	1st term	
375	Jackson Edward Betts	R	OH-08	January 3, 1951	1st term	
376	Frank T. Bow	R	OH-16	January 3, 1951	1st term	
377	William G. Bray	R	IN-07	January 3, 1951	1st term	
378	Horace Seely-Brown Jr.	R	CT-02	January 3, 1951; Previous service, 1947–1949.	2nd term*	
379	Charles B. Brownson	R	IN-11	January 3, 1951	1st term	
380	Hamer H. Budge	R	ID-02	January 3, 1951	1st term	
381	Howard Buffett	R	NE-02	January 3, 1951; Previous service, 1943–1949.	4th term*	Left the House in 1953.
382	Fred E. Busbey	R	IL-03	January 3, 1951; Previous service, 1943–1945 and 1947–1949.	3rd term**	
383	Alvin Bush	R	PA-15	January 3, 1951	1st term	
384	John Cornelius Butler	R	NY-44	January 3, 1951; Previous service, 1941–1949.	5th term*	Left the House in 1953.
385	John Chenoweth	R	CO-03	January 3, 1951; Previous service, 1941–1949.	5th term*	
386	Marguerite S. Church	R	IL-13	January 3, 1951	1st term	
387	Shepard J. Crumpacker Jr.	R	IN-03	January 3, 1951	1st term	
388	Thomas B. Curtis	R	MO-12	January 3, 1951	1st term	
389	John J. Dempsey	D	NM	January 3, 1951; Previous service, 1935–1941.	4th term*	
390	Harmar D. Denny Jr.	R	PA-29	January 3, 1951	1st term	Left the House in 1953.
391	James Devereux	R	MD-02	January 3, 1951	1st term	
392	James G. Donovan	D	NY-18	January 3, 1951	1st term	
393	William Jennings Bryan Dorn	D	SC-03	January 3, 1951; Previous service, 1947–1949.	2nd term*	
394	Sidney A. Fine	D	NY-23	January 3, 1951	1st term	
395	Tic Forrester	D	GA-03	January 3, 1951	1st term	
396	Ernest Greenwood	D	NY-01	January 3, 1951	1st term	Left the House in 1953.
397	William H. Harrison	R	WY	January 3, 1951	1st term	
398	William E. Hess	R	OH-02	January 3, 1951; Previous service, 1929–1937 and 1939–1949.	10th term**	
399	Patrick J. Hillings	R	CA-12	January 3, 1951	1st term	
400	Allan O. Hunter	R	CA-09	January 3, 1951	1st term	
401	John Jarman	D	OK-05	January 3, 1951	1st term	
402	Charles J. Kersten	R	WI-05	January 3, 1951; Previous service, 1947–1949.	2nd term*	
403	John C. Kluczynski	D	IL-05	January 3, 1951	1st term	
404	William C. Lantaff	D	FL-04	January 3, 1951	1st term	
405	John Lesinski Jr.	D	MI-16	January 3, 1951	1st term	
406	Thaddeus M. Machrowicz	D	MI-01	January 3, 1951	1st term	
407	Chester B. McMullen	D	FL-01	January 3, 1951	1st term	Left the House in 1953.
408	William E. McVey	R	IL-04	January 3, 1951	1st term	
409	George Meader	R	MI-02	January 3, 1951	1st term	
410	William E. Miller	R	NY-42	January 3, 1951	1st term	
411	Albert P. Morano	R	CT-04	January 3, 1951	1st term	
412	Walter M. Mumma	R	PA-18	January 3, 1951	1st term	
413	Harold C. Ostertag	R	NY-41	January 3, 1951	1st term	
414	Winston L. Prouty	R	VT	January 3, 1951	1st term	
415	Edmund P. Radwan	R	NY-43	January 3, 1951	1st term	
416	Frazier Reams	I	OH-09	January 3, 1951	1st term	
417	B. Carroll Reece	R	TN-01	January 3, 1951; Previous service, 1921–1931 and 1933–1947.	10th term**	
418	John J. Riley	D	SC-02	January 3, 1951; Previous service, 1945–1949.	3rd term*	
419	Kenneth A. Roberts	D	AL-04	January 3, 1951	1st term	
420	Byron G. Rogers	D	CO-01	January 3, 1951	1st term	
421	Walter E. Rogers	D	TX-18	January 3, 1951	1st term	
422	George B. Schwabe	R	OK-01	January 3, 1951; Previous service, 1945–1949.	3rd term*	Died on April 2, 1952.
423	Timothy P. Sheehan	R	IL-11	January 3, 1951	1st term	
424	Alfred Dennis Sieminski	D	NJ-13	January 3, 1951	1st term	
425	Edward L. Sittler Jr.	R	PA-23	January 3, 1951	1st term	Left the House in 1953.
426	Frank E. Smith	D	MS-03	January 3, 1951	1st term	
427	William L. Springer	R	IL-22	January 3, 1951	1st term	
428	Ruth Thompson	R	MI-09	January 3, 1951	1st term	
429	Richard B. Vail	R	IL-02	January 3, 1951; Previous service, 1947–1949.	2nd term*	Left the House in 1953.
430	Albert C. Vaughn	R	PA-08	January 3, 1951	1st term	Died on September 1, 1951.
431	J. Ernest Wharton	R	NY-30	January 3, 1951	1st term	
432	William R. Williams	R	NY-35	January 3, 1951	1st term	
433	John Travers Wood	R	ID-01	January 3, 1951	1st term	Left the House in 1953.
434	William Van Pelt	R	WI-06	January 3, 1951	1st term	
435	Sam Yorty	D	CA-14	January 3, 1951	1st term	
	Claude I. Bakewell	R	MO-11	March 9, 1951; Previous service, 1947–1949.	2nd term*	Left the House in 1953.
	John C. Watts	D	KY-06	April 4, 1951	1st term	
	Elizabeth Kee	D	WV-05	July 17, 1951	1st term	
	Vera Buchanan	D	PA-33	July 24, 1951	1st term	
	Frank N. Ikard	D	TX-13	September 8, 1951	1st term	
	Clifford McIntire	R	ME-03	October 22, 1951	1st term	
	Joseph L. Carrigg	R	PA-14	November 6, 1951	1st term	
	Karl C. King	R	PA-08	November 6, 1951	1st term	
	Frank C. Osmers Jr.	R	NJ-09	November 6, 1951; Previous service, 1939–1943.	3rd term*	
	Paul F. Schenck	R	OH-03	November 6, 1951	1st term	
	Robert Dinsmore Harrison	R	NE-03	December 4, 1951	1st term	
	Robert Tripp Ross	R	NY-05	February 19, 1952; Previous service, 1947–1949.	2nd term*	Left the House in 1953.
	Leo W. O'Brien	D	NY-32	April 1, 1952	1st term	
	Garrett L. Withers	D	KY-02	August 2, 1952	1st term	
	John Dowdy	D	TX-07	September 23, 1952	1st term	

== Delegates ==
Rank	Delegate	Party	District	Seniority date (Previous service, if any)	No.# of term(s)	Notes
1	Joseph Rider Farrington	R	HI	January 3, 1943	5th term	
2	Bob Bartlett	D	AK	January 3, 1945	4th term	
3	Antonio Fernós-Isern	D	PR	September 11, 1946	4th term	

== See also ==
- 82nd United States Congress
- List of United States congressional districts
- List of United States senators in the 82nd Congress
