= Pennsylvania's 8th congressional district =

U.S. House district for Pennsylvania

Coordinates: 40°20′10″N 75°09′04″W

- Interactive map of district boundaries since January 3, 2023
- Representative: Rob Bresnahan; R–Dallas Township
- Population (2025): 774,838
- Median household income: $71,579
- Ethnicity: 74.6% White; 13.2% Hispanic; 6.3% Black; 3.3% Two or more races; 2.0% Asian; 0.6% other
- Cook PVI: R+4

Pennsylvania's 8th congressional district is located in the northeastern region of the state. It encompasses all of Wayne, Pike, and Lackawanna Counties; along with portions of Luzerne and Monroe counties.

The district had been anchored in Bucks County from the 1940s until 2018, even as most other districts in Pennsylvania changed drastically during that time frame due to population shifts and Pennsylvania's loss of seats in the House.

The Supreme Court of Pennsylvania redrew the district in February 2018 after ruling the previous map unconstitutional due to gerrymandering. The 8th district was reassigned to the northeastern part of the state for the 2018 elections and representation thereafter. It is geographically the successor of the former 17th district, including the ancestrally Democratic cities of Scranton and Wilkes-Barre in the Wyoming Valley. Portions of the new 8th district also came from the old 10th district, including the more conservative counties of Pike and Wayne. Meanwhile, the Bucks County district was renumbered as the 1st district.

The district contains a mix of suburban and rural communities centered around the industrial hubs of Scranton and Wilkes-Barre that are predominantly white and working class. While a longtime Democratic stronghold, the Democrats in this region are populist-leaning, different from their counterparts in Philadelphia and Pittsburgh. The district voted for Barack Obama in 2008 and 2012 but swung for Donald Trump in 2016, 2020, and 2024, the first time much of this area had voted for a Republican since the 1980s.

However, Democrats still dominate down ballot. It was one of five districts that voted for Donald Trump in the 2020 while being won or held by a Democrat in 2022. At the time it was also the most Republican-leaning district held by a member of the Congressional Progressive Caucus based on the Cook Partisan Voting Index. The district has only elected a Republican to Congress three times since 1947, in the Republican waves of 1980 and 2010 and most recently in 2024 when current representative Rob Bresnahan narrowly ousted then-incumbent Matt Cartwright, a Democrat.

== Recent election results from statewide races ==
Year	Office	Results
2008	President	Obama 57% - 42%
2008	Attorney General	Corbett 52% - 48%
2008	Auditor General	Wagner 65% - 35%
2010	Senate	Sestak 52% - 48%
2010	Governor	Corbett 52% - 48%
2012	President	Obama 56% - 44%
2012	Senate	Casey Jr. 59% - 41%
2014	Governor	Wolf 60% - 40%
2016	President	Trump 53% - 44%
2016	Senate	McGinty 47.4% - 46.7%
2016	Attorney General	Shapiro 53% - 47%
2016	Auditor General	DePasquale 52% - 42%
2016	Treasurer	Torsella 53% - 41%
2018	Senate	Casey Jr. 52% - 46%
2018	Governor	Wolf 57% - 42%
2020	President	Trump 51% - 48%
2020	Attorney General	Shapiro 52% - 45%
2020	Auditor General	DeFoor 49% - 47%
2020	Treasurer	Torsella 48.29% - 48.26%
2022	Senate	Fetterman 49% - 48%
2022	Governor	Shapiro 54% - 44%
2024	President	Trump 54% - 45%
2024	Senate	McCormick 51% - 47%
2024	Attorney General	Sunday 52% - 45%
2024	Auditor General	DeFoor 52% - 44%
2024	Treasurer	Garrity 53% - 44%

== Composition ==
Lackawanna County (40)

All 40 municipalities

Luzerne County (55)

Ashley, Avoca, Bear Creek Township, Bear Creek Village, Buck Township, Butler Township (part; also 9th; includes Beech Mountain Lakes), Courtdale, Dallas Township, Dennison Township, Dupont, Duryea, Edwardsville, Exeter Borough, Exeter Township, Fairview Township, Freeland, Forty Fort, Foster Township, Franklin Township, Hanover Township, Harveys Lake, Hazle Township, Hazleton, Hughestown, Jackson Township, Jeddo, Jenkins Township, Kingston Borough, Kingston Township, Laflin, Larksville, Laurel Run, Luzerne, Nanticoke, Newport Township (part; also 9th; includes Sheatown and Wanamie), Nuangola, Penn Lake Park, Pittston, Pittston Township, Plains Township, Plymouth Borough, Plymouth Township, Pringle, Rice Township, Sugar Notch, Swoyersville, Warrior Run, West Pittston, West Hazleton, West Wyoming, White Haven, Wilkes-Barre, Wilkes-Barre Township, Wright Township, Wyoming, Yatesville

Monroe County (18)

Barrett Township, Chestnuthill Township, Coolbaugh Township, Delaware Water Gap, East Stroudsburg, Hamilton Township, Jackson Township, Middle Smithfield Township, Mount Pocono, Paradise Township, Pocono Township, Price Township, Ross Township (part; also 7th; includes part of Saylorsburg), Smithfield Township, Stroud Township, Stroudsburg, Tobyhanna Township, Tunkhannock Township

Pike County (13)

All 13 municipalities

Wayne County (28)

All 28 municipalities

== List of members representing the district ==
The district was created in 1791.

=== 1791–1793: one seat ===
Representative	Party	Years	Cong ress	Electoral history
District first established March 4, 1791
William Findley (Youngstown)	Anti-Administration	March 4, 1791 – March 3, 1793	2nd	Elected in 1791. Redistricted to the at-large district.

District eliminated in 1793 and replaced by the at-large district.

=== 1795–1823: one seat ===
District restored in 1795.

Representative	Party	Years	Cong ress	Electoral history
Thomas Hartley (York)	Federalist	March 4, 1795 – December 21, 1800	4th 5th 6th	Redistricted from the at-large district and re-elected in 1794. Re-elected in 1796. Re-elected in 1798. Retired and then died.
Vacant		December 21, 1800 – January 15, 1801	6th	
John Stewart (York)	Democratic-Republican	January 15, 1801 – March 3, 1803	6th 7th	Elected in 1800. Elected January 15, 1801, to finish Hartley's term and seated February 3, 1801. Redistricted to the 6th district.
William Findley (Youngstown)	Democratic-Republican	March 4, 1803 – March 3, 1813	8th 9th 10th 11th 12th	Elected in 1802. Re-elected in 1804. Re-elected in 1806. Re-elected in 1808. Re-elected in 1810. Redistricted to the 11th district.
William Piper (Bloodyrun)	Democratic-Republican	March 4, 1813 – March 3, 1817	13th 14th	Redistricted from the 7th district and re-elected in 1812. Re-elected in 1814. Retired.
Alexander Ogle (Somerset)	Democratic-Republican	March 4, 1817 – March 3, 1819	15th	Elected in 1816. Retired.
Robert Philson (Somerset)	Democratic-Republican	March 4, 1819 – March 3, 1821	16th	Elected in 1818. Lost re-election as a Federalist.
John Tod (Bedford)	Democratic-Republican	March 4, 1821 – March 3, 1823	17th	Elected in 1820. Redistricted to the 13th district.

=== 1823–1833: two seats ===
Years	Cong ress	Seat A			Seat B		
Years	Cong ress	Representative	Party	Electoral history	Representative	Party	Electoral history
March 4, 1823 – April 20, 1824	18th	Thomas Jones Rogers (Easton)	Democratic-Republican	Redistricted from the 6th district and re-elected in 1822. Resigned.	Samuel D. Ingham (New Hope)	Democratic-Republican	Redistricted from the 6th district and re-elected in 1822. Re-elected in 1824. Re-elected in 1826. Re-elected in 1828 but resigned to become U.S. Secretary of the Treasury.
April 20, 1824 – December 9, 1824	18th	Vacant			Samuel D. Ingham (New Hope)	Democratic-Republican	Redistricted from the 6th district and re-elected in 1822. Re-elected in 1824. Re-elected in 1826. Re-elected in 1828 but resigned to become U.S. Secretary of the Treasury.
December 9, 1824 – March 3, 1825	18th	George Wolf (Easton)	Democratic-Republican	Elected October 12, 1824, to finish Rogers's term and seated December 9, 1824. Also elected the same day in 1824 to the next term. Re-elected in 1826. Re-elected in 1828 but resigned to become Governor of Pennsylvania.	Samuel D. Ingham (New Hope)	Democratic-Republican	Redistricted from the 6th district and re-elected in 1822. Re-elected in 1824. Re-elected in 1826. Re-elected in 1828 but resigned to become U.S. Secretary of the Treasury.
March 4, 1825 – March 3, 1829	19th 20th	George Wolf (Easton)	Jacksonian	Elected October 12, 1824, to finish Rogers's term and seated December 9, 1824. Also elected the same day in 1824 to the next term. Re-elected in 1826. Re-elected in 1828 but resigned to become Governor of Pennsylvania.	Samuel D. Ingham (New Hope)	Jacksonian	Redistricted from the 6th district and re-elected in 1822. Re-elected in 1824. Re-elected in 1826. Re-elected in 1828 but resigned to become U.S. Secretary of the Treasury.
March 4, 1829 – October 13, 1829	21st	Vacant			Vacant		
October 13, 1829 – March 3, 1833	21st 22nd	Samuel A. Smith (Rockhill)	Jacksonian	Elected October 13, 1829, to finish Wolf's term and seated December 7, 1829. Re-elected in 1830. Retired.	Peter Ihrie Jr. (Easton)	Jacksonian	Elected October 13, 1829, to finish Ingham's term and seated December 7, 1829. Re-elected in 1830. Redistricted to the 7th district and lost re-election.

=== 1833–present: one seat ===
Member	Party	Years	Cong ress	Electoral history	District location
Henry King (Allentown)	Jacksonian	March 4, 1833 – March 3, 1835	23rd	Redistricted from the 7th district and re-elected in 1832. Retired.	1833–1843 [data missing]
Edward Burd Hubley (Orwigsburg)	Jacksonian	March 4, 1835 – March 3, 1837	24th 25th	Elected in 1834. Re-elected in 1836. Retired.	1833–1843 [data missing]
Edward Burd Hubley (Orwigsburg)	Democratic	March 4, 1837 – March 3, 1839	24th 25th	Elected in 1834. Re-elected in 1836. Retired.	1833–1843 [data missing]
Peter Newhard (Allentown)	Democratic	March 4, 1839 – March 3, 1843	26th 27th	Elected in 1838. Re-elected in 1840. Retired.	1833–1843 [data missing]
Jeremiah Brown (Goshen)	Whig	March 4, 1843 – March 3, 1845	28th	Redistricted from the 4th district and re-elected in 1843. Retired.	1843–1853 [data missing]
John Strohm (New Providence)	Whig	March 4, 1845 – March 3, 1849	29th 30th	Elected in 1844. Re-elected in 1846. [data missing]	1843–1853 [data missing]
Thaddeus Stevens (Lancaster)	Whig	March 4, 1849 – March 3, 1853	31st 32nd	Elected in 1848. Re-elected in 1850. [data missing]	1843–1853 [data missing]
Henry A. Muhlenberg (Reading)	Democratic	March 4, 1853 – January 9, 1854	33rd	Elected in 1852. Died.	1853–1863 [data missing]
Vacant		January 9, 1854 – February 4, 1854	33rd		1853–1863 [data missing]
J. Glancy Jones (Reading)	Democratic	February 4, 1854 – October 30, 1858	33rd 34th 35th	Elected to finish Muhlenberg's term. Re-elected in 1854. Re-elected in 1856. Resigned to become United States Minister to Austria.	1853–1863 [data missing]
Vacant		October 30, 1858 – December 7, 1858	35th		1853–1863 [data missing]
William H. Keim (Reading)	Republican	December 7, 1858 – March 3, 1859	35th	Elected to finish Jones's term. [data missing]	1853–1863 [data missing]
John Schwartz (Reading)	Anti-Lecompton Democratic	March 4, 1859 – June 20, 1860	36th	Elected in 1858. Died.	1853–1863 [data missing]
Vacant		June 20, 1860 – December 3, 1860	36th		1853–1863 [data missing]
Jacob K. McKenty (Reading)	Democratic	December 3, 1860 – March 3, 1861	36th	Elected to finish Schwartz's term. Retired.	1853–1863 [data missing]
Sydenham E. Ancona (Reading)	Democratic	March 4, 1861 – March 3, 1867	37th 38th 39th	Elected in 1860. Re-elected in 1862. Re-elected in 1864. Lost renomination.	1853–1863 [data missing]
Sydenham E. Ancona (Reading)	Democratic	March 4, 1861 – March 3, 1867	37th 38th 39th	Elected in 1860. Re-elected in 1862. Re-elected in 1864. Lost renomination.	1863–1873 [data missing]
James L. Getz (Reading)	Democratic	March 4, 1867 – March 3, 1873	40th 41st 42nd	Elected in 1866. Re-elected in 1868. Re-elected in 1870. Retired.	1863–1873 [data missing]
Hiester Clymer (Reading)	Democratic	March 4, 1873 – March 3, 1881	43rd 44th 45th 46th	Elected in 1872. Re-elected in 1874. Re-elected in 1876. Re-elected in 1878. [data missing]	1873–1883 [data missing]
Daniel Ermentrout (Reading)	Democratic	March 4, 1881 – March 3, 1889	47th 48th 49th 50th	Elected in 1880. Re-elected in 1882. Re-elected in 1884. Re-elected in 1886. Lost renomination.	1873–1883 [data missing]
Daniel Ermentrout (Reading)	Democratic	March 4, 1881 – March 3, 1889	47th 48th 49th 50th	Elected in 1880. Re-elected in 1882. Re-elected in 1884. Re-elected in 1886. Lost renomination.	1883–1893 [data missing]
William Mutchler (Easton)	Democratic	March 4, 1889 – June 23, 1893	51st 52nd 53rd	Elected in 1888. Re-elected in 1890. Re-elected in 1892. Died.	1883–1893 [data missing]
William Mutchler (Easton)	Democratic	March 4, 1889 – June 23, 1893	51st 52nd 53rd	Elected in 1888. Re-elected in 1890. Re-elected in 1892. Died.	1893–1903 [data missing]
Vacant		June 23, 1893 – August 7, 1893	53rd		1893–1903 [data missing]
Howard Mutchler (Easton)	Democratic	August 7, 1893 – March 3, 1895	53rd	Elected to finish his father's term. Retired.	1893–1903 [data missing]
Joseph J. Hart (Milford)	Democratic	March 4, 1895 – March 3, 1897	54th	Elected in 1894. Retired.	1893–1903 [data missing]
William S. Kirkpatrick (Easton)	Republican	March 4, 1897 – March 3, 1899	55th	Elected in 1896. Lost re-election.	1893–1903 [data missing]
Laird H. Barber (Mauch Chunk)	Democratic	March 4, 1899 – March 3, 1901	56th	Elected in 1898. Retired.	1893–1903 [data missing]
Howard Mutchler (Easton)	Democratic	March 4, 1901 – March 3, 1903	57th	Elected in 1900. Retired.	1893–1903 [data missing]
Irving P. Wanger (Norristown)	Republican	March 4, 1903 – March 3, 1911	58th 59th 60th 61st	Redistricted from the 7th district and re-elected in 1902. Re-elected in 1904. Re-elected in 1906. Re-elected in 1908. Lost re-election.	1903–1913 [data missing]
Robert E. Difenderfer (Jenkintown)	Democratic	March 4, 1911 – March 3, 1915	62nd 63rd	Elected in 1910. Re-elected in 1912. Lost renomination.	1903–1913 [data missing]
Robert E. Difenderfer (Jenkintown)	Democratic	March 4, 1911 – March 3, 1915	62nd 63rd	Elected in 1910. Re-elected in 1912. Lost renomination.	1913–1933 [data missing]
Henry W. Watson (Langhorne)	Republican	March 4, 1915 – March 3, 1923	64th 65th 66th 67th	Elected in 1914. Re-elected in 1916. Re-elected in 1918. Re-elected in 1920. Redistricted to the Pennsylvania's 9th congressional district.	1913–1933 [data missing]
Thomas S. Butler (West Chester)	Republican	March 4, 1923 – May 26, 1928	68th 69th 70th	Redistricted from the 7th district and re-elected in 1922. Re-elected in 1924. Re-elected in 1926. Died.	1913–1933 [data missing]
Vacant		May 26, 1928 – November 6, 1928	70th		1913–1933 [data missing]
James Wolfenden (Upper Darby)	Republican	November 6, 1928 – January 3, 1945	70th 71st 72nd 73rd 74th 75th 76th 77th 78th	Elected to finish Butler's term. Re-elected in 1928. Re-elected in 1930. Re-elected in 1932. Re-elected in 1934. Re-elected in 1936. Re-elected in 1938. Re-elected in 1940. Re-elected in 1942. Redistricted to the Pennsylvania's 7th congressional district.	1913–1933 [data missing]
James Wolfenden (Upper Darby)	Republican	November 6, 1928 – January 3, 1945	70th 71st 72nd 73rd 74th 75th 76th 77th 78th	Elected to finish Butler's term. Re-elected in 1928. Re-elected in 1930. Re-elected in 1932. Re-elected in 1934. Re-elected in 1936. Re-elected in 1938. Re-elected in 1940. Re-elected in 1942. Redistricted to the Pennsylvania's 7th congressional district.	1933–1943 [data missing]
James Wolfenden (Upper Darby)	Republican	November 6, 1928 – January 3, 1945	70th 71st 72nd 73rd 74th 75th 76th 77th 78th	Elected to finish Butler's term. Re-elected in 1928. Re-elected in 1930. Re-elected in 1932. Re-elected in 1934. Re-elected in 1936. Re-elected in 1938. Re-elected in 1940. Re-elected in 1942. Redistricted to the Pennsylvania's 7th congressional district.	1943–1953 [data missing]
Charles L. Gerlach (Allentown)	Republican	January 3, 1945 – May 5, 1947	79th 80th	Redistricted from the 9th district and re-elected in 1944. Re-elected in 1946. Died.	1943–1953 [data missing]
Vacant		May 5, 1947 – September 9, 1947	80th		1943–1953 [data missing]
Franklin H. Lichtenwalter (Center Valley)	Republican	September 9, 1947 – January 3, 1951	80th 81st	Elected to finish Gerlach's term. Re-elected in 1948. [data missing]	1943–1953 [data missing]
Albert C. Vaughn (Fullerton)	Republican	January 3, 1951 – September 1, 1951	82nd	Elected in 1950. Died.	1943–1953 [data missing]
Vacant		September 1, 1951 – November 6, 1951	82nd		1943–1953 [data missing]
Karl C. King (Morrisville)	Republican	November 6, 1951 – January 3, 1957	82nd 83rd 84th	Elected to finish Vaughn's term. Re-elected in 1952. Re-elected in 1954. Retired.	1943–1953 [data missing]
Karl C. King (Morrisville)	Republican	November 6, 1951 – January 3, 1957	82nd 83rd 84th	Elected to finish Vaughn's term. Re-elected in 1952. Re-elected in 1954. Retired.	1953–1963 [data missing]
Willard S. Curtin (Morrisville)	Republican	January 3, 1957 – January 3, 1967	85th 86th 87th 88th 89th	Elected in 1956. Re-elected in 1958. Re-elected in 1960. Re-elected in 1962. Re-elected in 1964. Retired.	1953–1963 [data missing]
Willard S. Curtin (Morrisville)	Republican	January 3, 1957 – January 3, 1967	85th 86th 87th 88th 89th	Elected in 1956. Re-elected in 1958. Re-elected in 1960. Re-elected in 1962. Re-elected in 1964. Retired.	1963–1973 [data missing]
Edward G. Biester Jr. (Furlong)	Republican	January 3, 1967 – January 3, 1977	90th 91st 92nd 93rd 94th	Elected in 1966. Re-elected in 1968. Re-elected in 1970. Re-elected in 1972. Re-elected in 1974. Retired.	1963–1973 [data missing]
Edward G. Biester Jr. (Furlong)	Republican	January 3, 1967 – January 3, 1977	90th 91st 92nd 93rd 94th	Elected in 1966. Re-elected in 1968. Re-elected in 1970. Re-elected in 1972. Re-elected in 1974. Retired.	1973–1983 [data missing]
Peter H. Kostmayer (Solebury)	Democratic	January 3, 1977 – January 3, 1981	95th 96th	Elected in 1976. Re-elected in 1978. Lost re-election.	1973–1983 [data missing]
James K. Coyne III (Newtown)	Republican	January 3, 1981 – January 3, 1983	97th	Elected in 1980. Lost re-election.	1973–1983 [data missing]
Peter H. Kostmayer (Solebury)	Democratic	January 3, 1983 – January 3, 1993	98th 99th 100th 101st 102nd	Elected in 1982. Re-elected in 1984. Re-elected in 1986. Re-elected in 1988. Re-elected in 1990. Lost re-election.	1983–1993 [data missing]
Jim Greenwood (Erwinna)	Republican	January 3, 1993 – January 3, 2005	103rd 104th 105th 106th 107th 108th	Elected in 1992. Re-elected in 1994. Re-elected in 1996. Re-elected in 1998. Re-elected in 2000. Re-elected in 2002. Retired.	1993–2003 [data missing]
Jim Greenwood (Erwinna)	Republican	January 3, 1993 – January 3, 2005	103rd 104th 105th 106th 107th 108th	Elected in 1992. Re-elected in 1994. Re-elected in 1996. Re-elected in 1998. Re-elected in 2000. Re-elected in 2002. Retired.	2003–2013
Mike Fitzpatrick (Levittown)	Republican	January 3, 2005 – January 3, 2007	109th	Elected in 2004. Lost re-election.	2003–2013
Patrick Murphy (Bristol)	Democratic	January 3, 2007 – January 3, 2011	110th 111th	Elected in 2006. Re-elected in 2008. Lost re-election.	2003–2013
Mike Fitzpatrick (Levittown)	Republican	January 3, 2011 – January 3, 2017	112th 113th 114th	Elected in 2010. Re-elected in 2012. Re-elected in 2014. Retired.	2003–2013
Mike Fitzpatrick (Levittown)	Republican	January 3, 2011 – January 3, 2017	112th 113th 114th	Elected in 2010. Re-elected in 2012. Re-elected in 2014. Retired.	2013–2019
Brian Fitzpatrick (Langhorne)	Republican	January 3, 2017 – January 3, 2019	115th	Elected in 2016. Redistricted to the 1st district.	2013–2019
Matt Cartwright (Moosic)	Democratic	January 3, 2019 – January 3, 2025	116th 117th 118th	Redistricted from the 17th district and re-elected in 2018. Re-elected in 2020. Re-elected in 2022. Lost re-election.	2019–2023
Matt Cartwright (Moosic)	Democratic	January 3, 2019 – January 3, 2025	116th 117th 118th	Redistricted from the 17th district and re-elected in 2018. Re-elected in 2020. Re-elected in 2022. Lost re-election.	2023–
Rob Bresnahan (Dallas Township)	Republican	January 3, 2025 – present	119th	Elected in 2024. Lost re-election.	2023–
Paige Cognetti (Scranton)	Democratic	Assuming office on January 3, 2027		Elected in 2026.	2023–

== Election results ==
US House election, 2004: Pennsylvania District 8
Party	Candidate	Votes	%	±%
Republican	Mike Fitzpatrick	183,229	55	−9
Democratic	Virginia Schrader	143,427	44	+7
Libertarian	Arthur L. Farnsworth	3,710	1	+1
Constitution	Erich Lukas	898	0.3	+0.3
Turnout		331,264		

US House election, 2006: Pennsylvania District 8
Party	Candidate	Votes	%	±%
Democratic	Patrick Murphy	125,667	50	+6
Republican	Mike Fitzpatrick (incumbent)	124,146	50	−5
Turnout		249,813		

US House election, 2008: Pennsylvania District 8
Party	Candidate	Votes	%	±%
Democratic	Patrick Murphy (incumbent)	197,869	57	+7
Republican	Tom Manion	145,103	42	−8
Independent	Tom Lingenfelter	5,543	2	
Turnout		348,515		

US House election, 2010: Pennsylvania District 8
Party	Candidate	Votes	%	±%
Republican	Mike Fitzpatrick	126,404	54	+12
Democratic	Patrick Murphy (incumbent)	109,157	46	−11
Turnout		235,561		

US House election, 2012: Pennsylvania District 8
Party	Candidate	Votes	%	±%
Republican	Mike Fitzpatrick (incumbent)	199,379	56.6	+2.6
Democratic	Kathy Boockvar	152,859	43.4	−2.6
Turnout		352,238		

US House election, 2014: Pennsylvania's 8th Congressional District
Party	Candidate	Votes	%	±%
Republican	Mike Fitzpatrick (Incumbent)	137,731	61.90	
Democratic	Kevin Strouse	84,767	38.10	
Turnout		222,498		

US House election, 2016: Pennsylvania's 8th Congressional District
Party	Candidate	Votes	%
Republican	Brian Fitzpatrick	207,263	54.4
Democratic	Steve Santarsiero	173,555	45.6
Total votes		380,818	100.0
Republican hold			

US House election, 2018: Pennsylvania's 8th Congressional District
Party	Candidate	Votes	%
Democratic	Matt Cartwright (incumbent)	135,603	54.6
Republican	John Chrin	112,563	45.4
Total votes		248,166	100.0
Democratic hold			

US House election, 2020: Pennsylvania's 8th Congressional District
Party	Candidate	Votes	%
Democratic	Matt Cartwright (incumbent)	178,004	51.8
Republican	Jim Bognet	165,783	48.2
Total votes		343,787	100.0
Democratic hold			

US House election, 2022: Pennsylvania's 8th Congressional District
Party	Candidate	Votes	%
Democratic	Matt Cartwright (incumbent)	146,956	51.2
Republican	Jim Bognet	139,930	48.8
Total votes		286,886	100.0
Democratic hold			

US House election, 2024: Pennsylvania's 8th Congressional District
Party	Candidate	Votes	%
Republican	Rob Bresnahan Jr.	195,663	50.8
Democratic	Matt Cartwright (incumbent)	189,411	49.2
Total votes		385,074	100.0
Republican gain from Democratic			

== See also ==
- List of United States congressional districts
- Pennsylvania's congressional districts
