= Dent Hardware Company Factory Complex =

- U.S. National Register of Historic Places
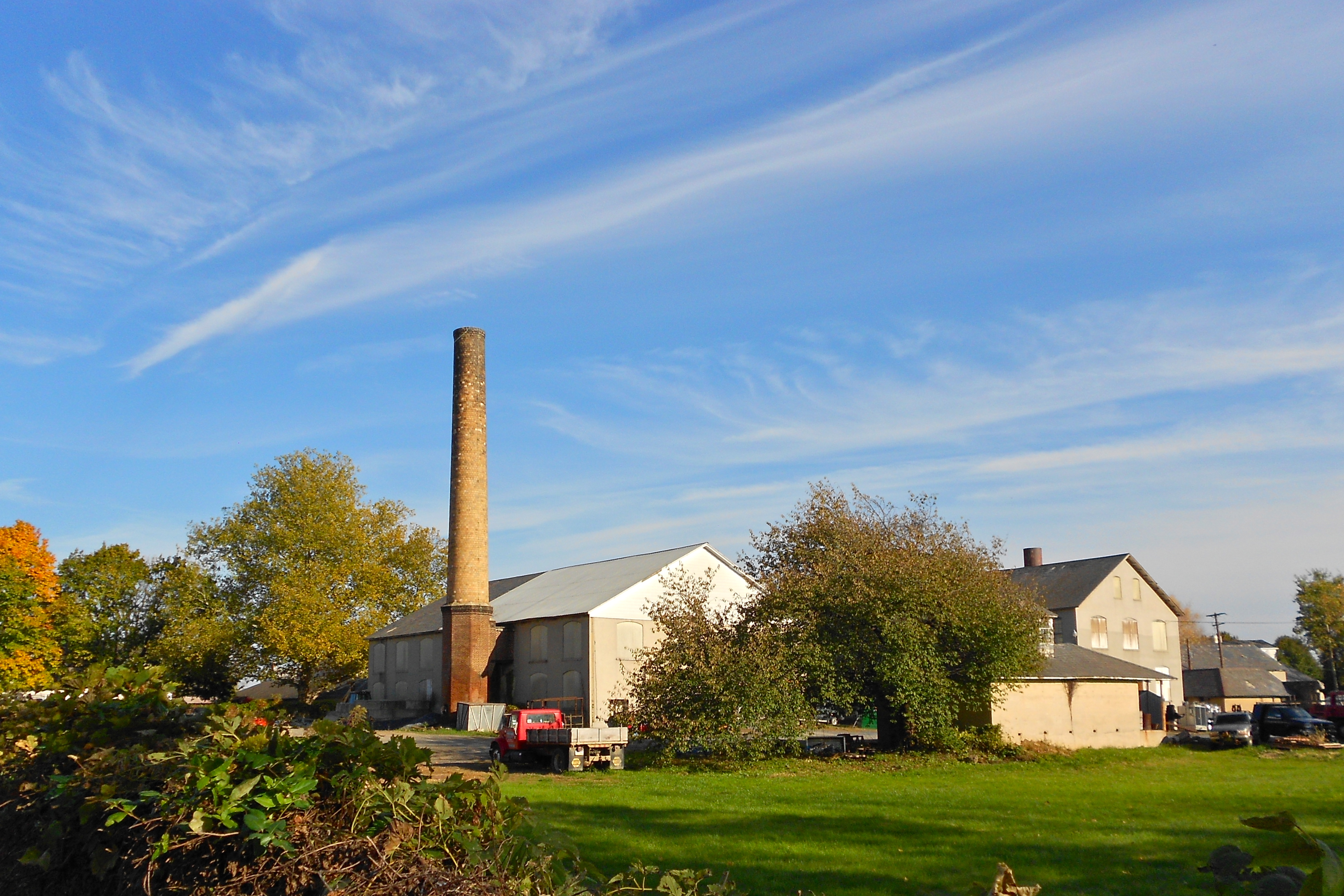
- Dent Mill Complex, October 2012

- Location within Pennsylvania Location within the United States
- Location: 1101 Third St., Fullerton, Whitehall Township, Pennsylvania, U.S.
- Coordinates: 40°38′24″N 75°28′30″W
- Area: 8.7 acres (3.5 ha)
- Built: 1894-1913
- Architect: Newhard, Henry P.
- Architectural style: Classical Revival
- NRHP reference No.: 86001772
- Added to NRHP: August 21, 1986

Dent Hardware Company Factory Complex, also known as the D.W. Coombs Textile Machinery Company, is a historic factory complex located in Whitehall Township in Lehigh County, Pennsylvania, built between 1894 and 1913 and consisting of eleven reinforced concrete buildings.

The company was the nation's leading producer of brass refrigerator hardware and one of the two largest producers of cast iron toys in Pennsylvania.

It was added to the National Register of Historic Places in 1986.
