= Robert E. Difenderfer =

American politician (1849–1923)

Robert Edward Difenderfer
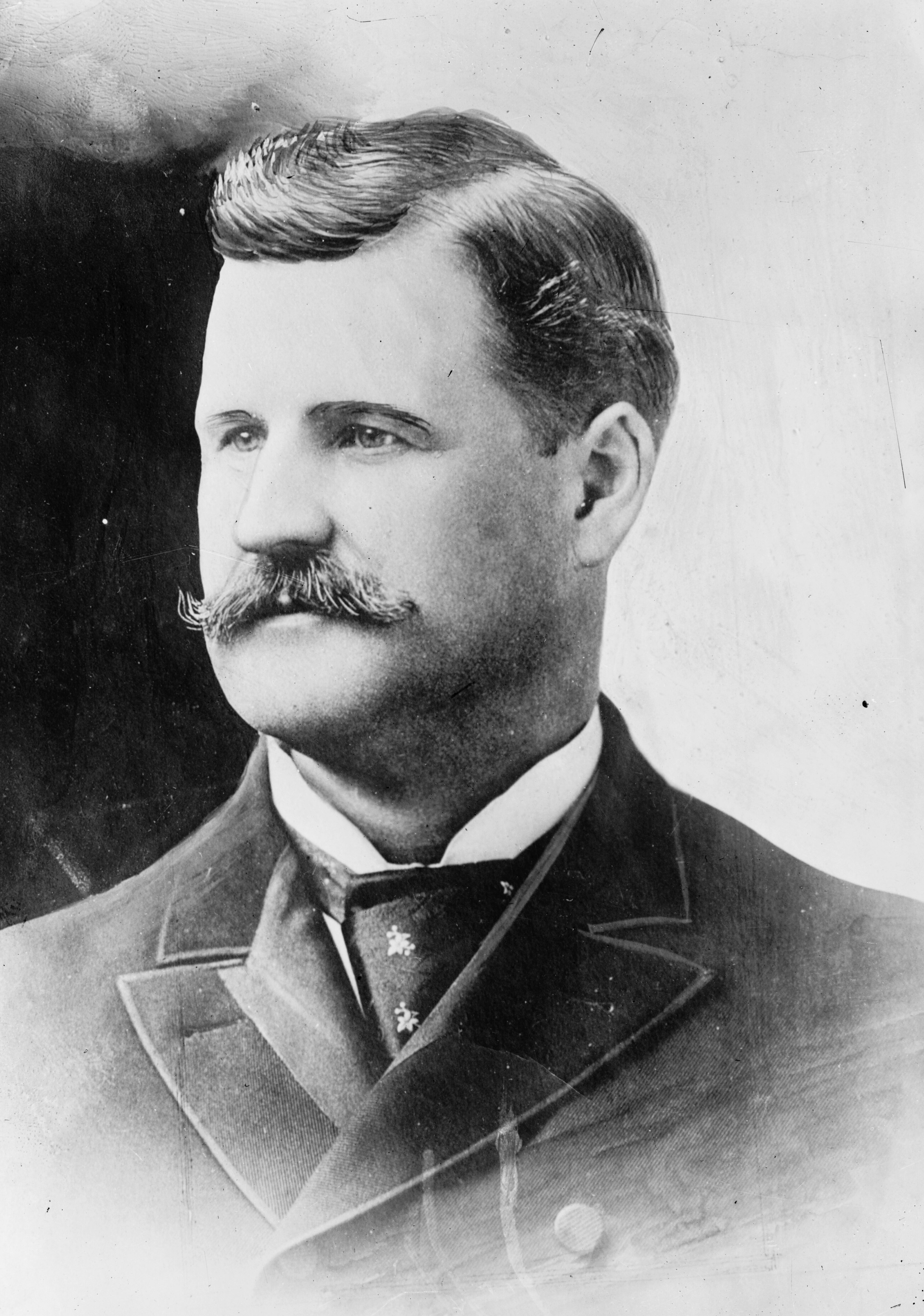

Member of the U.S. House of Representatives from Pennsylvania's 8th district
- In office March 4, 1911 – March 3, 1915
- Preceded by: Irving P. Wanger
- Succeeded by: Henry Winfield Watson

Personal details
- Born: June 7, 1849 Lewisburg, Pennsylvania, U.S.
- Died: April 25, 1923 (aged 73) Philadelphia, Pennsylvania, U.S.
- Resting place: Westminster Cemetery
- Party: Democratic
- Occupation: Politician

Robert Edward Difenderfer (June 7, 1849 – April 25, 1923) was a politician from Pennsylvania. He served as a member of the United States House of Representatives, representing the 8th district, then composing of Bucks and Montgomery counties, from 1911 to 1914.

== Early life ==
Robert Edward Difenderfer was born in Lewisburg, Pennsylvania. He attended the common schools and studied dentistry.

== Career ==
Difenderfer practiced this profession for fourteen years in Lewisburg and Pottsville, Pennsylvania. He built and operated the first woolen mill at Tianjin, China. He returned to the United States in August 1900, where he engaged in the wholesale lumber business and as a contractor at Jenkintown, Pennsylvania.

Difenderfer was elected as a Democrat to the Sixty-second and Sixty-third Congresses. He represented the 8th district, then composing of Bucks and Montgomery counties. He was an unsuccessful candidate for renomination in 1914, 1916, and 1918. He was a member of the foreign affairs and pensions committee and the Army expenditure committee. Difenderfer brought an investigation to the house committee on expenditures in the United States Department of War related to the government showing favoritism in awarding shoe contracts. in 1912, Difenderfer asked that Secretary Charles Nagel of the United States Department of Commerce and Labor investigate high coal prices. In 1914, Harry Grim defeated Difenderfer in the Democratic nomination for Congress. Difenderfer challenged the vote count and requested a recount. He was succeeded by Henry W. Watson.

He was engaged in the retail confectionery business at Jenkintown.

== Personal life ==
Difenderfer lived in Ashbourne, Pennsylvania. Difenderfer died on April 25, 1923, at his home in Philadelphia, Pennsylvania. He was interred in Westminster Cemetery.

== Sources ==
- United States Congress. "Robert E. Difenderfer (id: D000343)". Biographical Directory of the United States Congress.
- The Political Graveyard

U.S. House of Representatives
Preceded by Irving P. Wanger	Member of the U.S. House of Representatives from Pennsylvania's 8th congressional district 1911–1915	Succeeded by Henry Winfield Watson
