= Franklin H. Lichtenwalter =

American politician (1910–1973)

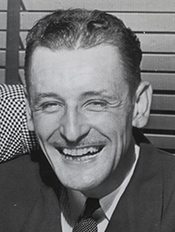

Member of the U.S. House of Representatives from Pennsylvania's 8th district
- In office September 9, 1947 – January 3, 1951
- Preceded by: Charles L. Gerlach
- Succeeded by: Albert C. Vaughn

74th Speaker of the Pennsylvania House of Representatives
- In office 1947–1973
- Preceded by: Ira T. Fiss
- Succeeded by: Herbert P. Sorg

Member of the Pennsylvania House of Representatives
- In office 1938–1947

Personal details
- Born: March 28, 1910 Pen Argyl, Pennsylvania
- Died: March 4, 1973 (aged 62) Allentown, Pennsylvania
- Party: Republican

Franklin Herbert Lichtenwalter (March 28, 1910 – March 4, 1973) was a Republican member of the U.S. House of Representatives from Pennsylvania.

== Biography ==
Franklin H. Lichtenwalter was born in Pen Argyl, Pennsylvania on March 28, 1910. Employed in the general insurance industry from 1933 to 1973, he served as a member of the Pennsylvania State House of Representatives from 1938 to 1947, as majority leader from 1943 to 1946 and as speaker in 1947.

Lichtenwalter was elected as a Republican to the 80th Congress by special election on September 9, 1947 to fill the vacancy caused by the death of Charles L. Gerlach, and was re-elected to the 81st Congress, serving from September 9, 1947, to January 3, 1951. The special election was a test case of the power of Labor potentially to reverse the Taft-Hartley Act. Pennsylvania’s Eighth District was both predominantly Republican and heavily unionized. Both Labor and anti-Labor forces spent heavily on the election, and when Lichtenwalter won with 61% of the vote, it shook the anti-Taft-Hartley movement. Lichtenwalter had not wanted to go join Congress, telling his wife after he was pushed into candidacy by party leaders, that it was “the worst thing that could ever happen to me.” He was not a candidate for renomination in 1950.

After his time in Congress, he resumed work in the insurance business and became vice president and managing director of the Pennsylvania Electric Association in Harrisburg, Pennsylvania.

U.S. House of Representatives
Preceded by Charles L. Gerlach	Member of the U.S. House of Representatives from Pennsylvania's 8th congressional district 1947–1951	Succeeded by Albert C. Vaughn
