= List of United States senators in the 82nd Congress =

This is a complete list of United States senators during the 82nd United States Congress listed by seniority from January 3, 1951, to January 3, 1953.

Order of service is based on the commencement of the senator's first term. Behind this is former service as a senator (only giving the senator seniority within their new incoming class), service as vice president, a House member, a cabinet secretary, or a governor of a state. The final factor is the population of the senator's state.

Senators who were sworn in during the middle of the two-year congressional term (up until the last senator who was not sworn in early after winning the November 1952 election) are listed at the end of the list with no number.

In this Congress, the most senior junior senator was Richard Russell. The most junior senior senator was Henry Dworshak until March 8, 1951, after which it was Earle Clements.

== Terms of service ==
Class	Terms of service of senators that expired in years
Class 1	Terms of service of senators that expired in 1953 (AZ, CA, CT, DE, FL, IN, MA, MD, ME, MI, MN, MO, MS, MT, ND, NE, NJ, NM, NV, NY, OH, PA, RI, TN, TX, UT, VA, VT, WA, WI, WV, and WY.)
Class 2	Terms of service of senators that expired in 1955 (AL, AR, CO, DE, GA, IA, ID, IL, KS, KY, LA, MA, ME, MI, MN, MS, MT, NC, NE, NH, NJ, NM, OK, OR, RI, SC, SD, TN, TX, VA, WV, and WY.)
Class 3	Terms of service of senators that expired in 1957 (AL, AR, AZ, CA, CO, CT, FL, GA, ID, IL, IN, IA, KS, KY, LA, MD, MO, NC, ND, NH, NV, NY, OH, OK, OR, PA, SC, SD, UT, VT, WA, and WI.)

== U.S. Senate seniority list ==
U.S. Senate seniority
Rank	Senator (party-state)	Seniority date	Other factors
1	Kenneth McKellar (D-TN)	March 4, 1917	
2	Walter F. George (D-GA)	November 22, 1922	
3	Carl Hayden (D-AZ)	March 4, 1927	
4	Arthur H. Vandenberg (R-MI)	March 31, 1928	
5	Tom Connally (D-TX)	March 4, 1929	
6	Richard Russell Jr. (D-GA)	January 12, 1933	
7	Harry F. Byrd Sr. (D-VA)	March 4, 1933	Former governor
8	Pat McCarran (D-NV)	March 4, 1933	
9	Joseph C. O'Mahoney (D-WY)	January 1, 1934	
10	James Murray (D-MT)	November 7, 1934	
11	Dennis Chavez (D-NM)	May 11, 1935	
12	Edwin C. Johnson (D-CO)	January 3, 1937	Former governor, Colorado 33rd in population (1930)
13	Theodore F. Green (D-RI)	January 3, 1937	Former governor, Rhode Island 37th in population (1930)
14	Styles Bridges (R-NH)	January 3, 1937	Former governor, New Hampshire 41st in population (1930)
15	Allen J. Ellender (D-LA)	January 3, 1937	
16	Joseph L. Hill (D-AL)	January 11, 1938	
17	Charles W. Tobey (R-NH)	January 3, 1939	Former representative
18	Robert A. Taft (R-OH)	January 3, 1939	Ohio 4th in population (1930)
19	Alexander Wiley (R-WI)	January 3, 1939	Wisconsin 13th in population (1930)
20	Ralph Owen Brewster (R-ME)	January 3, 1941	Former governor, Maine 35th in population (1930)
21	William Langer (R-ND)	January 3, 1941	Former governor, North Dakota 38th in population (1930)
22	Harley M. Kilgore (D-WV)	January 3, 1941	West Virginia 27th in population (1930)
23	Hugh A. Butler (R-NE)	January 3, 1941	Nebraska 32nd in population (1930)
24	Ernest McFarland (D-AZ)	January 3, 1941	Arizona 43rd in population (1930)
25	George Aiken (R-VT)	January 10, 1941	
26	Burnet R. Maybank (D-SC)	November 5, 1941	
27	Eugene D. Millikin (R-CO)	December 20, 1941	
28	James Eastland (D-MS)	January 3, 1943	Previously a senator
29	John Little McClellan (D-AR)	January 3, 1943	Former representative
30	Homer S. Ferguson (R-MI)	January 3, 1943	Michigan 7th in population (1940)
31	Kenneth S. Wherry (R-NE)	January 3, 1943	Nebraska 32nd in population (1940)
32	Guy Cordon (R-OR)	March 4, 1944	
33	Howard A. Smith (R-NJ)	December 7, 1944	
34	Warren G. Magnuson (D-WA)	December 14, 1944	
35	J. William Fulbright (D-AR)	January 3, 1945	Former representative (2 years)
36	Clyde R. Hoey (D-NC)	January 3, 1945	Former representative (1 year, 2 months)
37	Bourke B. Hickenlooper (R-IA)	January 3, 1945	Former governor, Iowa 20th in population (1940)
38	Olin D. Johnston (D-SC)	January 3, 1945	Former governor, South Carolina 26th in population (1940)
39	Homer E. Capehart (R-IN)	January 3, 1945	Indiana 12th in population (1940)
40	Brien McMahon (D-CT)	January 3, 1945	Connecticut 31st in population (1940)
41	Wayne Morse (I/R-OR)	January 3, 1945	Oregon 34th in population (1940)
42	Leverett Saltonstall (R-MA)	January 4, 1945	
43	Milton Young (R-ND)	March 12, 1945	
44	William F. Knowland (R-CA)	August 26, 1945	
45	Spessard Holland (D-FL)	September 24, 1946	
46	Ralph Flanders (R-VT)	November 1, 1946	
47	A. Willis Robertson (D-VA)	November 6, 1946	Former representative (13 years, 10 months)
48	John Sparkman (D-AL)	November 6, 1946	Former representative (9 years, 10 months)
49	Harry P. Cain (R-WA)	December 26, 1946	
50	Henry Cabot Lodge Jr. (R-MA)	January 3, 1947	Previously a senator (7 years, 1 month)
51	William E. Jenner (R-IN)	January 3, 1947	Previously a senator (2 months)
52	Edward Martin (R-PA)	January 3, 1947	Former governor, Pennsylvania 2nd in population (1940)
53	John W. Bricker (R-OH)	January 3, 1947	Former governor, Ohio 4th in population (1940)
54	Edward John Thye (R-MN)	January 3, 1947	Former governor, Minnesota 18th in population (1940)
55	Herbert O'Conor (D-MD)	January 3, 1947	Former governor, Maryland 28th in population (1940)
56	Irving Ives (R-NY)	January 3, 1947	New York 1st in population (1940)
57	James P. Kem (R-MO)	January 3, 1947	Missouri 10th in population (1940)
58	Joseph McCarthy (R-WI)	January 3, 1947	Wisconsin 13th in population (1940)
59	Zales Ecton (R-MT)	January 3, 1947	Montana 39th in population (1940)
60	Arthur Vivian Watkins (R-UT)	January 3, 1947	Utah 40th in population (1940)
61	John J. Williams (R-DE)	January 3, 1947	Delaware 47th in population (1940)
62	George W. Malone (R-NV)	January 3, 1947	Nevada 48th in population (1940)
63	John C. Stennis (D-MS)	November 17, 1947	
64	Karl Mundt (R-SD)	December 31, 1948	Former representative
65	Russell B. Long (D-LA)	December 31, 1948	
66	Matthew M. Neely (D-WV)	January 3, 1949	Previously a senator (twice) (total tenure 15 years, 10 months)
67	Guy Mark Gillette (D-IA)	January 3, 1949	Previously a senator (8 years, 2 months)
68	Virgil Chapman (D-KY)	January 3, 1949	Former representative (24 years)
69	Lyndon Johnson (D-TX)	January 3, 1949	Former representative (12 years)
70	Estes Kefauver (D-TN)	January 3, 1949	Former representative (10 years)
71	Margaret Chase Smith (R-ME)	January 3, 1949	Former representative (8 years, 7 months)
72	Clinton Anderson (D-NM)	January 3, 1949	Former representative (4 years, 5 months)
73	Robert S. Kerr (D-OK)	January 3, 1949	Former governor, Oklahoma 22nd in population (1940)
74	Andrew F. Schoeppel (R-KS)	January 3, 1949	Former governor, Kansas 29th in population (1940)
75	Lester C. Hunt (D-WY)	January 3, 1949	Former governor, Wyoming 46th in population (1940)
76	Paul Douglas (D-IL)	January 3, 1949	Illinois 3rd in population (1940)
77	Robert C. Hendrickson (R-NJ)	January 3, 1949	New Jersey 9th in population (1940)
78	Hubert Humphrey (D-MN)	January 3, 1949	Minnesota 18th in population (1940)
79	Joseph Frear Jr. (D-DE)	January 3, 1949	Delaware 47th in population (1940)
80	Henry Dworshak (R-ID)	October 14, 1949	
81	Herbert H. Lehman (D-NY)	November 9, 1949	
82	William Benton (D-CT)	December 17, 1949	
83	Frank Carlson (R-KS)	November 27, 1950	Former representative (12 years)
84	Earle C. Clements (D-KY)	November 27, 1950	Former representative (3 years)
85	Willis Smith (D-NC)	November 27, 1950	
86	Richard Nixon (R-CA)	December 1, 1950	
87	John O. Pastore (D-RI)	December 19, 1950	
88	Everett Dirksen (R-IL)	January 3, 1951	Former representative (16 years)
89	Francis H. Case (R-SD)	January 3, 1951	Former representative (14 years)
90	Almer Monroney (D-OK)	January 3, 1951	Former representative (12 years)
91	Thomas C. Hennings Jr. (D-MO)	January 3, 1951	Former representative (6 years)
92	George Smathers (D-FL)	January 3, 1951	Former representative (4 years)
93	John M. Butler (R-MD)	January 3, 1951	Maryland 28th in population (1940)
94	Wallace F. Bennett (R-UT)	January 3, 1951	Utah 40th in population (1940)
95	Herman Welker (R-ID)	January 3, 1951	Idaho 43rd in population (1940)
96	James H. Duff (R-PA)	January 16, 1951	
97	Thomas R. Underwood (D-KY)	March 19, 1951	
98	Blair Moody (D-MI)	April 23, 1951	
99	Fred Andrew Seaton (R-NE)	December 10, 1951	
100	William A. Purtell (R-CT)	August 29, 1952	
101	John Sherman Cooper (R-KY)	November 5, 1952	Previously a senator
102	Charles E. Potter (R-MI)	November 5, 1952	Former representative
103	Dwight Griswold (R-NE)	November 5, 1952	Former governor
104	Prescott Bush (R-CT)	November 5, 1952	
105	Thomas Kuchel (R-CA)	January 2, 1953	

The most senior senators by class were Kenneth McKellar (D-Tennessee) from Class 1, Richard Russell Jr. (D-Georgia) from Class 2, and Walter F. George (D-Georgia) from Class 3. Russell was the most senior senator from his class being the junior senator from his state.

== See also ==
- 82nd United States Congress
- List of United States representatives in the 82nd Congress
