= Edward G. Biester Jr. =

American politician and judge (born 1931)

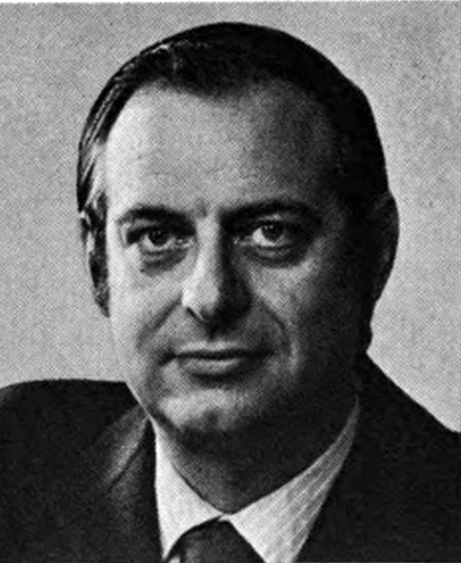

38th Attorney General of Pennsylvania
- In office January 16, 1979 – May 20, 1980
- Governor: Richard Thornburgh
- Preceded by: Justin Blewitt (acting)
- Succeeded by: Harvey Bartle III

Member of the U.S. House of Representatives from Pennsylvania's 8th district
- In office January 3, 1967 – January 3, 1977
- Preceded by: Willard S. Curtin
- Succeeded by: Peter H. Kostmayer

Personal details
- Born: Edward George Biester Jr. January 5, 1931 (age 95) Trevose, Pennsylvania, U.S.
- Party: Republican
- Education: Wesleyan University (BS); Temple University (JD)

Edward George Biester Jr. (born January 5, 1931) is an American politician and judge from Pennsylvania who served as a member of the United States House of Representatives representing Pennsylvania's 8th congressional district from 1967 to 1977. He was Pennsylvania's attorney general for from 1979 to 1980 and became a judge in 1980. He graduated from Temple University Law School in 1955.

== Biography ==
Biester graduated from George School in Newtown, Bucks County, Pennsylvania in 1948, Wesleyan University in 1952, and Temple University School of Law in 1955. He was Assistant District Attorney for Bucks County, Pennsylvania 1958 through 1964. He was elected as a Republican to the 90th and to the four succeeding Congresses. He was not a candidate for reelection in 1976. In 1977, he was elected to the Common Cause National Governing Board. He was Attorney General of Pennsylvania from 1979 to 1980.

Biester served as a judge on the Bucks County Court of Common Pleas (7th Judicial District) from 1980 to 2006 and was senior judge from 2001 to 2006. He has been a member of the Office of Military Commissions in the United States Department of Defense since 2003.

In September 2004 he was appointed to the United States Court of Military Commission Review. In April 2007, Biester joined JAMS, The Resolution Experts, as a full-time mediator and arbitrator at the JAMS Philadelphia Resolution Center at the Bell Atlantic Tower on Arch Street.

== Sources ==
- United States Congress. "Edward G. Biester Jr. (id: B000451)". Biographical Directory of the United States Congress.

U.S. House of Representatives
| Preceded by Willard S. Curtin | Member of the U.S. House of Representatives from Pennsylvania's 8th congressional district 1967–1977 | Succeeded by Peter H. Kostmayer |
Legal offices
| Preceded by Justin Blewitt; Acting | Attorney General of Pennsylvania; 1979–1980 | Succeeded by Harvey Bartle III |
U.S. order of precedence (ceremonial)
| Preceded by J.D. Hayworth as Former U.S. Representative | Order of precedence of the United States as Former U.S. Representative | Succeeded by Allyson Schwartz as Former U.S. Representative |
