= Evelyn Keppel =

American baseball player

- Catcher
- Born: June 12, 1929; Fullerton, Pennsylvania, U.S.
- Died: November 19, 2006 (aged 77); Allentown, Pennsylvania, U.S.
- Batted: Right Threw: Right

Teams
- Kenosha Comets (1947); South Bend Blue Sox (1947)

Career highlights and awards
- Women in Baseball – AAGPBL Permanent Display at Baseball Hall of Fame and Museum (1988)

Evelyn Keppel [Dorward] (June 12, 1929 – November 19, 2006) played in the All-American Girls Professional Baseball League (AAGPBL) in 1947. She was a catcher who both batted and threw right-handed.

== Personal life ==
Keppel was born in Fullerton, Pennsylvania to Evelyn (née Beck) and Luis Keppel Sr. She married Carl Pete W. Dorward, who died in 2004. Apart from her love for baseball, she was a homemaker with an interest in religion. In her later years, Keppel was a member of the Sacred Heart of Jesus Catholic Church, in Allentown.

== Baseball career ==
Although Keppel only played baseball professionally for one year, 1947, she did so for two teams. She began as a catcher for the Kenosha Comets, but was later traded to the South Bend Blue Sox.

== Batting ==
Year	G	AB	R	H	2B	3B	HR	RBI	SB	BB	SO	AVG
1947	-	-	-	-	-	-	-	-	-	-	-	-
