= Willard S. Curtin =

American politician (1905–1996)

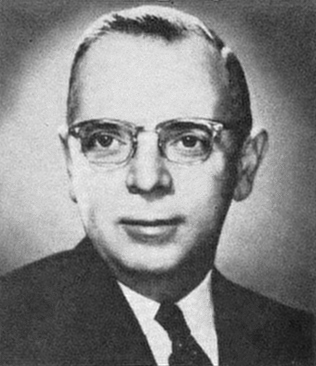

Member of the U.S. House of Representatives from Pennsylvania's 8th district
- In office January 3, 1957 – January 3, 1967
- Preceded by: Karl C. King
- Succeeded by: Edward G. Biester, Jr.

Personal details
- Born: November 28, 1905 Trenton, New Jersey
- Died: February 4, 1996 (aged 90) Fort Myers, Florida
- Party: Republican

Willard Sevier Curtin (November 28, 1905 – February 4, 1996) was a Republican member of the U.S. House of Representatives from Pennsylvania.

Willard S. Curtin was born in Trenton, New Jersey. He moved to Morrisville, Bucks County, Pennsylvania, with his parents in 1911. He graduated from Penn State University in 1929 and from the University of Pennsylvania Law School in 1932.

Curtin served as assistant district attorney of Bucks County, Pennsylvania from 1938 to 1949, and as district attorney from 1949 to 1953. He was a county committeeman to the Pennsylvania State Republican Committee from 1954 to 1956.

Curtin was elected as a Republican to the Eighty-fifth and to the four succeeding Congresses. He defeated noted author (and Doylestown, Bucks County native) James A. Michener in the 1962 election. He was not a candidate for reelection in 1966. Curtin voted in favor of the Civil Rights Acts of 1957, 1960, and 1964, as well as the 24th Amendment to the U.S. Constitution and the Voting Rights Act of 1965.

== Sources ==
- United States Congress. "Willard S. Curtin (id: C001005)". Biographical Directory of the United States Congress.

U.S. House of Representatives
Preceded by Karl C. King	Member of the U.S. House of Representatives from Pennsylvania's 8th congressional district 1957-1967	Succeeded by Edward G. Biester, Jr.
