= Henry Winfield Watson =

American politician (1856–1933)

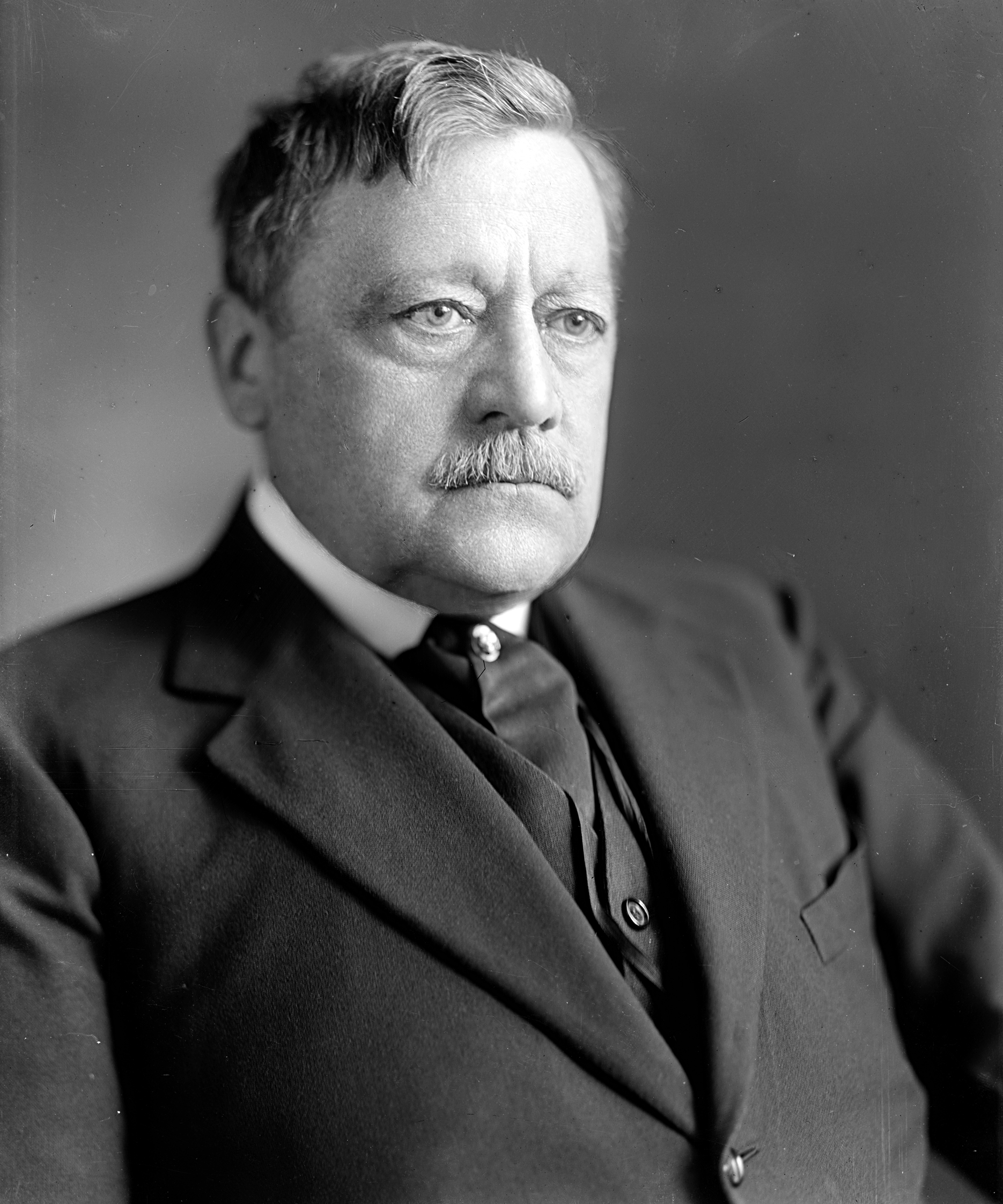

Member of the U.S. House of Representatives from Pennsylvania
- In office March 4, 1915 – August 27, 1933
- Preceded by: Robert E. Difenderfer (8th); William W. Griest (9th)
- Succeeded by: Thomas S. Butler (8th); Oliver W. Frey (9th)
- Constituency: 8th district (1915-23); 9th district (1923-33)

Personal details
- Born: June 24, 1856 Bucks County, Pennsylvania, U.S.
- Died: August 27, 1933 (aged 77) Langhorne, Pennsylvania, U.S.
- Resting place: Wilmington and Brandywine Cemetery; Wilmington, Delaware, U.S.
- Party: Republican
- Occupation: Politician; lawyer; banker
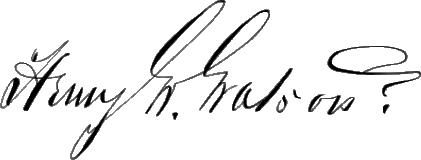
- Signature

Henry Winfield Watson (June 24, 1856 – August 27, 1933) was a Republican member of the U.S. House of Representatives from Pennsylvania, representing the 8th congressional district.

== Early life ==
Henry Winfield Watson was born on June 24, 1856, in Bucks County, Pennsylvania. He was educated in private schools, studied law, was admitted to the bar in 1881.

== Career ==
Watson commenced the practice of his profession in Philadelphia. He purchased the Washington, Potomac & Chesapeake Railway Company in 1909 and served as its president. He was the director of several banks and of the Langhorne Water Company.

Watson was elected as a Republican to the Sixty-fourth in 1914, succeeding Robert Edward Difenderfer, and to the nine succeeding Congresses, serving from 1915 to his death in 1933. He represented the 8th congressional district, then representing Bucks and Montgomery counties.

== Personal life ==
Watson died on August 27, 1933, in Langhorne, Pennsylvania. He was interred in the Wilmington and Brandywine Cemetery, Wilmington, Delaware.

== See also ==
- List of members of the United States Congress who died in office (1900–1949)

== Sources ==
- United States Congress. "Henry W. Watson (id: W000201)". Biographical Directory of the United States Congress.
- The Political Graveyard

U.S. House of Representatives
| Preceded by Robert E. Difenderfer | Member of the U.S. House of Representatives from Pennsylvania's 8th congressional district 1915–1923 | Succeeded by Thomas S. Butler |
| Preceded by William W. Griest | Member of the U.S. House of Representatives from Pennsylvania's 9th congressional district 1923–1933 | Succeeded by Oliver W. Frey |
