= Oliver W. Frey =

American politician (1887–1939)

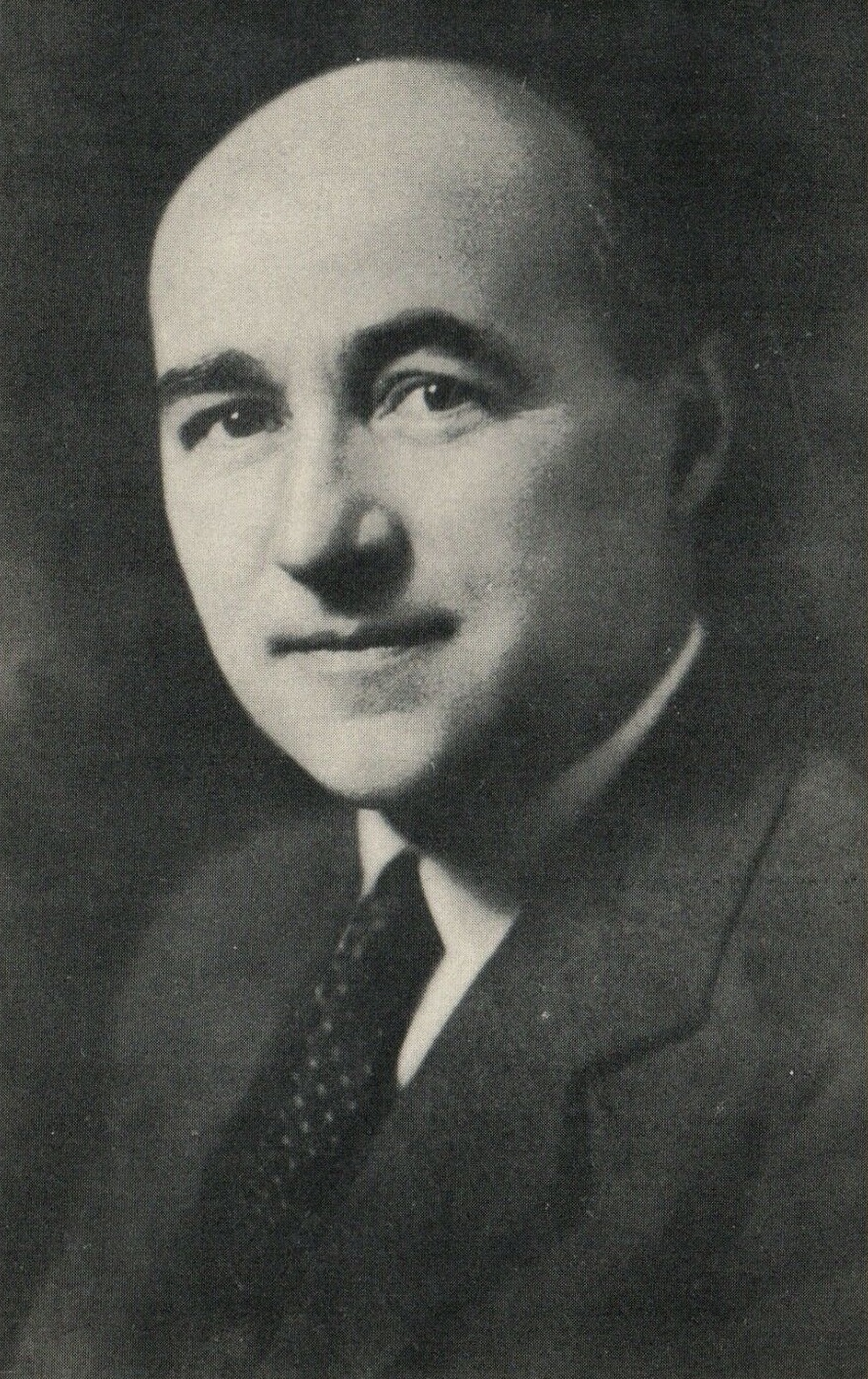
- US House of Representatives photo, circa 1938.

Member of the U.S. House of Representatives from Pennsylvania's 9th district
- In office November 7, 1933 – January 3, 1939
- Preceded by: Henry Winfield Watson
- Succeeded by: Charles L. Gerlach

Personal details
- Born: Oliver Walter Frey; September 7, 1887 Quakertown, Pennsylvania
- Died: August 26, 1939 (aged 51) Allentown, Pennsylvania
- Resting place: Grandview Cemetery in Allentown
- Party: Democratic
- Education: College of William & Mary; University of Pennsylvania Law School

Military service
- Allegiance: United States
- Branch/service: United States Army
- Rank: First Lieutenant
- Battles/wars: World War I

Oliver Walter Frey (September 7, 1887 – August 26, 1939) was an American lawyer, politician, and World War I veteran who served three terms as a Democratic member of the U.S. House of Representatives from Pennsylvania from 1933 to 1939.

== Biography ==
Frey was born near Quakertown, Pennsylvania. He moved to Ohio with his parents in 1891 and to Allentown, Pennsylvania, in 1893. He graduated from the College of William and Mary in Williamsburg, Virginia, in 1915.

=== World War I ===
During the First World War he enlisted in the United States Army. He was commissioned a first lieutenant in the 314th Infantry, serving overseas in the 79th Division. He served from April 1917 until honorably discharged in June 1919.

Frey resumed his studies at the University of Pennsylvania and graduated from its law department in 1920.

=== Congress ===
Frey was elected as a Democrat to the Seventy-third Congress to fill the vacancy caused by the death of Henry Winfield Watson. He was reelected to the Seventy-fourth and Seventy-fifth Congresses. He was an unsuccessful candidate for reelection in 1938.

=== Later career ===
After his time in Congress he worked as general counsel for the Farm Credit Administration in Baltimore, Maryland, from April 1939 until his death.

=== Death and burial ===
He died in Allentown, Pennsylvania on August 26, 1939 at the age of 51. He was interred in Grandview Cemetery in Allentown.

U.S. House of Representatives
Preceded by Henry Winfield Watson	Member of the U.S. House of Representatives from Pennsylvania's 9th congressional district November 7, 1933 – January 3, 1939	Succeeded by Charles L. Gerlach
