= Albert C. Vaughn =

American politician (1894–1951)

Albert Vaughn
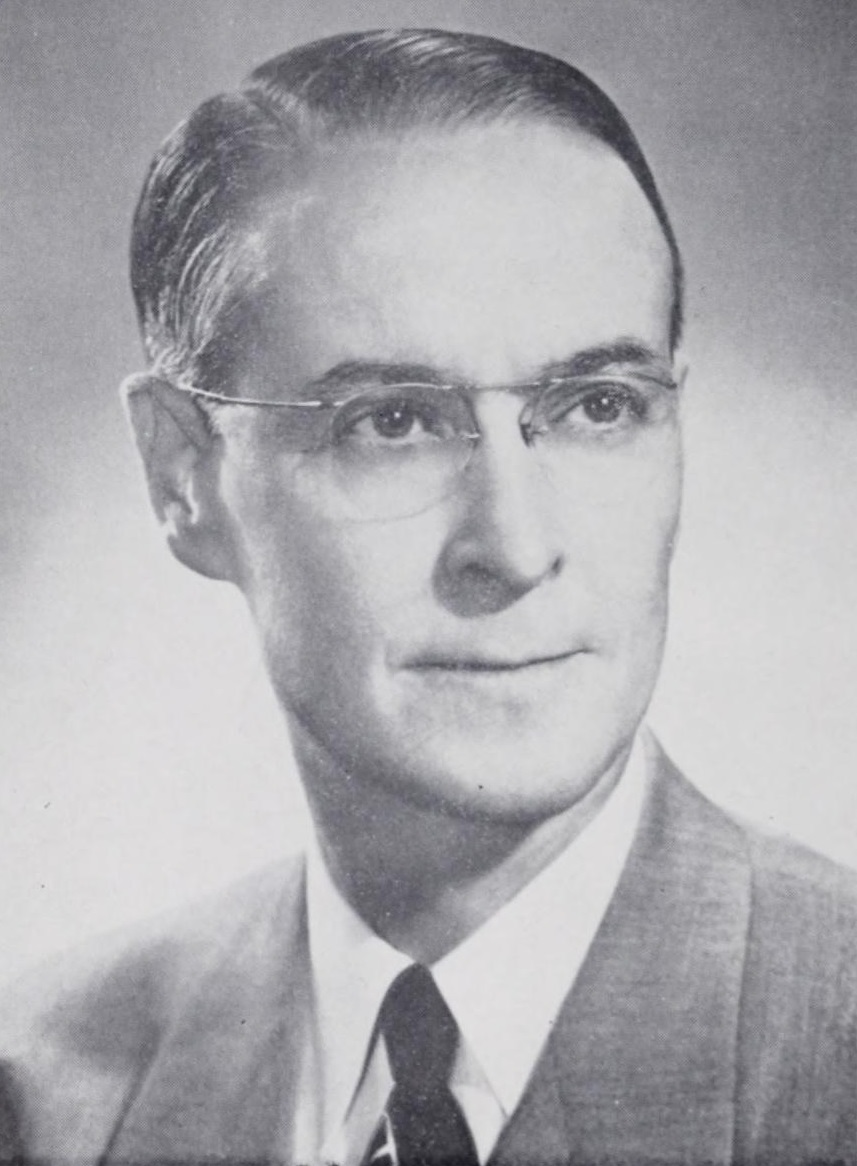

Member of the U.S. House of Representatives from Pennsylvania's 8th district
- In office January 3, 1951 – September 1, 1951
- Preceded by: Franklin H. Lichtenwalter
- Succeeded by: Karl C. King

Personal details
- Born: October 9, 1894 West Catasauqua, Pennsylvania, U.S.
- Died: September 1, 1951 (aged 56) Fullerton, Pennsylvania, U.S.

Military service
- Branch/service: United States Navy
- Battles/wars: World War II

Albert Clinton Vaughn Sr. (October 9, 1894 – September 1, 1951) was an American politician who served as a member of the U.S. House of Representatives from Pennsylvania.

== Early life and education ==
Vaughn was born in West Catasauqua, Pennsylvania. He graduated from Allentown Business College in Allentown, Pennsylvania, in 1911, and also completed an extension course in business administration.

== Career ==
During World War II, he served as a yeoman in the United States Navy. For twenty-five years, he was engaged in private industry, including engineering, administrative, and sales positions. He was elected a school director in Whitehall Township, Pennsylvania, in 1929 for a six-year term. He served as an executive assistant to Representative Charles L. Gerlach in 1945 and to Representative Franklin H. Lichtenwalter in 1947.

Vaughn was elected as a Republican to the 82nd Congress and served from January 3, 1951, until his death on September 1, 1951, in Fullerton, Pennsylvania. He was interred at Fairview Cemetery in West Catasauqua, Pennsylvania.

== See also ==
- List of members of the United States Congress who died in office (1950–1999)

U.S. House of Representatives
Preceded by Franklin H. Lichtenwalter	Member of the U.S. House of Representatives from Pennsylvania's 8th congressional district January 3, 1951 - September 1, 1951	Succeeded by Karl C. King
