= Charles L. Gerlach =

American politician (1895–1947)

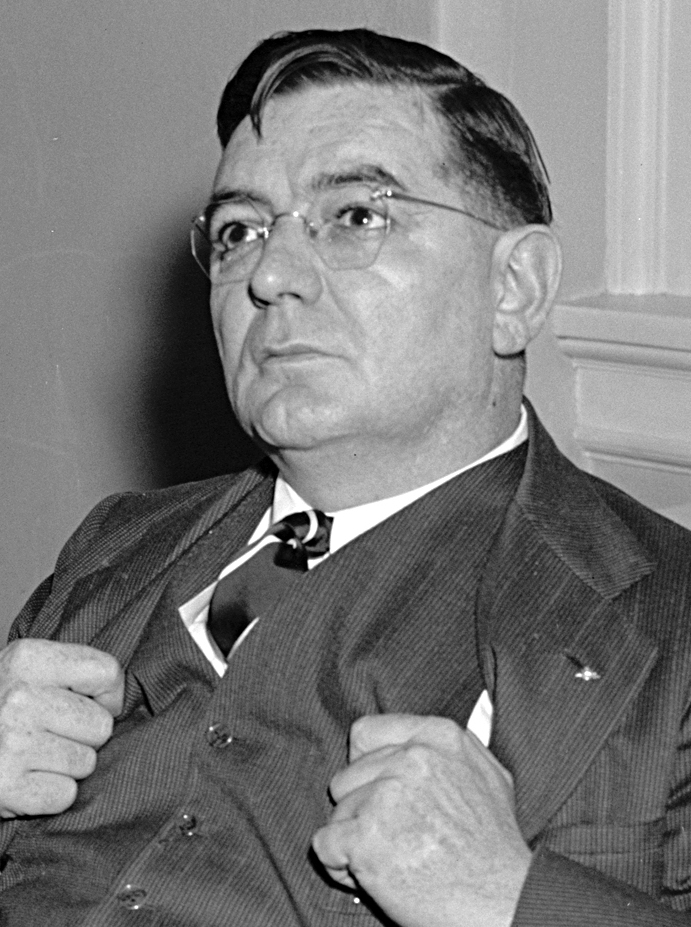
- Gerlach in September 1939

Member of the U.S. House of Representatives from Pennsylvania
- In office January 3, 1939 – May 5, 1947
- Preceded by: Oliver W. Frey
- Succeeded by: Franklin H. Lichtenwalter
- Constituency: 9th district (1939–1945); 8th district (1945–1947)

Personal details
- Born: Charles Lewis Gerlach; September 14, 1895 Bethlehem, Pennsylvania, U.S.
- Died: May 5, 1947 (aged 51) Allentown, Pennsylvania, U.S.
- Resting place: Greenwood Cemetery in Allentown
- Party: Republican

Charles Lewis Gerlach (September 14, 1895 – May 5, 1947) was an American businessman and politician who served five terms as a Republican member of the U.S. House of Representatives from Pennsylvania from 1939 until his death in 1947.

== Biography ==
Gerlach was born in Bethlehem, Pennsylvania, on September 14, 1895. In 1914, he moved to Allentown, Pennsylvania, where he became the organizer, and later president, of a fuel and heating supply company.

=== Congress ===
A Republican State committeeman in 1936 and 1937, he was elected to the 76th Congress in 1938, and served until his 1947 death in Allentown.

A confidential 1943 analysis of the House Foreign Affairs Committee by Isaiah Berlin for the British Foreign Office described Gerlach as:

A newcomer to the committee. A rugged Isolationist before Pearl Harbor, who voted only for purely defensive measures, such as conscription and arming of United States ships. Though he opposed the original Lend-Lease, he favoured its continuation, but would be difficult to say exactly where he stands on the larger questions of post-war American policy.

== Death and burial ==
On May 5, 1947, while still serving in Congress, Gerlach died in Allentown, Pennsylvania, at age 51. He was interred in Greenwood Cemetery in Allentown.

== See also ==
- List of members of the United States Congress who died in office (1900–1949)

U.S. House of Representatives
| Preceded by Oliver W. Frey | Member of the U.S. House of Representatives from Pennsylvania's 9th congressional district 1939–1945 | Succeeded by J. Roland Kinzer |
| Preceded by James Wolfenden | Member of the U.S. House of Representatives from Pennsylvania's 8th congressional district 1945–1947 | Succeeded by Franklin H. Lichtenwalter |
