= Karl C. King =

American politician (1897–1974)

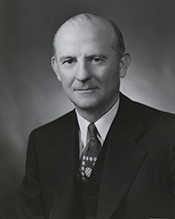

Member of the U.S. House of Representatives from Pennsylvania's 8th district
- In office November 6, 1951 – January 3, 1957
- Preceded by: Albert C. Vaughn
- Succeeded by: Willard S. Curtin

Personal details
- Born: January 26, 1897 Plevna, Kansas, U.S.
- Died: April 16, 1974 (aged 77) Philadelphia, Pennsylvania, U.S.
- Party: Republican
- Education: Kansas State Teachers College; Columbia University; Wharton School of Business

Karl Clarence King (January 26, 1897 – April 16, 1974) was a Republican member of the U.S. House of Representatives from Pennsylvania.

== Biography ==
Karl C. King was born in Plevna, Kansas. He attended the Kansas State Teachers College at Emporia, Kansas, Columbia University in New York City, and the Wharton School of Business.

During the First World War, King served in the United States Navy. He worked as a newspaper reporter in Kansas City, New York, and Philadelphia. He was engaged in farming and the farm supply business at Morrisville, Bucks County, Pennsylvania in 1922.

King was elected as a Republican to the 82nd Congress, by special election, November 6, 1951, to fill the vacancy caused by the death of Albert C. Vaughn. He was re-elected to the two succeeding Congresses, but was not a candidate for re-nomination in 1956. He authored his autobiography, titled Prairie Dogs and Postulates.

U.S. House of Representatives
Preceded by Albert C. Vaughn	Member of the U.S. House of Representatives from Pennsylvania's 8th congressional district 1951–1957	Succeeded by Willard S. Curtin
