= Fullerton, Pennsylvania =

Unincorporated community in Pennsylvania, US

- Census-designated place
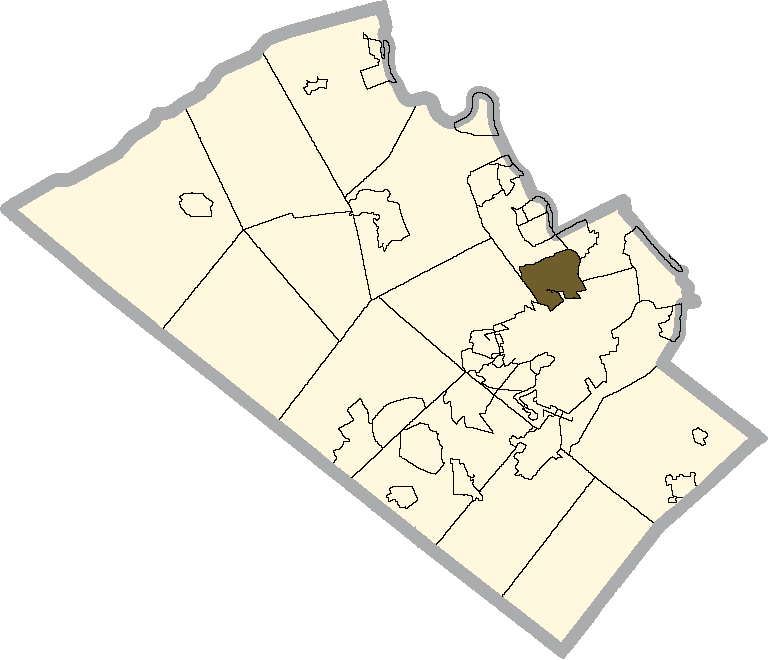
- Location of Fullerton in Lehigh County, Pennsylvania

- Location of Fullerton in Pennsylvania Location in the United States
- Coordinates: 40°37′55″N 75°28′22″W
- Country: United States
- State: Pennsylvania
- County: Lehigh
- Township: Whitehall

Area
  - Census-designated place: 3.75 sq mi (9.72 km^{2})
  - Land: 3.67 sq mi (9.50 km^{2})
  - Water: 0.081 sq mi (0.21 km^{2})
- Elevation: 375 ft (114 m)

Population (2020)
  - Census-designated place: 16,588
  - Density: 4,521/sq mi (1,745.4/km^{2})
  - Metro: 865,310 (US: 68th)
- Time zone: UTC-5 (EST)
  - Summer (DST): UTC-4 (EDT)
- ZIP Code: 18052
- Area code: 610
- FIPS code: 42-28144
- GNIS feature ID: 1175328

Fullerton is an unincorporated area and census-designated place (CDP) in Whitehall Township, Pennsylvania. The population of Fullerton was 16,588 as of the 2020 census.

Fullerton is a suburb of Allentown in the Lehigh Valley metropolitan area, which had a population of 861,899 and was the 68th-most populous metropolitan area in the U.S. as of the 2020 census.

== History ==
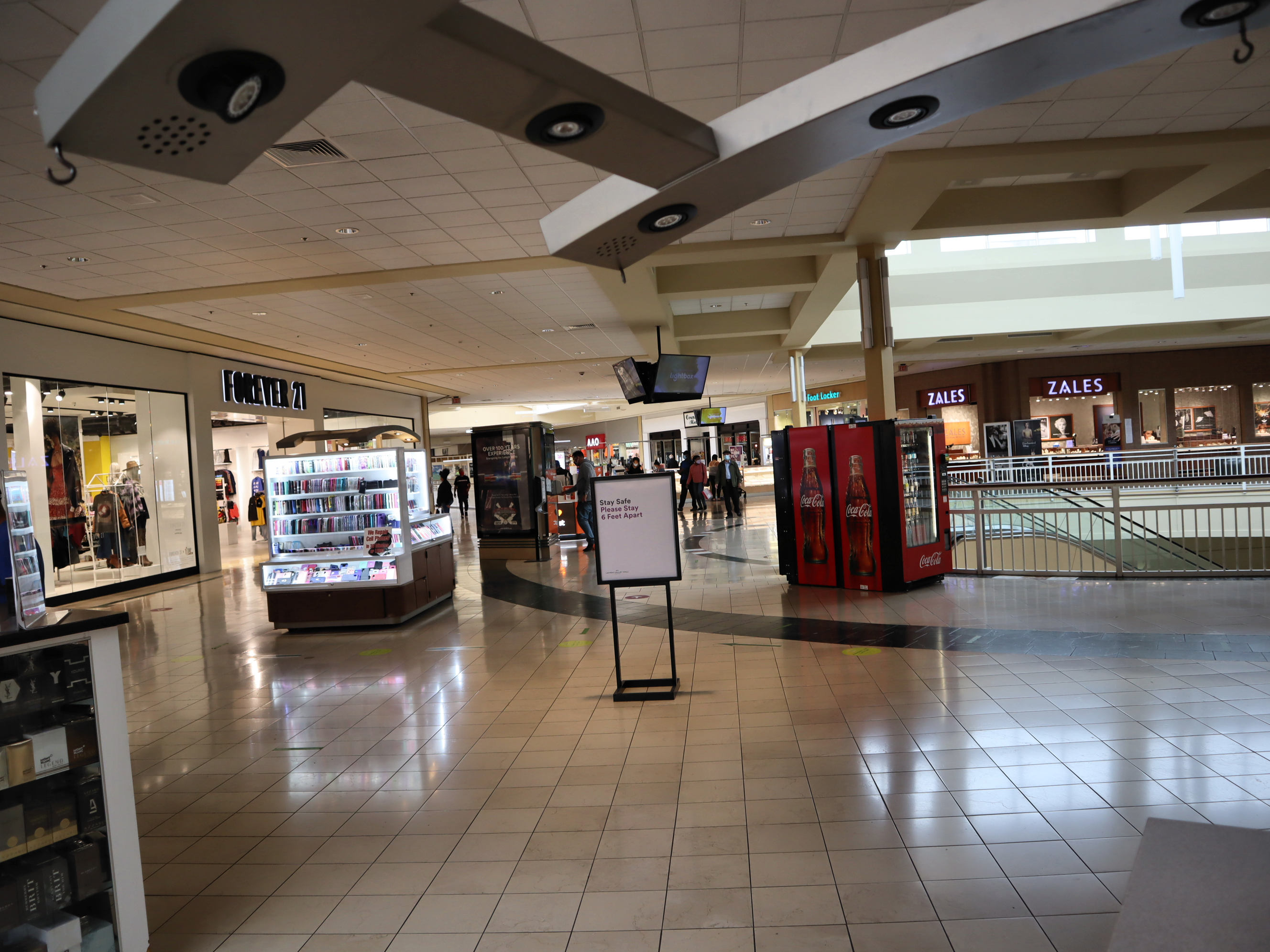
Lehigh Valley Mall in Fullerton, the largest shopping mall in the Lehigh Valley with 146 stores

Originally known as "Ferndale", the town was located on tracts of land originally settled by Giles Windsor (1767), Stephen Snyder (1786) and Jacob Yundt (1826). In 1895, the town was renamed "Fullerton" in honor of local businessman James W. Fuller Jr., who had purchased the railroad car wheel factory of Frederick & Company in 1865 and operated it as McKee, Fuller & Co. and later the Lehigh Car, Wheel & Axle Works. Fuller laid out the hamlet in 1870, and by 1883 it was a thriving company town with a population in excess of 1,500 men and their families. When the Lehigh Valley cement industry exploded in the early 1900s, Fuller's company prospered by providing machinery to the mills in the region, and the town supplied the workforce for both his factories, and the numerous mills and quarries operating in the immediate area.

The Dent Hardware Company Factory Complex in Fullerton was listed on the National Register of Historic Places in 1986.

== Geography ==
Fullerton is located in eastern Lehigh County at 40°37′53″N 75°28′49″W (40.631297, -75.480215), in the southern part of Whitehall Township. It is bordered to the south by the city of Allentown and to the east by the Lehigh River. To the northeast, across the Lehigh River, is the borough of Catasauqua.

U.S. Route 22, the Lehigh Valley Thruway, runs through central Fullerton, with two interchanges in the community: one with Pennsylvania Route 145 (MacArthur Road) and the other with Fullerton Avenue/Third Street. US-22 leads east 14 miles (23 km) to Easton and west with Interstate 78 82 miles (132 km) to Harrisburg, the state capital. PA-145 leads south 2 miles (3 km) to the center of Allentown and north 14 miles (23 km) to Walnutport. The Lehigh Valley Mall is located in Fullerton on the northeastern side of the US-22/PA-145 interchange.

According to the U.S. Census Bureau, Fullerton has a total area of 3.7 square miles (9.7 km^{2}), of which 3.7 square miles (9.5 km^{2}) are land and 0.1 square miles (0.2 km^{2}), or 2.23%, are water. The community is drained by the Lehigh River and its tributary, Jordan Creek.

== Demographics ==
Historical population
Census	Pop.	Note	%±
2000	14,268		—
2010	14,925		4.6%
2020	16,588		11.1%

=== 2020 census ===
As of the 2020 census, Fullerton had a population of 16,588. The median age was 37.8 years. 21.9% of residents were under the age of 18 and 16.8% of residents were 65 years of age or older. For every 100 females there were 90.8 males, and for every 100 females age 18 and over there were 88.0 males age 18 and over.

100.0% of residents lived in urban areas, while 0.0% lived in rural areas.

There were 6,517 households in Fullerton, of which 31.5% had children under the age of 18 living in them. Of all households, 42.7% were married-couple households, 17.9% were households with a male householder and no spouse or partner present, and 31.2% were households with a female householder and no spouse or partner present. About 28.0% of all households were made up of individuals and 11.9% had someone living alone who was 65 years of age or older.

There were 6,722 housing units, of which 3.0% were vacant. The homeowner vacancy rate was 0.7% and the rental vacancy rate was 3.2%.

Racial composition as of the 2020 census
Race	Number	Percent
White	9,714	58.6%
Black or African American	1,979	11.9%
American Indian and Alaska Native	84	0.5%
Asian	1,036	6.2%
Native Hawaiian and Other Pacific Islander	4	0.0%
Some other race	2,010	12.1%
Two or more races	1,761	10.6%
Hispanic or Latino (of any race)	4,229	25.5%

=== 2000 census ===
As of the 2000 census, there were 14,268 people, 6,224 households, and 3,827 families residing in the CDP. The population density was 3,815.5 inhabitants per square mile (1,473.2/km^{2}). There were 6,484 housing units at an average density of 1,733.9 per square mile (669.5/km^{2}). The racial makeup of the CDP was 86.09% White, 3.88% African American, 0.16% Native American, 5.52% Asian, 0.07% Pacific Islander, 2.57% from other races, and 1.70% from two or more races. Hispanic or Latino of any race were 6.15% of the population.

Ancestries: German (28.3%), Italian (11.8%), Irish (10.8%), Arab (5.6%), Slovak (5.3%), English (5.0%).

There were 6,224 households, out of which 24.2% had children under the age of 18 living with them, 48.7% were married couples living together, 9.1% had a female householder with no husband present, and 38.5% were non-families. 31.7% of all households were made up of individuals, and 11.2% had someone living alone who was 65 years of age or older. The average household size was 2.27 and the average family size was 2.87.

In Fullerton, the population was spread out, with 19.6% under the age of 18, 8.2% from 18 to 24, 31.3% from 25 to 44, 21.9% from 45 to 64, and 19.0% who were 65 years of age or older. The median age was 39 years. For every 100 females, there were 92.3 males. For every 100 females age 18 and over, there were 89.0 males. The median income for a household in the CDP was $43,048, and the median income for a family was $50,147. Males had a median income of $40,305 versus $27,230 for females. The per capita income for the CDP was $22,164. About 4.6% of families and 7.3% of the population were below the poverty line, including 8.3% of those under age 18 and 6.3% of those age 65 or over.

== Education ==
Fullerton is part of the Whitehall-Coplay School District. Students in grades nine through 12 attend Whitehall High School.

== Notable people ==
- Evelyn Keppel, former All-American Girls Professional Baseball League baseball player
- Dave Steckel, former college football player and coach
- Albert C. Vaughn, former U.S. Representative
