= 2021 Lehigh County Executive election =

- November 2, 2021

Nominee	Phillips Armstrong	Glenn Eckhart
Party	Democratic	Republican
Popular vote	36,873	34,255
Percentage	51.79%	48.11%
- Precinct results Armstrong: 50–60% 60–70% 70–80% 80–90% Eckhart: 50–60% 60–70% 70–80%
County Executive before election
Phillips Armstrong
Democratic
Elected County Executive
Phillips Armstrong
Democratic

The 2021 Lehigh County Executive election was held on November 2, 2021. Incumbent Democratic County Executive Phillips Armstrong ran for re-election to a second term. He won the Democratic primary unopposed and faced the Republican nominee, former County Controller Glenn Eckhart, in the general election. Armstrong defeated Eckhart by a narrow margin, winning re-election with 52 percent of the vote.

== Democratic primary ==
=== Candidates ===
- Phillips Armstrong, incumbent County Executive

=== Results ===
Democratic primary results
Party	Candidate	Votes	%
Democratic	Phillips Armstrong (incumbent)	22,302	99.31%
Democratic	Write-in	154	0.69%
Total votes		22,456	100.00%

== Republican primary ==
=== Candidates ===
- Glenn Eckhart, former County Controller, 2017 Republican candidate for County Executive

=== Results ===
Republican primary results
Party	Candidate	Votes	%
Republican	Glenn Eckhart	18,482	99.10%
Republican	Write-in	167	0.90%
Total votes		18,649	100.00%

== General election ==
=== Results ===
2021 Lehigh County Executive election
Party	Candidate	Votes	%
Democratic	Phillips Armstrong (incumbent)	36,873	51.79%
Republican	Glenn Eckhart	34,255	48.11%
Write-in		74	0.10%
Total votes		71,202	100.00%
Democratic hold			
