= 2017 Lehigh County Executive election =

- November 7, 2017

Nominee	Phillips Armstrong	Brad Osborne
Party	Democratic	Republican
Popular vote	25,085	22,546
Percentage	52.62%	47.30%
County Executive before election
Tom Muller
Democratic
Elected County Executive
Phillips Armstrong
Democratic

The 2017 Lehigh County Executive election was held on November 7, 2017. Incumbent Democratic County Executive Tom Muller declined to seek re-election to a second term, instead endorsing Whitehall Township Commissioner Phillips Armstrong as his successor. Armstrong won the Democratic primary unopposed. County Commissioner Brad Osborne defeated County Controller Glenn Eckhart to win the Republican nomination, 56–44 percent, and faced Armstrong in the general election. Armstrong defeated Osborne by a thin margin, winning his first term as County Executive with 53 percent of the vote.

== Democratic primary ==
=== Candidates ===
- Phillips Armstrong, Whitehall Township Commissioner

=== Results ===
Democratic primary results
Party	Candidate	Votes	%
Democratic	Phillips Armstrong	11,695	100.00%
Total votes		11,695	100.00%

== Republican primary ==
=== Candidates ===
- Brad Osborne, County Commissioner
- Glenn Eckhart, County Controller

=== Results ===
Republican primary results
Party	Candidate	Votes	%
Republican	Brad Osborne	6,453	56.14%
Republican	Glenn Eckhart	5,041	43.86%
Total votes		11,494	100.00%

== General election ==
=== Results ===
2017 Lehigh County Executive election
Party	Candidate	Votes	%
Democratic	Phillips Armstrong	25,085	52.62%
Republican	Brad Osborne	22,546	47.30%
Write-in		40	0.08%
Total votes		47,671	100.00%
Democratic hold			
