= Adams Island =

Adams Island may refer to:

- Adams Island (Antarctica), in McDonald Bay
- Adams Island (Massachusetts), United States
- Adams Island (New Zealand), in the Auckland Islands archipelago
- Adams Island (Nunavut), Canada
- Adams Island (Pennsylvania), United States

== See also ==
- Adam's Island, Israel
