= List of historic places in Allentown, Pennsylvania =

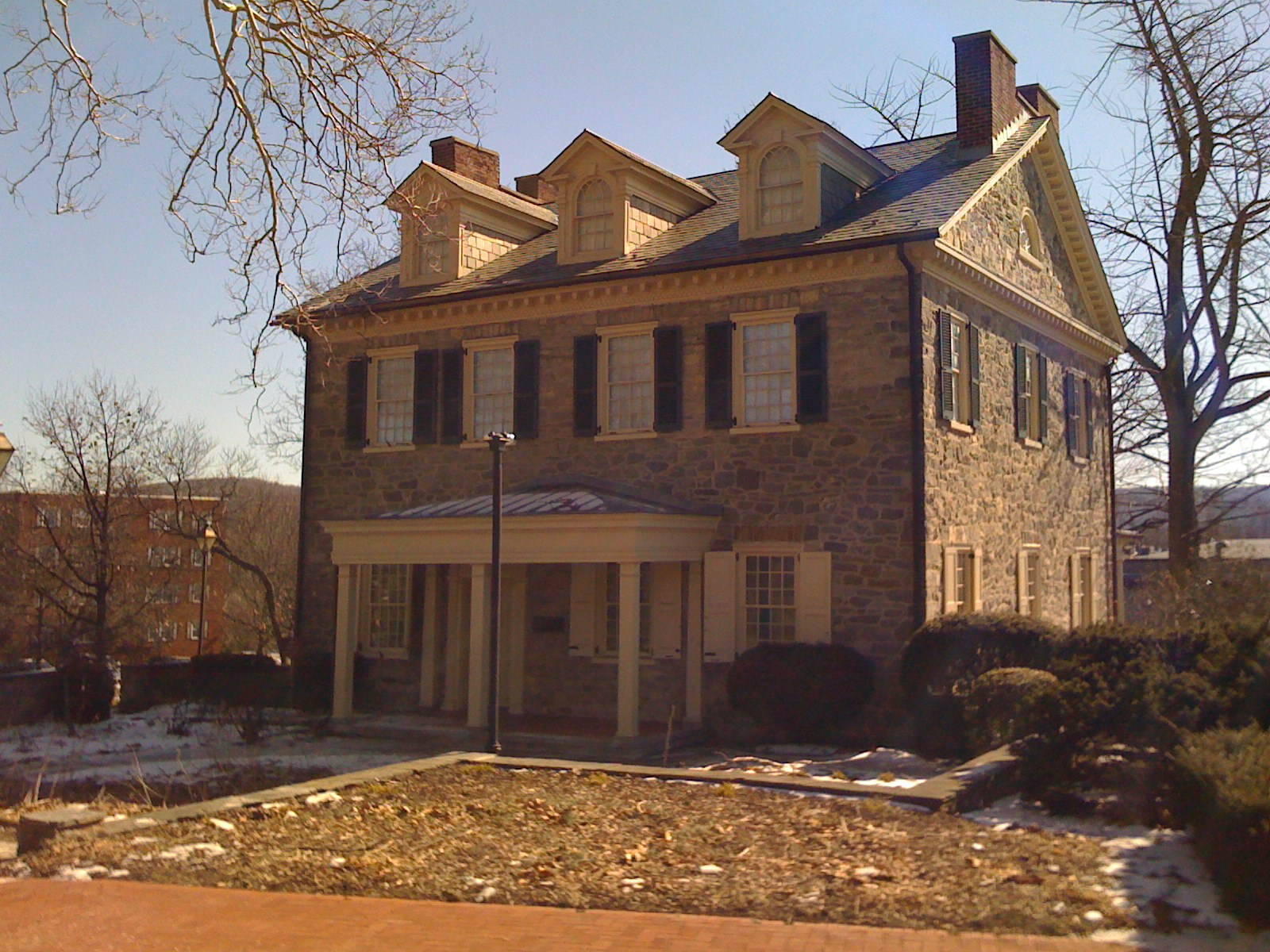
Trout Hall, built in 1770 by James Allen, the son of Allentown founder William Allen, is the oldest house in Allentown

Allentown, Pennsylvania, established in 1762, the third-largest city in Pennsylvania and largest city in the Lehigh Valley region of eastern Pennsylvania.

Allentown is one of the oldest major cities in the United States with deep roots in the nation's history. The city was the hiding place of the Liberty Bell for nine months during the American Revolutionary War, and the city's oldest cemetery includes the gravesites of American patriots who served in the Continental Army, Union Army, and later wars.

The following 18 places in Allentown have been named to National Register of Historic Places:

== Locations ==
=== National Register of Historic Places ===
- Albertus L. Meyers Bridge (1913)

Added 1988 - NRHP #88000870
Corner of 8th and Union Streets
Map location: 40°35′47″N 075°28′16″W
Large concrete multi-arch bridge first opened as a toll bridge in November 1913 by the Lehigh Valley Transit Company as a streetcar and interurban trolley bridge. Construction began in 1911, and when opened, it was the longest and highest reinforced concrete arch bridge in the world. Automobile traffic was charged a toll to cross the bridge until the mid 1950s. Commonly called the 8th Street Bridge, its current name honors the long-time Allentown Band director, Albertus ("Bert") L. Meyers, who played in the band at the bridge's opening.

- Allentown Masonic Temple (1925)

Added 2004, NRHP: #04000402
1524 W. Linden Street
Map location: 40°35′54″N 075°29′23″W
Historic Masonic Temple built between 1923 and 1925. Built in Neoclassical style, it features elaborate stone and terra cotta trim and four large and imposing fluted composite columns at its main entrance.

- Allentown National Bank (1905)

Also known as: Meridian Bank
Added 2005 - NRHP: #05001490
13–17 N. 7th Street
Map location: 40°36′10″N 075°28′18″W
Historic bank building built in 1905, it is a large eight-story, steel frame and masonry-clad building in the Beaux-Arts style. The bank was first chartered in 1855 by the Commonwealth as the Allentown Bank with a capitalization of $100,000. It was the first bank in Allentown, and was renamed Allentown National Bank in 1866 when it received its federal charter. The building was vacated in the 1990s; however, in the early 2000s, it was re-developed into apartments for independent living senior citizens.

- Americus Hotel (1926)

Added 1984 - NRHP: #84003454
541 W. Hamilton Street
Map location: 40°36′11″N 075°28′11″W
Classic 1920s Jazz Age hotel built by a group of Allentown businessmen who wanted a first-class hotel in the central business district. It was not to be a palatial private "pleasure dome" like those of the 19th-century robber barons. Rather, it would be a hotel, a public facility that provided the best that world-class service and up-to-date technology could offer. A world class buffet was featured in its restaurant which was considered a must do for Mother's Day and other special occasions.

- Bogert Covered Bridge (1841)

Added 1980 - NRHP: #80003552
South of Allentown on LR 39016, Little Lehigh Park, Allentown
Map location: 40°34′08″N 075°29′54″W
Historic wooden covered bridge located at Allentown, Lehigh County, Pennsylvania. It is a 145-foot-long (44 m), Burr Truss bridge, constructed in 1841. It has vertical plank siding and a gable roof. It was restored by the Allentown Parks Department.

- Dime Savings and Trust Company (1925)

Also known as First Valley Bank
Added 1985 - NRHP: #85000036
12 N. 7th Street
Map location: 40°36′09″N 075°28′19″W
Historic bank building built in 1925, and is a T-shaped, five-story red brick building. The base is sheathed in limestone, and the distinctive brick and limestone attic level is reflective of the Art Deco style. The Dime Bank failed in 1932 and over the years the building has been largely vacant. The building was re-constructed and restored as part of the PPL Center project, and was incorporated into the project. The Dime Bank Building is used as the lobby for the 200-room Marriott Renaissance Hotel that is attached to the arena. Its two-story foyer, once the main banking area, houses the front desk and upper floors and includes offices and meeting space for the arena operators.

- Dorneyville Crossroad Settlement (1756)

Also known as King George Inn, John Dorney House, William Dorney House
Added 1977 - NRHP: #77001172
3141 Hamilton Boulevard
Map location: 40°34′44″N 075°31′16″W
Built in 1756 around the time of the French and Indian War. It was originally opened as Dorney's Tavern and was one of four structures the Dorney family built at the crossroads of the Buffalo Trail: Cedar Crest Boulevard and south to Kings Highway, and the Lancaster, Reading, and Allentown roads, Hamilton Boulevard/U.S. Route 222. The inn offered a place to sleep for those traveling to Easton, Reading, Philadelphia, and the Allegheny Mountains. It also served as the community center, used as a town hall, meeting house, courthouse, early church, and a news center.

During the Revolutionary War, Washington's Continental Army troops camped in the fields behind the building, while the officers probably stayed in the inn. The area where the soldiers performed their drills was located in a field behind the building. Peter Dorney owned the original hotel, which remained in the family until 1871. Over the last century, it was owned by Stanley E. Downing who ran it as the Dorneyville Hotel from 1930 until his death in 1962. Downing's wife, Grace, took over and ran it as the White Horse Inn. At the time, a large white wooden horse stood in a corral out front. In November 1970, Downing sold the business to Cliff McDermott, who renamed it the King George Inn, restored it closely to its original appearance, and had it placed on the National Register of Historic Places. In August 2012, the King George Inn was closed, and its future is undetermined.

- Gauff-Roth House (1880)

Added 1985 - NRHP: #85001966
427-443 Auburn Street
Map location: 40°35′46″N 075°27′49″W
Historical Victorian architecture home featuring a wraparound porch, third-floor balcony, a polygonal turret, and a hipped roof with multiple gables and dormers. The house was built in 1880 for Mary Craig and Elizabeth Craig Gauff with money inherited from their grandfather. Mary met William Gangewere while the house was being constructed and married him. She lived only a short time in the home or not at all. The home was occupied by the Gauff family in 1880, the Zieglers in 1912 and the Roths in 1930. It was added to the National Register of Historic Places in 1985. The home was completely renovated in the mid-1990s.

- Haines Mill (1760)

Also known as Haines Mill Museum
Added 1985 - NRHP: #85001966
432 W. Walnut Street
Map location: 40°35′02″N 075°31′57″W
Haines Mill is a grist mill that dates back to colonial times. It is an example of the Lehigh Valley’s agricultural heritage, The mill uses water power to grind crop grains into flour. The original mill was built around 1760. The mill was reconstructed in 1909 after a fire gutted the interior of the building and operated until 1956. Today, the mill is owned by Lehigh County and operated by the Lehigh County Historical Society.

- High German Evangelical Reformed Church (1762)

Also known as Zion Reformed, Zion United Church of Christ
Added 1983 - NRHP: #83002259
Liberty Bell Museum
620 W. Hamilton Street
Map location: 40°36′08″N 075°28′13″W
Oldest church in Allentown. In 1777, while the British occupied Philadelphia, this Allentown church was used to hide the Liberty Bell as well as the chimes from Philadelphia's Christ Church. This clandestine act of patriotism prevented the British from melting down these treasures for use as ammunition. In 1838, the church was enlarged and may have incorporated the 1762 structure into the building, inside the walls of the current boiler room. The building was doubled in size in from 1886 to 1888 in the Gothic Revival style, in accordance with the designs of architect Lewis Jacoby. In 2023, the museum was closed, and its artifacts transferred to the Lehigh County Historical Society.

- Hotel Sterling (1890)

Added 1984 - NRHP: #84003469
343–345 W. Hamilton Street
Map location: 40°36′17″N 075°27′46″W
Victorian era hotel built in the Romanesque Revival style with Queen Anne and Eastlake influences. It is three bays wide, with a gabled parapet at the middle bay. It was constructed beginning in 1889 and completed in 1890. The building is in Allentown's first industrial area and when built was near two railroad depots thus served travelers and industrial workers. When nominated in 1980, the hotel had 33 sleeping rooms. Today, the hotel is used as a nightclub. The bar spans two levels, one of which includes a large dance floor, and spills onto a covered deck off of the second floor.

- Lehigh Canal: Allentown to Hopeville section (1829)

Added 1979 - NRHP: #79002307
East banks of the Lehigh River
Map location: 40°36′27″N 075°27′12″W
The Lehigh Canal changed the character of Allentown and the Lehigh Valley from an agricultural area to an industrial one in 1829. The Canal was first used to bring anthracite coal down from Mach Chunk (now Jim Thorpe) to Easton, where it went south to Philadelphia on the Delaware River. The railroads reached Allentown in the 1850s, and became direct competitors with the canal. By the American Civil War, the economic use of Lehigh Canal ended.

- Lehigh County Prison (1869)

Added 1998 - NRHP: #81000549
N. 4th and W. Linden Streets
Map location: 40°36′17″N 075°28′00″W
Construction of the prison in 1867 The Civil War era facility held 40 cells, each designed to hold one man. The fortress itself featured walls 45 feet high. Spartan-like cells contained a bed, a sink, a table and a stool. It was on the cutting edge of 19th Century criminal justice practices. The prison was the site of a number of executions, the first in 1894 when Harry Johnson was hanged for the murder of his 4-year-old daughter. The last execution took place in 1910 when George Schaffer was hanged for the axe murder of a Philadelphia traveling salesman

Time and spiraling crime rates pressed the county into building additions to the original structure. one in 1908 and another in 1981. Those efforts, however, proved ineffective in the long run and by 1986, the prison was well worn from use and over-crowdedness. Inmates filed a lawsuit in Federal Court claiming conditions in the old prison violated their Constitutional rights. The legal battle that ensued lasted nearly four years before the County and inmates entered into a consent decree. That settlement mandated construction of a new prison which finally opened its doors for business in May 1992.

- Neuweiler Brewery (1911)

Added 1980 - NRHP: #80003554
401 N. Front Street
Map location: 40°36′40″N 075°27′29″W
Historic brewery complex located at Allentown, Lehigh County, Pennsylvania. The complex was built between 1911 and 1913, and consists of the office building, brew house, stock house, pump house, wash house, chemistry lab building, boiler room, bottling house, garage, fermenting cellar, and smokestack with the name "Neuweiler" on it. The office building is a two-story, brick and granite building. The remaining buildings in the complex are built of brick. The brew house stands six-stories, and has a copper hipped roof with cupola. The stock house is a long, narrow four-story building. The brewery closed in 1968, and the property is currently in a derelict condition. Many proposals have been made to redevelop the property, the last in 2013 now under review by the Allentown Planning Commission.

- Nonnemaker House (c. 1790)

Also known as Thomas Mewhorter House
Added 1973 - NRHP: #73002281
301 S. Lehigh Street
Map location: 40°35′56″N 075°28′05″W
Built by Thomas Mewhorter. He was a prominent citizen of the city in the era after the American Revolution. Owned a Tannery and a Bark Mill near the home, died in 1807. Purchased by John Nonnemacher, a brick maker. During the construction of the first Lehigh County Courthouse, he made the mortar for the workmen in the construction of the building. Also was a soldier in the War of 1812. He later operated a number of brickyards in the area. Home remained in the Nonnemaker family for several generations. The area around the home was torn down in the early 1970s, however, the home remained standing for several years afterward, later being torn down in the 1980s. The land is now part of area for Building 21 High School.

- Old Lehigh County Courthouse (1819)

Added 1981 - NRHP: #81000550
503 W. Hamilton Street
Map location: 40°36′12″N 075°28′06″W
Historic county courthouse. The original section was built between 1814 and 1819, and was a 2 1/2-story, stone building with a hipped roof. It was remodeled and enlarged in 1864 in the Italianate style. An addition on the west was added in 1880–1881, and the addition to the north was built in 1914–1916, in the Beaux-Arts style.

- Trout Hall (1768)

Added 1973 - NRHP: #78002425
414 W. Walnut Street
Map location: 40°36′06″N 075°27′54″W
It is the oldest home in Allentown, built between 1768 and 1770, and is a 2 1/2-story, stone dwelling in the Georgian architecture style. It was built as a summer home by James Allen, the third son of William Allen, founder of Allentown. Today, it houses the library and museum of the Lehigh County Historical Society.

- Zollinger-Harned Company Building (1926)

Added 1978 - NRHP: #79002288
605-613 W. Hamilton Street
Map location: 40°36′10″N 075°28′14″W
Classic 20th-Century Department Store, built in 1925–1926, and is a three-story, seven-bay-wide building with Classical Revival style influences. It features architectural terra cotta panels and richly detailed bronze display window surrounds. Zollinger-Harned Department Store went bankrupt in 1978, property sold and redeveloped as Sovereign Building, used for class-A office space.

=== Notable landmarks ===
- Adams Island (1828)

An island on the Lehigh River, accessed via Adams Island Road from N. Bradford Street
Map location: 40°36′50″N 075°27′14″W
An artificial island in the Lehigh River, created when the Lehigh Canal was built in 1828. The canal cut through a piece of land that jutted out from the east bank of the river. Initially called "Kletor's Island", the island became a resort location during the summers. The island was later known as "Haymaker’s Island," today it is known as Adams Island and it has many small homes with boat docks along the riverbank. Adams Island is owned by the Allentown Swimming and Boating Club and is private property. There is no public access to the island and only club members are permitted access.

- Allen Infantry (First Defenders) Memorial (1925)

Located at West Park in Allentown
Map location: 40°35′58″N 075°29′23″W
An American Civil War memorial honoring the Allen Infantry, a company from Allentown also known as "First Defenders". The statue depicts Ignatz Gresser, who was later awarded the Congressional Medal of Honor for heroism in the Battle of Antietam; he is the only Allentownian ever to have been honored thus.
In April 1861, in response to the call from President Abraham Lincoln, Allentown sent a company of Pennsylvania militia to defend the national capital in Washington, D.C. The Allen Infantry was one of the first to reach Washington, D.C.. By their presence, they deterred the Confederate Army from capturing Washington, D.C. The memorial was designed by Samuel Addison Weishampel.

- Allentown Art Museum (1934)

31 N. 5th Street
Map location: 40°36′15″N 075°28′05″W
Major regional art museum founded in 1934 by a group organized by noted Pennsylvania impressionist painter, Walter Emerson Baum. Currently has a collection of over 13,000 works. In addition, its library and archives of more than 16,000 titles and 40 current periodicals make it an important cultural resource.

- Allentown Arts Park

24-32 N. 5th St
Map location: 40°36′14″N 075°28′07″W
Starting point of the Allentown Arts Walk across from the Allentown Art Museum, now home to a duo of monumental bronze statues by the academic painter and sculptor Jean-Léon Gérôme, "Metallurgical Worker" and "Metallurgical Science" (1903) celebrating steel workers and the steel era.

- Allentown City Hall (1962)

435 W. Hamilton Street
Map location: 40°36′14″N 075°28′00″W
Location of Allentown government offices, Mayor's office, City Council, and City Departments.

- Allentown Cemetery Park (1765)

Old Allentown Cemetery (1846)
North side of W. Linden Street between Fountain and N. 10th Streets
Map location: 40°36′10″N 075°28′40″W
The Allentown Cemetery Park was established by city founder William Allen as the graveyard for his community. The first person recorded as being buried in the cemetery was Mary Huber in 1765. The older stones have epitaphs written in ornate German Gothic script. There are many graves here of Allentown men who fought in the American Revolution. A large memorial at the corner of 10th and Linden lists them as well as the veterans of the War of 1812. Among the most famous interred here is Peter Rhoads Sr., a local storekeeper and member of the Revolutionary-era Committee for Public Safety.
The adjacent Old Allentown Cemetery is the city's second-oldest cemetery, located next to Allentown Cemetery Park. Burial site of Tilghman Good (1830–87), a two-term mayor of Allentown and commander of the 47th Pennsylvania Infantry Regiment, a division of the Union Army during the American Civil War.

- Allentown Fairgrounds (1889)

Northwest corner of 17th and Chew Streets
Map location: 40°36′03″N 075°29′50″W
Home of the Great Allentown Fair, an annual fair and agricultural show operated by the Lehigh County Agricultural Society. It is one of the oldest fairs in the United States, and one of the largest in the Commonwealth of Pennsylvania. Also home of the Allentown Farmers Market.

- Allentown Post Office (1934)

442 W. Hamilton Street
Map location: 40°36′11″N 075°28′02″W
Built in 1933-1934, the Art Deco design adds a touch of distinction to a rather simple building. On the interior is a series of murals produced in 1937-1938 by New York artist Gifford Beal (1879-1956). Each deals with a theme from Allentown history.

- Allentown Public Library (1912)

1210 W. Hamilton Street
Map location: 40°35′56″N 075°28′55″W
Municipal library open to the general public. Opened on November 25, 1912 at 914 Hamilton Street; origins date to 1810 at corner of 6th and Hamilton Streets which burned in 1893. The general alarm fire which destroyed the Asbury Methodist Episcopal Church on October 24, 1972 (Built 1921) led to the purchase of the land by the city. The Allentown School District purchased the former church site at Jefferson and Hamilton streets on behalf of the Allentown Library board in the spring of 1974. The library constructed a modern facility utilizing the entire block, and the current library opened in 1976. It has a large research room, computer access, and newspaper microfilm library

- Allentown Rose Garden (1929)

2750 Parkway Boulevard
Map location: 40°35′32″N 075°30′54″W
A Rose Garden, with many beautiful flowers and ponds filled with water lilies, are known for their All-America Rose Selections. The garden is meticulously tended, laid out in symmetry and dotted with vined trellises, statuary and a white gazebo. The garden overlooks a pair of lily-padded ponds, shaded by willow trees and bound by the wandering Cedar Creek. It is a location for many weddings in the late spring and summer.

- Alliance Hall (1928)

245 N. 6th Street
Map location: 40°36′25″N 075°28′17″W
Erected 1926-1928 as Allentown's first Jewish Community Center. Built on the site of a 19th-century mansion owned by the Siebert family, merchants who made a small fortune manufacturing rugs and dry goods, then shipping them to California during the 1848 California Gold Rush. The 19th-century mansion was sold and became the temporary headquarters of the Jewish Community Center in 1920, however, plans were made for a bigger facility with a gym and swimming pool. The current structure was designed by David Levy, the city's first Jewish architect, who also designed the Colonial Theater and the redone facade of the Lyric Theater, now Symphony Hall. Alliance hall opened in May 1928, became major focal point of Allentown's Jewish Community until 1958 when the new (and current) Jewish Community Center was opened at N. 22nd and W. Tilghman Streets. Sold to Catholic Diocese of Allentown, became Carroll Annex, used as classroom space for Central Catholic High School. It sold in 1969 to members of the African American community as a community center; It was sold again in 1990 to the Allentown Health Bureau. The building's current use is as a multipurpose facility for AHB with its basement acting as a wintertime homeless shelter managed by the Lehigh Conference of Churches.

- America on Wheels (2008)

5 N. Front Street
Map location: 40°36′24″N 075°27′24″W
An over-the-road transportation museum. The 43,000-square-foot (4,000 m2) museum offers over 23,000 square feet (2,100 m2) of exhibit space divided into three main galleries and several smaller exhibits. The museum's collection features over 75 bicycles, motorcycles, automobiles, and trucks in exhibits telling the story of people and products on the move from the days of the carriage to the vehicles of tomorrow.

- Baum School of Art (1926)

510 W. Linden Street
Map location: 40°36′15″N 075°28′08″W
A non-profit community art school established in the summer of 1926 when the impressionist painter Walter Emerson Baum was recruited by Blanche Lucas to provide art instruction to art teachers of the Allentown School District. Feedback was so positive that Baum was asked to return again and again. The classes became known as "The Baum School." Since October 4, 2002 it has been home to a 12-foot (3.6 m) high replica of Leonardo's horse which stands in the Charles C. Dent Memorial Garden at the School.

- Philip and Muriel Berman Sculpture Park (1980)

1243 South Cedar Crest Boulevard at Lehigh Valley Hospital–Cedar Crest
Map location: 40°33′53″N 075°31′09″W
Features 35 permanent works on 118-acres of scenic land.

- Earl F. Hunsicker Bicentennial Park (1976)

510 W. Linden Street
Map location: 40°35′15″N 075°28′32″W
Originally Bicentennial Park, built as a baseball field for amateur teams in the Allentown area and home of the Allentown Patriots softball team. Renamed 5 June 1988. Hosted the Allentown Ambassadors independent semi-professional baseball team, 1997–2003. Was also the home of the Philadelphia Force women's professional softball team (2006-2010).

- Breinig & Bachman Building (1894)

544-546 W. Hamilton Street
Map location: 40°36′09″N 075°28′10″W
Breinig and Bachman was a men's clothing store that occupied the ground floor of the building for many years. It features tetra-cotta animal heads along the side of its fourth floor. The reason for the animal heads around the building is unknown, although it is speculated they were placed there to please one of the building's original long-time tenants, the wholesale grain and animal feed dealer George W. Eckert who owned a large granary.
Built in 1894, this yellow bricked structure replaced a building of a similar name built three years before. That building was the home of the Odd Fellows fraternal order and first library in Allentown. It was destroyed along with the rest of the southeast side of the street in a fire on the night of Friday, October 13, 1893.
Today, the first floor of the building is home of the Morgan Stanley Dean Witter & Co. financial services corporation. Its upper floors are vacant.

- Buchman House (1877)

117 N. 11th Street
Map location: 40°36′15″N 075°28′50″W
Victorian-era row house was the home of Frank Buchman (1878–1961), the founder of the Moral Rearmament Movement. He maintained the Allentown home until his death in West Germany. Today it is administered as a house museum by the Lehigh County Historical Society.

- Butz-Groff House (1872)

111 N. 4th Street
Map location: 40°36′21″N 075°27′57″W
Built by attorney Samuel A. Butz, this dark stone Victorian home was once the center of Allentown's most fashionable residential district. Butz, a long time member of the board of Allentown College of Women, now Cedar Crest College, practiced law up to the day of his death in 1930. From 1930 to 1975, it was the home of Butz's grandson, Joseph C. Groff and his family. It was purchased by Allentown entrepreneur Ray Holland and renovated to house his antique car memorabilia collection. Not open to the public.

- Cathedral Church of Saint Catharine of Siena (1954)

1825 W. Turner Street
Map location: 40°35′55″N 075°29′47″W
Home of the Diocese of Allentown. Constructed as a parish church, the building became a cathedral in 1961 with the diocese's founding. It was designed in a colonial style. The exterior is faced with a variegated salmon brick trimmed with Salem limestone. At the crossing formed by the transept, there is a tall spire topped with a stainless steel cross. The windows are colonial glazed antique glass. The cathedral also features two large murals by Dana van Horn depicting the life of St. Catherine of Sienna.

- Cedar Crest College (1867)

100 College Drive
Map location: 40°35′13″N 075°31′12″W
Private liberal arts women's college. During the 2006-2007 academic year, the college had 1,000 full-time and 800 part-time undergraduates and 85 graduate students. It also admits male students for evening classes. The college is historically tied to the United Church of Christ, though it remains academically independent.

- Center Square (1762)

Intersection of 7th and W. Hamilton Streets
Map location: 40°36′08″N 075°28′18″W
Focal point of the community as it was conceived by William Allen in 1762. Central point in Allentown's Central Business District. Two National Register of Historic Places buildings are on the north side of the square. Location of the Soldier's and Sailors monument, built in 1899 in honor of American Civil War veterans from the 47th Pennsylvania Infantry Regiment.

- Civic Theatre of Allentown (1928)

527 N. 19th Street
Map location: 40°36′11″N 075°29′59″W
The oldest movie theater in Allentown, opened as a silent film theater on September 17, 1928. Today, also home of the Civic Theatre of Allentown, a historic community center that hosts theater, arts education, and film and is a major part of the 19th Street Theater District, a mixed use neighborhood home to nearly 140 businesses.

- Coca-Cola Park (2008)

1050 Iron Pigs Way
Map location: 40°37′33″N 075°27′08″W
An 8,200-seat baseball park. It is the home field for the Lehigh Valley IronPigs, the Triple-A level minor league baseball affiliate of the Philadelphia Phillies. Coca-Cola Park accommodates 10,100 fans, including auxiliary areas (Capital Blue Cross Lawn, Dugout Suites, and Red Robin Tiki Terrace), and cost $50.25 million to build.

- Da Vinci Science Center (1992)

3145 Hamilton Boulevard Bypass
Map location: 40°35′02″N 075°31′19″W
Science museum and nonprofit organization that has been a leader in bringing science to life and lives to science since 1992. Its slogan is Open for ExSCIting Possibilities. The center displays a three-foot (1 m) replica of Leonardo's horse in its main lobby, which was dedicated when the science center opened its current location on October 30, 2005.

- Dorney Park & Wildwater Kingdom (1884)

3830 Dorney Park Road
Map location: 40°34′47″N 075°31′53″W
Large amusement and water park. The park features eight roller coasters, other adult and children's rides, and a waterpark, Wildwater Kingdom. It features some of the world's most prominent roller coasters, including Steel Force, the ninth longest steel roller coaster in the world and the longest on the U.S. East Coast.

- Farr Building (1906)

739 W. Hamilton Street
Map location: 40°36′07″N 075°28′24″W
Large, early 20th-century office building and retail store in the Central Business District on Hamilton Street. Farr company manufactured, distributed and sold high-quality men's and women's shoes from 1862 to 1986. Redeveloped in the 2000s, now used for both retail and residential apartments. A historical plaque on the side of the building along N. 8th Street states that "On this site was located one of four hospitals for soldiers of the Continental Army." The plaque was placed on the building in 1925 by the "Citizens of Allentown and Liberty Bell Chapter, Daughters of the American Revolution".

- Fairview Cemetery (1870)

S. Lehigh and S. 8th Streets
Map location: 40°35′32″N 075°28′19″W
Historic cemetery in South Allentown. The cemetery itself was formally laid-out in 1870, when the renowned architectural firm Lathan of Buffalo was hired to create the premiere resting place in the Lehigh Valley. The elits of Allentown would be buried there, among them Harry Clay Trexler, the Lehs, and the Mack family of Mack Trucks Many historic graves from the late 19th century until the present day. In 1996 the Fairview Cemetery Association, which maintained the grounds, filed for bankruptcy. After which, volunteers have tried to maintain the property.

- Hamilton Street Bridge (1959)

Hamilton and Front Streets
Map location: 40°36′22″N 075°27′15″W
The first bridge across the Lehigh River, connecting present-day Allentown and the land to the east of the Lehigh River dates to 1814. However, soon after the public road was laid out between Easton and Reading in 1754, a ferry was established across the Lehigh River near the present-day Hamilton Street Dam. Many efforts were made to erect a bridge until 1814 when a chain bridge was finally erected. It was replaced in 1841 when a flood swept the first bridge away, replaced by a covered wooden toll bridge. That structure was washed away by the flood of January 1862 and a temporary bridge was erected which served until 1867, when a new iron bridge was built. It was washed away in the flood of February 1902 and replaced by a steel bridge in 1907. The current bridge replaced the 1907 bridge that was declared structurally unsafe for modern-day traffic. Work was begun on a new concrete structure costing $1,600,000 on June 26, 1958 and completed December 14, 1959 It was extensively refurbished in the 1980s.

- Hotel Penn (1866)

101 N. 7th Street
Map location: 40°36′13″N 075°28′19″W
The Hotel Penn (also known as the 1895 Hotel) traces its heritage back to the early days of Allentown. The first hotel at this location opened around 1810 in a house originally owned by the daughter-in-law of William Allen, the city's founder. The hotel was upgraded and changed ownership. In the late 1800s, Hotel Penn was popular with farmers, and during World War I, it was popular with industrial workers. In the 1980s, the City of Allentown renovated the building. Senior citizens occupy what remains of the Penn Hotel.

- Hopps at The Paddock (1948)

1945 W. Columbia Street
Map location: 40°37′02″N 075°30′30″W
Local restaurant, notable for being the first and oldest pizza restaurant in the area. First located at 2231 Walbert Avenue, moved to current location in 1957, although the restaurant possibly dates back to the 1930s. The passing of the original owner, Jack Kloiber and later his son Gregory in 2010, the restaurant was put up for sale. In 2011, the Hoppy family purchased the property and, with the sale, the restaurant was subsequently renamed.

- J. Birney Crum Stadium (1948)

2001-2025 W. Linden Street
Map location: 40°35′45″N 075°30′05″W
A multi-purpose 15,000-capacity stadium, J. Birney Crum Stadium is the largest high school football stadium in the Mid-Atlantic United States as of 2024. It is used by Allentown's three large high schools and was used by the Pennsylvania Stoners of the NPSL (men) and the Northampton Laurels of the WPSL (women) soccer teams. Also known as Allentown School District Stadium. In addition, the stadium also hosts the annual Drum Corps International Eastern Championships, with drum and bugle corps from all over the country, and a large July Fourth fireworks display that typically draws tens of thousands of spectators.

- Jewish Community Center (1958)

N. 22nd and W. Tilghman Streets
Map location: 40°36′13″N 075°30′31″W
Major focal point of Allentown's Jewish Community. Construction began in September 1955, opened 13 April 1958. Provides athletic facilities, day care, social events and other activities. About 1,000 people a week using the facility for one activity or another. Significant percentage of its membership at this point is non-Jewish.

- John T. Gross Towers (1967)

1339 W. Allen Street
Map location: 40°36′26″N 075°29′22″W
Public housing development for senior citizens. Named for a past mayor of Allentown who died in office in 1964, Gross Towers offers 147 one and two bedroom apartments along with support services. Owned by Allentown Housing Authority. Badly damaged in 1994 gas explosion, fully renovated afterwards.

- Kline's Bridge (1902)

Lehigh Parkway on Park Drive
Map location: 40°34′45″N 075°29′39″W
Steel truss bridge over Little Lehigh Creek, rebuilt 1963. Closed in 2000 to traffic, rebuilt as a weathered steel truss and wood deck and re-opened in 2008 for pedestrian and bicycle traffic only.

- Lehigh County Court House (1962)

455 W. Hamilton Street
Map location: 40°36′13″N 075°28′03″W
Seat of Lehigh County's government, including various courts and other county office functions

- Lehigh County Historical Society (1904)

Lehigh County Heritage Center (2010)
432 W. Walnut Street
Map location: 40°36′07″N 075°27′57″W
Nonprofit organization dedicated to collecting, preserving, and exhibiting the history of Lehigh County, Pennsylvania and the Lehigh Valley. The Lehigh County Historical Society's library, the Scott Andrew Trexerl II Research Library and Archive, houses 70,000 vintage photographs and nearly three million historical documents.

- Lehigh Parkway (1931)

Map location: 40°34′56″N 075°29′00″W
Large public park along the Little Lehigh River. It is the most prominent park of the city and follows the Little Lehigh River for three miles from Center City Allentown to Cedar Crest Boulevard. The park features many scenic exercising trails in addition to bridle paths, a shooting range, and many fishing locations.

- Lehigh Parkway Fish Hatchery (1883)

2901 Fish Hatchery Road
Map location: 40°33′52″N 075°30′46″W
The oldest continuously operating trout nursery in the nation. There are several pools with different sized trout with one long one that stretches alongside the Little Lehigh River. Food for the trout can be purchased in the small shop on the far end of the hatchery. The trout know when humans are nearby and gather, waiting to be fed. Feeding the trout can cause the fish to frenzy and jump. Picnic tables and benches are available.

- Lehigh Portland Cement Company (Portland Place) (1902)

714–720 W. Hamilton Street
Map location: 40°36′06″N 075°28′20″W
Headquarters of company. Known as the Young Building after one of the company's founders, Edward M. Young. It was extensively remodeled in the late Art-Modern style in 1939–1940. Over the front door is a glass relief sculpture designed by the Italian American artist Oronzio Maldarelli (1892–1964). At that time it was the largest glass mural panel in the world. Cast at the Pittsburgh Corning Glass Block Company, its three stylized allegorical figures represent the strength, durability, and permanence of cement.

- Lehigh Valley Trust Company (1911)

634-636 W. Hamilton Street
Map location: 40°36′07″N 075°28′15″W
Ornate columns in the front with Beaux Arts festoons of stone garlands. Early 20th century bank, closed in the 1990s. Currently vacant, planned for re-use.

- Livingston Apartments (1928)

1411 W. Hamilton Street
Map location: 40°35′54″N 075°29′11″W
Jazz age apartment building, built in 1928. The Livingston is Beaux Arts architecture of the pre-depression era style. The local newspapers featured large articles hailing the Livingston’s opening. Called "the largest apartment structure in Eastern Pennsylvania outside of Philadelphia," it had been built at a cost of $475,000. the exquisite marble work, the handsome wrought iron fittings, the lighting effects, the stained glass windows hung with charming draperies made it one of the most sought-after addresses. As the years passed the Livingston lost its status. The wealthy wanted homes in the suburbs not apartments in downtown Allentown. Completely renovated in the 2010s, currently in use as in-town condominiums.

- Linden Street Bridge (1884)

W. Linden Street between N. 4th and Race Streets
Map location: 40°36′20″N 075°27′53″W
Stone arch bridge over Jordan Creek. Rebuilt in the early 1950s, reduced to one lane in May 2005.

- Mack Trucks Historical Museum (2010)

2402 Lehigh Parkway South
Map location: 40°34′18″N 075°29′39″W
Repository of historical documents and artifacts from Mack Trucks' long and storied history as the leading American truck manufacturer. Many antique vehicles on display, along with a large collection of more than 80,000 photos, along with records for nearly every chassis it manufactured since 1905, all of which are filed there. Recently expanded (2013) to include the Mack Shop, selling many souvenirs from the company.

- Martin Art Gallery (2010)

2400 W. Chew Street
Map location: 40°35′46″N 075°30′34″W
Art museum located on the Muhlenberg College Campus.

- Merchants Square Model Train Exhibit (2013)

Merchants Square Mall, 1901 S. 12th Street
Map location: 40°34′39″N 075°28′27″W
Model Train exhibit which contains more than 1,000 structures, some handmade from scratch, and more than 40 model trains running continuously on 18,000 feet of track.

- Miller Symphony Hall (1896)

23 N. 6th Street
Map location: 40°36′13″N 075°28′11″W
Premier performing arts facility in Allentown, home of the Allentown Symphony Orchestra, as well as Pennsylvania Sinfonia, Community Concerts of Allentown, Allentown Band and Community Music School of the Lehigh Valley. Built around 1896 as the Central Market Hall, the structure was converted to a theater in 1899 by the architectural firm of J.B. McElfatrick and renamed the Lyric Theater. Perhaps one of only a dozen of the famous McElfatrick designs still standing, for many years it was one of the leading burlesque halls in the eastern United States. Fully renovated with nearly $10 million in improvements, the project concluded during the 2005-06 season with a complete upgrade of the Symphony Hall stage and the construction of a new acoustical shell.

- Muhlenberg College (1848)

2400 W. Chew Street
Map location: 40°35′51″N 075°30′36″W
Private liberal arts college founded in 1848, Muhlenberg is affiliated with the Evangelical Lutheran Church in America and is named for Henry Melchior Muhlenberg, the patriarch of the Lutheran Church in America.

- Museum of Indian Culture (1980)

2825 Fish Hatchery Road
Map location: 40°33′49″N 075°30′45″W
Non-profit organization and educational center dedicated to presenting, preserving, and perpetuating the history of the Lenape and other Northeastern Woodland Indian cultures.

- Nostos Greek Restaurant (1948–2005, 2011–2013, 2014–present)

701 N. 19th Street
Map location: 40°36′19″N 075°30′03″W
Originally Hooks Diner, built in 1947 on W. Tilghman Street from Paramount pre-manufactured aluminum diner based on World War II lunch wagons. Owned by Al Hook it was originally a classic American Diner in the Cubist style wide with a lunch counter and booths along the front windows, glass brick curved corners and sheathed in aluminum or stainless steel. It was designed to serve lunches and dinners during the diner's golden age. After World War II, Tilghman Street expanded into major thoroughfare, first known as the Penn Highway (US 22), and Hooks was one of many similar Diners along the highway going through Allentown. When U.S. Route 22 was rebuilt north of Allentown into locally known "Lehigh Valley Thruway" in 1955, the diner remained popular with the local residents. The Diner was sold to Russel Saylor in 1966 and the building was expanded greatly into a brick and steel structure, renamed Saylor's Restaurant. It offered Pennsylvania Dutch cuisine and became local landmark restaurant. Originally the aluminum diner was visible along Tilghman Street, later bricked over and incorporated into its permanent structure as the front dining area, the diner booths along the front window were retained while the lunch counter was taken out for additional patron table space. Michael Saylor took over operations in 1992. It closed in 2005 and re-opened as "West Side Diner" in 2011. In early 2013, it was sold again to Adam Vlassopoulous and Anthony Athanasiou who renamed it the Colonial Diner & Family Restaurant. After being closed for a kitchen fire that burned through the roof, it was repaired and re-opened in the spring of 2014. In 2016, the property was again sold to Demetrios "Jimmy" Tsatsanis. It was closed and remodeled with new flooring, large wall art depicting Greek scenes and more. The dining counter also was removed. It was renamed Nostos Greek Restaurant and opened in September.

- Overhill Road Bridge (1931)

Lehigh Parkway on Overhill Road
Map location: 40°35′17″N 075°29′16″W
Scenic concrete arch bridge over Little Lehigh Creek. It was rebuilt 1984.

- Parkettes National Gymnastics Training Center (1960)

410 Martin Luther King Boulevard
Map location: 40°36′02″N 075°27′48″W
Nationally famous gymnasium and school for gymnastics talent, trains future Olympians. Over 100 members have made the U.S. national gymnastics team, Pan-American team, world championship teams, and several U.S. Olympic teams. Serves the area with a wide range of classes for all ages and skill levels.

- PPL Building (1928)

Northwest Corner of 9th and W. Hamilton Streets
Map location: 40°36′05″N 075°28′34″W
Tallest building in Allentown at 23 stories, headquarters to PPL Corporation. Built between 1926–1928. This classic Art-Deco skyscraper was designed by architect Harvey Wiley Corbett (1873–1954) of the firm of Helme & Corbett. A pioneer in skyscraper design, Corbett was one of several architects who planned Rockefeller Center in the 1930s. His assistant Wallace K. Harrison (1895–1984), who later went on to design the United Nations Building, Lincoln Center, and many other projects for the Rockefeller family, was the on-site architect.

In 2008, PPL created a peregrine falcon nesting platform outside its 23rd floor.

- PPL Center (2014)

Southwest Corner of 7th Street and W. Hamilton Street
Map location: 40°36′09″N 075°28′22″W
Indoor arena/civic center home to the American Hockey League Lehigh Valley Phantoms and Lehigh Valley Steelhawks indoor football team. The 10,000 seat facility (8,000 for hockey) is also used for concerts and other events.

- Pines Dinner Theater (2011)

448 N. 17th Street
Map location: 40°36′10″N 075°29′44″W
Located at northeast corner of Allentown Fairgrounds at a former Beer Garden, Full-course American cuisine restaurant along with live theater plays.

- Queen City Airport (1943)

1730 Vultee Street
Map location: 40°34′13″N 075°29′17″W
Constructed during World War II as Convair Field by the U.S. federal government as an airfield for Consolidated Vultee Aircraft. Original purpose was to provide testing/delivery for Consolidated TBY-2 Sea Wolf Torpedo Plane for the U.S. Navy, being manufactured at Mack Plant 5C. Also included construction of Vultee Street to link the new airfield to the 5C plant, along with large area of housing in Southwest Allentown for industrial workers. Turned over to City in 1947, has served primarily general aviation since. Renamed Queen City Airport in 1961. In the 1960s, industrial park along Vultee Street developed. Today, the airport is owned and operated by the Lehigh-Northampton Airport Authority, which bought it from the city in 2000

- Reading Road Bridge (1824)

South St. Elmo and W. Walnut Streets
Map location: 40°35′37″N 075°29′55″W
Dual stone arch bridge over Cedar Creek connecting Walnut Street and Reading Road. Built in 1828 and restored in 1980

- Ritz Barbecue (1929)

In the Allentown Fairgrounds, 302 N. 17th Street
Map location: 40°36′04″N 075°29′46″W
One of the landmark restaurants of Allentown, the Ritz was opened in 1929 by William R. "Billy" Ritz who initially established a small ice cream stand at the Allentown Fairgrounds. With the success of his fair concession stand, Ritz asked the Lehigh County Agricultural Society who owned the fairground to rent space and establish a permanent all-year restaurant on the fairgrounds. With that permission obtained and a spot leased next to the Grandstand Ticket Office, Ritz set about building a small frame structure. The restaurant specialized in serving barbecue sandwiches and "made on the premises" ice cream. The original frame structure Ritz built eventually was expanded during the 1930s into a two- story brick building which afforded sit-down as well as window service. In June 1998, the Ritz was destroyed by a major fire. However owing largely to the landmark status of the restaurant and the popularity with local residents, the restaurant was completely rebuilt, inside and outside, in the same design as the 1930s structure. The only difference between the Ritz of today and the one before the fire is that the reopened restaurant no longer makes its own ice cream, obtaining it now from several local dairies

- Saint Paul's Lutheran Church (1903)

36 S. 8th Street
Map location: 40°36′02″N 075°28′24″W
The first German Evangelical Lutheran Church in Allentown, congregation dating to 1794. Only organization dating back to the founding of the Allentown with a direct tie to the family of the city founder. The present-day church structure stands on s lot given by Margaret Allen Tilghman, daughter of William Allen, founder of city. Her remains were interred in a crypt under the original church, built on the site in 1794. The current church was built 1903 and her remains were moved to a crypt in the base of the bell tower. From the original congregation, St. John's (1855), St. Michael's (1875) and St. Matthew's (1890) Lutheran Churches were founded.

- Salisbury Church Bridge (1870)

Devonshire and Keystone Roads
Map location: 40°33′21″N 075°30′26″W
Scenic stone arch bridge over Little Lehigh River. Rebuilt in 1963.

- Samuel Adams Brewing Company (1971)

7880 Penn Drive, Breiningsville, 18031
Map location: 40°34′37″N 075°37′46″W
Produces nearly two-thirds of all Samuel Adams beer. Originally opened in 1972 for the F. & M. Schaefer Brewing Company Sold to the Stroh Brewery Company in 1980, and later to the Pabst Brewing Company in 1999 and to Diageo Brewing Company in 2001. Purchased by the Boston Beer Company in June 2008, and operated as the Samuel Adams Pennsylvania Brewery.

- Schreibers Bridge (1828)

Martin Luther King Jr. Drive and Lehigh Parkway East
Map location: 40°35′23″N 075°29′17″W
Historic stone arch bridge over Little Lehigh Creek, rebuilt in 1920 and repaired in 2011 after being struck by a truck, 2013

- Shankweiler's Drive-In Theater (1934)

Shankweiler's Hotels and Restaurants
4540 Shankweiler Road, Orefield (1926–1993)
Map location: 40°38′41″N 075°35′40″W
Intersection PA 100 and PA 1022, Fogelsville (1932–1993)
Map location: 40°35′05″N 075°37′33″W
Family hotels and restaurants, famous for chicken and waffles. Origins date to 1905 when Wilson Shankweiler purchased the Iron Exchange Hotel in Parryville. The Shankweiler hotels had many famous guests. On April 9, 1935, Charles Curtis, U.S. vice president in the Hoover administration stayed there. Numerous other celebrities in the 1940s and 1950s were accommodated.
Orefield location opened in 1926 initially as a hotel and restaurant along original US 309, now PA 309. Drive-in theater opened initially in 1932 directly behind the restaurant showing silent films, added sound in 1934. Today, the Drive-in is still in operation, being the oldest continuing operating drive-in, and the second drive-in established in the United States. Restaurant closed in 1993, now Hunsucker Funeral Home.
Fogelsville location opened on 26 June 1932 as hotel and restaurant along original US 22 (Now PA 1022). Restaurant closed 1993, building now being operated as a bank.

- Spanish–American War/Boxer Rebellion/Philippine–American War statue (1937)

Greenspace located at College Heights Boulevard, N. 28th and W. Tilghman Streets
Map location: 40°35′58″N 075°31′10″W
A statue created by Theo Alice Ruggles Kitson. It commemorates the American soldiers who fought in the Spanish–American War, the Boxer Rebellion, and the Philippine–American War. Leonard Sefing Jr., a Spanish–American War veteran from Allentown, was the model for the statue.

- Tilghman Street Viaduct (1929)

Front and Tilghman Streets
Map location: 40°37′02″N 075°27′25″W
Built in 1928–1929 for US 22 construction, it is the second bridge in Allentown to cross the Lehigh River, connecting the eastern (Union Boulevard) and western (Tilghman Street) parts of the city. Classic open-spandrel concrete arch bridge, almost 1,400 feet long. Opened in September 1929 at a cost of $900,000. Partially rebuilt in 1995, scheduled for closure and two-year $20 million dollar extensive restoration began in 2016 after opening of the American Parkway Bridge, whose traffic was being detoured over. Under consideration for the National Register of Historic Places.

- Traylor Hotel (1917)

1444 W. Hamilton Street
Map location: 40°35′51″N 075°29′14″W
An historic hotel, built by businessman Samuel Traylor Sr. in 1917, with an additional wing added in 1929. Traylor kept his office there and lived there in the later years of his life. In its early to mid-20th-century heyday, the Hotel Traylor was popular with prominent visitors to the city, including ex-president William Howard Taft, conductor and composer John Philip Sousa, baseball great Babe Ruth, and movie star Joan Crawford. The hotel remained in operation until the 1970s, and then it became a rooming house and went into a decline. It was renovated and restored in the early 2000s.

- Union and West End Cemetery (1854)

Between N. 10th and 12th Streets along W. Chew Street
Map location: 40°36′18″N 075°28′57″W
Established in April 1954, purchased for $200 per acre from farmers Jacob Miller and Jacob Hagenbach. The cemetery grounds cover 19.6 acres and is the final resting place for over 22,000 departed souls. There are more than 700 American Civil War veterans buried in the cemetery, a few American Revolutionary War soldiers, and veterans from the War of 1812, Spanish-American War, and World War I interred there. Civil War Medal of Honor recipient, Ignatz Gresser, is buried in the cemetery. It is also the final resting place of Allentown's first mayor, Samuel McHose. From the 1870s to the early 1930s, Allentown's Memorial Day services were held at the site. In 2004, the 150th anniversary of the cemetery was celebrated with a Civil War funeral that incorporated a horse-drawn hearse and Civil War re-enactors.

- Waidlich Building (1926)

Map location: 40°36′10″N 075°28′14″W
627-629 W. Hamilton Street
Opened in 1926 as the Waidlich Building; the first floor of the building was initially home of the American Medicine Company which was part of the Rexall Drug chain from 1932 to 1935, when it became a Sun Ray Drug Store. In 1946, the first floor was sold to Emil E. Otto, who operated a women's ready-to-wear dress store for 50 years until it closed after his death in August 1996. Today, the first floor is known as The Archive, a retail store specializing in footwear, apparel, and accessories for men, Women, and Kids.
Second though eighth floor was opened as men-only hotel called Stag Hotel. Renamed in 1932 as the Hamilton Hotel, being opened to women and also added a restaurant, The Subway Grille, in the basement. Over the years the hotel fell into disrepair and was taken over by the Allentown Housing Authority in the 1980s. Today known as the Hamilton Street Apartments, offering low-income apartments for senior citizens.

- Ward Street (15th Street) Bridge (1957)

Map location: 40°35′28″N 075°28′59″W
Commonly referred to as the 15th Street Bridge, it was the second city bridge across Little Lehigh River, and first bridge to provide direct access from west-side Allentown (15th Street) to southwest Allentown (Wyoming Street). Prior to its construction, the only bridges connecting Center City Allentown and South Allentown were Lehigh Street and the 8th Street bridges, although the single-lane 19th century stone arch Schreibers Bridge (1828, rehabilitated in 1920) provided west end access to southwest Allentown via Lehigh Parkway East. Original bridges were metal honeycomb-grate surfaces, were rebuilt 2010-2013 as pre-stressed concrete spread box beam bridge.

- West End Hotel (1900)

1327–1331 W. Chew Street
Map location: 40°36′10″N 075°29′13″W
Early 1900s hotel/rooming house in Allentown's west end. 48 rooms plus a bar and restaurant the on first floor. Each floor has several shared bathrooms, but kitchens are not available. Average stays exceed 30 days. Early in its history a February 1909 fire destroyed the brick stable, killing an Allentown fireman when the front gable end fell on him while he was helping to remove the contents. Several other men were injured. The blaze resulted from crossed wires in the hay loft. Bar and restaurant now known as Jaber Jaws Bar and Grille, opened in 2008. Hotel accessed by entrance on Chew Street.

- West Park (1908)

1550 W. Turner Street
Map location: 40°35′57″N 075°29′26″W
The land was purchased by the City of Allentown in the 1880s with intentions of creating a reservoir. Unused until March 1906 when the city began to move on the creation of the park by acquiring additional acreage. General Harry Clay Trexler, a local businessman and philanthropist contributed money to build the park. This included a community bandshell, now home of the Allentown Band as well as local theater and religious groups that perform throughout the summer. The West Park was Allentown's first park and today provides a breath of fresh air in the center of the West Park Historic District. The park includes ornamental trees and walks, and a large central fountain.

- William F. Curtis Arboretum (1915)

100 College Drive
Map location: 40°35′13″N 075°31′22″W
Located on the campus of Cedar Crest College. The arboretum contains more than 140 varieties of trees, shrubs, and flowering bushes registered with the American Public Gardens Association.

- YMCA & YWCA of Allentown (1963)

425 S. 15th Street
Map location: 40°35′33″N 075°29′05″W
The Allentown YMCA was first founded in 1856; YWCA in 1886. Organizations consolidated into present building in 1963. Offers wide variety of activities to both youth and adults, men and women. Boys and girls summer camping, after-school and weekend activities.

- Yocco's Hot Dogs (1922)

625 W. Liberty Street
Map location: 40°36′34″N 075°28′27″W
Local restaurant chain known for its hot dogs, founded by Theodore Iacocca, uncle of the late Chrysler CEO Lee Iacocca (1924-2019). Yocco's also serves the standard fare of hamburgers, cheeseburgers, and cheesesteaks.

- Zandy's Steak Shop (1936); Park Theater (1932–1956, 370 seats)

823 St. John Street
Map location: 40°35′29″N 075°28′11″W
Third Generation family restaurant, known locally for its cheese steaks, burgers, and malts.
Edmund Zandarski had moved to Allentown in 1935, and opened a grocery store in 1936 at 738 St. John Street at the southwest corner with Hall street. The store had a deli counter at the shop and started serving steak sandwiches and burgers. The shop switched over to just sandwiches in 1940. With the help of his brother, Zandarski purchased a small, depression-era theater, that closed in 1956 due to poor attendance caused by the television era. It was remodeled, and opened as the new 72-seat Zandy's Steak Shop. Inside the steak shop one can see the remnants of the movie theater clearly.

=== Significant legacy historical sites ===
- A-Treat Bottling Company (1918–2015)

2001 Union Boulevard
Map location: 40°37′33″N 075°25′32″W
Manufactures and bottles the A-Treat brand of carbonated soft drinks. A-Treat beverages have limited distribution throughout Pennsylvania, Maryland, New Jersey, and as far away as Bermuda. The company announced its closure on January 23, 2015. In July, 2015, the assets of the company were purchased and it was announced that production of A-Treat products would be marketed, however, production would be conducted by a third party and the former plant on Union Boulevard would not reopen.

- Acorn Hotel (1910–1995)

513-515 S. Lehigh Street
Map location: 40°35′43″N 075°27′59″W
Early 20th Century hotel built in 1910. Initially catered to farmers, cattle drivers, and auctioneers who came to Allentown to do business at the Allentown Horse Exchange and Bazaar. Behind the Acorn, the Horse Exchange flourished from the late 1800s to 1925. Later served industrial Allentown during the city's manufacturing era of the mid 20th Century. With the end of most of the industry in the Little Lehigh Creek basin, the Acorn's clientele dwindled and was basically derelict by the 1970s. Renovated in the 1980s into a music and dance facility, was unsuccessful and was closed about 1995. Building remains with old sign on front, however its current status is undetermined.

- Adelaide Silk Mill (1881–1964)

333 W. Court Street
Map location: 40°36′19″N 075°27′49″W
Later known as Phoenix Clothing, the Adelaide Silk Mill became one of the largest producers of silk products in the United States. By 1900, there were twenty-three silk establishments in Allentown, making Pennsylvania second only to New Jersey in silk production. The silk industry in Pennsylvania and the United States peaked in the late 1920s. After that, the Great Depression, increasing labor unrest, and competition from rayon began to affect the industry locally and nationally. During World War II the supply of silk disappeared because nearly all of it had been imported from Japan. After the war, new synthetic fibers, especially nylon, replaced silk in many garments and the plant began to produce clothing for major retailers such as Sears, Montgomery Ward, JCPenney, and other brands. Phoenix Clothing remained in production until 1964 until declaring bankruptcy citing foreign competition and lower manufacturing costs overseas. Following the mill's closure, the building has housed a variety of other businesses, none of them fully occupying the building. Current plans for the empty mill is for it to be totally renovated into a apartments.

- Aineyville Viaduct (1893–1953)

Connected St. John Street across Trout Creek in Allentown
Map location: 40°35′35″N 075°27′41″W
"Aineyville" was an area of Southeast Allentown named after William Ainey. Ainey ran the Lehigh Crane Iron Company on the south bank of the Lehigh River. The iron company built a small village to house some of its employees. The village became known as Aineyville. It was separated from South Allentown by the Trout Creek. The viaduct was a bridge built for the Lehigh Valley Transit's Liberty Bell trolley to cross over Trout Creek on the Allentown - Philadelphia interurban route.
The bridge had several incarnations, it was first erected by the Lehigh Valley Traction Company, the predecessor to the Lehigh Valley Transit Company in 1893. Between 1910 and 1913, the structure was replaced with a heavier bridge and was used by both the heavier interurban trollies and the lighter intra-city streetcars. The last interurban Liberty Bell trollies used it in September 1951, and the last streetcar in 1953. Most streetcar tracks were removed or asphalted over shortly after, however, the Aineyville Viaduct survived until April 1954 when it was dismantled.

- Allen Theater (1915–1992)

608-610 N. New Street
Map location: 40°36′33″N 075°28′51″W
Classic local neighborhood theater, 600 seats, catering to second-run films at reduced prices. Operated for over 70 years until closed when final owner died. Razed in 2000 to provide local parking for area.
Other similar neighborhood theaters were:

Astor Theater (1931–49, 700 seats)
1719 Hanover Avenue
Depression-era theater, Located in East Allentown, closed at beginning of television era. Now known as Astor Bingo Hall
Map location: 40°37′14″N 075°25′46″W

Hamilton Theater (1915–1945, 460 seats)
201 W. Hamilton Street
Originally opened in 1915 as a silent film theater in the First Ward. Converted to sound about 1930, the Hamilton Theatre underwent a remodeling in 1939 by architect William H. Lee. It was closed in 1945. Today it is a parking lot.
Map location: 40°36′20″N 075°27′36″W

Madison Theater (1919–1931, 400 seats)
1333–1335 W. Chew Street
Theater opened shortly after World War I, adjacent to West End Hotel and Bar on corner of Madison and Chew Streets. Was a silent film theater, closed with the advent of "talkies" in 1931. Building remains intact with original front facade. Has been divided into two separate businesses within building. Has rear fire exit doors intact in the alley behind Chew.
Map location: 40°36′10″N 075°29′14″W

- Allentown Boiler Works (1883–1931)

300 block of W. Union Street
Map location: 40°36′07″N 075°27′49″W
Established in 1884 by Charles Collum. Large manufacturing facility at S. 3rd and Union Streets. Produced sheet-iron and steel products. Manufactured boilers and other products used across the United States, Canada, Cuba, Europe, and the Philippines. Provided equipment used in the construction of the White House and United States Military Academy. Also operated the first car dealership in Allentown, opening about 1900. Went out of business during the Great Depression; the plant was later torn down.

- Allentown and Reading Traction Company (1902–1929)

Map location: 40°35′38″N 075°29′51″W
The Allentown and Reading Traction Company was an interurban trolley line that ran for 40 miles between Allentown and Reading. Built between 1898 and 1902, it began with a trolley line that was completed in 1902. The line ran 20 miles between Allentown and Kutztown, starting on 7th Street just south of Center Square, then proceeding along Walnut Street and parallel to U.S. Route 222 to Kutztown. The line had stops in Laureldale, Blandon, and Fleetwood before arriving in Kutztown. On the return trip, it stopped at Trexlertown and Dorney Park & Wildwater Kingdom prior to arriving in Allentown. Later that same year, it leased a trolley line from Kutztown to Reading. However, due to a difference in the gauge of the line, passengers needed to change cars in Kutztown. The running time was 2 hours and 40 minutes between Allentown and Reading.

In 1929, the service was ended to Allentown, with a new terminus in East Texas. In 1930, the line only began running between Kutztown and Reading and in 1934 it was discontinued altogether.

- Allentown Female College, now Cedar Crest College (1867–1964)

N. 4th and W. Turner Streets
Map location: 40°36′24″N 075°27′59″W
Women's college, one of the first in the United States. Established in 1867 by Robert Wright Sr. First classes were held at Zions Reformed Church on Hamilton Street; moved to Wright's summer home named "Silver Nook" at 4th and Turner Streets in November 1869. Home was built during the 1850s. In 1893, the school received a new charter and was renamed the Allentown College for Women. School moved in 1915 and changed name to Cedar Crest College. House became the "College Hotel" and remained in operation until 1964. Torn down shortly after its closure and is now a parking lot.

- Allentown Horse Exchange and Bazaar (1870–1925)

S. Church and Maple Streets
Map location: 40°35′44″N 075°27′57″W
Established by J. George Snyder in 1870. Large livery stable, located in the Little Lehigh Creek basin usually having about 60 horses, as well as horses and carriages. Was the largest of several stables in Allentown, extending 120 feet along Maple Street and 90 feet along Church Street. As late as 1917 at the beginning of World War I, there were still well over 1,300 horses in Allentown, and only the main streets had been paved. it closed in 1925 and the site is now occupied by a parking lot.

- Allentown Paint Company (1855–1995)

639 E. Allen Street
Map location: 40°37′01″N 075°26′48″W
The Allentown Paint Company was founded in 1855 by Jacob Breining as the Allentown Manufacturing Company. It produced paints under the name Breining's Ready-Mixed Paints. It also made products that were sold under a variety of names by other paint companies in other regions of the nation. In 1867, T.G. Helfrich became associated with the company and it became Breinig & Helfrich. It was originally located by Helfrich Springs on the Jordan Creek, it moved to this location in 1931 where it continued to manufacture oil-, and water-based paints under the name Allentown Paint. In 1989 the Helfrich family sold the company to the Stulb Paint Company and continued for paint manufacturing until Stulb Paint went out of business in 1995. The building remains today and has been sub-divided into spaces for several companies.

- Allentown Railroad Station (1890–1972)

306 W. Hamilton Street
Map location: 40°36′16″N 075°27′44″W
Passenger rail stations for Allentown, consisting of the Allentown Terminal Railroad Station served patrons of the Central Railroad of New Jersey (CNJ) and the Philadelphia and Reading Rail Roads (Reading) who jointly operated it. It was constructed in 1888 and 1889. The second station, the Lehigh Valley Railroad Station (LVRR), was built in 1890 and was located directly west of the CNJ station. It served the patrons of the LVRR. Passenger rail service ended in Allentown during the 1960s, the stations became derelict and the Lehigh Valley station was torn down in the 1972. The CNJ/Reading station was restored into a restaurant, since closed. The primary right of way of the LVRR is now the northeast segment of American Parkway.
In addition to the passenger stations, Allentown had a large LVRR freight yard 40°36′26″N 075°27′49″W and two very productive railroad branch lines; The West End, and the Barber Quarry. The Barber Quarry, for the most part, began as a spur breaking off the LVRR main line at about 3d and Union Streets, and ran along the Little Lehigh Creek. It continued west until it turned north along Union Terrace, crossing Hamilton and ending at 20th and Linden Streets. The West End, for the most part, began at Furnace and Ridge Avenue, running northwest to N. 4th and Sumner Avenue, running along Sumner Avenue, turning south and looping past 17th and Liberty Streets then to just north of Gordon Street, terminating at N. 12th Street. Sumner Avenue was later extended along the old right of way to Ridge Avenue. The Barber Quarry spur ended operation about 1977; the West End Spur about 1971.
The CNJ freight yard was established in 1897 and still exists and operates in the Dutch Hill section of East Allentown 40°36′21″N 075°26′03″W. CNJ built a railroad bridge crossing the Lehigh River in 1897 crossing the river at Canal Lock No. 6 to the east bank 40°37′25″N 075°27′32″W, where a passenger line ran parallel to the LVRR line into the CNJ station. From the Allentown station, it then turned east and crossed the Lehigh River and canal with an 1897 bridge (rebuilt 1916) at Lock #8 40°35′58″N 075°27′02″W that connected back to the main CNJ yard and rail line.

- Allentown State Hospital (1912–2010)

1600 Hanover Avenue
Map location: 40°36′53″N 075°25′47″W
Psychiatric hospital that served the counties of Lehigh, Northampton, Carbon, Monroe, Pike, and occasionally eastern Schuylkill. Due to the sharp decline in the need for psychiatric hospitals was closed in 2010.

- Allentown Trust Company (1905–1932)

527 W. Hamilton Street
Map location: 40°36′11″N 075°28′07″W
The Allentown Trust Company is a former bank that collapsed during the Great Repression. It opened in 1907, initially in the Commonwealth Building at 512 Hamilton Street. In 1910, it bought a lot on the northeast corner of Hamilton and Law Streets, and built a two-story, 30-by-104-foot building. Of Greek Revival architectural design, it opened in 1911. Its first floor was the public bank room with tellers and workers at desk, while the second floor would house offices and a director's room. In June 1931, the bank had 12,000 depositors and one million dollars in assets. The run on banks during the Great Depression of 1931–1932 forced the bank to close, and the bank was seized by the Commonwealth of Pennsylvania on June 18th, 1932. Allentown Trust was the third Allentown bank to fail in the summer of 1932. The other defunct banks were Jordan State Bank and Ridge Avenue Deposit and Trust Co. The former bank depositors received some of their money eventually, taking until 1945. About half of its $1 million in liability was returned to depositors.

The closed bank building was bought by the county government of Lehigh County at auction for $59,000, and set aside $25,000 for renovations in its budget. A Lehigh County grand jury recommended buying the bank building and moving offices out of the crowded Lehigh County Courthouse. The county treasurer, tax lien and delinquent tax offices occupied the first floor. The county commissioners, controller, veterans affairs and Americanization offices were among those moved to the second floor.

The county vacated the building in 1999. It was torn down in 2005 along with some other empty buildings and the Colonial Theater. In 2013, the property was purchased by City Center Corporation and today it is part of the Three City Center office building.

- American Steel and Wire Company (1885–1943)

300 block of Lehigh Street
Map location: 40°35′46″N 075°27′58″W
Established as the Iowa Barb Wire Company in 1885, produced barb wire primarily for shipment to the U.S. Midwest. Taken over by U.S. Steel in 1901. During World War I, the plant operated 24 hours a day manufacturing barb wire to ship to the Western Front in France. In 1915, it was a major producer for the Allies, operating 24 hours a day producing more than 100,000 tons of barb wire, staples and nails. to ship to the Western Front in France. The heyday of the plant ended during the Great Depression. When the nation entered World War II, a number of contracts were awarded to the company. But the Allentown mill's distance from the major steel suppliers in Pittsburgh made it unprofitable to operate. In 1943, U.S. Steel closed the wire mill for good. The plant was vacant until the late 1960s when most of the buildings were torn down; one large structure remains on Lehigh Street.

- Apple Hill Ski Area (1962–1978)

Kernville Road and Kern's Dam, Kernville
Map location: 40°37′58″N 075°36′28″W
Opened in 1962 as a local winter ski area, in Kernville, about 10 miles northwest of Allentown. Offered beginner and moderate slopes, rope tow and two T-bar ski lifts, night skiing, snowmaking and a lodge. Also offered a ski school. Closed in 1978, now abandoned and overgrown; ski lodge and other facilities appears to be still standing but very run-down and vandalized

- Arbogast & Bastian (1887–1985)

N. Front and W. Hamilton Streets
Map location: 40°36′29″N 075°27′22″W
Opened in 1887 as a smokehouse by Wilson Arbogast and Morris Clinton Bastian. Produced ready-cured meat for sale. Expanded into a meat packing plant for cattle and hogs, producing a wide variety of meat products for sale at local grocery stores, later supermarkets. Once a national leader in hog slaughtering, the company had the capacity to process most of the 850,000 hogs raised annually in Pennsylvania for slaughtering. In its heyday, Arbogast & Bastian slaughtered an average of 4,000 hogs daily. Filed for bankruptcy in 1984, plant closed in January 1985. The main plant was torn down in the 1990s, today the old main office is the administrative offices for the America On Wheels museum.

- Boyd Theater (1928–1972)

28 N. Ninth Street
Map location: 40°36′07″N 075°28′34″W
Grand 1920s cinema, originally opened as the "New Pergola" Theater in 1926. It was the fourth-largest theater (1,008 seats) in Allentown, behind the State, Rialto and Colonial Theaters. The theater had a stage for vaudeville and stage shows, two balconies and main floor seating. It was renamed the "Embassy" Theater in 1929, and was sold to the A.R. Boyd chain in 1933. The theater was renamed the "Boyd" in 1940. The Boyd showed first-run films for decades and was successful despite the television-era that closed several other theaters in Allentown. It was sold in 1971 and closed when property was sold to PP&L Company for expansion of their headquarters building. Torn down and subsequently rebuilt as office building.

- Camp Crane (1917–1919)

Northwest Corner of 17th and West Chew Streets
Map location: 40°36′05″N 075°29′51″W
World War I use of Allentown Fairgrounds, used by the United States Army Ambulance Service (USAAS) as a training camp. Its mission was to train ambulance drivers to evacuate casualties on the Western Front in France and also in Italy. Returned to fairgrounds use in 1919.

- Capri Theater (1927–1981)

535 W. Hamilton Street
Map location: 40°36′11″N 075°28′09″W
Opened in 1927 as the Peoples Theater and originally seated 638. Over the years it was the Cameo Theater (1928), which closed in 1931. Reopened as the Transit Theater in 1932, closed in 1938, then the Cameo from 1939-1941, and again the Transit from 1942–1957. Reopened in 1963 as the Capri Theater and showed first run films until the late 1970s, then became an Adult theater. Closed in 1981. In 1985, the building was completely renovated and converted into an office building having three floors and 14,000 square feet of space. Today the Capri Marquee remains.

- Center Square Comfort Stations (1919–1972)

Southeast corner, N. 7th and W. Hamilton Streets
Map location: 40°36′07″N 075°28′17″W
Legacy of the early 20th Century when most stores in the Central Business District did not offer public rest rooms. Underground facilities with public attended rest rooms, the Comfort Stations also provided showers for men and bath facilities for women, along with a small store and a shoeshine stand up through World War II. Music was initially provided by a record player, later a radio. By the 1960s, the facilities were simplified to public rest rooms and closed in 1963 by the Board of Health. Re-opened in 1965 by request of the Downtown Merchants, finally closed for good in 1972 as part of the Hamilton Mall renovation of Center Square. Presumably still existing below street level today under extended sidewalk on the SE corner of the Square.

- Central Park (1893–1951)

N. Wahneta Street
Map location: 40°37′19″N 075°25′14″W
Amusement park in the Rittersville section of East Allentown. Opened in 1892. Offered 40 acres of shady walks and ample park benches. It was built in a wooded area with picnic groves, walking paths, a few amusements, theaters and food stands. The first rides were a carousel, a toboggan chute, and the "Razzle-Dazzle". Closed in 1951 after a series of fires, land redeveloped in the early 1960s, last parts of the park torn down in 1964.

- A. Jack Coffield Stadium (1929–1947)

N. 18th and W. Turner Streets
Map location: 40°35′54″N 075°29′42″W
Former high school football facility, opened on 28 September 1929 adjacent to city's Allentown High School. Named for A. Jack Coffield, high school football player who died during a football practice on 26 September 1928. Football began at Allentown High School, now William Allen High School, in 1896, the team playing on any open field that was available. The 15,000-seat capacity Coffield Stadium was the first permanent home for the football team. Over a six-year period from 1941 to 1946, the AHS teams went 60-3-3, outscoring the opposition 1,801 points to only 239. Forty of the sixty wins were by shutouts. Replaced by larger Allentown School District Stadium in 1948. Eventually, the seats at Coffield Stadium were removed in 1955 and became the visitor's stand on south side of the ASD stadium along Linden Street. The facility became an athletic field for the high school for many years, with various buildings for industrial shop classes and the Linden Street Wing of the high school being erected on parts of the old football field. In 1970 the athletic field was redeveloped and the new William Allen High School basketball/natatorium was erected on the site. The Coffield Stadium seats that

were moved to the new stadium were torn down in 2002 as part of the renovation of J. Birney Crumb Stadium.

- Colonial Barbershop (1932–1998)

538 W. Hamilton Street
Map location: 40°36′09″N 075°28′09″W
Classic traditional American Barber Shop. Had art Deco light fixtures, white tin ceiling, shoeshine stand, manicure trays and five chairs. Barber of choice for Allentown politicians and businessmen for decades. Closed upon retirement of longtime owner, Frank Gallucci and building sat vacant for many years. Sold in 2012 to City Center Development Company, today building pending redevelopment.

- Colonial Theater (1920–1988)

513–17 W. Hamilton Street
Map location: 40°36′12″N 075°28′07″W
Golden era stage and cinema in Allentown Central Business district. Over 1,814 seats with two balconies, the largest theater in Allentown. Initially, a silent theater, was also host for traveling jazz spectaculars, specializing in touring groups from Harlem's Cotton Club. In 1929, the theater installed sound equipment for talking pictures. In February 1935, it was the site of a live national radio network broadcast of "Amos and Andy". An extensive renovation in 1963 made it the premiere first-run movie theater in downtown Allentown during the 1960s–1970s. Closed in 1988 and became derelict. Torn down in 2005.

- Drive-In Theaters

Classic, post World War II outdoor Drive-in theaters in Allentown. Open from about April through the end of October of each year, being closed during the winter months. The theaters opened about an hour before sunset each night, and normally showed two films on an average evening, the first being a first-run film, the second being either a "B" movie or a second-run film.

Airport Drive-In Theater (1955–1962)
Airport Road and U.S. Route 22
Map location: 40°38′29″N 075°25′53″W

The Airport Drive-In opened about 1955 on the southeast side of the U.S. Route 22 and Airport Road interchange. At the time of its construction, the area was relatively undeveloped. It held about 800 cars, showing primarily second-run films at reduced rates. Had a full concession stand and children's play area. During its lifetime, the drive-in suffered from noise from airplanes either taking off or landing at the nearby ABE Airport which was a distraction to the moviegoers. It closed in 1962 and the land was sold to developers as Allentown grew. Torn down in 1963/64 the land was first used as a shopping center as well as Catasauqua road which went to Bethlehem. In the 1980s, the Airport Road interchange with Route 22 was expanded into a cloverleaf and the land of the former drive-in is now part of that cloverleaf intersection of Airport Road and US 22; also the Scottish Inn and Suites/Valley Plaza Shopping Center. Catasauqua Road goes right though it.

Boulevard Drive-In Theater (1949–1985)
556 Union Boulevard
Map location: 40°37′13″N 075°27′00″W

Opened on 19 October 1949, the Boulevard Drive-In was located on Union Boulevard in Allentown. It had a great location, with a steep hillside parking lot so the views were really unobstructed. Its capacity was about 600 cars. It had a full concession stand and a children's play area. The theater operated until the fall of 1985 when it was closed. The property was abandoned until 1990 when the main structures including the box office and concession stand were torn down, and the speaker posts removed. Today the facility remains abandoned. The outdoor movie screen is still standing and remnants of the tiered patron parking. Private Property.

Super Skyway Drive-In (1954–1980)
Crackersport and Blue Barn Roads, Kuhnsville
Map location: 40°35′39″N 075°35′15″W

Opened in 1954 with a capacity of 1,000 cars. Was equipped with both stereophonic sound as well as capability to project widescreen films on 2.35:1 wide projection screen for CinemaScope. Served far West End of Allentown along U.S. Route 22, where its screen was visible to passing vehicles. Showed primarily second-run films at reduced admission. Had a full concession stand as well as children's play area. It closed in 1980, and sat vacant for decades. A fire burned down the concession stand and projection booth in 2003. It finally sold in 2004 and in 2005 the property was torn down. Today it is an empty field.

West End Drive-in Theater (1954–1976)
U.S. Route 22 at N. 15th St. exit
Map location: 40°37′13″N 075°30′07″W

Construction began on the drive-in in early 1954. Delayed by some construction issues and strikes, the theater opened in early November with a ribbon-cutting by Mayor Brighton C. Diefenderfer. Managed by the Loews Theatres, the Drive-In had a capacity of about 1,200 cars. Along with a full concession stand and a children's play area. The screen at the Drive-In was 122 × 72 feet in size, which Loews believed was the largest in the United States at that time. The theater operated until the fall of 1976 when it was closed. The property was sold to Bruce L. Rothrock who converted the theater to a Datsun (now Nissan) dealership, which opened in November 1977.

- Dorney Furniture Company (1885–1973)

612 W. Hamilton Street
Map location: 40°36′08″N 075°28′12″W
The manufacturing of furniture was started by Henry Berkemeyer in 1870 at the southwest corner of Race and Hamilton Streets on the site of the Allentown Terminal Station. In 1874 Mr. C.A. Dorney joined Berkemeyer and the name was changed to Dorney, Berkemyer & Company. In 1883, E H Stein purchased the Berkemeyer interest and the business was conducted by these partners until October 1885 when Charles Ziegenfuss purchased an interest in the company. In 1886 the factory was destroyed by fire and immediately rebuilt at a new location across the street at 333-335 Hamilton Street. In 1893, the firm was incorporated under the name C A Dorney Furniture Company, and Stein sold all of his stock to Dorney and Charles Ziegenfuss Sr. Charles Dorney retired in 1898 sold all of his stock to Ziegenfuss however, the name of the firm was unchanged with Ziegenfuss Sr. becoming president of the firm. In 1908 Ziegenfuss & Sons purchased the Troxell home at 612 Hamilton and built a six-story structure which they moved into during 1910.

Dorney Furniture went out of business in 1973, and the building was bought by Schoen Furniture which moved its store there from 18–24 S. Sixth St. It served as a furniture store until 1990. When Schoen's closed, the building was taken over by the Allentown Commercial and Industrial Development Authority and was vacant for over 20 years. At one time, after Schoen's closed, it was an Allentown Rescue Mission thrift store. The authority received an offer of $250,000 from the Delaware-based Charles Street Capital in August 2013 for the redevelopment of the building. The property was renovated and in August 2014, was taken over by Trifecta Technologies, a technology company. The building at 333 Hamilton Street is still standing, and is known as "Catch 22 Nightclub", a rental hall used for private celebrations of various types. It houses three dance floors pool tables big-screen TVs and arcade games. The kitchen serves up burgers fries and hot dogs.

- Dubbs Memorial United Church of Christ (1902–2015)

457 W. Allen Street
Map location: 40°36′42″N 075°28′18″W
Formed in 1902 as a United Church of Christ congregation of 60 worshippers, most of whom broke away from the Salem UCC. In 1904 the Dubbs Sunday School was formed. First church building dedicated on 18 June 1912. A fire in 1959 severely damaged the structure, forcing it to close for a year to rebuild and renovate. Declining attendance forced the church to close in July 2015.

- Duck Farm and Hotel (1883–1925)

2033 Reading Road
Map location: 40°35′37″N 075°29′58″W
Owned by the Griesemer family in what was known as Griesemerville. A stop on the Reading Traction Company's interurban line from West Allentown via Dorneyville, Kutztown to Reading, the Duck Farm and Hotel was a popular day resort just west of the Walnut Street/Reading Road Bridge over Cedar Creek (1824). Among those that came here for a duck dinner was Champ Clark, U.S. Speaker of the House of Representatives from 1911 to 1919. Closed about 1925, later became Union Terrace, now Joseph S. Daddona Lake and Terrace. The hotel remains standing, and now operates as an apartment house.

- Earle Theater (1927–1961)

20 N. 8th Street
Map location: 40°36′08″N 075°28′27″W
First cinema in Allentown to be equipped for synchronized sound films. It opened on 16 December 1927, showing "The Prince of Headwaiters", starring Lewis Stone, a mostly silent film which had scenes in sound. The four-story cinema (its upper floors were professional offices, the 3d and 4th floor having a two-story windowed atrium in the front) operated until February 1961, when it was closed. The last film shown was The Great Impostor, with Tony Curtis. Eventually the property was sold and the theater torn down. Today it is an Allentown Parking Authority parking lot.

- Fenstermacher & Rems Company (1922–1963)

1415 W. Chew Street
Map location: 40°36′09″N 075°29′18″W
Early car and truck dealer in Allentown, originally selling Studebakers, then expanded to sell Hudsons, Terraplanes, then in 1954 began to sell Packards. Later renamed Fenstermacher & Sons. Closed in 1963 along with the demise of the Studebaker-Packard Corporation.

- Food Fair (1953–1970)

1501 Lehigh Street
Map location: 40°34′47″N 075°28′46″W
1401 W. Allen Street
Map location: 40°36′25″N 075°29′26″W
Notable as first modern post-World War II self-service supermarket in Allentown. Lehigh Street location opened in 1953 and the Allen Street location in 1957. Originally called a "Food Department Store", prior to Food Fair, people in Allentown shopped for groceries in local corner grocery stores, bakeries, butcher shops, and farmers' markets. Had notable architecture five-story brick tower with neon Food Fair sign on top of tower attached to buildings. By 1970, both Food Fair stores had added strip shopping centers and had converted to Pantry Pride stores. The Lehigh Street Store is now St. Lukes Family Health Center; Allen Street store is now independent supermarket. Both buildings have five story landmark towers remaining.

- Fountain Brewery Hotel (1869–1948)

16 S. 8th Street
Map location: 40°36′04″N 075°28′24″W
Site of mid-1800s brewery and hotel in Center City Allentown. Established as the Däufer Brewery in 1869 by Henry Köenig and his brother-in-law George and Francis Däufer. Was also a saloon and barber shop, becoming one of the most popular destinations in Allentown. Although the beer was produced at the site, Köenig's beer vault was at Jefferson and Lawrence Streets at the "Beer Vaults and Sommer Garden", now near the Allentown Water Works. After Köenig's death in 1874, the brewery was moved to the Lawrence Street site and the building was turned into the "Fountain Brewery Hotel", although small amounts of beer were brewed at the site (although not during Prohibition) until 1948. Building razed in 1990 and turned into city parking lot.

- Franklin Theater (1913–2008, 700 seats)

429 W. Tilghman Street
Map location: 40°36′48″N 075°28′16″W
Opened as the Franklin Theater in 1913, this neighborhood theater was renamed the Jennette Theater in 1956. The Jeanette Theater it played foreign art films and in 1961 switched over to Adult Porn films, becoming Allentown's main porno house. After the demise of the porn films the Jeannette Theater was closed in 1990. Was renovated in 1992 and reopened as with its original name, the Franklin. The new Franklin showed films for $1 a ticket, and was operating weekends only, but in summer-2008, was closed temporarily. It never reopened. By 2014 it was operating as a church.

- Freeman's Dairy (1927–1986)

737 N. 13th Street
Map location: 40°36′34″N 075°29′18″W
One of several dairies in Allentown, Allentown Dairy was organized in 1915 at West Howard and Turner Streets, and provided milk and dairy products to local grocers and also home delivery. Initially used horse-drawn wagons with rubber tires to deliver products because they were ideal for stop-and-go deliveries. Converted to motorized delivery trucks in the 1930s. At its height in 1953, Freeman's received milk from 300 farms, produced 40,000 quarts a day and employed 110. Freeman's was the last dairy to provide home delivery of milk in Allentown, which ended about 1965. Sold in 1986 to Johanna Farms Inc. of Flemington, New Jersey, and the plant was closed. The former dairy is owned by Richards & Danielson that manufactures flavoring and baking supplies.

- Hess's (1897–1994)

Northeast Corner of 9th and W. Hamilton Street
Map location: 40°36′05″N 075°28′31″W
Largest and most famous Department Store in Allentown, nationally known. Founded by Max and Charles Hess, the store consisted of five floors and over 400,000 square feet of retail space. Became landmark department store with magnificent crystal chandeliers gracing the main hall. It was well known for its fashion apparel as a result of introducing the latest trends from Europe. Extravagant window displays along exterior of main floor. Children delighted at the giant toy soldiers Hess’s used as Christmas decorations in addition to "Pip the Mouse" in a puppet show. Shoppers were treated to the annual May flower show, fashion shows, and celebrity appearances. Hess's Patio restaurant was well known for its strawberry pie and other delicacies. Closed 1994. Building torn down 2000, land redeveloped as The Plaza at PPL Center. Celebrities such as Sonny and Cher Bono appeared at the private night club of Max Hess in the basement of his main house in the Hess compound in west Allentown, which also featured an alligator in a pool in the backyard of the mansion. Max Hess was well known to have lived a rather "Playboy" lifestyle according to those who knew him.

- Horlacher Brewery (1866–1978)

311 W. Gordon Street
Map location: 40°36′38″N 075°27′50″W
Pennsylvania-German Brewery popular for its Nine Months Old "Perfection Beer" ale, specially aged to withstand long-distance deliveries, and its Nine Months Old lager. It also made and bottled porter, sarsaparilla and mineral waters. The brewery was started in 1866 by James Wise at 4th and Hamilton Streets, and Fred Horlacher took over the business in 1882. Horlacher's son, Frederick, moved the business to Gordon Street in 1905. Closed in 1978 with decline of local breweries. Today it is a light industrial complex.

- Homeopathic Healing Art Plaque (1835–1845)

31 S. Penn Street
Map location: 40°36′11″N 075°27′59″W
Marks the location of the world's first medical college exclusively devoted to the practice of homeopathic medicine. Established in 1835, the college went bankrupt in 1845 and relocated to Philadelphia, where it developed into what was Hahnemann University Hospital.

- Hotel Allen (1882–1954)

1 N. 7th Street
Map location: 40°36′09″N 075°28′17″W
Large landmark hotel on Center Square opened in the gilded era. Included a large lobby with a luxurious sitting room. All rooms also had electric lighting, and some rooms even had private baths. Hosted businessmen, wealthy travelers, political figures and other important guests to the city, including three former Presidents of the United States. Closed 1954. Raised in 1956, site became First National Bank building (1958–1995), now being redeveloped as Two City Center office complex.

- Kramer's Music House (1891–1960)

544 W. Hamilton Street
Map location: 40°36′09″N 075°28′09″W
Piano and music store opened by Fredrick F. Kramer Sr. A skilled pianist, among the famous pianists of the day with whom he was friendly was Jan Paderewski, the Polish piano great and first prime minister of Poland after World War I, who Kramer persuaded to play at the Lyric Theater, now Miller Symphony Hall. His office wall was covered with autographed photos of the piano giants of his time he had brought to Allentown. After Kramer’s death in 1937, at age 74, his son Frederick Jr. ran the business for many years. As sheet music and pianos gave way to records, Kramer thrived but changing trends in music led to its final closing in 1960. Building later became the Empire Beauty School which closed in the 1980s. Today, the building is being refurbished as the assembly88 Men's Clothing Store.

- Lehigh Structural Steel Company (1919–1992)

1 W. Allen Street
Map location: 40°36′59″N 075°27′26″W
The company was formed in 1919 during the height of Allentown's industrial era. Its facilities occupied 55 acres along the Lehigh River, consisting of heavy fabrication buildings, tower fabrication and tower galvanizing. Lehigh Steel was the only major steel manufacturer located in Allentown. Steel plant closed 1992, site now part of Neighborhood Improvement Zone (NIZ). Plans announced in 2013 to redevelop the site into a mixed office and residential complex known as The Waterfront.

- Lafayette Hotel (1809–1926)

133–137 N. 7th Street
Map location: 40°36′15″N 075°28′20″W
Former hotel, site of one of the deadliest fires in Allentown history. The oldest hotel in the city at the time of its destruction. Fire caused the deaths of 13 hotel residents and 39 other people were injured. The tragic fire led to Allentown revising its fire code. After the fire the building was imploded, and site was rebuilt and used by Sears Roebuck and Company. Sears left in 1948, the site was used by several businesses until the structures were torn down in the 1980s. It is now a parking lot.

- Leh's (1850–1996)

626 W. Hamilton Street
Map location: 40°36′07″N 075°28′14″W
First Department store in Allentown, opened in 1850 as shoe and boot retailer. Henry Leh manufactured large numbers of boots for Union Army troops during the Civil War, expanded into dry goods and opened a large department store in 1912. Christmas season found the store packed. The arrival of Santa Claus was a major event. Although not quite as flamboyant as Max Hess's showplace at 9th and Hamilton, Leh's still held its own. In the late 1950s an appearance by pop singing idol Frankie Avalon packed the store with teenagers. Closed in 1996 as part of decline of retail shopping in Allentown Central Business District. Redeveloped into Lehigh County Government Center for government office use.

- Lehigh Port (1829–1880)

N. Front Street, between Hamilton and Chew Streets
Map location: 40°36′31″N 075°27′20″W
Prior to the 1830s, Allentown was a small town with only local markets. The arrival of the Lehigh Canal greatly expanded the city’s commerce and industrial capacity. The Canal was built on the east side of the Lehigh River, across from Allentown, although both sides of the river were navigable because of slack water created by Dam 7, later called the Hamilton Street Dam. Boatmen poled their boats across the river above the dam to Lehigh Port, an area along the Lehigh shoreline developed with warehouses and wharves.

Along with the port, the area had a number of industries located near the river. Among these were the J. L. Hoffman sawmill and lumber yard; a gristmill, and the Allbright and Son Tube Works.

With the arrival of the railroads, the importance of the Lehigh River declined. Following the end of the American Civil War, it was taken over by the large Arbogast & Bastian (A&B) meat processing plant. Today, the area is now called the "Lehigh Landing" in the Delaware-Lehigh National Heritage Corridor.

- Lehigh & New England Railroad Office (1895–1961)

443 Hanover Avenue
Map location: 40°36′47″N 075°26′54″W
Lehigh & New England was formed in 1895, primarily as an anthracite coal and cement carrier. The railroad ran from Allentown to Maybrook, New York. In 1904 it was acquired by the Lehigh Coal and Navigation Company. In 1960. the railroad petitioned for abandonment, citing declining traffic. The Central Railroad of New Jersey (CNJ) organized the Lehigh & New England Railway to buy and operate the portions of the line between Hauto and Tamaqua, Pennsylvania, and from Bethlehem and Allentown through Bath to Martins Creek, Pennsylvania, approximately 40 miles (64 kilometres). The line into Allentown ceased operation in 1961. Today the building is used as a community center for Overlook Park

- Lieberman Brewery (1845–1915)

N. 6th and W. Union Streets
Map location: 40°36′00″N 075°28′08″W
The first commercial Pennsylvania-German Brewery in Allentown. Started with English-style ales; by the Civil War was started producing lager beers. Closed in 1910 due to competition with other local breweries. In 1915 it merged with Daeufer Brewery, which was owned by Martin E. Kern. Reopened in 1933 as the Daeufer-Lieberman Brewery, it could not beat the trend toward national beer brands and closed in 1935. Today the site is a light industrial complex.

- Little Palestra (1930–1973)

N. 17th and W. Linden Streets
Map location: 40°35′52″N 075°29′38″W
Former home basketball arena for the Allentown High School, which was later renamed William Allen High School. In its 43 seasons (1930–31 to 1972–73) as home of the Canaries until it was replaced by the current Milo Sewards Gym in the Physical Education Center, the double-decked, 2,200-seat gym hosted 17 East Penn League champions, nine District 11 titlists and all five of the school's state championship squads. Although considered state of the art when it opened, the gym certainly had its quirks that gave the Canaries one of the most unique home-court advantages in the sport. This led to more offence, including the February 19, 1971 evening when the head coach's son, Pat Sewards, scored a record 62 points in a little less than three quarters against Tamaqua HS, the highest one-game scoring for a player at the arena as well as the high school. Razed in 1973, replaced by a library and science building for the high school in 1975.

- Livingston Club (1890–1999)

22 S. 7th Street
Map location: 40°36′05″N 075°28′17″W
Social club, catered primarily to businessmen. Gathering place for powerful businessmen and politicians for relaxation, and to discuss the fate of companies and governmental affairs in Allentown. The Livingston Club was the de facto office of Harry Trexler, the founder of the Lehigh Portland Cement Co., the Pennsylvania Power and Light Co. and the Lehigh Valley Transit Company. Also acted as a hotel, Warren Harding, President of the United States spent a night at the Livingson Club, along with Charles M. Schwab, at the time, the head of Bethlehem Steel. Began a slow decline in importance in the 1960s, as the changing nature of downtown business, the notion that husbands and wives had separate social lives and the concept of local power brokers have all fallen by the wayside. And the departure of the Lehigh Portland Cement Company out of its downtown headquarters building in the early 1990s dealt the club a mortal blow. Attempts to revive it, either as a club or restaurant, foundered. Closed in the late 1990s, building torn down in 1999. It is now a parking lot.

- Mack Trucks (1905–2009)

2050 Mack Boulevard
Map location: 40°34′25″N 075°28′19″W
Manufacturer of heavy industrial trucks, trolleys and buses. Company headquarters moved to Allentown from Brooklyn, New York, in 1905. Mack trucks have been sold in 45 countries. Company headquarters moved to Greensboro, North Carolina, in 2009; however, the manufacturing plant remains in Macungie, a suburb in southwest Allentown. Allentown World Headquarters building, erected in 1970, was sold to New Jersey-based J.G. Petrucci Co., which leases out office space in the building.

Mack Allentown Assembly Plants

Plant #1 40°35′46″N 075°28′05″W
Plant #2 40°35′44″N 075°28′26″W
Plant#3 40°35′40″N 075°28′25″W
Plant #3A 40°35′40″N 075°28′18″W
Plant #4 40°35′37″N 075°28′35″W
Plant #4A 40°35′36″N 075°28′42″W
Plant #5 40°34′56″N 075°28′34″W
Plant #5A 40°34′52″N 075°28′32″W
Plant #5B 40°34′54″N 075°28′14″W
Plant#5C 40°34′45″N 075°28′17″W
The last Mack production plant in Allentown (5C) closed on 23 October 1987. Production, however continues at the Macungie plant which opened in 1976.

- Mealey Auditorium (1910–1961)

423–427 W. Hamilton Street
Map location: 40°36′14″N 075°28′00″W
Large Auditorium, originally built for dances and indoor band concerts. In the 1920s, large touring Big Bands began to perform to Mealey's. Converted to a roller skating rink in the 1940s, then sold to Cata Garment Company in 1954. Used as warehouse space until 1961 when it was acquired by the City of Allentown and redeveloped. Now location of Allentown City Hall.

- Midway Theater (1936–1955)

606 W. Hamilton Street
Map location: 40°36′08″N 075°28′12″W
Building dates to the late 1800s, was known as Ebbeke Hardware Store on ground floor, sold general hardware along with sporting goods equipment. Had professional offices in the upper floors. In the 1920s, was known as Crystal Restaurant. Converted to cinema in 1935 (900 seats). Originally known as the "New Midway", later shortened to "Midway" in 1943. Was one of the first theaters in Allentown to be air conditioned. Closed after a general alarm fire on 22 May 1955. The fire started in the third floor, taking two hours to bring under control. The theater closed, later being rebuilt and opened as Lipkins Furniture. Lipkins closed in 1965, today is Salomon Jewelers.

- Moll Gunsmith Factory (1764–1884)

117–119 N. 7th Street
Map location: 40°36′16″N 075°28′21″W
Colonial gunsmith factory established by American Patriot Johannes (John) Moll about 1764. Moll moved to Northampton Town from Goshenhoppen, 40 miles north of Philadelphia. Moll manufactured Pennsylvania Flintlock Rifles (later known as Kentucky Rifles) for settlers in the local area. During the American Revolutionary War, he enlisted as a Private, Eighth Class, of the Third Company of the First Battalion of Northampton County Militia on June 18, 1777. He was never called to active duty, as he was assigned to manufacture and repair rifles, pistols and bayonets and to manufacture saddles for the Continental Army. After the Revolutionary War, Moll's son and later descendants remained in the gun manufacturing bushiness, producing flintlocks used in the War of 1812. The family remained in Allentown and operated the Gunsmith factory, switching to percussion cap rifles and pistols in the 1820s until John Moll III died in 1883 when it was sold for $7,500, and was possibly torn down. In 1924, the Lafayette Hotel Fire destroyed several properties on N. 7th Street, which were all torn down afterward and turned into a parking lot.

- Orpheum Theater (1906–1924)

State Theater (1924–1953)
35 N. 10th Street
Map location: 40°36′14″N 075°28′12″W
The Orpheum was the first major vaudeville theater in Allentown with a seating capacity of 1,421. Live variety shows, it mixed jugglers, song-and-dance teams and acrobats, comedians and other live performers. Allentown was a tryout venue for vaudeville acts and those who did well went to major cities, including Philadelphia, New York City, and Boston. Eddie Cantor, Fred and Adele Astaire, Jack Benny, Bing Crosby, Buster Keaton and Will Rogers all played at the Orpheum.

By 1920, vaudeville had been taken over by silent films and in 1924 the Orpheum was converted to The State movie theater. It was the third-largest theater in Allentown. Converted to sound films in the early 1930s, closed in December 1953 due to declining attendance caused by Television. Purchased for $50,000 by Park and Shop Inc. and torn down in April 1954 to make way for a parking lot.

- Palace (later Good's) Pharmacy (1900–1947)

602–604 W. Hamilton Street
Map location: 40°36′09″N 075°28′11″W
Classic early 20th Century Pharmacy/Soda Fountain. Served various sodas and ice creams as well as dispensing perspiration medicines, selling sundry products and magazines. Had several tables for patrons. The Palace Pharmacy was located at the southwest corner of 6th and Hamilton Streets.
The structure was built by John E. Lentz between 1865 and 1867 in the then-popular Italianate style. The pharmacy opened on December 24, 1900, owned by Robert Good. The name apparently changed to Good's in the early 1930s. Good used the ground floor for his pharmacy, and the upper floors were rented as offices.
Robert D. Good called it quits at the pharmacy and it was closed on January 5, 1948, due to rising rents. At that time, it was the oldest drugstore in the city that had not been remodeled. The space has been occupied by several restaurants over the decades since and today is Pastaficio, a popular Italian lunch restaurant.

- Pat's (later Sal's) Spaghetti House (1954–1988)

20 N. Sixth Street
Map location: 40°36′12″N 075°28′12″W
Former Italian restaurant, landmark in the city. Served pasta, beef stew, ice cream and pie. The building was erected in 1898 as a florist shop for brothers John and Charles Horn. Closed and re-opened in 1954 as Pat's Spaghetti House by owner Pat DeMilio; became Sal's Spaghetti House in 1977 when Salvatore Poidomani took over the restaurant. The property was sold to the Mendelson Family Trust in 1988 after Poidomani retired. Property was vacant until the early 2000s when the City of Allentown seized the property. Building was in poor repair and city inspectors found dangerously unstable flooring, rotted beams and overall decay and said a heavy snowfall might have collapsed the roof. The building was raised in 2008, re-built as the Cosmopolitan Restaurant and nightclub. The new structure has carved molding and other features into the structure. The former elaborate neon sign was salvaged and is being stored in a warehouse owned by a nonprofit entity for restoration. The Cosmopolitan occasionally offers menu selections from the former restaurant using original recipes.

- Pergola Theater (1907–1926)

902 W. Hamilton Street
Map location: 40°36′05″N 075°28′34″W
Opened originally as a penny arcade, bowling alley and billiard parlor, the Pergola was converted into a silent film theater about 1910. Showed early Tom Mix westerns, films by Charlie Chaplin, Mary Pickford and D. W. Griffith among others. Notable for being possibly the first theater in the United States to show a Kinemacolor film in 1910, mostly travelogues. Admission was a nickel, a reserved seat cost 10 cents, and the average length of a film was an hour. Also offered vaudeville shows. Closed in 1926 and torn down for construction of PP&L Building. A "new" Pergola was built behind the PP&L Building, opening in 1926 at 9th and Court Streets. It was renamed the "Embassy" in 1929 and later the "Boyd" in 1940. It was demolished in 1971 for construction of additional PP&L office space.

- Rialto Theater (1921–1980)

943 W. Hamilton Street
Map location: 40°36′02″N 075°28′39″W
Allentown's first cinema, opened on April 1, 1921, second-largest theater (1,679 seats) in Allentown. Construction of the theater was begun in 1918 by developers Max Chanock and Max Sanderowitz. Its construction took place in two stages. The first part, a series of stores, shops and apartments, along with the theater's lobby, was completed rapidly. However World War I caused a shortage of building materials. So the theater, a separate structure, was not completed until 1921. The theater had a capacity of 2,500, with stage for vaudeville and stage shows, two balconies and main floor seating. A symphony orchestra and grand organ were among the refinements for the moviegoers of the silent picture era and in 1929, the theater was converted from silent to sound films.

The lobby section of the theater was the site of a general alarm fire on April 1, 1946 causing the death of Assistant Fire Chief Marcus "Mark" Good. The Rialto theater itself, suffering only slight smoke and water damage re-opened with a new lobby on Jan. 28, 1947. The theater remained a first-run cinema until 1971 when it was sold and the new owners turned it into an adult film venue. Closed in 1980, the cinema auditorium was demolished and replaced by a parking deck. Lobby section turned into offices for PP&L, still in use.

- Peter Rhodes House (1762)

107 N. 7th Street
Map location: 40°36′14″N 075°28′20″W
2d oldest building in Allentown, built by American Patriot Peter Rhodes in 1762. Tailor and storekeeper, later served on the Committee for Public Safety in Northampton Towne during the Revolutionary War. Later Rhodes was a judge of the local courts. He was the President Judge of the newly formed Lehigh County, also the first Burgess of Northampton Towne in 1811. Died in 1814. Home was rebuilt in 1890, a 3d story added and turned into a rooming house. Was later reduced in size about 1924 after the Lafayette Hotel Fire and Sears Roebuck established a store in Allentown afterward in the 100 block of N. 7th Street. Today the south part of the home (about half) still stands as part of a townhouse/local business.

- Sears, Roebuck & Company Building (1948–1966)

600-606 N. 7th Street
Map location: 40°36′38″N 075°28′34″W
Opened in 1948. Was the first major department store not located in the Hamilton Street central shopping district. Sears had opened an Allentown store in the 1930s at the site of the old Lafayette Hotel which had burned down in 1926. After World War II, the wartime restrictions were ended and the company built a new store, closer to the new suburbs that were growing along 7th Street and MacArthur Road in Whitehall Township. Sears later moved to the new Whitehall Mall in 1966 as the expansion of shopping along MacArthur Road was developing. For many years after, was used by the Levine's Fabric store, a textile business. Today the building is being used by the Supremo Market, a Latin Supermarket.

- Strand Theater (1917–1953)

14–16 N. 8th Street
Map location: 40°36′07″N 075°28′26″W
Opened as large (1,000-seat) silent movie theater in 1917 as spinoff of Lyric Theater so Lyric could concentrate on stage plays and vaudeville acts. Had a large organ with full-time organist for playing silent film music scores. Adapted to sound films about 1929. The Strand was one of several large ornate movie theaters in Allentown Central Business District, providing Saturday morning matinees, serials, and multiple film showings daily. The movie theater was closed in 1953 due to the popularity of television. Theater lobby became retail space, auditorium became warehouse and distribution center for Farr Shoes. For decades after its closure as a movie theater, its large theater marquee remained attached to the front of the building, used for advertising of the retail store in the front lobby section. Sold 1986, auditorium torn down for parking lot use. Lobby section renovated during the early 2000s, now used for retail and office space.

- Towne Theater (1918–1982, 850 seats)

343 N. Sixth Street
Map location: 40°36′29″N 075°28′19″W
Originally Lotus Theater, opened about 1918 owned by the Herrity Brothers at 6th and Gordon Streets. In 1922, the theater organ was upgraded to a Mueller. It was renamed Towne in 1932. The Towne was a classic neighborhood theater. Normal showtimes would be from about 12:00 noon until 11 pm. On Saturdays, would open at 10:00 am. Would show several serials, cartoons, and westerns aimed at children and teenagers. The Towne was primarily a second-run theater that showed Hollywood films after their first run showing at the major theaters on Hamilton Street. Features would start at 5:00 pm and be shown until the theater would close between 10 and 11 pm. Would also show short features as well as Movietone News clips. The Towne ended feature film showings in 1957 due to a lack of attendance due to television. It became a foreign art film theater until 1961, when a lack of attendance caused it to convert to an adult porn theater until 1982 when it was finally closed due to wide availability of porn on home video. Totally renovated in the fall of 1982, now multi-family apartment complex.

- Traylor Engineering (1905–2011)

602 S. 10th Street
Map location: 40°35′42″N 075°28′36″W
Former industrial plant comprising seven buildings totaling over 260,000 square feet on over 17 acres of land. Dominated by a 121,000 square foot principal site. Initially a manufacturing plant for large mining industry equipment which was sold worldwide. After the start of World War I, Traylor Engineering provided artillery shells for the British military during World War I. Later manufactured ship engines, boilers and other marine parts for the United States after the US entry into the war. Was again a vital defense contractor during World War II. Sold in 1959 to the Fuller Company, manufactured mining and crushing equipment until the early 2000s. Last tenant was Allentown Metal Works which took over the plant in 2008. Visited by President Barack Obama in December 2009 as part of his effort to stimulate the economy, the plant closed in January 2011 after a dispute between the owners and the Allentown Commercial and Industrial Development Authority. The vacant site was visited by U.S. presidential candidate Mitt Romney in June 2011 and filmed a campaign commercial there. Facility now closed, owned by Allentown Redevelopment Authority, although the buildings at the site are now over 100 years old.

- Trexler Lumber Yard (1903–1973)

1616 W. Liberty Street
Map location: 40°36′12″N 075°29′40″W
Large lumber yard, origins dating to 1856. One of the largest lumber yards of its kind in the eastern United States, formerly owned by General Harry C Trexler, was primary family business and fortune. Its roofed lumber shed was called the largest of its kind in the world. Destroyed by fire in General Alarm blaze on March 31, 1973, one of the largest and most intense fires in Allentown history. During the fire, the thermometer on a home at 437 N. 16th Street recorded 120 degrees. Spectators a block away could feel the heat on their faces. On September 25, 1973, the Charles Kline Lodge of Allentown's B'nai B'rith purchased for $70,000 the former lumber yard for the construction of what are now the B'nai B'rith Apartments.

- The Upper Story (1967–1980)

930 W. Hamilton Street, Second Floor
Map location: 40°36′02″N 075°28′35″W
The Upper Story was the first 1960's counter-culture "Head Shop" in Allentown. The store sold incense, flower power buttons, peace signs, floppy hats, Nehru jackets and Landlubber jeans. It was one of the few places you could buy The Village Voice, Rolling Stone magazine and albums by Janis Joplin, The Doors, Cream, and Jimi Hendrix. The stairs leading to the store were painted in psychedelic Day-Glo paint and illuminated with black lights. By the late 1970s, the counterculture of the 1960s had faded into history and the store was closed. Today, the building is a multi-story office building that shows no evidence of its 60's counter-culture past.

- J.B. Van Sciver Furniture Co. (1937–1983)

1002 W. Hamilton Street
Map location: 40°36′00″N 075°28′40″W
The J.B. Van Sciver Furniture Co. was a furniture company, founded by Joseph Bishop Van Sciver and later run by his sons, Joseph Bishop Van Sciver Jr., Lloyd Van Sciver, and Russell Van Sciver. The company was formed in Camden, New Jersey, in 1881 and opened an Allentown store in 1937. In 1983, it closed down. Today the building is used by the Pennsylvania Department of Transportation.

- Venerable Shoe and Boot Factory (1882–1900)

825 W. Hamilton Street
Map location: 40°36′05″N 075°28′27″W
Owned by William Roney, the "Venerable Shoe and Boot Factory" is notable for the introduction of electrical power into Allentown. In 1882, Roney bought a Westinghouse A.C. Dynamo to power his factory. In 1883, a number of nearby businesses bought power from him, and he expanded as the Allentown Electric Light and Power Company. The Shoe and Boot Factory was out of business by 1900, as the building is listed as being subdivided into several stores, however, the electric utility remained in business.

In 1907, the Lehigh Valley Transit Company erected a large electrical powerhouse to run its streetcar system at Second and Front Street ( 40°36′26″N 075°27′29″W ). The powerhouse generating equipment included 500, 1,000 and 2,500 horsepower steam turbines. Along with the generating plant, the area included a large marshaling yard for streetcars and freight trollies that facilitated the delivery of coal for the boilers that powered the steam turbines.

General Harry Trexler, one of the principals of the Lehigh Valley Transit Company and a prominent businessman, was the principal behind the consolidation of these small utilities from Allentown along with others in the Coal Regions and Eastern Pennsylvania. This amalgamation became the Pennsylvania Power and Light Company in 1920. Pennsylvania Power and Light Company was renamed PPL Corporation in February 2000.

- Victor Theater (1910–1928)

716 W. Hamilton Street
Map location: 40°36′06″N 075°28′20″W
Opened in 1910 as an early Nickelodeon style theater. Building dated to the mid-1800s. Had a narrow entry on Hamilton Street, located on either side of a ticket booth, and came in under the screen. Legend has it that there was always large cat on the premises to help control the theater’s rat population which you often felt running around at your feet. The building was absorbed, along with the adjoining buildings, into one large structure that was modernized in 1928 for the headquarters of Lehigh Portland Cement.

- 'Village Inn Restaurant (1936–1998)

4104 W. Tilghman Street
Map location: 40°35′30″N 075°32′53″W

- Walps Restaurant (1940–1998)

Northeast Corner of Union Boulevard at Airport Road
Map location: 40°37′28″N 075°26′32″W
Notable Pennsylvania Dutch restaurants. Both built before World War II on Tilghman Street when it was still designated as US 22. The Village Inn was located in West Allentown, Walps in East Allentown, about six miles apart. Both restaurants were family-owned and welcomed thousands of families celebrating milestone birthdays and anniversaries and toasting newlyweds at wedding receptions, high school reunions and other occasions. Many local and out-of-town celebrities dined at the restaurants. Both were purchased by Rite-Aid and closed the day after Thanksgiving in 1998. Both buildings were torn down about 2002. Walps was replaced by super-pumper convenience store. Village Inn torn down and property redeveloped into several small business buildings.

- Western Electric (1948–1995)

555 Union Boulevard
Map location: 40°37′19″N 075°27′09″W
The Western Electric plant on Union Boulevard was announced on October 11, 1945, after a nationwide search to locate a new manufacturing plant. Delays caused by shortages of construction material and the postwar Federal Civilian Production Board put a freeze on any new building projects that did not involve easing the national housing crunch delayed the opening of the plant until 11 October 1948. The Western Electric plant would be 250,000 square feet in size, cost $2.5 million and employ both men and women. The area's trained female workforce was cited as a particular reason for picking Allentown. The facility would involve glass working and the production of vacuum tubes and quartz crystals. However, advances in technology meant that the plant's planned use would be very different.
With Bell Lab scientists and a skilled Allentown labor pool, Western Electric soon found itself at the forefront of the revolution in electronics. The plant would produce a tiny metal device about the size of a shoelace tip, serves nearly all the functions of a conventional vacuum tube, the transistor. On 1 October 1951, the world's first transistor production began at the Allentown plant. It would become the backbone of a communications revolution. Over the years the Allentown plant was at the forefront of the postwar electronics revolution. In the years to come, work at the plant included the development of the Telstar communications satellite and the first United States crewed space flights. By 1964 there were 6,000 employees working at the facility. Western Electric came to an end in 1995 when AT&T changed the name of AT&T Technologies to Lucent Technologies. Lucent was merged with Alcatel SA of France in 2006, Allentown manufacturing facility was subsequently closed and is currently vacant.

- Wetherhold & Metzger (1908–1987)

719 W. Hamilton Street
Map location: 40°36′07″N 075°28′21″W
Local Shoe Store in the Allentown area. George A. Wetherhold and Owen W. Metzger opened their first store at 714 Hamilton Street in 1908. However, according to Metzger, "It was on the wrong side of the street", and in 1918, the store moved to the more prominent north side, at 719 Hamilton Street, where it remained for the next 69 years. Wetherhold & Metzger also had an uptown store in the 900 block of Hamilton Street. Over the decades, Wetherhold owned and operated about 11 stores under the names of Wetherhold, Shoe Rack, Kristy Shoes and Shoes by Gina. The store closed and was sold in May 1987 with the demise of the Hamilton Street shopping district. In September 2012, the store at 719 Hamilton was demolished, along with most of Allentown's mercantile history as a part of the Onc City Center/PPL Plaza/Reconnaissance Hotel construction project.

- Wright Montessori School (1915–1957)

933 N. Ott Street
Map location: 40°36′17″N 075°31′06″W
Private school, founded by Ada V. Wright in 1915, based on education principles of Maria Montessori. A teacher in the Allentown School District, she opened her first private school in 1915 at her father's home at 1449 W. Turner Street with 15 students. In 1922 the school opened at a larger home at 1536 Walnut Street. The school moved to 922 Ott Street in 1940. The school on Ott street was built about 1917 by Maximilian Juruick, an engineer as a private home. It was the first home built on Ott Street. Juruick and his family moved out in 1923. It was a Muhlenberg College fraternity house during the late 1920s. In 1931, the Great Depression reduced the number of students at the college, and the fraternity closed its doors. Over the years, the school educated many of Allentown's wealthy students and future business and civic leaders. in 1950 it was the first co-educational private school in the state to have met the academic standards for membership in the Pennsylvania Association of Private Academic Schools. The school closed in 1957, shortly after Wright's retirement. Today a private residence, many of the books used by the school from the 1930s to 1950s are in storage inside the home's attic

== See also ==
- Culture of Allentown, Pennsylvania
- List of city parks and recreation facilities of Allentown, Pennsylvania
