= Allen Theater =

Allen Theater may refer to:

- Allen Theatre, a theater in downtown Cleveland, Ohio
- Allen Theater (Allentown, Pennsylvania), a former cinema in Allentown, Pennsylvania
