= Gauff (disambiguation) =

Coco Gauff (born 2004) is an American tennis player.

Gauff may also refer to:

- Gauff Hill, incorporated community in Pennsylvania, US
- Gauff-Roth House, historic house in Pennsylvania, US

== See also ==
- Goff (surname)
