= Hotel Allen =

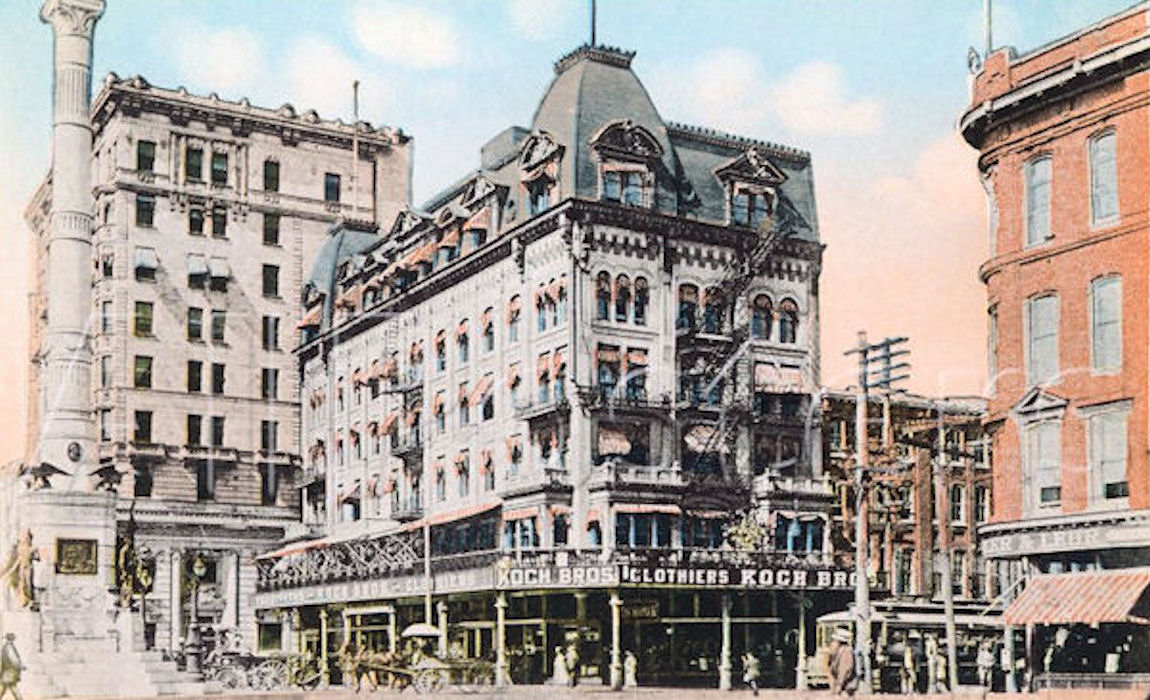
- 1912 postcard of Hotel Allen on Center Square

- Location within Pennsylvania
- 40°36′09″N 75°28′17″W
- Location: 1 North 7th Street, Allentown, Pennsylvania, U.S.

History
- Built: 1882
- Demolished: 1956

The Hotel Allen was a hotel in Allentown, Pennsylvania. It was demolished in 1956.

== History ==
=== Origins ===
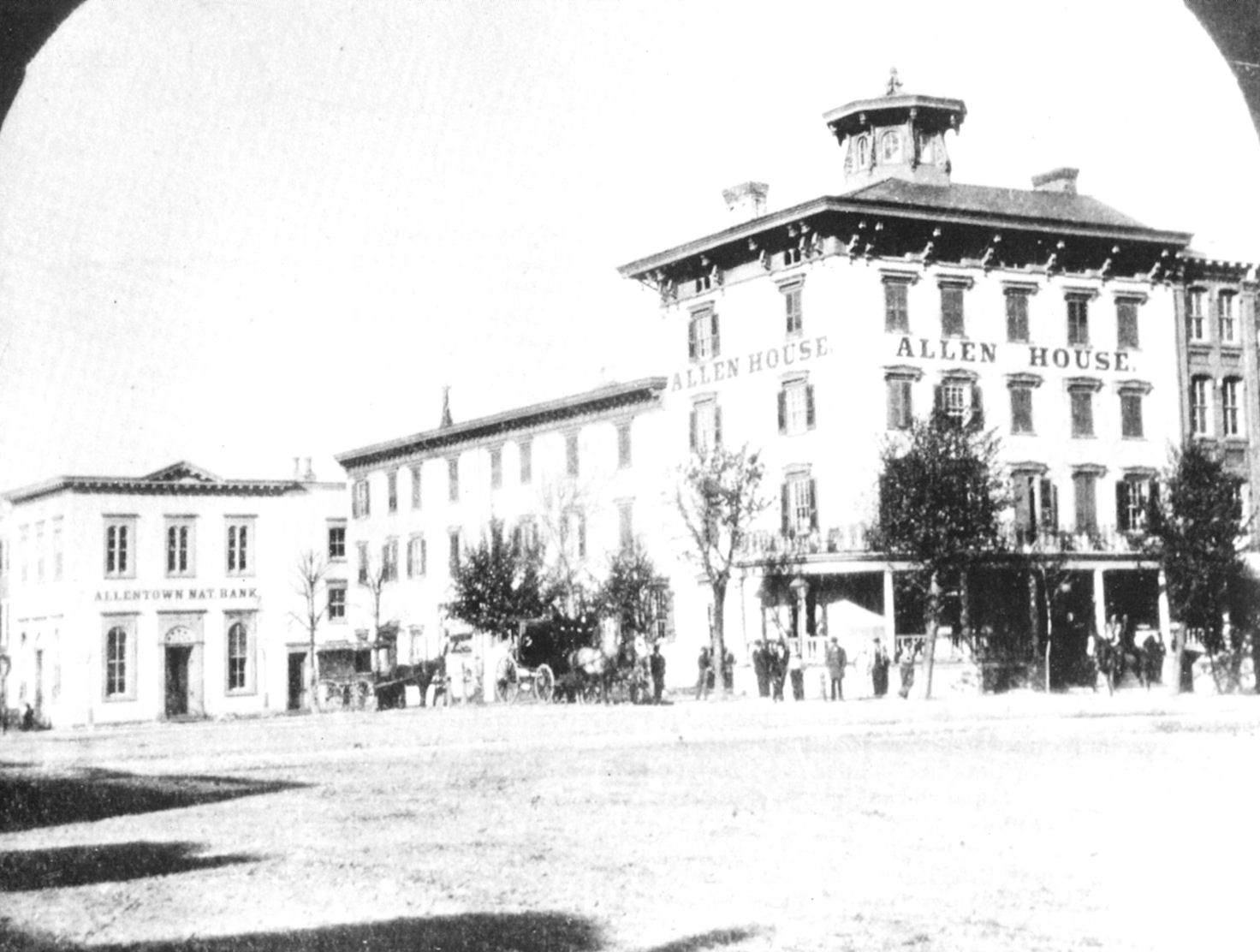
Allen House hotel in 1870

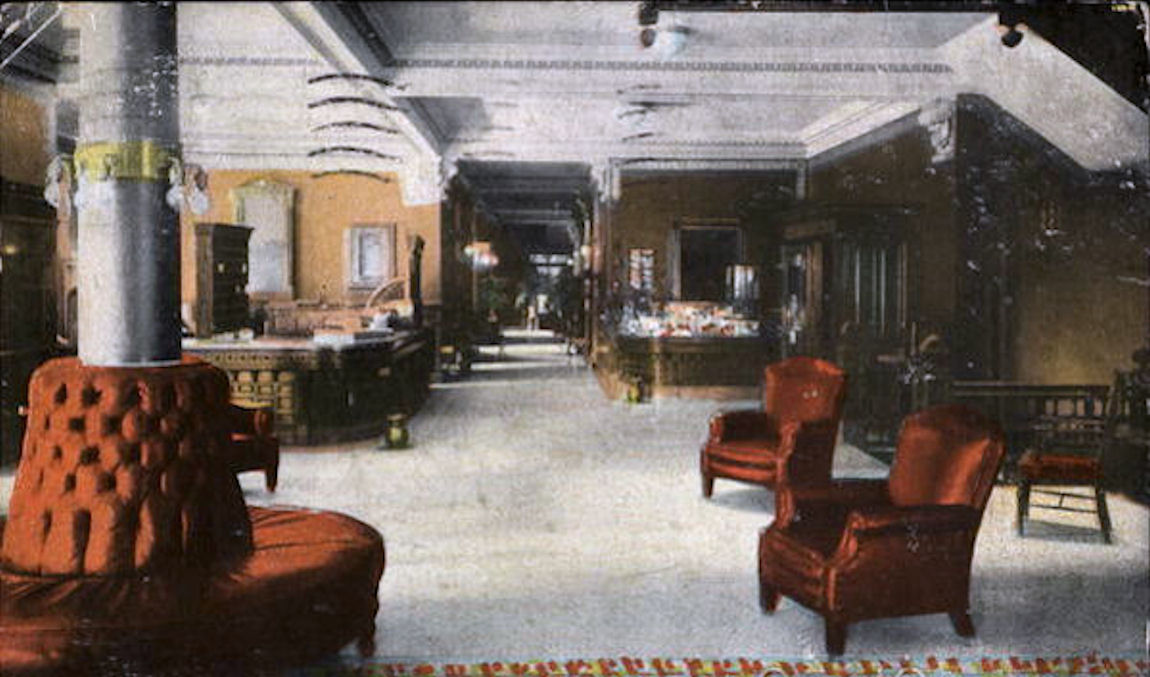
Postcard showing the lobby of the Hotel Allen, Allentown, Pennsylvania about 1912

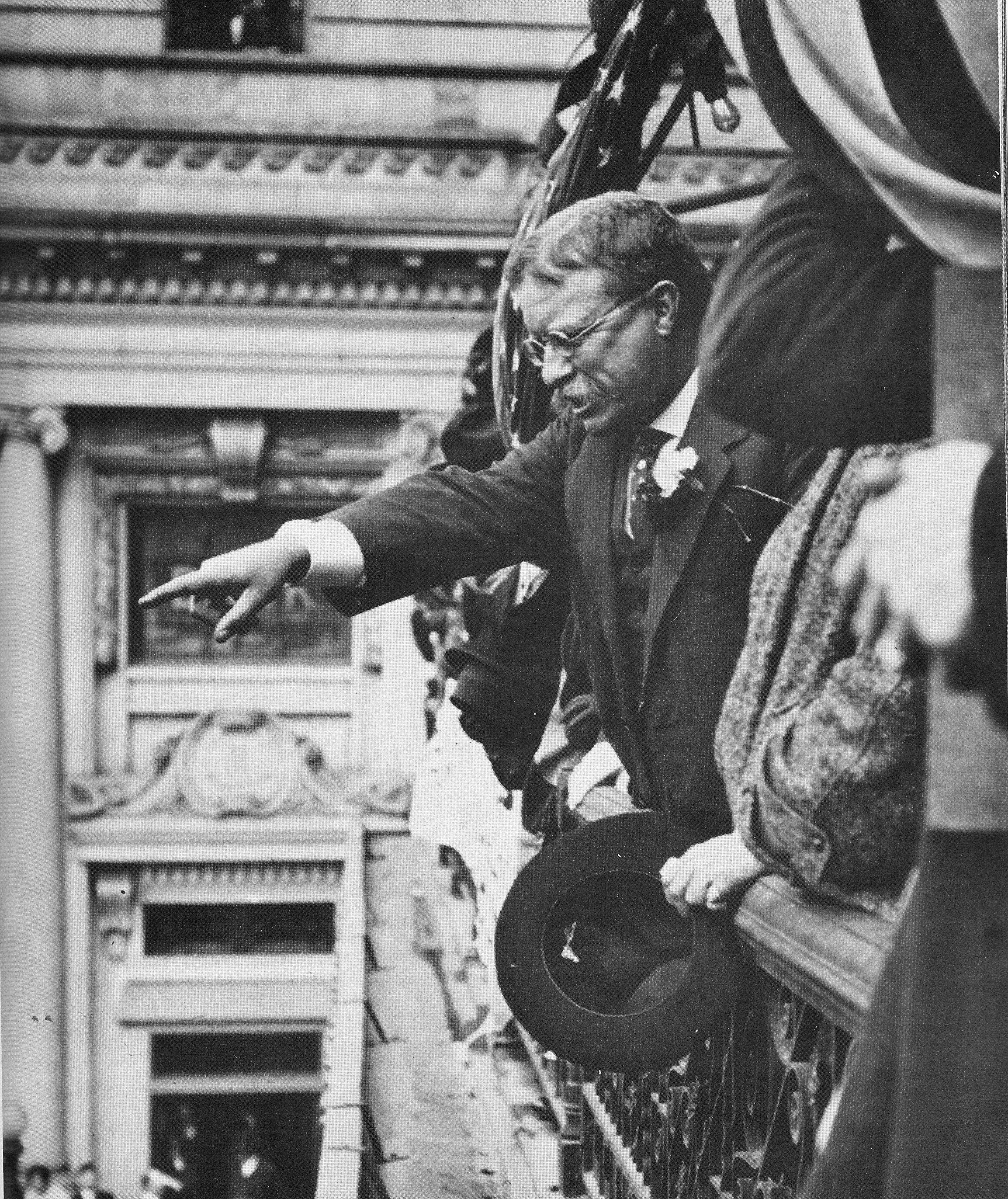
Theodore Roosevelt speaking from the balcony of Hotel Allen, 1914

The northeast corner of Center Square (Seventh and Hamilton Streets) in Allentown was the site of several inns and hotels since its founding in 1762. Sometime in 1762 a man named George Wolf established at the corner of Hamilton and Allen (as Seventh Street was then called) an inn. By doing that he became the first known operator of what they called then, “a house of entertainment for man and beast” in little Northampton town. The name of the inn, not recorded until 1773, was the King of Prussia. Reportedly, the inn's sign featured an image that was supposed to represent Frederick the Great, the military monarch who was then occupying the Prussian throne.

Wolf left Allentown in 1768 and his inn passed to other hands. Because of its central location it became a focal point of activity. Beginning in 1809 George Savits, the first Postmaster of Allentown, purchased the property who renamed it the Square and Compass, in 1810.

The inn received a face lift and new lease on life under the name of Allen House, which was adopted about 1859. By the late 1870s, with the arrival of stagecoach lines and railroads bringing more guests than ever, the wooden Allen House hotel was falling apart. It was replaced by a six-story brick and steel hotel, the Hotel Allen. Built in the Victorian Style, it was designed to be the grand hotel of the city. Opened in 1882, the six-story, 150 room building’s graceful form defined the northeast corner of Center Square.

=== Victorian Era ===
The Allen Hotel's first floor included a large lobby with a luxurious sitting room. All rooms also had electric lighting, and some rooms even had private baths. Also several retail stores, including the Koch and Shankweiler men's clothing store were located. An observation tower, located on the seventh floor, offered a panoramic view of the city. During the 1890s, it was connected to both the Lehigh and Consolidated phone systems, the region's two phone companies.

The hotel became a landmark in Allentown, hosting businessmen, wealthy travelers, political figures and other important guests to the city. Located in the heart of the Central Business district, it was a stop on the new electric street railway when it opened in 1892, bringing visitors to the city directly from the Lehigh Valley Railroad Station at Third and Hamilton streets. Among those entertained here before speaking engagements at the Lyric Theater (now Miller Symphony Hall) were presidents Theodore Roosevelt, William Howard Taft and Woodrow Wilson. Roosevelt even spoke in 1914 to a cheering crowd from its balcony. The Hotel Allen’s food was considered the best in the city and during the summer an orchestra performed regularly on what was called its “rustic porch garden.”.

=== Jazz Age ===
After World War I, the level of accommodations in Allentown was on the mind of city leadership. Allentown was growing rapidly due to industrialization and its leading hotels, such as the Allen, as well as the Lafyette and American were deemed as outdated due to their wooden construction. The Hotel Hamilton, next to the Lehigh County Courthouse had burned down in a massive fire in 1919. In 1921 the Hotel Bethlehem had opened and in 1924 the Hotel Easton, both concrete and brick structures. Allentown's city fathers said, that the region's largest city lacked a modern fireproof building like its rivals. Unfortunately it took a tragic, deadly fire for the city to finally get one with the Lafyette Hotel fire in 1926 The opening of the Americus Hotel in 1927 severely affected the Hotel Allen, with the new, larger and modern Americus attracting many of the visitors to Allentown that previously used the Allen.

=== Decline ===
The Great Depression and World War II also fueled the decline of the hotel and its finances. The hotel was used extensively during World War II but in the postwar era, it was clear that it had become outdated, and the property was condemned by Commonwealth building inspectors in November 1946. The sudden closure of the hotel forced about 100 permanent residents to be evicted. The owners at the time, the Koch brothers who operated a clothing store on the ground floor, was allowed to remain open. The property was completely rebuilt between 1949 and 1952, the basement and the first three stories were modernized and turned into a three-story clothing store.

The First National Bank, then located adjacent to the hotel at 13 North Seventh Street purchased the property in 1955. Plans were made to demolish the 70-year-old hotel which began in the spring of 1956. A new First National Bank building in the modified Art Moderne style opened in 1958 and was enlarged in the early 1970s. After a series of bank mergers the First National Bank closed its doors in the early 1990s and the property was vacant for about fifteen years. The First National Bank building was itself demolished in 2012, and is now the site of the new Two City Center office complex, currently under construction with a planned 2014 opening date.

== See also ==
- List of historic places in Allentown, Pennsylvania
