= Neuweiler Brewery =

- U.S. National Register of Historic Places
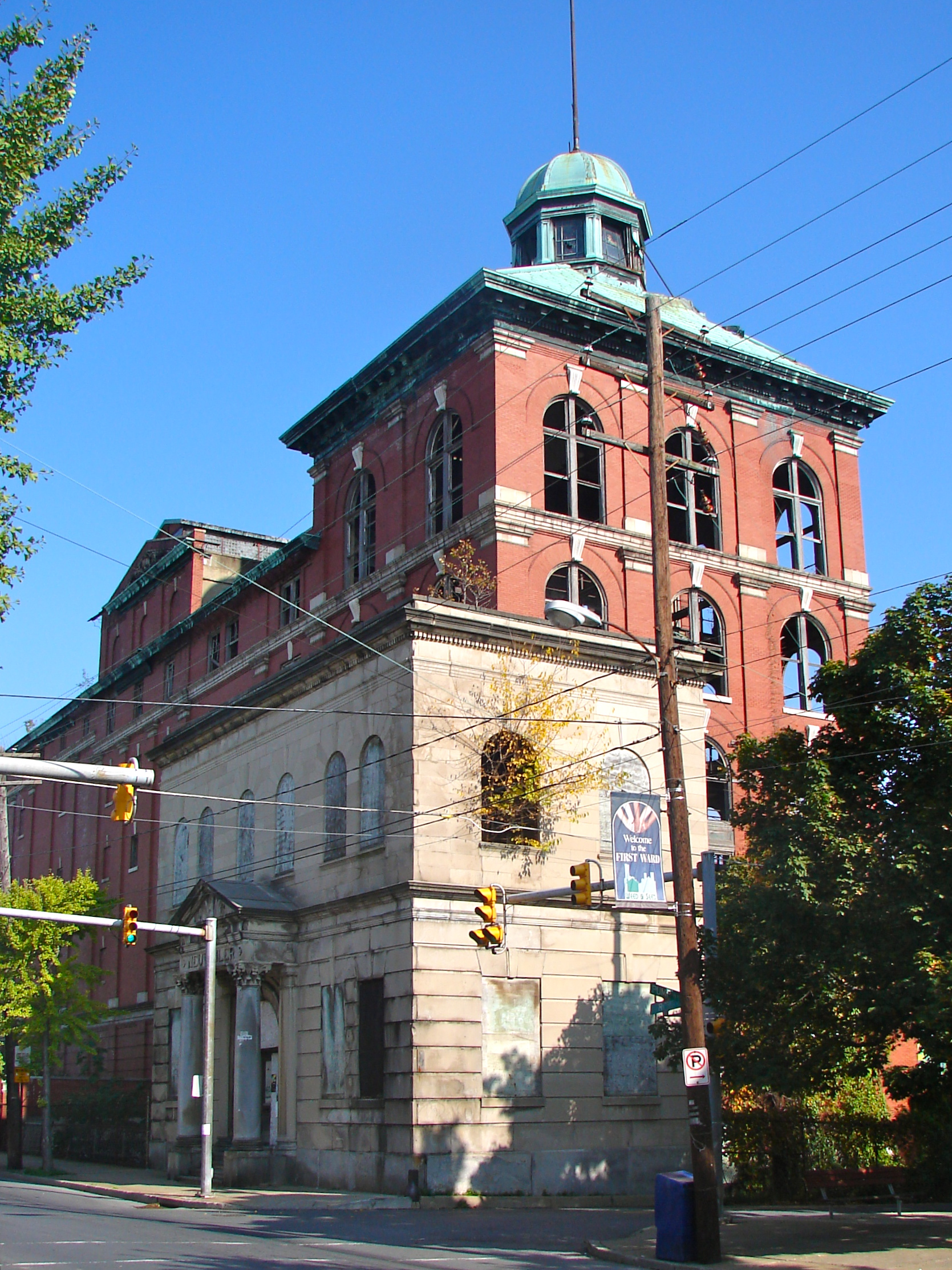
- Neuweiler Brewery in Allentown, Pennsylvania in October 2011

- Location within Pennsylvania Location within the United States
- Location: 401 North Front Street, Allentown, Pennsylvania, U.S.
- Coordinates: 40°36′40″N 75°27′29″W
- Area: 4.5 acres (1.8 ha)
- Built: 1911-1913
- Architect: Peuckert & Wunder
- NRHP reference No.: 80003554
- Added to NRHP: June 27, 1980

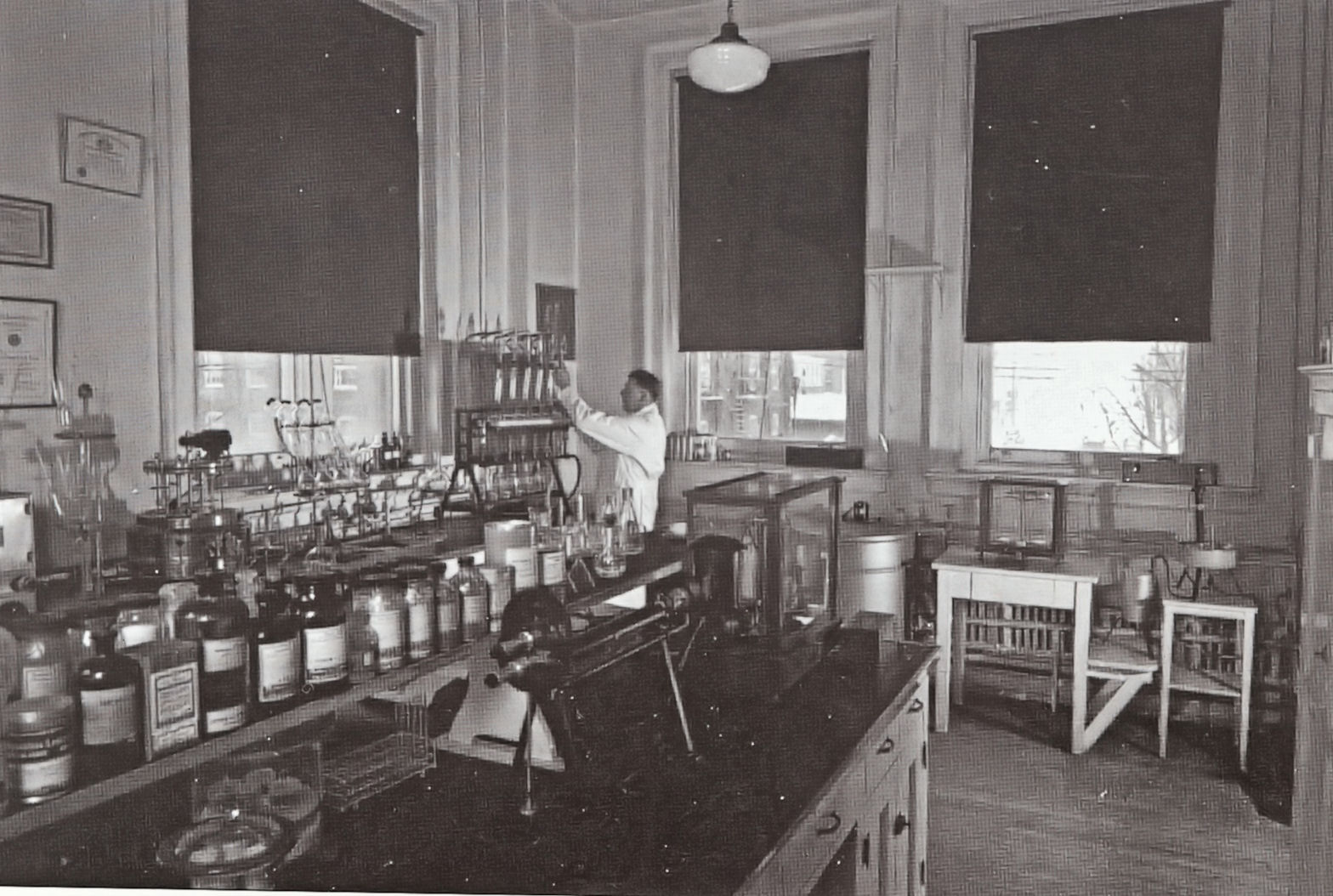
A 1915 photo of the Neuweiler Brewery laboratory in Allentown, Pennsylvania, where the various Neuweiler brews were made.

The Neuweiler Brewery, also known as the Germania Brewery, is a historic brewery complex located in Allentown, Pennsylvania. Built between 1911 and 1913, the complex consists of the office building, brew house, stock house, pump house, wash house, chemistry lab building, boiler room, bottling house, garage, fermenting cellar, and smokestack with the name "Neuweiler" on it.

The office building is a two-story, brick and granite building. The remaining buildings in the complex are built of brick. The brew house stands six-stories, and has a copper hipped roof with cupola. The stock house is a long, narrow four-story building. The brewery closed in 1968.

== History ==
Neuweiler Brewery was founded by Louis Neuwiler, who bought out longtime local brewer Benedict Nuding in 1900. Nuding's operation was limited by its location, and in 1911 Neuweiler and his son, Charles, eager to expand, hired Philadelphia architects Peukert and Wunder to build a new complex some distance away, at Front and Gordon streets.

The brewery, featuring its own generators for electric power, opened in 1913. By 1932, the brewery buildings and the warehouse building were joined as one structure, and the former machine warehouse became an independent electric plant with an ammonia tank and ice machine. A pump warehouse had been added onto the northwest corner of the former stock warehouse, and a two-story bottling plant with a basement was located to the north of the other buildings. Neuweiler produced several brands of beer: Light Lager, Cream Ale, Stock Ale, Premium Ale, Bock (seasonal), Half & Half, Porter, Stout and Hochberg. Most were available in the 12 oz. "Steinies" or Export bottles, quarts, cans or kegs. When in full operation, Neuweiler's was one of Allentown's largest employers.

By 1950, the bottling plant was extended to the corner of North Front Street and Liberty Street, the stock warehouse was extended toward North Front Street, and a tile ash hopper was located behind the boiler house.

Brewery operations ceased in 1968 due to competition from national breweries; however, the Neuweiler recipes and brand names were kept alive via the purchase by the Ortlieb Brewery of Philadelphia, which also bought the Fuhrmann & Schmidt Brewing Company in 1966. After the brewery's closure, the F&S Brewery produced several of the Neuweiler beers (Porter, Light Lager and Cream Ale) from around 1970 until closing in 1975. After F&S closed, the Ortlieb brewery continued Neuweiler Cream Ale at the Philadelphia plant until the late 1970s.

The building was abandoned for over two decades until the bottling house was leased to Ingnatios Hadjiloukas from 1992 to 1998. Mr. Hadjiloukas operated a pesticide, herbicide and detergent re-manufacturing business under the company names of J.L. Hoffman Company and Trading, Inc. for a period of approximately ten years. The site was abandoned in the fall of 1998 and has been vacant ever since.

Although the buildings have been vacant or underutilized since the brewery's closing in 1968, the towering structure and copper cupola atop the brew house has been an iconic part of the city's skyline for nearly a century, symbolizing Allentown's rich industrial history.

It was added to the National Register of Historic Places in 1980. The site is currently listed on Preservation Pennsylvania's "Pennsylvania at Risk" list.

== Neuweiler and the Neighborhood Improvement Zone ==
Neuweiler was recently zoned as part of the Waterfront Redevelopment district of the new Neighborhood Improvement Zone (NIZ) in Allentown. A New York Firm, Ruckus Marketing, purchased the brewery for $1.7 million in March 2014.

As of 2013, it has plans to redevelop the entire property, converting the majority into a new brewing facility. The remainder of the space will be converted to mixed use commercial office space. The new plans call for a $30 million renovation.

== See also ==
- List of historic places in Allentown, Pennsylvania
