= Gauff-Roth House =

Historic house in Pennsylvania, United States

- U.S. National Register of Historic Places
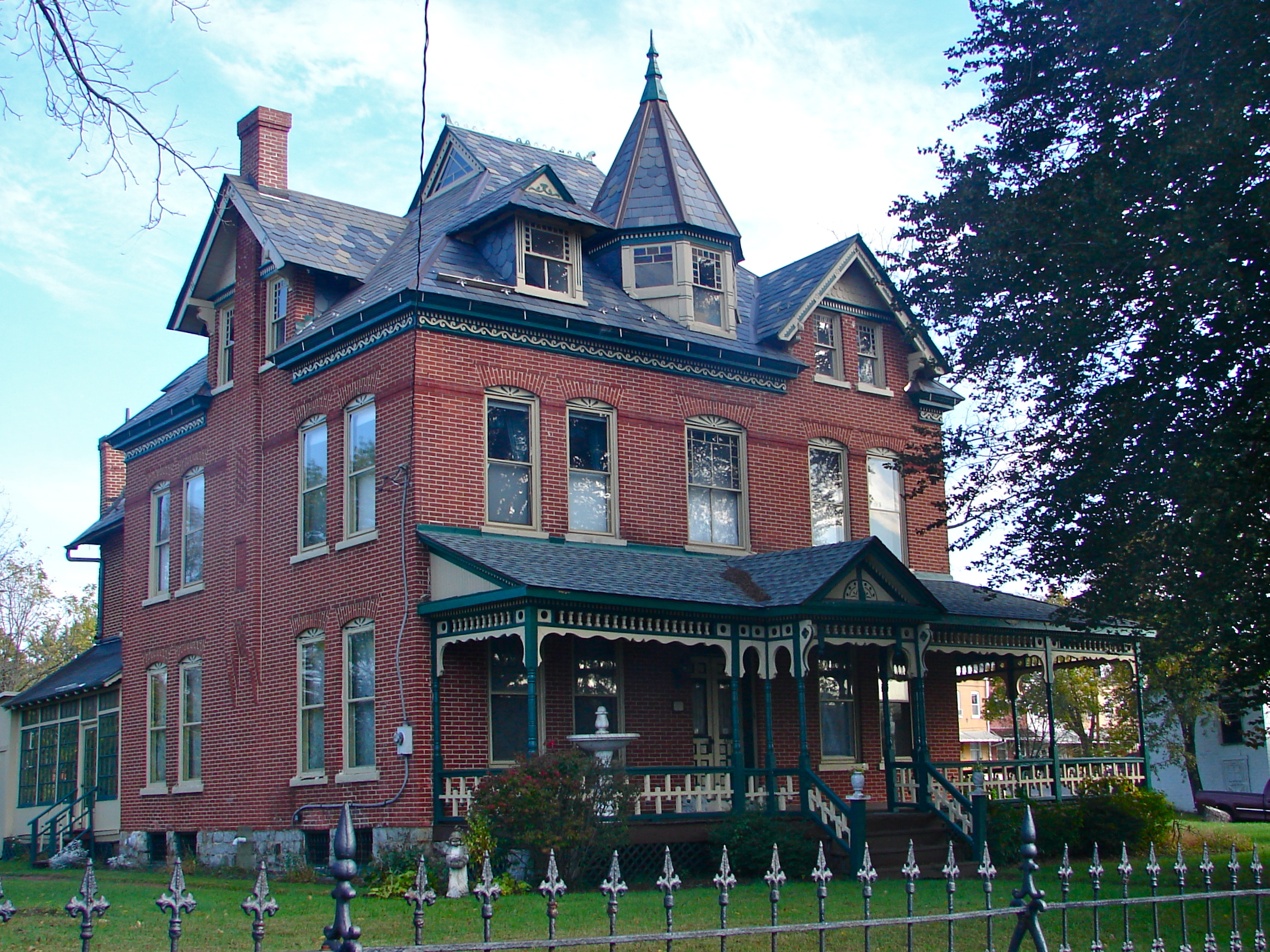
- Gauff-Roth House in Allentown, Pennsylvania, October 2011

- Location within Pennsylvania Location within the United States
- Location: 427-443 Auburn Street, Allentown, Pennsylvania
- Coordinates: 40°35′46″N 75°27′52″W
- Area: 0.7 acres (0.28 ha)
- Built: 1880
- Architect: Gangewere, William H.
- Architectural style: Queen Anne
- NRHP reference No.: 85001966
- Added to NRHP: September 5, 1985

Gauff-Roth House is a historic home located at 427 to 443 Auburn Street in Allentown, Pennsylvania. The house features a wraparound porch, third floor balcony, a polygonal turret, and a hipped roof with multiple gables and dormers.

== History ==
The house was built in 1880 for Mary Craig and Elizabeth Craig Gauff with money inherited from their grandfather. Mary met William Gangewere while the house was being constructed and married him. She lived only a short time in the home, or not at all, according to some historians.

The home is a two-and-one-half-story, irregular rectangular brick dwelling, which was designed in the Queen Anne style. It has sixty-six windows, two working chimneys and two interior non-functional chimneys. Inside the house, an oak staircase stretches three floors. The home's forty-three doors and extensive wood decoration have retained their original finish with few minor changes over the years.

Throughout its history, the home was occupied by the Gauff family in 1880, the Roths in 1930 and the Ziegler family in 1982.

It was added to the National Register of Historic Places in 1985. The home was completely renovated in the mid-1990s.

== See also ==
- List of historic places in Allentown, Pennsylvania
