= Allen Theater (Allentown, Pennsylvania) =

Former movie theater in Allentown, Pennsylvania

- Nedson Theater
- Interactive map of Allen Theater
- Address: 608-610 North New Street; Allentown, Pennsylvania; United States
- Coordinates: 40°36′33″N 075°28′51″W
- Type: Theater
- Current use: Parking lot

Construction
- Opened: 1915
- Closed: 1989
- Demolished: 2000
- Rebuilt: 1934

The Allen Theater is a former cinema in Allentown, Pennsylvania. It opened in 1915 and closed in 1989.

== History ==
The Allen Theater opened in August 1914 as the "Nedsen Theater", owned and operated by R. E. Bowen and H. E. Kelser. It was initially opened with a seating capacity of 416 seats. In June, 1915, it was taken over by James K. Bowen who owned the Pergola Theater at Ninth and Hamilton Street. Bowen expanded the theater to 700 seats and added a second projector. Bowen also added evening showings of films shown during the day at the Pergola. It was renovated in 1934, adding sound capability.

On October 12, 1934, The Morning Call in Allentown, Pennsylvania ran an article saying the renovated theatre, renamed the "New Allen Theater" would open the next day. Its new owners were Robert L. Plarr, owner of Dorney Park & Wildwater Kingdom amusement park, and John T. Dodd, who had been the park's general manager to that point for eight years. The first feature film shown in the newly renovated theater was Baby Take a Bow with child star Shirley Temple, James Dunn and Claire Trevor. In 1938, air conditioning was added.

Throughout its existence, the Allen was a local, second-run theater which, unlike its contemporaries in downtown Allentown, played popular films in a residential neighborhood after they ended their first run at the larger theaters in the entertainment district. Prices were considerably less: during the Depression of the 1930s, admission was 20 cents for adults and 10 cents for children.

The Allen was one of three "neighborhood" second-run theaters in the residential district of Allentown in the 1930s, the others being the Franklin Theater (1913) at 429 W. Tilghman Street and the Towne Theater (1935) at 343 N. Sixth Street; all were within a mile or two of each other. The Allen had a number of owners over the decades, and was moderately successful even during the age of television in the 1950s and 1960s. Primarily because of its low prices, it had a reputation as a place to go to see movies a little later but at a cheaper admission. As late as the 1980s, a film could be seen at the Allen for $1 admission. "Wait until it comes to the Allen," was its slogan.

Rising film rental costs and other overhead expenses, however, could not be ignored, and as time passed Allen did not draw the crowds it once did. The Allen Theater was built at a time when Allentown was a pedestrian city. Built in a neighborhood of row homes, there was little or no place for people to park their cars nearby, and in the age of mall multi-cinemas in the suburbs, the charm of a small-single screen theater showing second-run films built in a neighborhood that was in decline, and the 1987 death of the theater's last owner, George Restum, led to its closure in November 1989. The building stood vacant for just over a decade, with its fate tied up in a property dispute. It was demolished in 2000. Today, the land is used as an asphalt parking lot.

== See also ==
- List of historic places in Allentown, Pennsylvania
