= Adams Island (Pennsylvania) =

- Adams Island and the Lehigh Canal as photographed in 1910
- Interactive map of Adams Island

Geography
- Location: Lehigh River
- Coordinates: 40.6134°N 75.4532°W
- Area: 7 acres (2.8 ha)

Administration
- United States
- State: Pennsylvania
- County: Lehigh County
- City: Allentown, Pennsylvania

Demographics
- Population: 30 year-round residents (2021)

Adams Island is a man-made island in the Lehigh River in Allentown, Pennsylvania. It is located between Tilghman Street Bridge and Hamilton Street Bridge, and just upstream from the smaller Eves Island. Its previous names include Kletors or Claders Island and Haymakers Island. The island is inhabited by both summer and year-round residents. A ferry ran between the island and River Front Park for over 50 years, but has since been decommissioned. It is currently accessibly by both road and footbridge.

== History ==
=== 19th century ===
Originally a peninsula, the island was created in the 1820s by the Lehigh Coal and Navigation Company while building the Lehigh Canal. While the canal remained in full operation, some canal workers built homes on the island.

=== 20th century ===
1910 postcard showing Adams Island ferry and boathouses

In the early 20th century, the Lehigh Coal and Navigation Company sold the island to the newly formed Allentown Swimming and Boating Club, whose founders included Harry Clay Trexler and Max Hess. It was officially incorporated in 1907 and renamed Adams Island.

The Swimming and Boating Club established recreational facilities on the island and divided the remaining land into 100 parcels, on which new cottages and boathouses were later constructed. This made the island a popular summer vacation destination.

=== 21st century ===
Adams Island celebrated the 100th anniversary of its incorporation in August of 2007, at which point 44 families lived on the island either as full-time or summer residents.

As of 2021, 41 houses remained on the island, though they are threatened by water damage from flooding.
