= Hess =

Hess may refer to:

== People ==
- Hess (surname), a list of people with the surname Hess or Heß
- Rudolf Hess (1894–1987), Deputy Führer of the Nazi Party, 1933-1941
- Hess, nickname of Raymond Hesselyn (1921–1963), New Zealand Second World War fighter ace

== Businesses ==
- Hess Corporation, an American integrated oil and gasoline company
- Hess Educational Organization, the largest private provider of English instruction in the Republic of China
- Hess Oil and Chemical, an American oil company
- Hess Shoe Store, a defunct American chain of shoe stores
- Hess's, a defunct American department store chain
- Carrosserie Hess AG, a Swiss commercial vehicle manufacturer

== Sports ==
- Hess Cycling Team, a Luxembourgish women's road cycling team

== Places ==
- Hess, Oklahoma, an unincorporated community in the United States
- Hess Mountain, Alaska, United States
- Hess Lake, Michigan, United States
- Hess Mesa, Victoria Land, Antarctica
- Hess (crater), an impact crater on the far side of the Moon

== Other uses ==
- HESS, an experiment in gamma-ray astronomy
- Hess: A Biography, a 1971 biography of Rudolf Hess
- Hess Catalogue of compositions of Ludwig van Beethoven

== See also ==
- Hess v. Indiana, a United States Supreme Court case
- Hess House (disambiguation)
- The Hess Homestead, a historic Mennonite farmstead near Lititz, Pennsylvania, United States
- Hess Tower, an office building in Houston, Texas, United States
- Hess's law, a law in chemistry
- Hesse (disambiguation)
