= Hamilton Street =

Major thoroughfare in Allentown, Pennsylvania

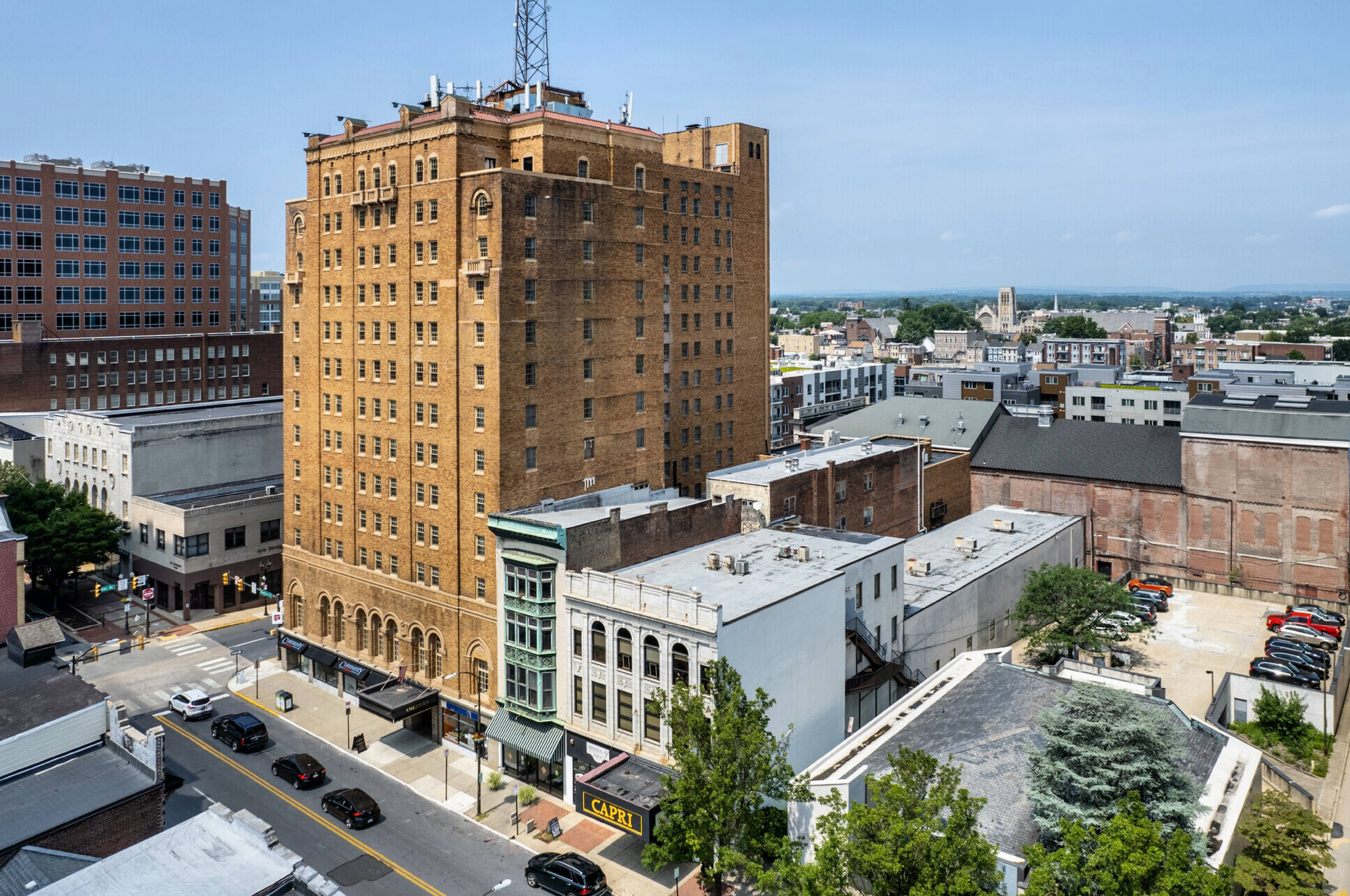
- The 500 block of Hamilton Street in 2021
- Interactive map of Hamilton Street
- Part of: Allentown, Pennsylvania, U.S.
- Coordinates: 40.601716804720525°N 75.47359499864886°W
- East end: Hanover Avenue
- Major junctions: PA 222
- West end: PA Route 222

Hamilton Street is a major thoroughfare and historic street in the Center City section of Allentown, Pennsylvania. The street dates back to 1762, when Allentown's founder, William Allen, included it as one of the first of several streets to be constructed in the city.

The street is named for James Hamilton, who served as the mayor of Philadelphia from 1745 to 1746 and two terms as deputy governor of the colonial-era Province of Pennsylvania from 1759 to 1763 and 1748 to 1754.

== Geography ==
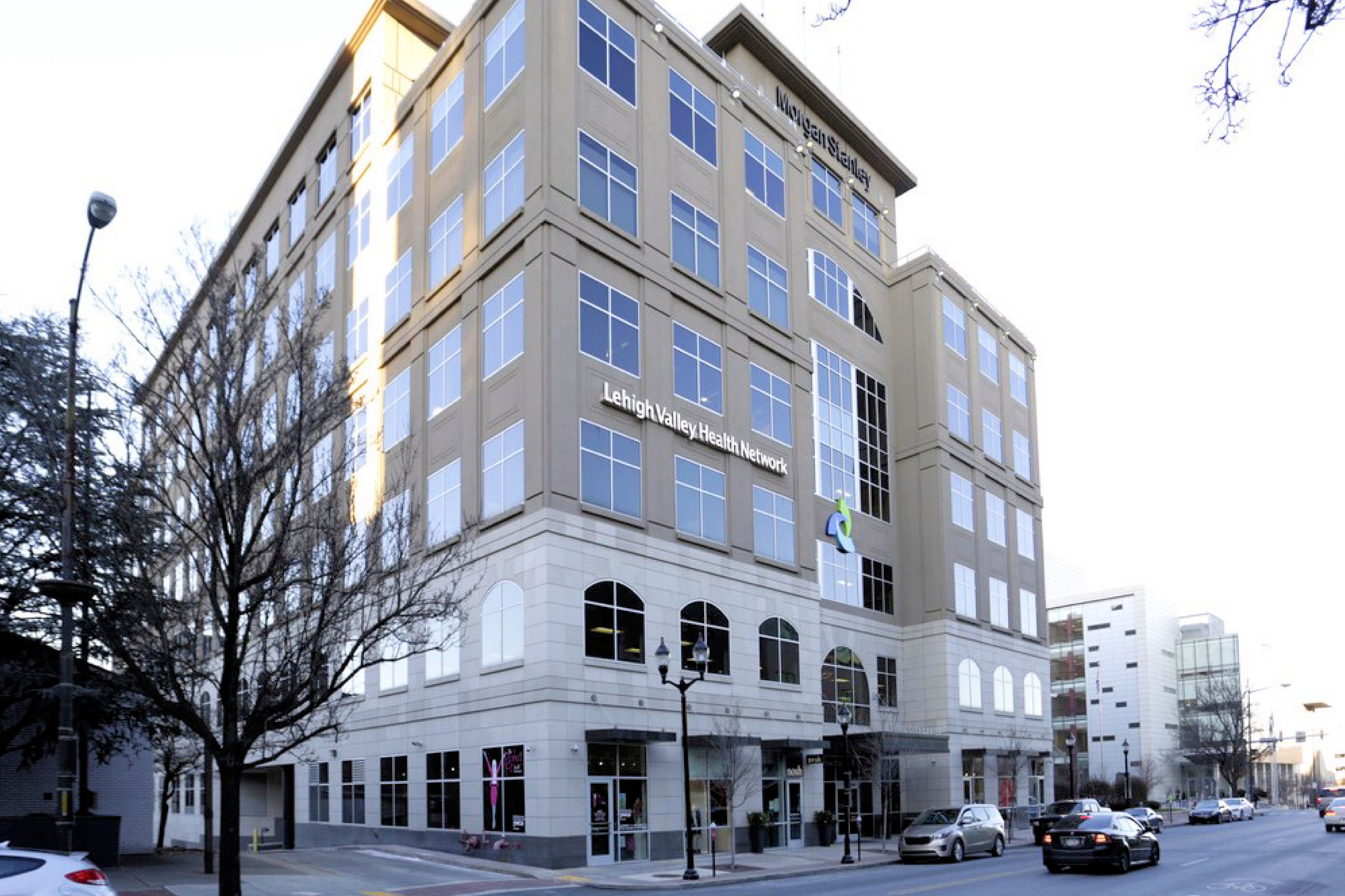
Three City Center at 515 West Hamilton Street

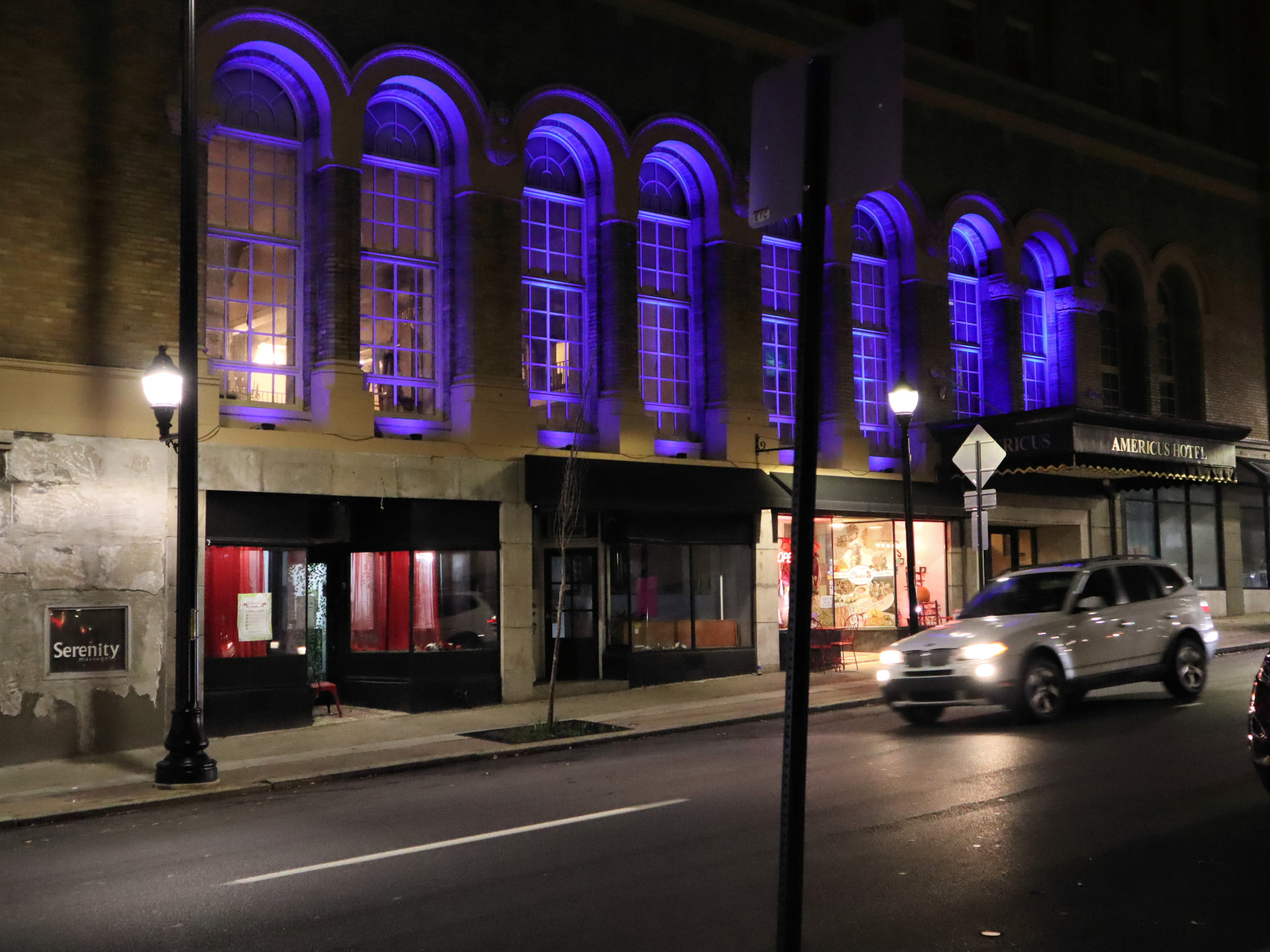
Americus Hotel, a historic Center City Allentown hotel, at 541 Hamilton Street

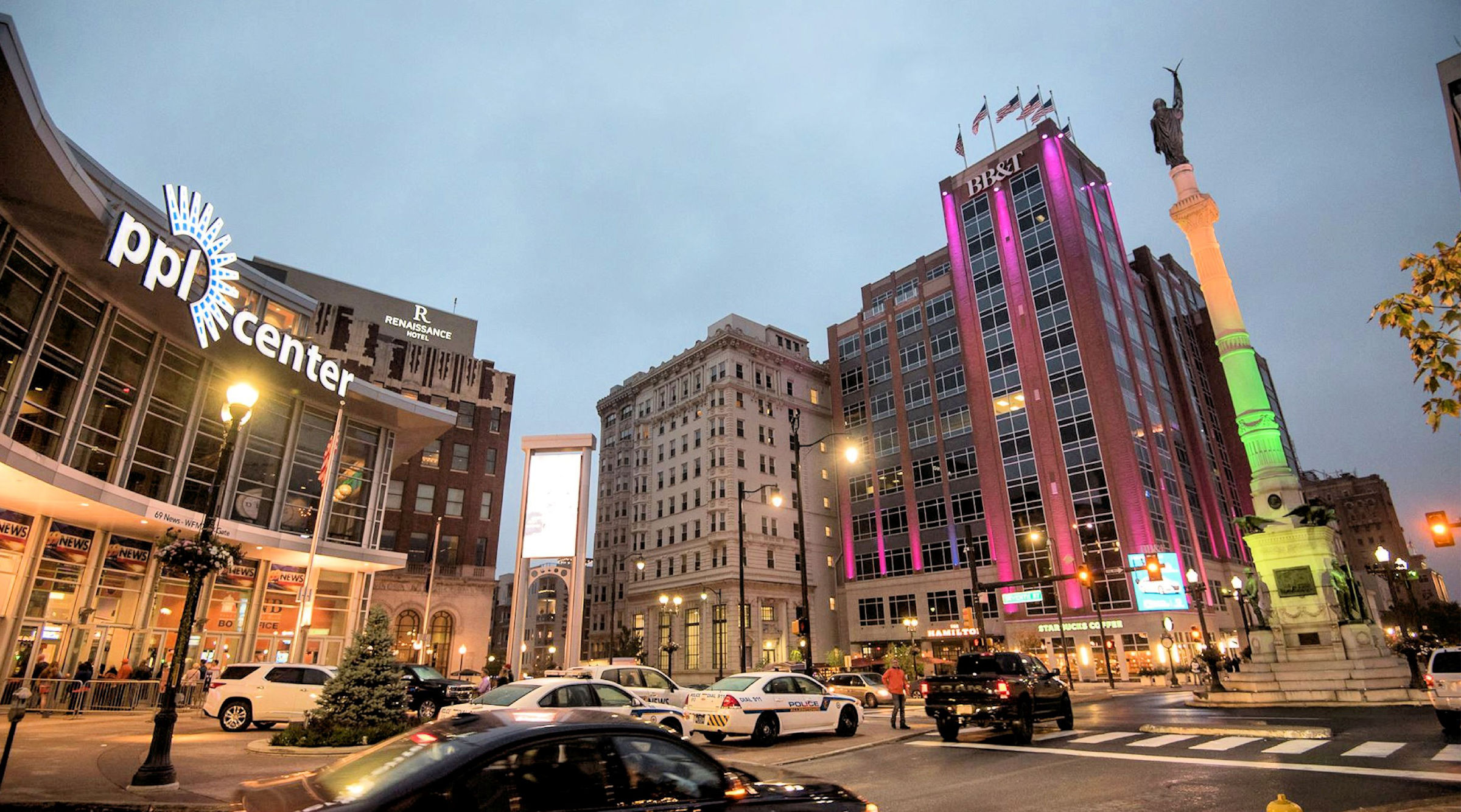
PPL Center at 701 Hamilton Street (on left) and the Soldiers and Sailors Monument, honoring Union Army and Spanish–American War veterans, at Center Square on Hamilton Street (on right)

Hamilton Street begins at the end of Hanover Avenue just east of the Lehigh River in Allentown's east-side, then crosses the Lehigh River, and proceeds through Center City Allentown, where it becomes PA Route 222 past 13th Street in Allentown's west-side.

== History ==
Hamilton Street was one of the first streets developed in the 18th century by William Allen, a shipping merchant and former mayor of Philadelphia. On September 10, 1735, Allen acquired 5,000-acre (20 km^{2}) that includes present-day Center City Allentown, from Joseph Turner, an iron manufacturer and also a former mayor of Philadelphia.

=== 20th century ===
In the 1970s, Hamilton Street was developed as the central shopping district in Allentown.

In the late 20th century, however, the subsequent development of indoor shopping malls in Allentown suburbs, including Lehigh Valley Mall in Fullerton, South Mall in Salisbury Township, and Whitehall Mall in Whitehall Township, drew customers away from Hamilton Street's shopping district, and many of its largest stores, including Hess's, Leh's, and others, were either acquired or went out of business.

=== 21st century ===
In September 2014, a major development project was completed on Hamilton Street, which included the construction and opening of PPL Center, an 8,500 indoor arena that serves as the home arena for the Lehigh Valley Phantoms, an American Hockey League team and the primary development hockey team for the Philadelphia Flyers. The arena also hosts major concerts, sports, and entertainment events throughout the year.

The City of Allentown holds its annual "Classics & Cruisers" event on Hamilton Street, which features classic cars from the 1970s and 1980s.

== Notable locations ==
- Allentown Public Library, the city's primary library, is located at 1210 Hamilton Street.
- Allentown station, a historic and decommissioned Central Railroad of New Jersey passenger train station, is located at 369 Hamilton Street.
- America on Wheels' administrative offices are located on the former grounds of Arbogast & Bastian, at 25 Hamilton Street.
- Americus Hotel, a historic 13-story hotel, built between 1926 and 1927, is located at 541 Hamilton Street.
- Farr Building, a historic retail and residential building built on the grounds of a former hospital for wounded Continental Army troops during the Revolutionary War, is located at 739 Hamilton Street.
- High German Evangelical Reformed Church, a historic church where the Liberty Bell was hidden for nine months from September 1777 to June 1778 during the British occupation of Philadelphia during the Revolutionary War, is located at 622 West Hamilton Street.
- Lehigh Valley Health Network maintains a sports medicine and gymnasium facility at One City Center at 707 Hamilton Street.
- Old Lehigh County Courthouse, a historic courthouse built between 1814 and 1819 and named to the National Register of Historic Places in 1981, is located at 503 West Hamilton Street.
- PPL Building, a 24-story headquarters of PPL Corporation, is the tallest building in Allentown and the greater Lehigh Valley metropolitan area at 98.02 m (321.6 ft) in height, i located at 2 N. 9th Street, at the corner of 9th and Hamilton Streets.
- PPL Center, an 8,500 capacity indoor sports and entertainment arena and the home arena of the Lehigh Valley Phantoms of the American Hockey League, the primary development team of the National Hockey League's Philadelphia Flyers, is located at 701 Hamilton Street.
- Trout Hall, a Georgian-style home, one of Allentown's oldest still-standing structures, built between 1768 and 1770, is the current location of the Lehigh County Historical Society's library and museum.
- Zollinger-Harned Company Building, a historic department store, built in 1925 and 1926, and named to the National Register of Historic Places in 1979, is located at 605-613 West Hamilton Street.
