= Hesse (disambiguation) =

Hesse is both a cultural region of Germany and the name of an individual German state.

Hesse may also refer to:

- Hesse (surname)
- Greater Hesse, a German territory created by the US military administration at the end of World War II (1945–46)
- Landgraviate of Hesse (1264–1567)
  - Lower Hesse
  - Upper Hesse
- Grand Duchy of Hesse (1806–1918)
- People's State of Hesse (1918–45)
- Hesse, Moselle, a place in Lorraine, France
- Landgraviate of Hesse-Darmstadt (1567–1806)
- Hesse District, Upper Canada or Western District
- Landgraviate of Hesse-Kassel (1567–1803)
- Electorate of Hesse (1803–1807, 1814–1866)
- Province of Kurhessen
- Hesse (Blakes, Virginia), a historic plantation house
- Hesse, Victoria, Australia
- Hesse: The Wanderer and His Shadow, a 2012 biography by Gunnar Decker

== Sports ==
- KSV Hessen Kassel, an association football club from Kassel, Hesse
- SC Hessen Dreieich, an association football club from Dreieich, Hesse

== See also ==
- History of Hesse
- List of rulers of Hesse
- Carlingue or Active Group Hesse
- Hesse's Rule in zoology
- Hesse configuration
- Hese
- Hess (disambiguation)
- Hessen (disambiguation)
