= Hessen (disambiguation) =

Hessen may refer to:

- Hesse, a cultural region of Germany and a German state (land)
  - an adjective thereof, see Hesse (disambiguation)
- Hessen (Osterwieck), also Hessen am Fallstein, a village in the Harz district of Saxony-Anhalt, Germany
- Hessen (ship), several naval ships of Germany
- Boris Hessen, Soviet physicist
- Dag Olav Hessen, Norwegian biologist
- Robert Hessen, American historian
- Tonje Hessen Schei, Norwegian film producer

== See also ==
- Heessen (disambiguation), a German toponym
- Heesen, Dutch surname
