= Farr Building =

Historical building in Pennsylvania

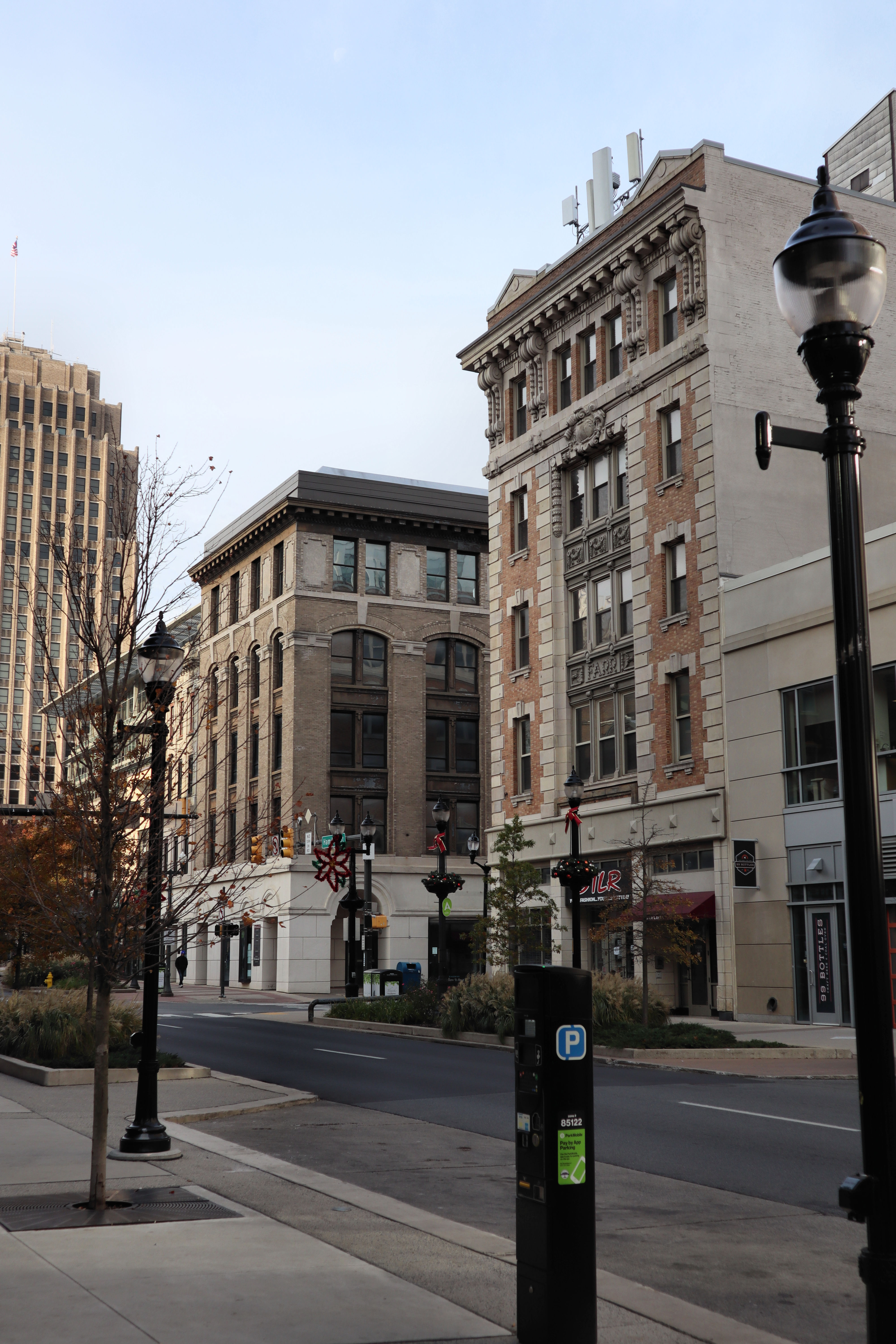
- The Farr Building at 739 Hamilton Street in Allentown, Pennsylvania in 2021
- Interactive map of the Farr Building area

General information
- Status: Mixed use residential/commercial
- Architectural style: Classic Revival
- Location: United States, 739 Hamilton Street, Allentown, Pennsylvania, U.S.
- Coordinates: 40°36′07″N 075°28′25″W
- Construction started: 1906
- Completed: 1907
- Renovated: 1932, 1965, 2004
- Owner: Metropolis Management LLC

The Farr Building is a historic office building in Allentown, Pennsylvania. The building, which opened in 1907, is currently used as retail and residential space.

== History ==
=== 18th century ===
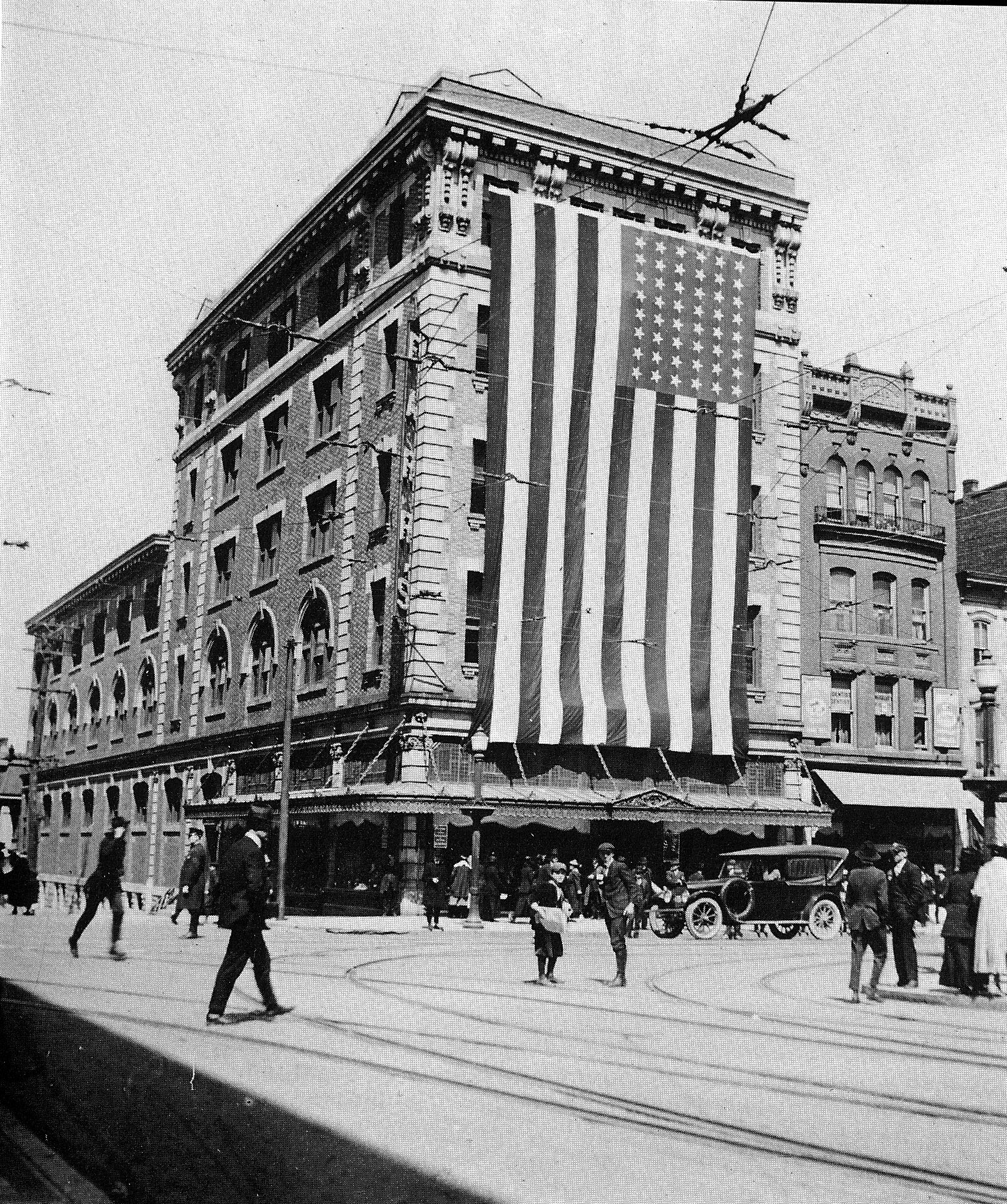
The Farr Building in Center City Allentown during World War I in 1918

Prior to the Farr Building's construction, the site on which it was built was used as a hospital facility by the Continental Army, which used the facility to treat wounded Continental Army troops during the American Revolutionary War.

=== 19th century ===
In June 1862, during the American Civil War, Jacob Farr Sr. opened a shoe business in the same location. Farr learned the shoe trade in Philadelphia a decade earlier, in 1852, when he was 14 years old. He operated the business at the site during the American Industrial Revolution throughout the late 19th century, and bequeathed the business to his family upon his death in April 1889 at age 51.

Following Farr's death, the family recruited a business partner, Nathan Hass, which prompted the business to be renamed Farr, Hass & Company.

In 1898, the business expanded to large-scale manufacturing of shoes, operating as the Lehigh Valley Shoe Company with its manufacturing building located at Chestnut and Howard streets in Center City Allentown. Farr manufactured 1,000 shoes a day, which he sold from the present-day Farr Building location at 8th and Hamilton streets. Describing the business, the owners said, "there is nothing in the line of ladies' men's and children's shoes that cannot be supplied to their large trade from their establishment."

=== 20th century ===
In 1900, Hass left the Farr Company, and the Farr family recruited Edgar Wenner to replace him. The company was subsequently renamed Farr Brothers' and Co., and the pace of its growth stretched the capacity of its existing building, leading the company to developed the Farr Building, a new, larger, five-story building, on the same site.

Construction on the new building began in 1906 and was completed the following year, in 1907. The new building was built by Harvey H. and Jacob L. Farr Jr., sons of Jacob Farr Sr., and designed by Rhue & Lange, an Allentown-based firm.

The new building opened on the site in 1907. The Farr Company's retail store was located on the building's first floor. The basement served as the company's stockroom. The company's offices were on the fifth floor, and the company leased the second, third, and fourth floors to various Allentown businesses.

The company continued to expand in the early 20th century, opening stores in Easton in 1910, in Reading in 1913, in Bethlehem in 1919, and in the state capital of Harrisburg in 1953. The company's slogan was "Better Shoes By Farr".

In 1925, a historical plaque was placed on the side of the Farr Building by the Citizens of Allentown and the Liberty Bell Chapter of Daughters of the American Revolution, honoring the history of the building and the many Allentown-area soldiers who fought with the Continental Army during the American Revolutionary War. The plaque states:

"On this site was located one of four hospitals for soldiers of the Continental Army."

In 1932 and again in 1965, the Farr Building was remodeled, and the company continued to experience significant growth until the 1970s when Center City Allentown's shopping district on Hamilton Street was challenged by a significant flight of Allentown residents for the city's suburbs, which led to the development of the Lehigh Valley Mall in South Whitehall Township and other indoor malls in suburban Allentown. The new malls presented immense competitive pressure on the retail and other businesses that were still operating in the center city.

In December 1985, the company announced that it was ending full retail service at its flagship store at 8th and Hamilton streets, that the store would become a self-service store, and that the company was being sold to a New York City firm, leading the Farr family to leave the shoe business.

In 1988, after the Farr Building was acquired by a commercial retail speculator, one Farr family member, Harvey Farr, reacquired the property when the property speculator placed it up for sale.

Four years later, in August 1992, Farr sold the property to D.E. Jones Company, a discount merchandise company. By this time, there was no rental market for the building's upper four floors, which were vacant.

=== 21st century ===
In 2004, the building was sold to Metropolis Management LLC, a New York City-based development firm with a history of preserving historic structures, which renovated and retrofitted the building into luxury loft-style apartments.

On December 1, 2005, the Farr Lofts were opened on the historical location with a public showing of a finished two bedroom model unit, and an additional 19 units were leased in early 2006. The ground floor is used as "The Villa" urban clothing store.

In 2011, in preparation for the construction of the PPL Center, a 10,000-seat capacity indoor sports and entertainment arena in Center City Allentown, demolition began on the north side of Hamilton Street between 7th and 8th streets but exempted two buildings, The Farr Building and Dime Savings and Trust Company, which remained. It was noted at the time that, "... Because of the improvements that have been made, it is probably the most valuable property on the block".

The following year, in 2012, as work progressed on the PPL Center, workers discovered that the Farr Building's east wall required additional shoring, and the wall was strengthened by a structural engineering team brought in to ensure the building's ongoing structural stability.

== See also ==
- List of historic places in Allentown, Pennsylvania
