= Heessen =

Heessen may refer to:

- Heessen, a quarter of Hamm, North Rhine-Westphalia, Germany
- Heeßen, a municipality in the district of Schaumburg, in Lower Saxony, Germany

== See also ==
- Hessen (disambiguation)
