= Hess's =

Defunct American department store chain

Hess's Department Stores
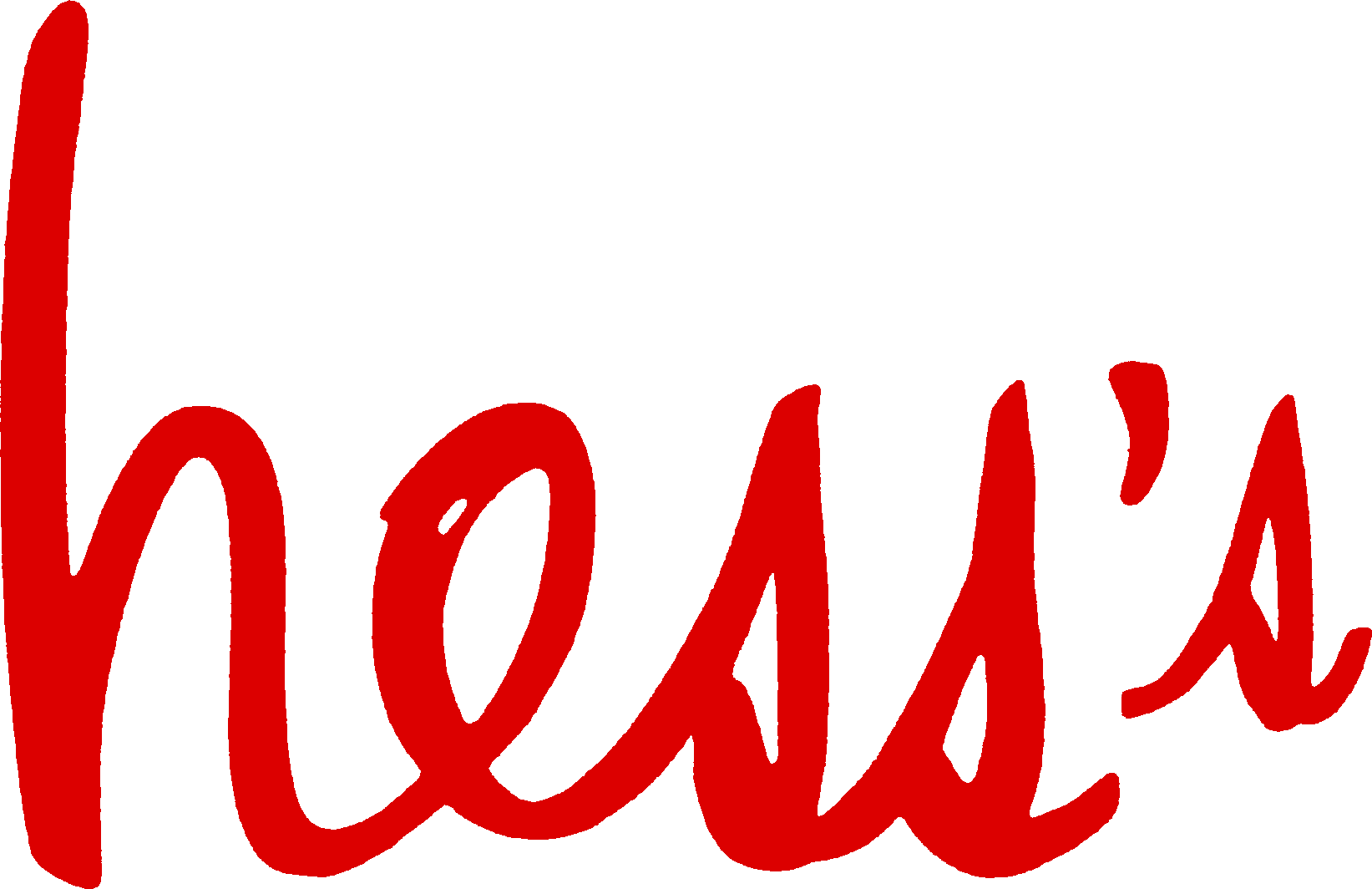
- Trade name: Hess's
- Type: Private
- Industry: Department stores
- Founded: February 19, 1897; 129 years ago (as Hess Brothers)
- Founders: Charles Hess and Max Hess
- Defunct: November 23, 1994; 31 years ago
- Fate: Converted to other department stores
- Successor: Dillard's (1993–present); Hecht's (1993–2006); Proffitt's (1993–2006); Kaufmann's (1994–2006); The Bon-Ton (1994–2018)
- Headquarters: Allentown, Pennsylvania, U.S.
- Products: Clothing, footwear, bedding, furniture, jewelry, beauty products, electronics and housewares
- Parent: Crown American Realty Trust

Hess's, originally known as Hess Brothers, was a department store chain based in Allentown, Pennsylvania. The company was founded as a single store in 1897, and grew to nearly 80 stores by its commercial peak in the late 1980s. The chains stores were closed or sold off in a series of deals in the early to mid-1990s.

== History ==
=== 19th century ===
In the summer of 1896, Max Hess Sr., a German-Jewish immigrant from Perth Amboy, New Jersey, visited Allentown, and returned to Perth Amboy, advising his brother Charles that Allentown was a major business opportunity for the company.

Hess Brothers was founded on February 19, 1897, by Charles and Max Hess. The brothers moved to Allentown that year, and leased space in what was then the Grand Central Hotel at 3rd and Hamilton streets.

Hess's first store opened at 9th and Hamilton streets in Center City Allentown. In the store's French Room, Charles Hess filled the store with fashions primarily from France. Hess made frequent trips to Paris, and wrote in an Allentown newspaper about what fashionable women were wearing for social engagements or to the Paris Opera.

On February 19, 1897, the Allentown Band was playing in front of the new Hess Brothers store to entertain the shoppers. Hess bought a significant amount of advertising space in the local Allentown newspapers to market the store.

Hess Brothers' dry goods business became increasingly popular and in 1901, and Hess expanded the store, taking over the entire Grand Central Hotel.

=== 20th century ===
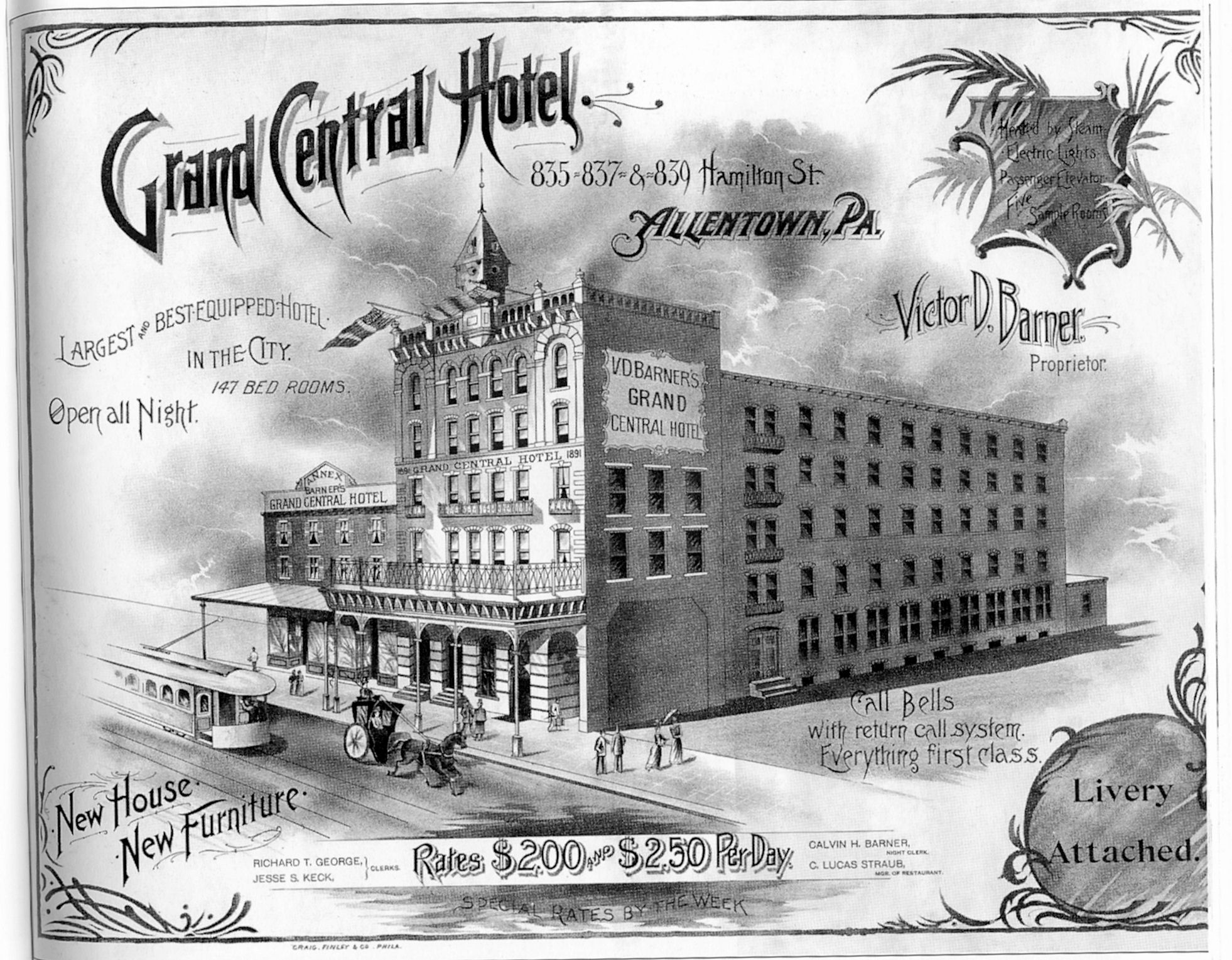
A 1900 advertisement for the Grand Central Hotel in Allentown

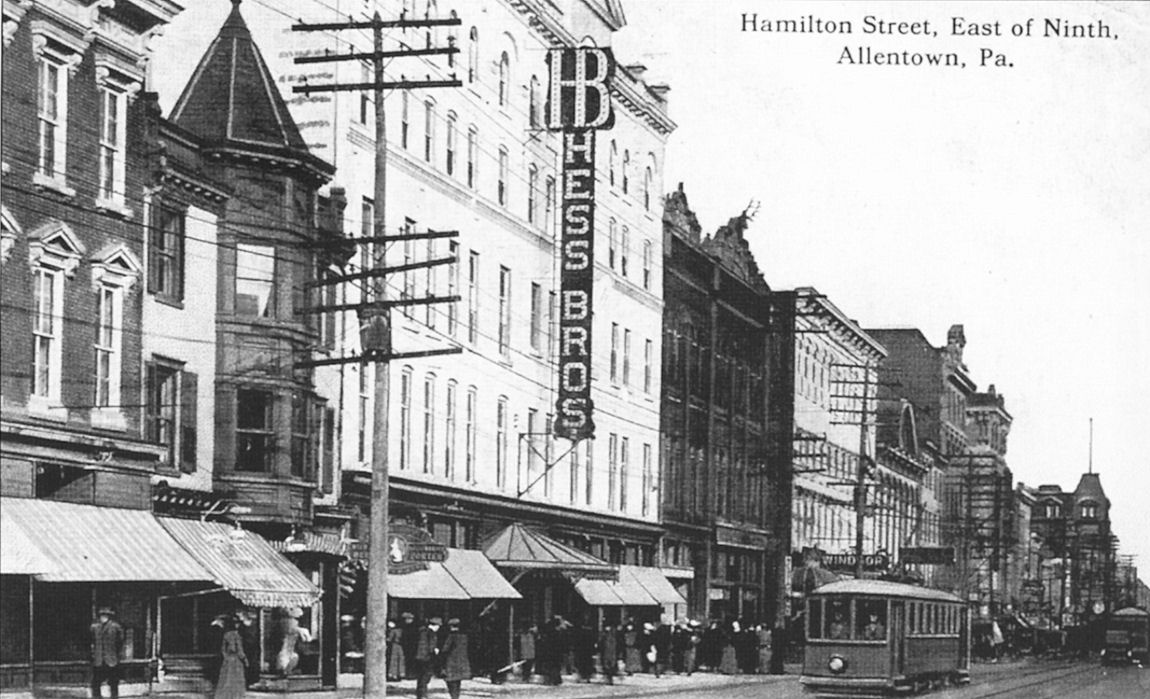
Hess Brothers store on the 800 block of Hamilton Street in Center City Allentown in 1915

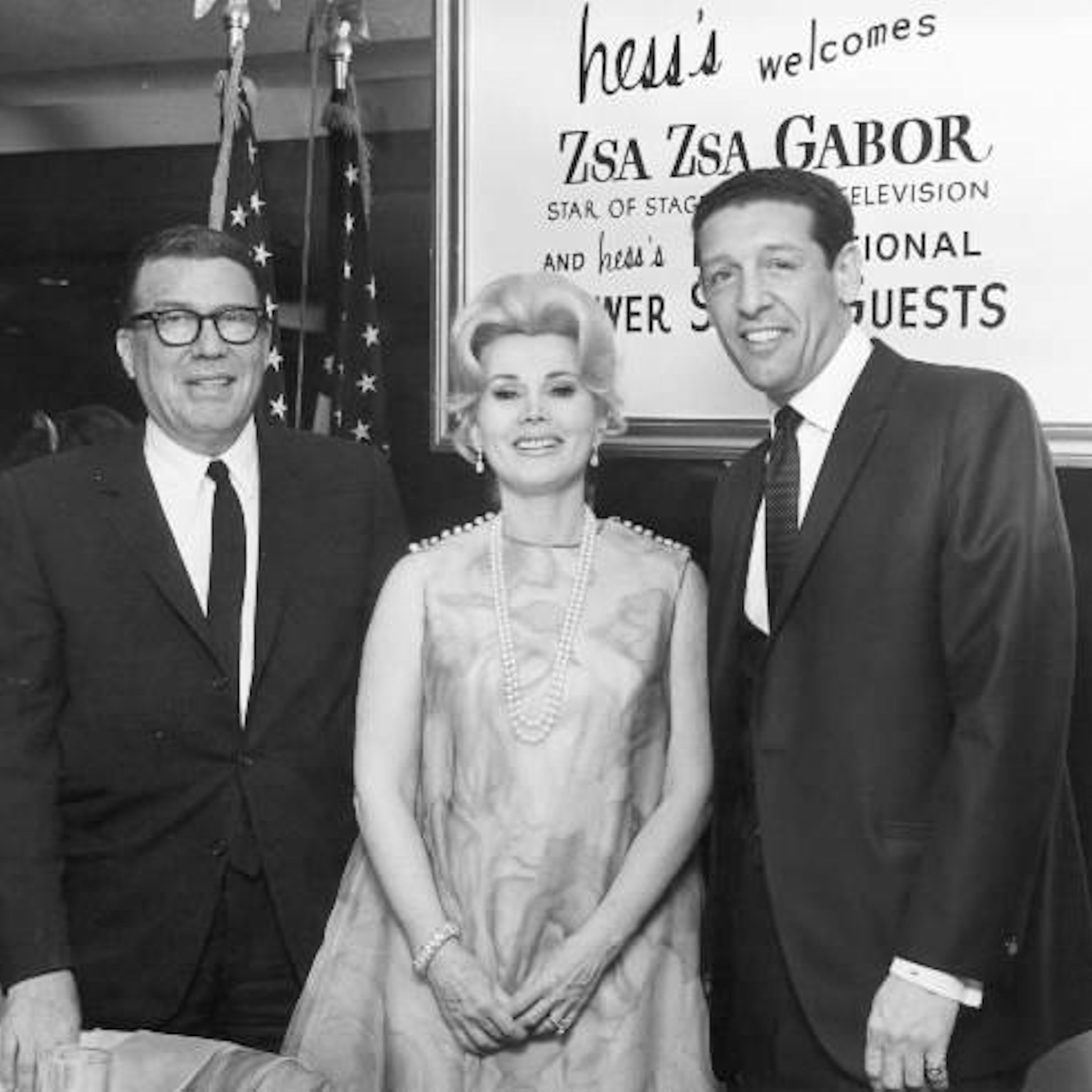
Zsa Zsa Gabor's promotional visit with the Hess Brothers and Hess's Center City Allentown store in 1968

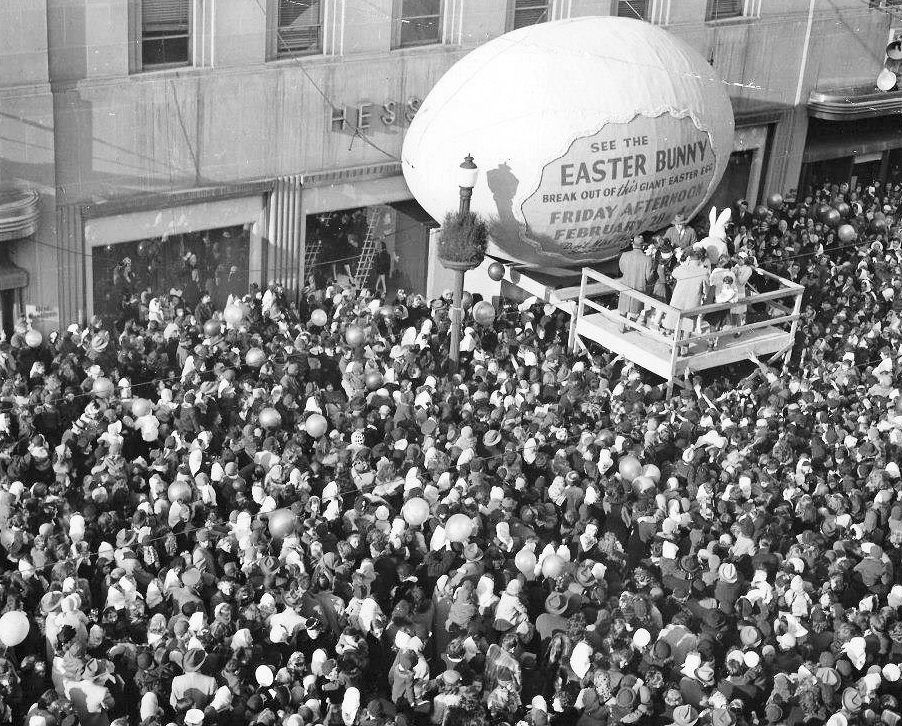
The arrival of the Easter Bunny at Hess's in 1968

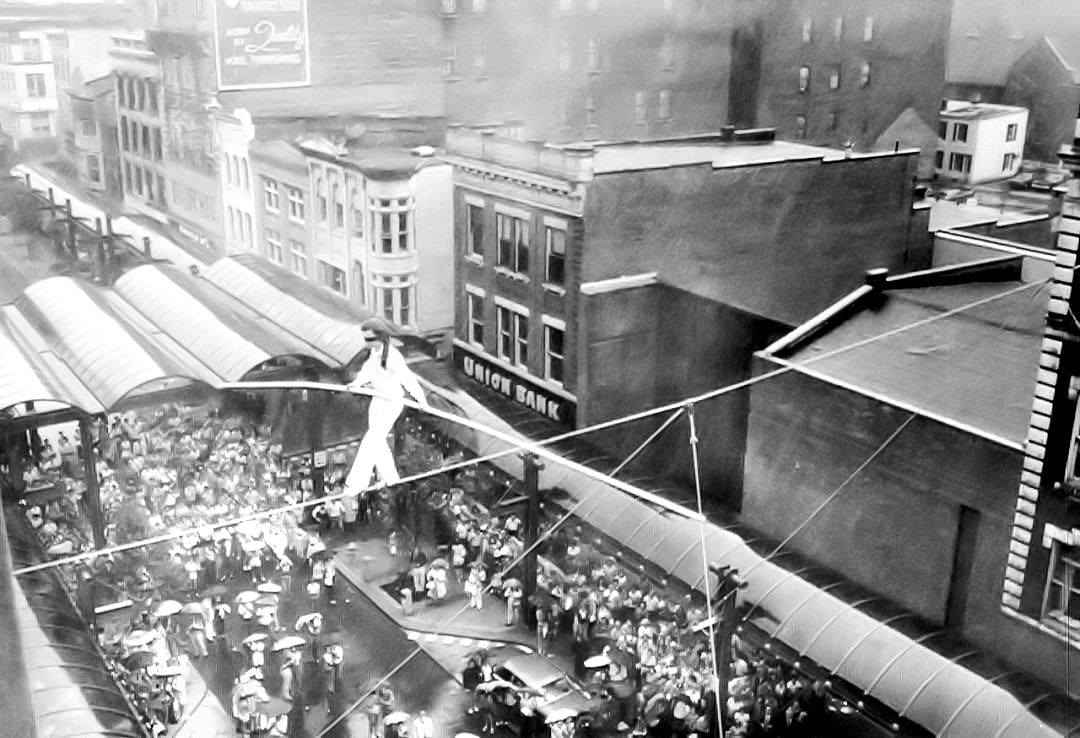
French high-wire artist Philippe Petit crosses Hamilton Street on a tightrope in a 1974 Hess's promotion

The shuttered Bon-Ton/Hess's store in 1996

On March 6, 1913, as Hess's continued to grow, neighboring properties were acquired so the store could be expanded again. A soda fountain and restaurant that seated 400 patrons was opened in the store. By 1915, the store had expanded to nearly a city block, maintaining a major Center City Allentown presence at the northeast corner of 9th and Hamilton streets.

In 1922, Max Sr. died at the age of 58. For the next several years, the store was run by his brother Charles.

In 1927, an eight-story annex was added to 9th and Hamilton store that included new departments and a new shipping and delivery area.

In 1929, Charles Hess died, as Max Hess, Jr. was beginning studies at Muhlenberg College in Allentown. On his 21st birthday, Max left Muhlenberg to join the family business as part of the management team. Three years later, he was appointed president.

While the exterior of the store still appeared as separate buildings, the inside was renovated to look as one large building. Displays such as large crystal chandeliers enabled the Hess brothers to succeed at making their store look like a "big city department store."

In 1939, they began renovations of the outside of the store.

In 1947, the store's façade was updated in Art Deco style, which was an emerging architectural style in the New York metropolitan area. The store eventually expanded to five floors and over 400,000 square feet (37,000 m^{2}) of retail space. It was the first store in the world to have automatic talking elevators, notifying its passengers what items were available on each floor.

One of the landmarks of Allentown was the large Hess Brothers sign on the store's corner at 9th and Hamilton Street. The 45-foot-tall (14 m) sign was the biggest of its type outside New York City, weighing eight tons. Its letters, made of porcelain enamel, were each seven feet (2.1 m) high. The sign was built to resist wind pressure of forty pounds per square foot (200 kg/m^{2}). The sign was three-sided to make it visible to both eastbound and westbound traffic. The 378 circuits were operated by a clock inside the sign that had eight light cycles timed to spell the name H E S S one letter at a time. The sign was turned on for the first time on December 23, 1947.

In his 1953 book, America’s Twelve Master Salesmen, B. C. Forbes listed Hess as the nation's second master salesman. Celebrities were brought in on a regular basis to attract customers and enhance the image of the store. As people dined in the restaurants, models would walk the floor wearing the latest fashions. The restaurant lost close to $20,000 a year, but it was a success in achieving its primary purpose of retaining customers with the store.

Hess also cultivated strong relations with store employees, inviting them to regular company barbecues at his country house on Bausch Road in Lowhill Township, outside Allentown, until World War II made travel too difficult for his workers.

With offices in London, Paris, and Rome, Hess Brothers Department Store was always at the forefront in selling the latest fashions. Giant toy soldiers were used as Christmas decorations, and "Pip the Mouse" appeared in a puppet show at the flagship store. The store hosted an annual flower show in May, which was aired regionally on Philadelphia television, and annual imported fashions and toy shows.

Hess invited celebrities to visit the store. Johnny Carson, Rosalynn Carter, Zsa Zsa Gabor, Rock Hudson, Gina Lollobrigida, Barbara Walters, Burt Ward, and others made appearances at Hess's primary 9th and Hamilton store in Allentown.

In 1968, Hess contacted Philip Berman, who operated a local trucking business for many years with his brother, and offered to sell the store. Berman acquired Hess for $16 million. Several months later, Hess died at the age of 57. Under Berman, the store name was changed from Hess Brothers to Hess's. Berman also brought in Max Rosey, a New York City and Broadway press agent, to promote the store, and they invited celebrities and notable national politicians to visit the store and promote Hess's nationally.

In 1974, among Hess's retail firsts, the store held an over-the-counter sale of pure gold when bullion sale was legalized, and introduced the Rudi Gernreich topless bathing suit. Hess's was one of only a handful of stores in the entire country to carry the suits, but failed to sell even one. Biannual sales events at Hess's were sometimes semi-disastrous events as shoppers, who often waited outside for the store to open in the morning, proceeded to trample each other and store employees to get to purchase discounted merchandise, leaving the shelves and racks completely stripped bare afterwards.

Berman began expanding Hess's, opening new stores in suburban Pennsylvania shopping malls, including the new Whitehall Mall in Whitehall Township, an Allentown suburb, which included Sears and Zollinger and Harned department stores. Berman wanted Hess's to be part of the wave of mall construction during the 1970s, and to be anchor stores in them. Additional stores were established in Lancaster and Easton in 1971, in Bethlehem in 1973, two in suburban Allentown shopping centers in 1974, and others in eastern and central Pennsylvania by 1979.

In October 1979, Crown American, a developer and owner of hotels and shopping malls, purchased the Hess's chain, which then included 17 large stores, as a wholly owned subsidiary. Under Crown American's leadership, Hess's enjoyed the booming retail market of the 1980s.

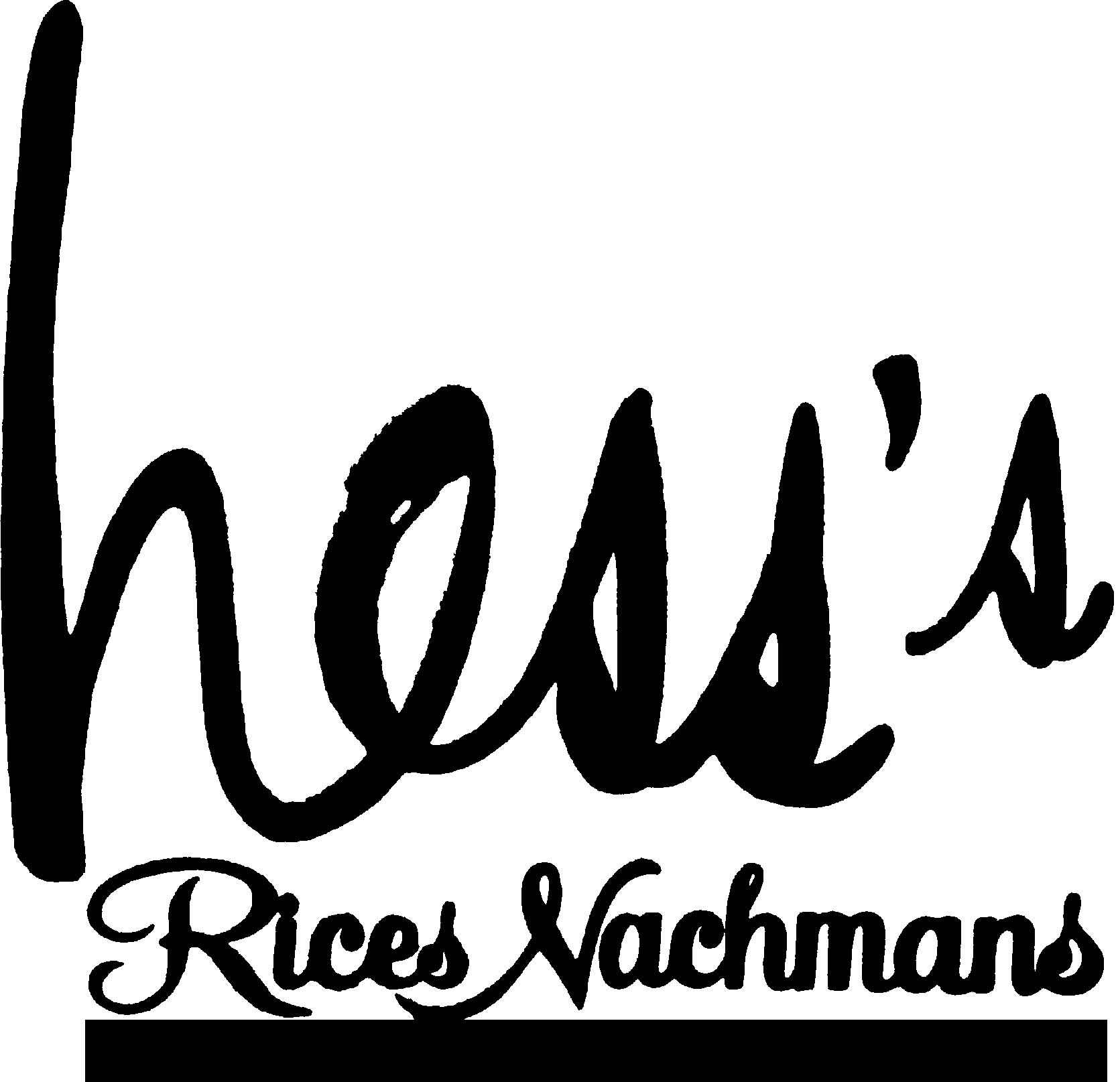
Hess's-Rices Nachmans transition logo

In 1982, Hess's purchased department store chains and converted them to the Hess's nameplate, including Penn Traffic, based in Johnstown, Pennsylvania. In 1985, it opened new Hess's stores in State College, Johnstown, and acquired Rices Nachmans in Virginia Beach.

In 1987, Hess's acquired the Knoxville, Tennessee-based Miller's Department Store chain from Allied Stores by hostile takeover.

In September 1987, Hess's agreed to acquire Snyder's, Inc., a privately held Louisville, Kentucky-based department store, and five L. S. Ayres stores in Kentucky that Snyder's had agreed to buy L. S. Ayres acquired them from Stewart Dry Goods and Pogue's a few years earlier. This new division operated briefuly under the Snyder's name. In November 1987, Hess's announced that it would phase out the Millers and Snyder's names in favor of its own moniker in February 1988.

By 1990, Hess's had expanded to 76 stores. A number of cost-cutting measures were made following the transfer of the chain to Crown American, including abandoning most of Hess's flower and fashion shows and celebrity appearances. The store's outside windows in the main Allentown store were covered up after their annual holiday window decoration displays were ended, along with the regular store window dressing displays of merchandise.

In the early 1990s, Hess's suffered as retail competition increased and the Allentown region was impacted by a national recession. The company responded by selling or shuttering 43 of its stores, especially those in the South, including the Knoxville stores, which they sold to Dillard's, and 18 other stores that they sold to Proffitt's in two transactions in 1992 and 1993.

In 1994, the company's remaining 30 stores were sold off, including the main Hamilton Street store in Allentown in 1994, ending the Hess's 97-year enterprise. May Department Stores purchased 10 locations, and The Bon-Ton purchased 20 others.

In 1995, Crown American sold the flagship 9th and Hamilton store in Center City Allentown to Bon-Ton Stores, Inc, a regional department company based in York, Pennsylvania. However, Allentown had been in economic decline since the 1970s, and the store's operations proved unprofitable.

On November 9, 1995, Bon-Ton Stores announced that the 9th and Hamilton store would be closed, and, on January 15, 1996, the store was closed permanently.

With the closure of the store, Bon-Ton placed the property for sale, and received inquiries from Mark Mendleson, who had a poor reputation with property management in the city. He was involved in a series of disputes with the City of Allentown with regards to non-payment of taxes, and the properties he owned being permitted to deterioriate to states of disrepair. There also was fear by the city that the property would be left vacant until property values improved, or would be used for a large flea market, tattoo parlors, or adult movie theaters.

Allentown Mayor William L. Heydt began a campaign for the city to purchase the property and redevelop the building. In October 1998, the city purchased the store from Bon-Ton, Inc. for $1.8 million (the equivalent of ~$3.22 million in 2024.) In addition to the department store building, the adjacent H.L. Green property, which had operated for decades as part of the McCrory Stores five and ten store chain and had closed, was acquired by the city. With the purchase by the city, however, a survey of the property revealed that the 9th and Hamilton Street building was in relatively poor condition and considered unsuitable for any other use. The site was considered not worth preserving, and plans were made for its demolition.

The seven-story parking deck at 814 Linden Street and the employee parking deck at 826 Turner Street, built in 1970, were retained and transferred to the Allentown Parking Authority. A considerable remediation effort began to rid the old building of hazardous materials.

=== 21st century ===
The remains of the former Hess Brothers Department Store after being razed in October 2000

In January 2000, the Pennsylvania Department of Environmental Protection authorized the Hess's building for demolition. The demolition was completed by October 2000 and the site was graded with gravel, and a fence erected.

During this time, a series of redevelopment options, including the building of PPL Center, a 10,000 capacity indoor arena that hosts the Lehigh Valley Phantoms and various entertainment events and concerts, was reviewed by the city. The former Hess's property was sold to PPL Corporation, which expanded its office complex onto the site with the plaza at PPL Center, a new office building that opened in July 2003 at the former Hess's flagship store site. The building includes one floor of leased office space, and the plaza level of the building includes retail storefronts.

== In popular culture ==
James A. Michener mentions Hess's flagship store in Allentown his The Novel, published in 1991, in which Hess's serves as the location where a fictional author sells his novels' first printings.

== See also ==
- H. Leh and Company
- List of historic places in Allentown, Pennsylvania
- Zollinger and Harned
