= Leh's =

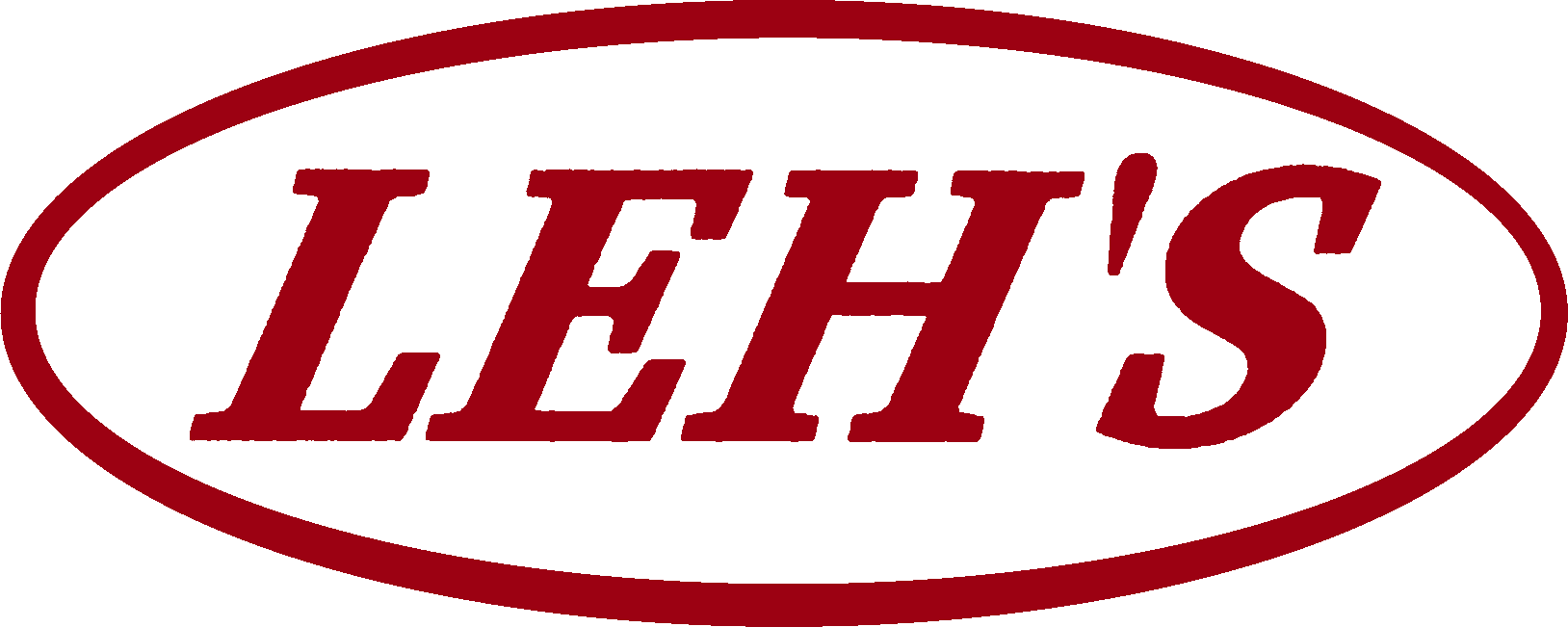

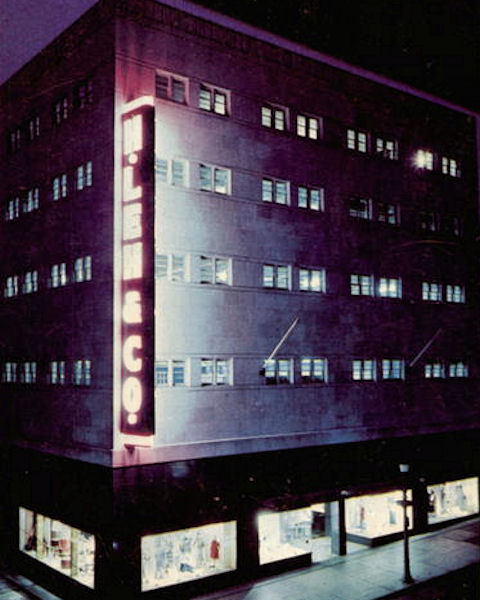
- H. Leh & Company building in Allentown, Pennsylvania, c. 1950s
- Company type: Department stores
- Industry: Retail
- Founded: 1850
- Defunct: 1996
- Fate: Bankruptcy
- Headquarters: 626 Hamilton Street, Allentown, Pennsylvania, U.S.
- Products: Clothing, footwear, cosmetics, jewelry, beauty products, electronics, and appliances

H. Leh & Co., typically referred to simply as Leh's, was a department store located at 626 West Hamilton Street in Allentown, Pennsylvania. It was part of what was an outside mall structure called the Hamilton Mall in the Center City portion of the city. Like many other downtown department stores of the time, however, it ultimately closed as suburban shopping malls gained market share at the expense of inner-city stores.

== History ==
=== 19th century ===
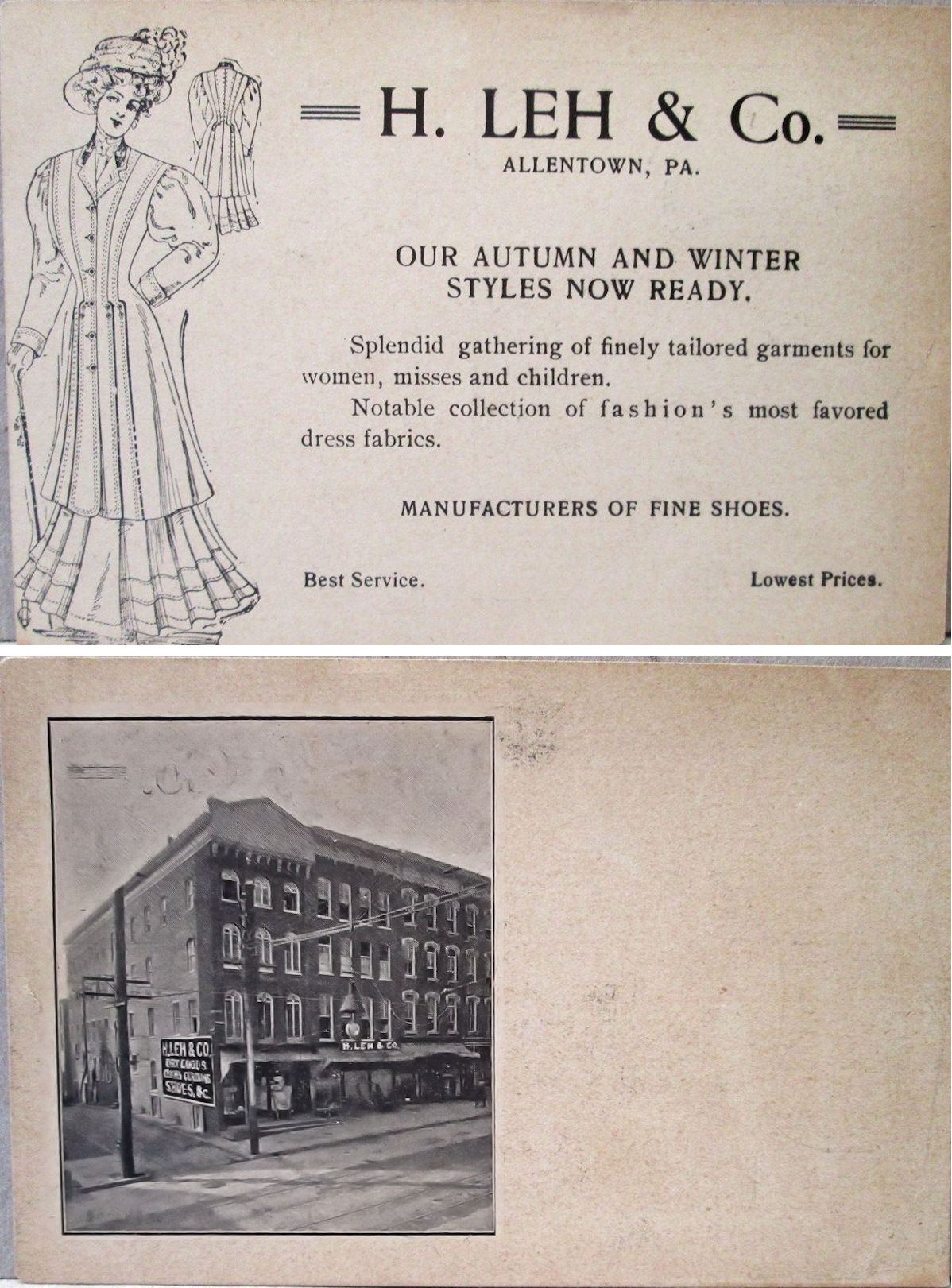
The original building at 626 Hamilton Street in Allentown and its additions at 628 and 630 Hamilton Street, c. 1870

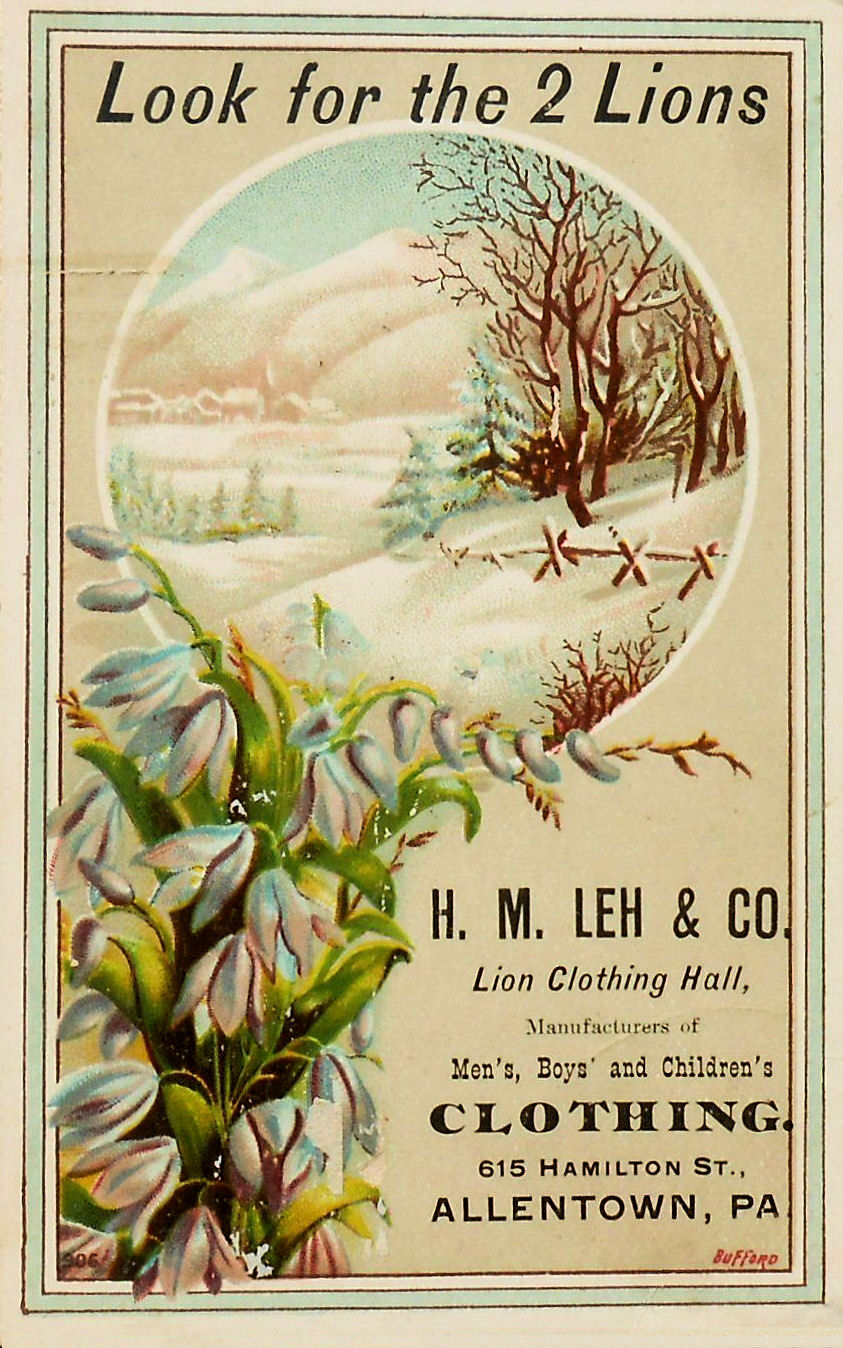
An 1890 trading card from H M Leh & Company

Henry Leh, the founder of Leh's, was born in Allentown, Pennsylvania in 1830. On April 25, 1850, he founded the store at 626 Hamilton Street in Allentown. He initially sold ready-to-wear clothes to what were then 4,000 citizens of Allentown, something that was then very rare in that part of the state. And if they needed boots and shoes, he would not only sell them but make them. The building was a four-story building. The upper three floors housed Leh's manufacturing factory, and the ground floor was Leh's retail store.

The early years were not easy for the retail store he first named Neleigh & Leh. Leh had to get all of his merchandise by canal boat and stagecoach. Between 1850 and 1860, he had several business partners. In the latter part of the 1850s, the company struggled but survived a national economic depression.

The American Civil War helped Leh's development. The Union Army needed boots. Since Simon Cameron, then the Secretary of War, was from Pennsylvania, many federal government contracts flowed to the state. With a contract to make boots, Leh was able to put the store on a sound fiscal footing.

During the Civil War, Leh had a manufacturing payroll of about 175 people, with sixty to sixty-five machines in constant use. He manufactured about 500 pairs of boots and shoes each day. He also expanded his business to include the neighboring stores at 628 and 630 Hamilton Street.

As Allentown prospered in the post-Civil War era, so did Henry Leh. The store was well established in 1874 when a young man named Horatio Koch obtained a job there as a shipping clerk. Koch quickly advanced in the company. Shortly thereafter, Koch married Leh's daughter, Sallie, joining the two families, and Koch became a partner in Leh's Department Store.

At the 1876 Centennial Exposition in Philadelphia, Leh had a display of men's and women's boots and shoes that his manufacturing plant produced. The judges at the Exposition noted that it was, "A good exhibit of Women's, Misses and Children's heavy and substantial shoes, prime stock and workmanship, and good, full fitting and strong work. The heavy mining boot, borgan and buckle shoe are very superior articles for purposes intended. Prices of goods were very reasonable".

In the 1880s, the store had expanded its products beyond shoes, selling dry goods, fabrics, ready to wear clothing, and other goods, and turning the company into a department store.

In April 1880, the Reliable Lion Clothing Store was purchased on the southeast corner of 7th and Hamilton Streets, which became the H. M. Leh Lion Clothing Store selling ready-to-wear clothing.

Lion Hall Clothing was sold in the summer of 1895, becoming Dresher & Stephens Lion Clothing Store. Three years later, in 1898, it was renamed Shankweiler and Lehr, which operated as a men's store into the 1980s.

=== 20th century ===
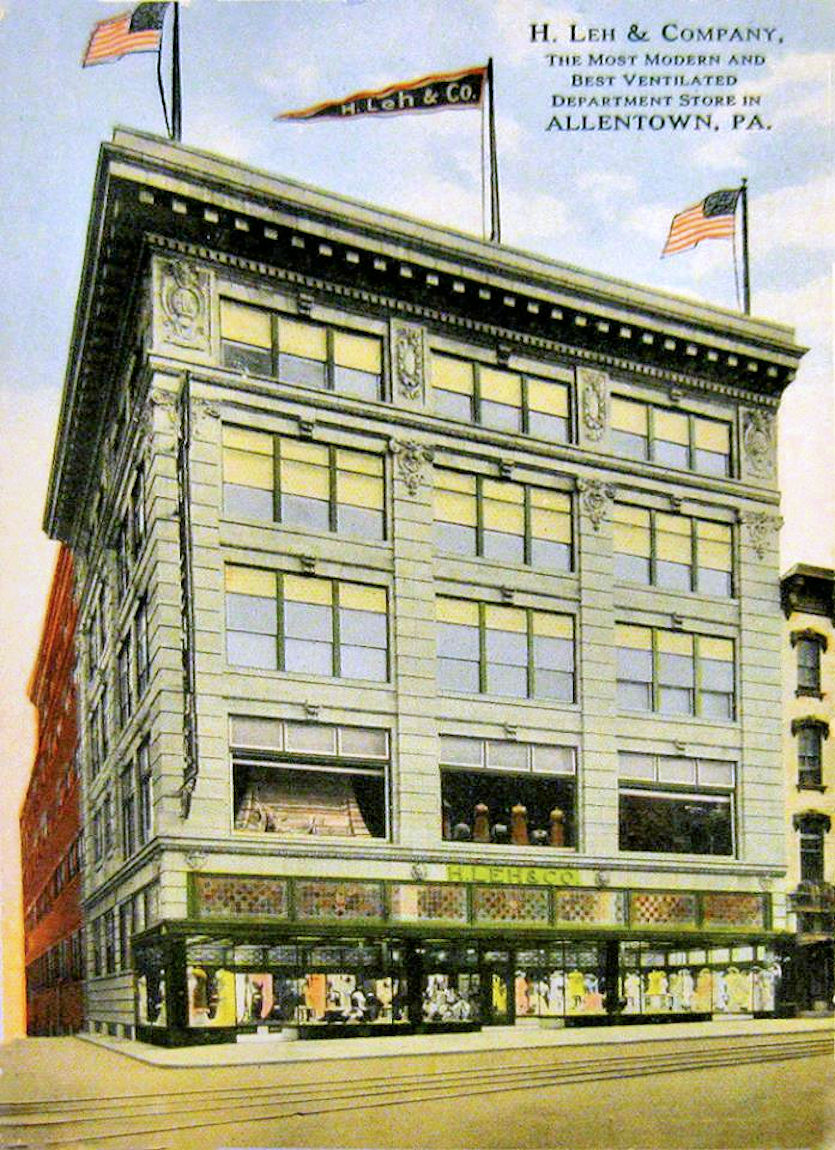
A remodeled Leh's store in Allentown, c. 1910

Horatio's nephew, William Koch, opened his own store on the southwest corner of Center Square in present-day Center City Allentown. Originally called the Stillwagon Store, it was later named Koch & Person in 1905. It remained in bushiness until 1920, when it closed and was demolished in order to make way for the new Merchants National Bank building. With the Center Square store closing, Pearson's retired and the business became the Will Koch Clothing store in the 900 block of Hamilton Street until closing in the 1930s due to the Great Depression. The Koch Brothers store at the Hotel Allen remained in business until 1954, taking over the entire building when the hotel went out of business in 1947.

Henry Leh's died in 1910, and his sons and the Kochs attempted to modernize the store. A year later, in 1911, the newly remodeled H. Leh & Co. store reopened. It was a bright modern building worthy of the new century in which it was born. The building had a fourth floor added to it and a new facade facing Hamilton Street. It was the first of several expansions of the downtown building over the next 50 years.

The company acquired three buildings at 25/27/29 south 7th Street and integrated it into the main store, giving it an "L" shape.

In 1931, the former Tallman's Cafe at 632 Hamilton Street was purchased and the store again expanded, while also adding a new, modern facade while expanding the store. When H. Leh & Co. celebrated its 100th anniversary in 1950, it was considered as solid a local institution as its neighbor, Zion's Reformed UCC Church, known as the hiding place of the Liberty Bell for nine months during the British occupation of Philadelphia in 1777 and 1778 during the American Revolutionary War.

Christmas season found the store packed, and the arrival of Santa Claus at Leh's was a major event. Although not quite as flamboyant as Hess's showplace at 9th and Hamilton Streets, Leh's still held its own.

In the late 1950s, an appearance by pop singing idol Frankie Avalon packed the store with teenagers.

By the late 1960s, the arrival of the suburban mall was already starting to hurt downtown stores. To keep its customers, Leh's countered by building a large parking deck in 1970. Leh's peak came in the late 1980s, when it brought in $25 million in its retail sales over the course of the year. At that point, it ranked among the nation's top 100 department stores.

Leh's also had locations, all of which ultimately closed, at:

- Bethlehem Square in Bethlehem, Pennsylvania (1988-1996)
- Quakertown (1972-1996)
- Whitehall Mall in Whitehall Township, taking over the bankrupt Zollinger and Harned store (1978-1996), which is now a Gold's Gym and buybuy BABY store.

Also, after Leh's closing, remaining merchandise was sold at:

- Leh's Close-Outs & More, South 4th Street in Allentown

After its peak, a serious decline in Center City Allentown's economic fortunes led to the sale of Hess's to The Bon-Ton in 1994. In 1994, Leh's flagship store closed for good. Two years later, Bon-Ton closed the flagship at 9th and Hamilton Streets, putting an end to the era of the department store in downtown Allentown. The five-story Leh's building was renovated and is now used by Lehigh County.

On June 29, 1996, all of the remaining locations closed.

=== Historical timeline ===
Leh's Department Store, Timeline 1850-1996

- April 25, 1850: Henry Leh opens store on Hamilton Street in Center City Allentown. The same year, he starts producing shoes and boots.
- 1861-1865: Leh obtains the contract to make boots for the Union Army during the American Civil War
- 1884: Horatio B. Koch becomes a partner and marries Leh's daughter Sallie
- 1898: Leh supplies boots to the U.S. Army during Spanish–American War
- 1910: Henry Leh dies
- 1911: Newly expanded H. Leh & Company store reopens, but its shoe and boot making factory closes
- 1920: Horatio B. Koch dies
- 1928: Store undergoes major expansion
- 1936: Store expands again despite Great Depression
- 1950: Store marks 100th anniversary. John Leh II and H. Thomas Koch Jr., great grandsons of Henry Leh, join company.
- 1970: Leh's opens parking deck
- 1972: Leh's opens first satellite store in Quakertown, Pennsylvania
- 1978: Leh's opens Whitehall Mall store in Whitehall Township, taking over the bankrupt Zollinger-Harned store, established in 1966 at the neighboring Zollinger-Harned Company Building on Hamilton Street
- 1988: Third satellite store opens in Bethlehem, Pennsylvania
- 1992: Co-owners John Leh II and William Leh buy out the co-founding Koch family's interest
- 1994: Leh's closes its flagship store in Allentown
- March 11, 1996: William Leh announces closing of remaining department stores

== See also ==
- Hess Brothers
- List of historic places in Allentown, Pennsylvania
- Zollinger and Harned
