= Zollinger-Harned Company Building =

- U.S. National Register of Historic Places
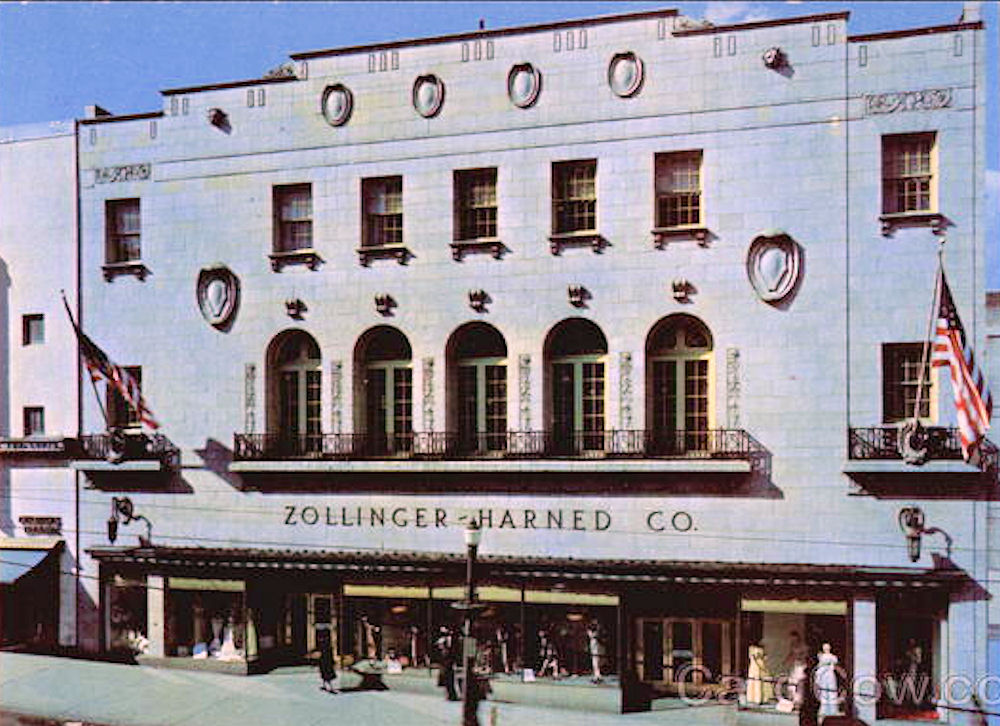
- Zollinger-Harned Department Building in Allentown in 1945

- Location within Pennsylvania Location within the United States
- Location: 605-613 West Hamilton Street and 14-16 North 6th Street, Allentown, Pennsylvania, U.S.
- Coordinates: 40°36′10″N 75°28′14″W
- Area: 0.4 acres (0.16 ha)
- Built: 1925-1926
- Architect: Hardner, George H.; Jacoby & Everett
- Architectural style: Classical Revival
- NRHP reference No.: 79002288
- Added to NRHP: December 17, 1979

The Zollinger-Harned Company Building, now known as The Sovereign Building, is a historic department store building on Hamilton Street in the Center City section of Allentown, Pennsylvania.

== History ==
=== 19th century ===
Zollinger-Harned was founded as Lawfer & Steckel by William R. Lawfer and W. R. Steckel in 1866 in Allentown, at the corner of Church and Hamilton streets, at 626 Hamilton Street. The store carried a large stock of dry goods, notions, and groceries.

The business was continued by the original partners until 1874, when Steckel disposed of his interest to George W. Hartzell. Hartzell retired in 1876, and the firm was reconstituted as W.R. Lawfer & Company.

Lawfer expanded the business and purchased the larger buildings at 611 and 613 Hamilton Street, combining the structures into one large building, which opened in March 1882.

The firm sold a wide number of women's dresses, and coats. As the firm grew, it expanded with books, toys, jewelry, kitchen crockery, carpets, and men's and children's clothing.

To accommodate the expansion, Lawfer expanded the store by first purchasing two properties at 12 and 16 North Sixth Street, which were merged into an "T" shape with the Hamilton Street buildings extending north to Court Street and the Sixth Street buildings merging into the Hamilton Street building on the right side of the property. The present-day Sovereign Building retains this basic design. A second expansion added the stores at 607 and 609 Hamilton Street to the store. Lawfer adverted the store as "Allentown's Big Department Store".

Lawfer was friends with John Wanamaker, a Philadelphia-based retail entrepreneur. Lawfer worked for Wanamaker in the 1850s and 1860s prior to opening his own store in Allentown.

William Zollinger, who lived in Sandusky, Ohio, operated the Zollinger Department store the 1880s.

The new owners tore down the amalgamation of separate storefronts and erected a single large three-story building at 607-613 Hamilton Street that wrapped around to the right with a double storefront at 14 to 16 North Sixth Street.

=== 20th century ===
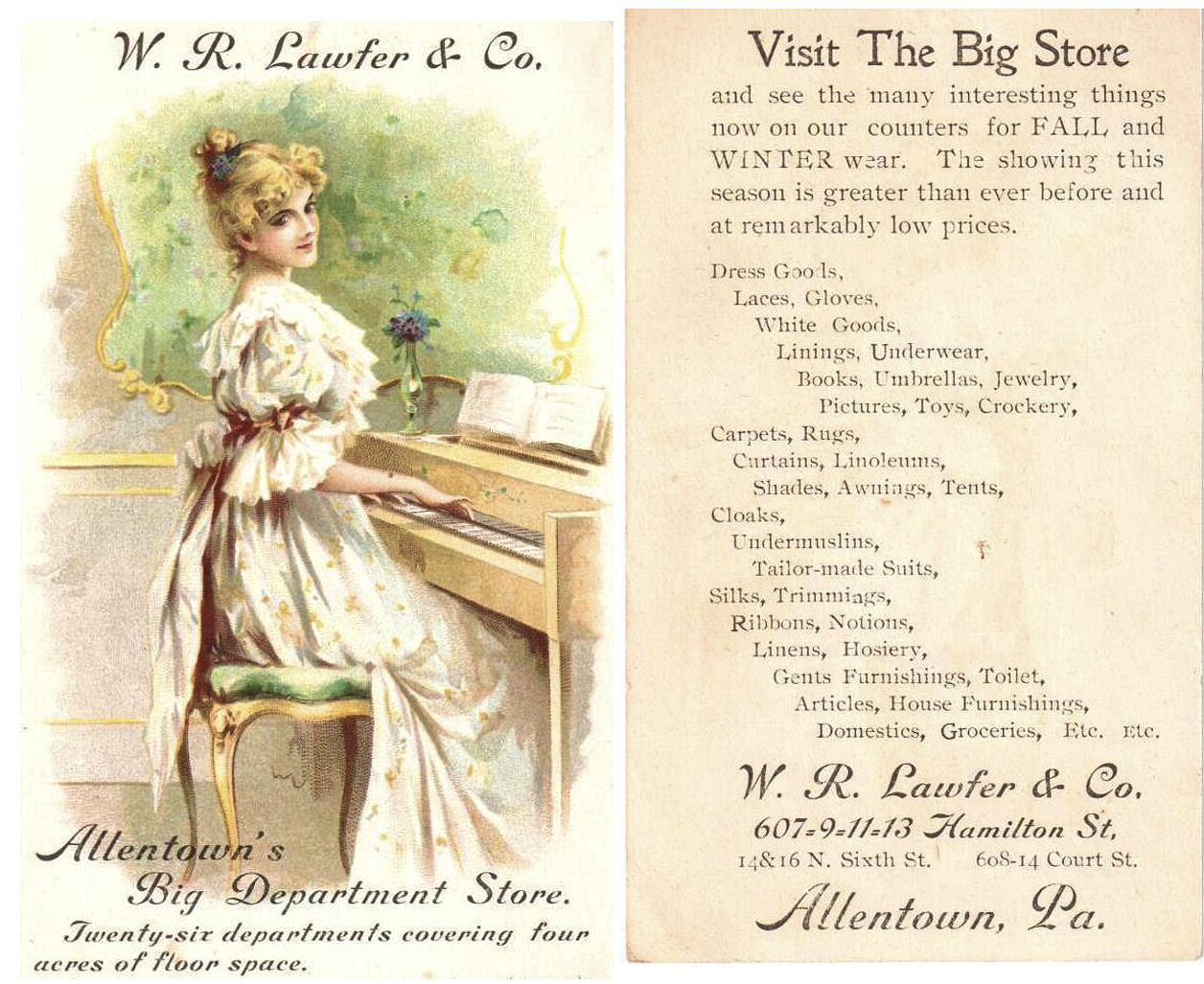
A W. R. Lawfer & Company trading card issued in 1905

While still at Wanamaker's department store, Lawfer began decorating his own store as early as Christmas in 1904. Lawfer's was the first local department store to feature a separate toy department that it called "Toyland". At the center of the toy display that Christmas was a twenty-four-foot-tall, one-ton figure it called "Santa Claus’ Father." It is not known if this was an attempt to combine the English figure known as “Father Christmas” with Nast's character.

On December 9, 1905, local newspapers ran the first announcement of Lawfer's live Santa Claus. "Visit Santa Claus at his Cave in Toyland," it read. "If you haven’t paid Santa a visit in his pretty Toyland, you had better come soon. Santa remembers every little face, you know, and he says there are some chubby little folks on his list he hasn’t seen yet. Bring your letters and put them in the letter box in his cave."

W. R. Lawfer died suddenly on September 11, 1900, and the store was taken over by his three sons, J. Harry Lrawfer, John N. Lawfer, and Alvin W. Lawfer. They ran the business for the next several years until 1903 when J. Harry Lawfer retired from the firm, turning his share of the business to John N. Lawfer. John N Lawfer subsequently sold his share to Alvan Lawfer prior to starting his own carpet and drapery store at 709 Hamilton Street.

In 1906, the business was sold to Nathan Polwell of Philadelphia, who sent his nephews W.C. Harned and C.J. Early to manage Allentown's first department store. The establishment's name was changed from W.R. Lawfer Co. to Lawford-Harned Co. and later to Zollinger-Harned Co.

The "Zollinger" refers to a W.R. Zollinger, who owned a department store in Canton, OH. In addition to W.R. Lawfer Co., Polwell had also purchased Zollinger's store in Ohio and a third store owned by a Mr. Smith in Wilmington, Delaware. Polwell used the "Zollinger" name for all three stores to further his plan of establishing a chain of department stores.

In 1926, the store expanded again by purchasing 605 Hamilton Street, which it incorporated into its existing building. As part of the expansion, the store was remodeled into a seven bay wide building with Classical Revival style influences. It featured architectural terra cotta panels and richly detailed bronze display window surrounds. This remodeling was completed in 1926.

Nathan Polwell passed ownership over to his nephew Charles E. Polwell, who retained ownership until 1960. At that point, ownership was taken over by Allen Theodore Vollmer and Robert V.H. Harned. Allen Vollmer served as president until he retired due to poor health in 1963, when his son Donald Vollmer assumed control.

The store operated successfully for decades, and was the first of the Allentown department stores to open a branch at Whitehall Mall in Whitehall Township, an Allentown suburb, in 1966.

In 1970, Donald Vollmer, then president of the store, purchased Bears Department Store in York, Pennsylvania and renamed it Zollinger-Harned, making it the third store in the then Zollinger-Harned chain. A fourth store in the Wyoming Valley Mall near Wilkes-Barre opened in 1971.

Like many other major department stores in the 1970s, however, suburbanization and the growth of indoor shopping malls led to declining sales of large department stores in Allentown's central business district. In 1975, Zollinger's was still profitable, but in 1976 the losses began to mount.

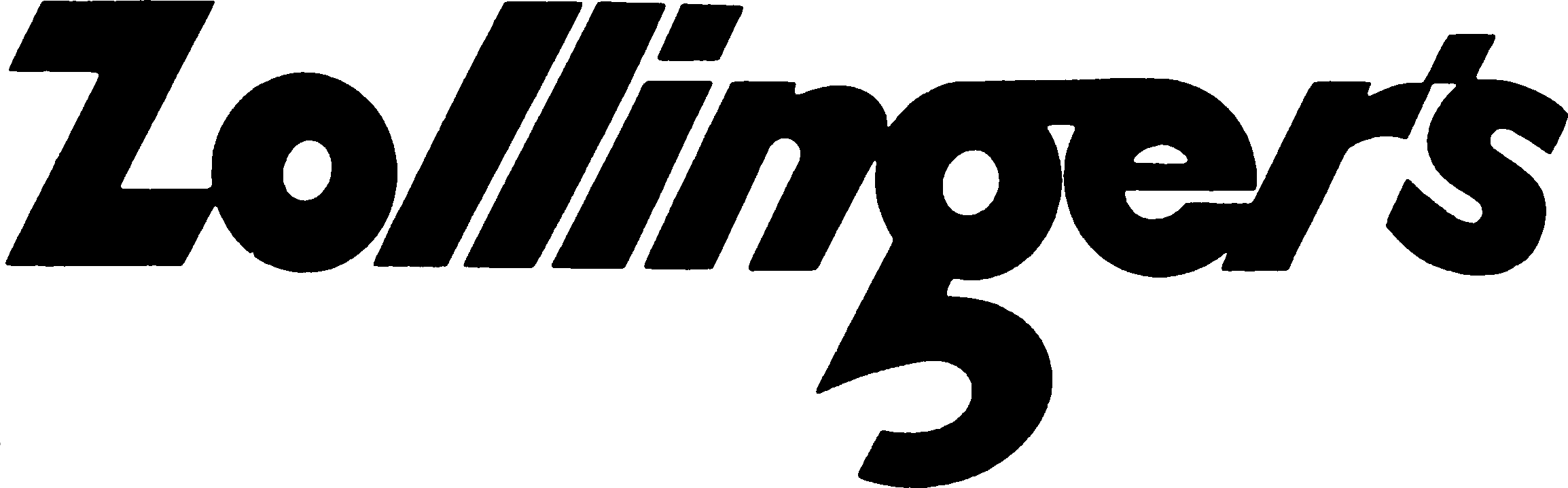
Zollinger's final logo

In February 1977, Vollmer sold his interest to Allentown clothier Sigmund Levin for $1 and other considerations. A month later, Levin filed for Chapter 13 bankruptcy protection from creditors while the company reorganized. Over the next eleven months, the company initiated a variety of tactics to return to financial health, but the financial slide continued.

A few months after the petition was filed, the company abandoned its York store, and its merchandise was eventually sold and the store closed. In October 1977, its Wyoming Valley Mall store was sold to Hess's. Its Allentown flagship and Whitehall Mall stores lasted through the Christmas shopping season of 1977. However, Zollinger-Harned filed for complete bankruptcy on January 30, 1978, and closed its doors for the last time.

==== Sovereign Building ====
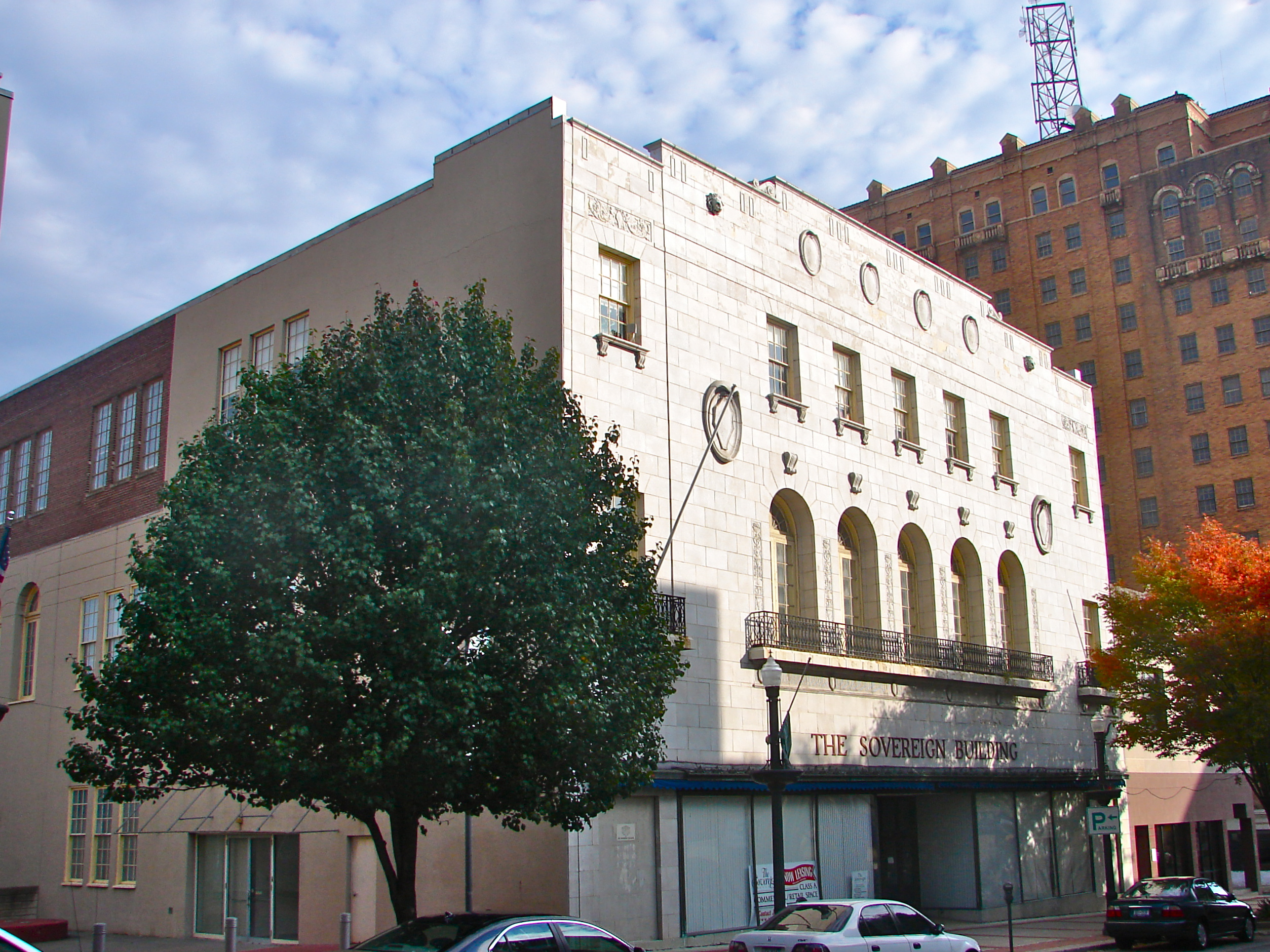
The Sovereign Building, built on the grounds of Zollinger-Harned in Allentown

The Whitehall Mall store was sold to Leh's. For several years, the flagship store on Hamilton Street in Allentown remained vacant.

In December 1982, the Allentown store was purchased by Sovereign Realty and Development. The building was renovated and reopened as the Sovereign Building in May 1984. Renovations included a glass-arched entrance from a pedestrian plaza between Hamilton and Court streets leading to a "grapefruit-domed" lobby with a decor of antique brass, mirrors, greenery and wing-backed chairs. The main floor and basement were developed into retail spaces, while the upper floors were turned into forty-two private office suites.

Sovereign later went into financial difficulties and the building was sold at a sheriff's sale on September 22, 1989.

The Zollinger-Harned Company Building was added to the National Register of Historic Places in 1979.

=== 21st century ===
The building now operates as an office building with an owner who resides in Philadelphia.

== See also ==
- Hess's
- Leh's
- List of historic places in Allentown, Pennsylvania
