= Americus Hotel =

- U.S. National Register of Historic Places
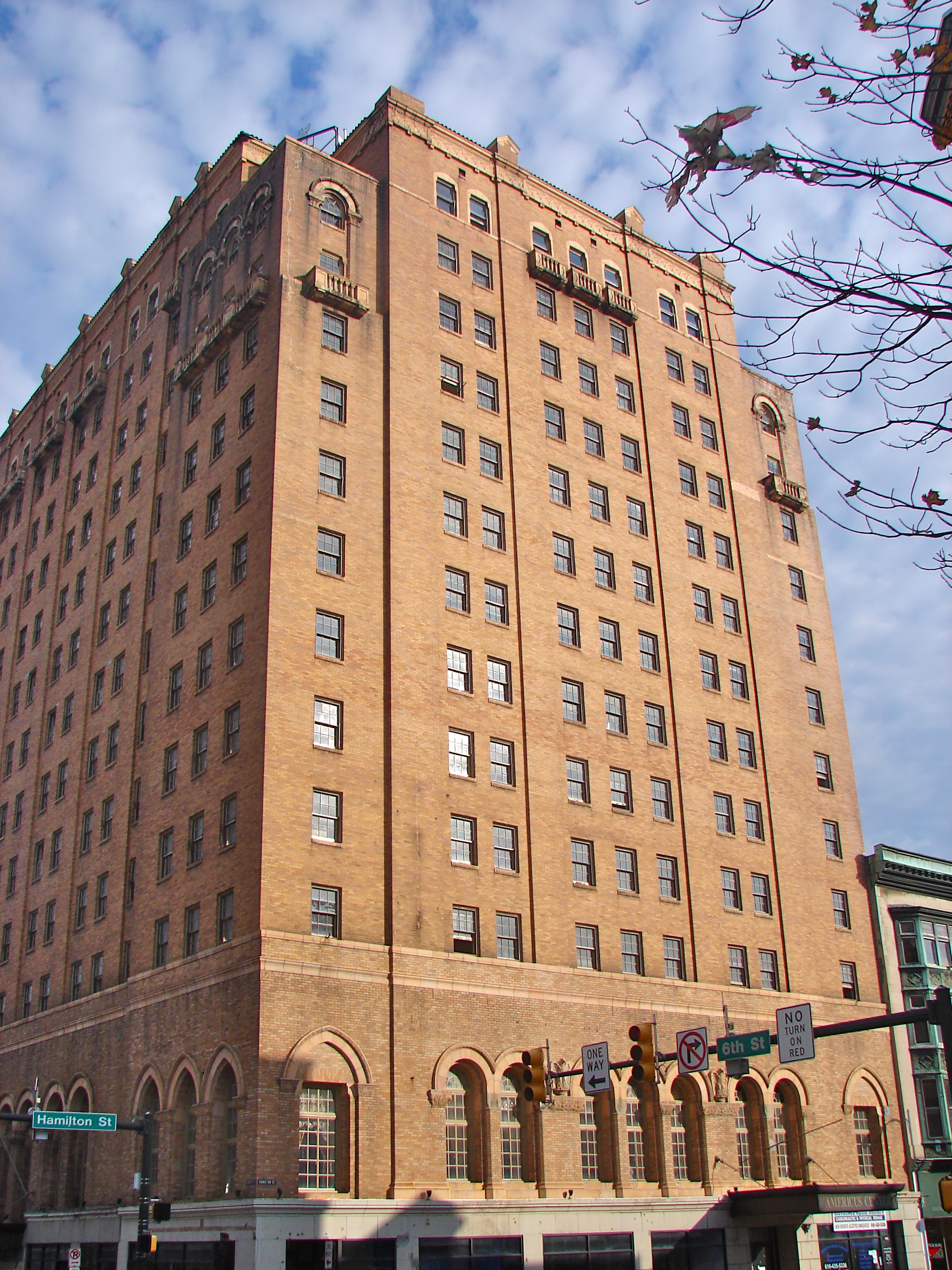
- Americus Hotel in Allentown in October 2011

- Location within Pennsylvania Location within the United States
- Location: 541 West Hamilton Street, Allentown, Pennsylvania, U.S.
- Coordinates: 40°36′11″N 75°28′11″W
- Area: less than one acre
- Built: 1926–1927
- Built by: Roberts & Roller
- Architect: Ritter & Shay
- Architectural style: Italo-Iberian
- NRHP reference No.: 84003454
- Added to NRHP: August 23, 1984

Americus Hotel is a historic hotel in Allentown, Pennsylvania. Built between 1926 and 1927, it is a 13-story yellow brick building located 541 West Hamilton Street in Center City Allentown.

The hotel has a classic 1920s Jazz Age design and was built by a group of Allentown businessmen who wanted to erect a first-class hotel in Center City Allentown, the city's central business district.

In 1984, in recognition of its historic significance, the hotel was listed on the National Register of Historic Places. The hotel also has been named one of the nation's Historic Hotels of America by the National Trust for Historic Preservation.

== History ==
=== 19th century ===
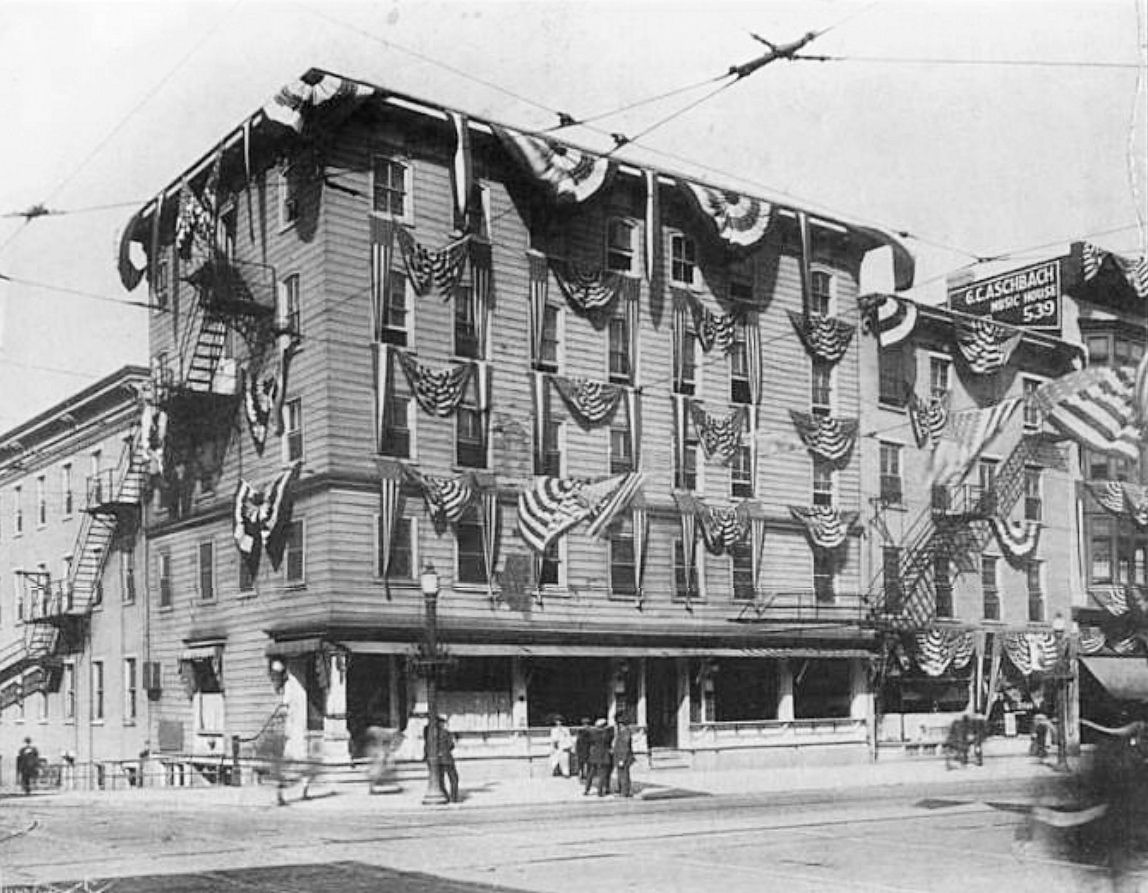
Americus Hotel, then called American Hotel, decorated for Armistice Day on November 11, 1918

The site of the Americus Hotel had been used as a hotel since 1810, when the population of Allentown, then known as Northampton Towne, was approximately 700. That year, Abraham Gangawere built a two-story tavern on the northeastern corner of 6th and Hamilton streets. Under the later ownership of Charles Seagraves, one of the leading businessmen of 19th century Allentown, the inn was enlarged and renamed as the Northampton Inn.

President Martin Van Buren, the nation's eighth president of the United States, slept at the hotel in 1837.

=== 20th century ===
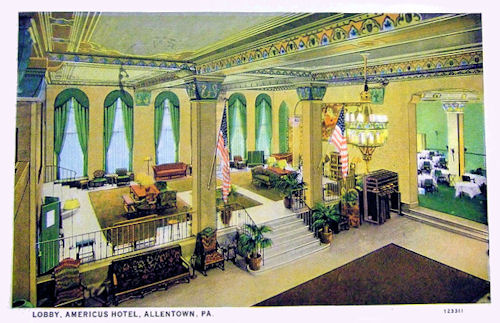
A 1928 postcard illustration of the Americus Hotel lobby

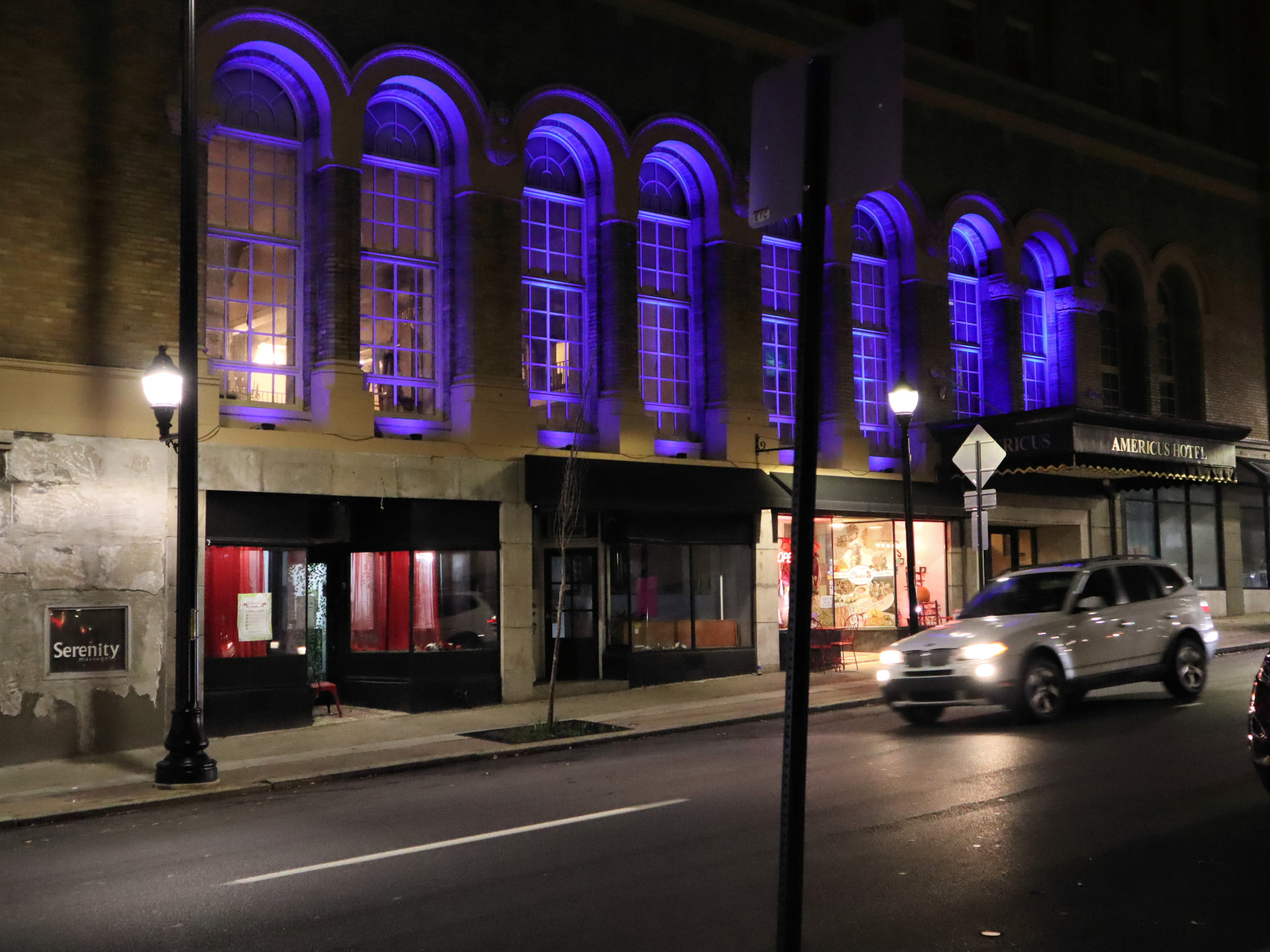
Americaus Hotel at night in January 2017

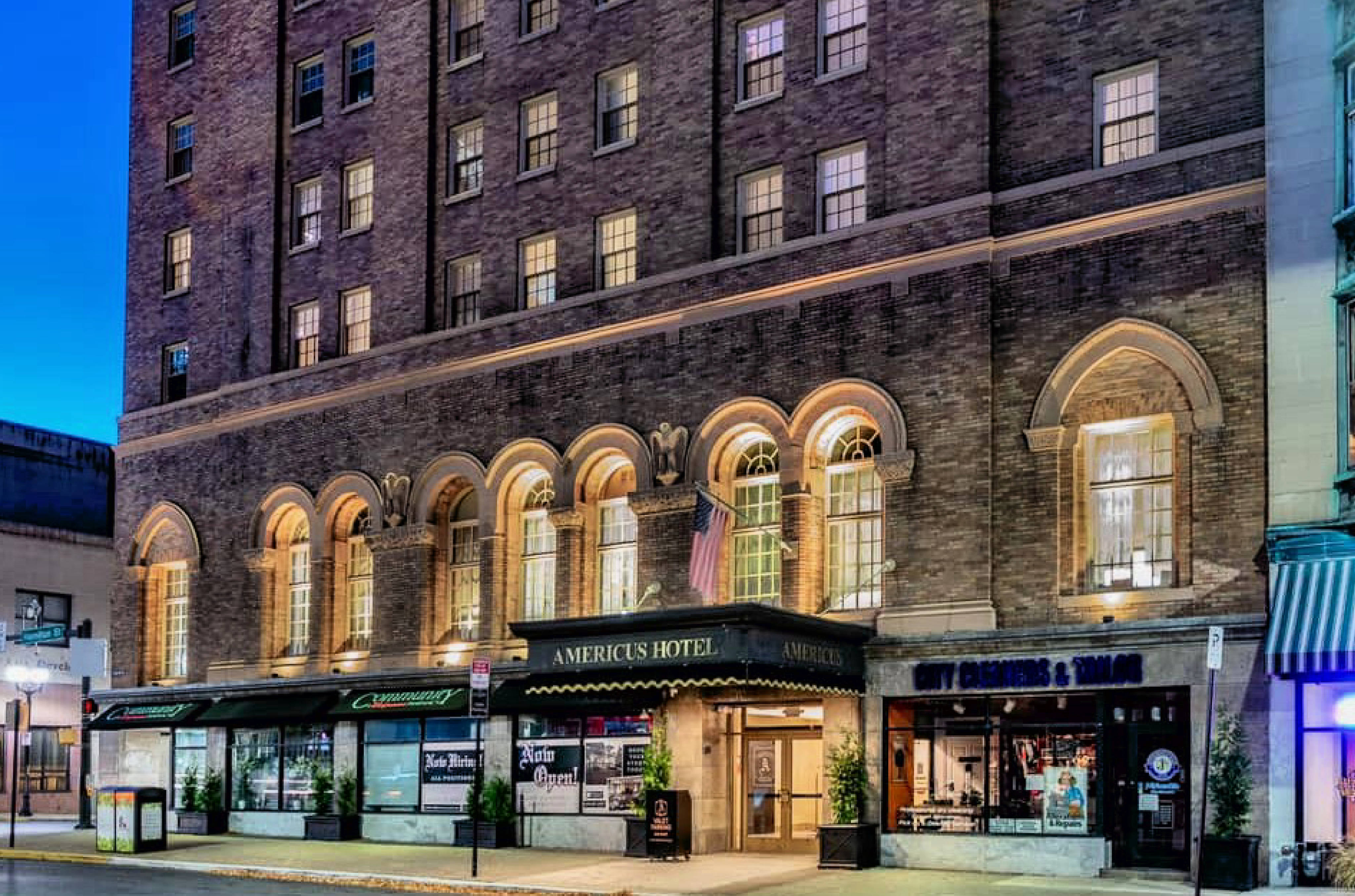
Americus Hotel in February 2022

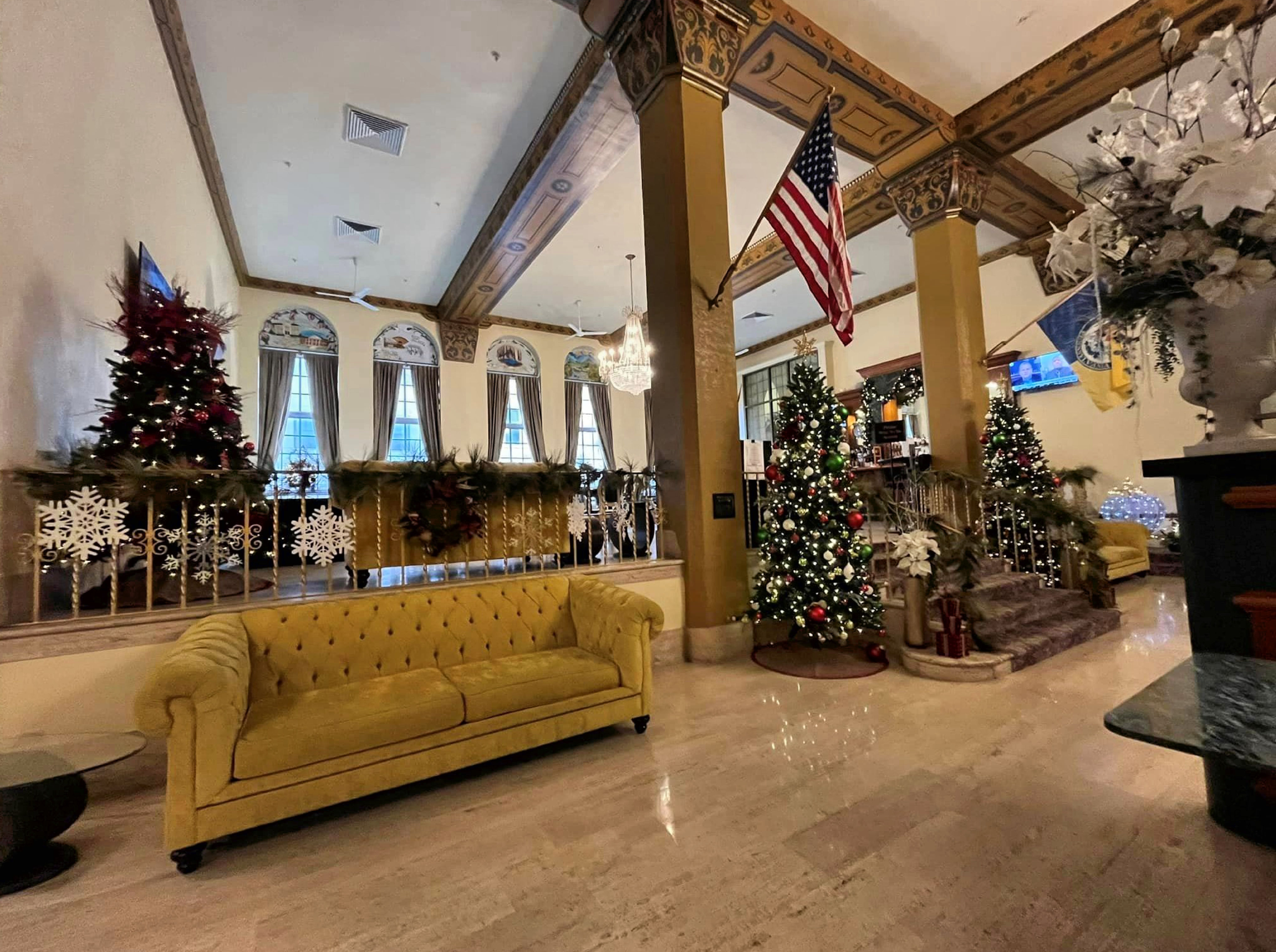
The Americus lobby during the Christmas season in 2022

Following its 19th century success, the old hotel gradually declined. In 1924, Aaron Potruch purchased the hotel's lot from George W. Seagreaves' estate for $500,000. Planning on building a new hotel and office building, he cleared the ground and tore down the hotel. A month later, however, Potruch was contacted by Albert D. "Bert" Gomery, who suggested that his idea of a new hotel was something of a local joke. Over the years, according to press accounts, many new hotels had been proposed but never built.

During the early 20th century, before automobile use became popular, a stagecoach line, co-owned by Seagraves, was headquartered at the location of the present-day hotel. Later renamed as the American Hotel, the hotel expanded to five stories prior to World War I. Used frequently by local salesmen and the traveling public, it became known for its excellent cuisine.

Gomery, president of Allentown's Chamber of Commerce, was born in Lehighton and relocated to Allentown in 1894. With his brother J. Edgar, he had built the wholesale produce firm of Gomery Brothers into a prosperous company. In 1917, Gomery had branched out by purchasing a building at 4th and Turner Streets from Cedar Crest College, then known as the Allentown College for Women, and converted it into College Hotel.

Unlike other builders, Gomery left nothing to chance; marshaling the full weight of his business influence, he formed a company with his brother, who was co-partner with fellow Allentown businessman John C. Schwartz, a partner in the Philadelphia-based firm Gomery & Schwartz. The partnership, which also included Allentown National Bank cashier Frank Cressman, was the agent for the Hudson Motor Car Co. in eastern Pennsylvania, New Jersey, and Delaware. Along with W. A. Gibson from Philadelphia, they formed the American Hotel Realty Co.

That winter, after an architectural competition, the Philadelphia firm of Ritter and Shay was awarded the contract. Their plans called for a 270 bedroom structure. After the first round of bids was submitted, however, Gomery found their proposal too costly, and the bid process was repeated. In negotiations, the two sides agreed that two additional floors would be added, resulting in a hotel with 324 bedrooms.

In June 1926, the construction contract was awarded to Roberts and Roller, a Philadelphia-based firm. Work crews dug a new hole for the foundation, but work on the new building did not actually begin for over another year, on July 17, 1926. As the weeks passed, the rigid steel skeleton of the Americus began to rise. At first, it was nothing more than a clatter of riveting jackhammers. But on the street level, its outline began to take shape. With a buff-colored brick, curved Romanesque arches and romantic and superfluous balconies, it was emblematic of the nation's Coolidge-era passion for the exotic world of old Spain.

Construction proceeded rapidly, and Gomery promised it would be completed by September 10, 1927. But the ambitious construction plan confronted complications, which started with an assessment that there were problems with the hotel's foundation. The high cost of materials also caused delays. But Gomery persisted, supervising every detail, including the commission of Philadelphia artist George Harding to create the large murals for the hotel.

Despite the delays, Americus Hotel opened for business only three days behind schedule, on September 13, 1927. In the newspapers of the day, it was reported that the hotel lounge was sunlit through large, full-length windows. The floors were built with colorful tiles; the furniture included overstuffed sofas and chairs.

Hanging on one wall, The Morning Call reported at the time, was a painting of a Spanish dancing girl that depicted "the life of entertainment." The kitchen staff of 22 was overseen by Swiss chef Werner Kloetzli, "formerly of the Palmer House, Chicago," and maitre d'hotel Frederick Botta, who "assured a cuisine that is second to none in the country," according to the newspaper's reporter, who wrote that, upon entering the building, one felt a "changed atmosphere" that created "an air of refinement, just a little bit different, that persists on intruding itself as the splendor of the surroundings unfolds." Newspaper accounts also described the highly polished walnut furniture, travertine marble floors, colorful Harding murals, and polychrome chandeliers, which created a mood in which one could "visualize the glories of old Spain.

Advance reservations were required for the official opening, which took place on the evening of September 13. When the guest list reached seven hundred, many hoping to attend were turned away. At 6:30 p.m., guests in tuxedos and evening gowns arrived to make an inspection tour. Serenaded by a twenty-eight-piece orchestra that was directed by Albertus Meyers, the guests gathered in the hotel's dining room. Floral displays at strategic locations added to the Spanish garden atmosphere. A series of storefronts for tailors and watch repairmen were rented to various small businesses outside of the hotel, on North 6th Street.

For the next 40 years, the Americus Hotel served as a centerpiece of the downtown business and retail district of Allentown. Celebrities and notable people who visited Allentown often stayed at the Americus, and it was common for the hotel to hold various receptions, balls, and high school graduation proms in its ballroom.

In the late 1970s, as the downtown area of Center City Allentown began to change and decline, the fortunes of the hotel mirrored those of the city. Added to the National Register of Historic Places on August 23, 1984, its owners, the Moffa family, signed an agreement with developers to sell the hotel for $2 million, which included tax credits for restoring the building's original character.

On August 7, 1985, the Moffa family sold the property to 29-year-old Mark Mendelson, who acquired it through a $1.25 million loan from . Equibank provided the loan for the mortgage. Former Allentown Mayor Joseph Daddona at that time called the deal "the most exciting thing in this part of town in many years."

Although Mendelson stated that he had invested millions of dollars in the hotel and he was awarded by historic preservation organizations, city construction permit records show that he had, in reality, only spent hundreds of thousands of dollars, excluding the costs for new furniture or improvements that did not require city permits. The most notable improvements of the new hotel were improvements to its dining room and ballrooms.

In 1988, the hotel's image was further bolstered when it secured an affiliation as a Radisson Hotel, but the affiliation lasted only six years. In 1994, facing late payments, bounced checks, and nearly $5 million in liens against the hotel, the hotel was put up for tax sale. No other potential owners stepped forward to bid on the property and assume responsibility for the hotel's debt, however, leaving Mendelson in charge. Mendelson began paying off a portion of the hotel's back taxes.

During this time, the Americus became part of the Clarion Hotels chain in 1995 but continued to spiral downward with broken elevators, leaky plumbing, and accumulating garbage. In 1998, the Clarion affiliation also ended. In response to the hotel's mounting problems, city inspectors revoked its health license.

=== 21st century ===
In August 2002, after a series of fires, broken pipes, and elevator failures, the city of Allentown revoked the occupation permit of the hotel entirely, and its residents were forced to vacate the property.

A series of legal battles between Mendleson and Allentown subsequently ensued with the hotel remaining vacant. Unpaid assessments to the Downtown Improvement District Authority increased to $21,744, back taxes and fines climbed to roughly $37,000, and a water and sewer bill reached nearly $145,000 before Allentown officials finally targeted the property for sheriff's sale.

Scaffolding and canvas were subsequently erected on the sidewalk both on Hamilton Street, and on North 6th Street, to prevent falling masonry from injuring pedestrians. The storefront businesses on North 6th were ordered to close due to the building's deterioration, and the city then also ordered that utilities to the building be cut off in 2005. In 2007, the Americus was ordered sealed for public health and safety reasons. In 2009, Mendleson filed for Chapter 11 bankruptcy and the city of Allentown assumed ownership due to the $600,000 tax lien it held on the property.

In 2009, local businessman Albert Abdouche obtained ownership of the deteriorating hotel from the city for $676,000, announced re-development plans, spent $3.2 million to obtain the property, and started improving it in February 2010. Over the next few years, the interior and exterior were repaired.

In early 2014, Abdouche applied for funding from the Allentown Neighborhood Improvement Zone (NIZ) Development Authority. The project received a tentative go-ahead in February of that year with $13.2 million in NIZ tax revenues to include eighty-five hotel rooms, forty-eight apartments, ten retail storefronts, commercial office space, a street-level sports bar, and restaurants. In return, Abdouche agreed to an independent review of the project to ensure that his construction estimates were correct. He also agreed to post a bond so that, if the costs proved higher than projected, NIZ would be able to select another developer to finish the project.

The newly-renovated hotel reopened on July 27, 2021. In 2022, in recognition of its extensive history, the hotel was inducted into Historic Hotels of America, a program of the National Trust for Historic Preservation.

== See also ==
- List of historic places in Allentown, Pennsylvania
