= German ship Hessen =

Several naval ships of Germany were named Hessen after the state of Hesse, Germany (German: Hessen):

- SMS Hessen (battleship): 13,000 ton Braunschweig-class battleship, launched 1903
- German destroyer Hessen (D184): Hamburg-class (Type 101A) destroyer, scrapped 1991
- German frigate Hessen (F221): Sachsen-class (Type 124) frigate, commissioned 2006

== See also ==
SS Hessen
