= Hesse: The Wanderer and His Shadow =

2012 book by Gunnar Decker

Hesse
- First edition English-language cover
- Author: Gunnar Decker
- Translator: Peter Lewis
- Language: German
- Subject: Hermann Hesse
- Genre: biography
- Publisher: Carl Hanser Verlag
- Publication date: 2012
- Publication place: Germany
- English publication date: 11 May 2018
- Pages: 700
- ISBN: 9783446238794

Hesse: The Wanderer and His Shadow (German: Hesse. Der Wanderer und sein Schatten) is a 2012 biography of the German writer Hermann Hesse. It was written by Gunnar Decker, translated into English by Peter Lewis, and published by Carl Hanser Verlag.

== Summary ==
The book covers Hesse's life and its relation to his literary works, including his mental instability, his low tolerance for other people and his interest in diverse theological, philosophical and mythical materials.

== Reception ==
Reviewers often discussed Decker's skill in writing about a difficult subject. Christoph Irmscher of The Weekly Standard called Decker "a supremely empathetic biographer" as "Hesse wasn’t particularly pleasant to be with". Irmscher further called Decker "a master of biographical ventriloquism". PD Smith, writing for The Guardian, echoed Irmscher's sentiment's regarding the novel's subject. Smith called Hesse "a welcome reminder of Hesse's painfully honest exploration of selfhood", stating that the book is "destined to become the standard work on this difficult, reclusive and often self-destructive writer". Michael Cronin of The Irish Times added that "Hesse’s reputation has fluctuated greatly since his death in 1962 and the translation of this new biography of Hesse by Gunnar Decker is unlikely to win the writer any new admirers".

Reviewers had mixed opinions regarding Decker's writing style. Irmscher compared Decker's "pages of indirect interior monologue" to the works of Gustave Flaubert and Émile Zola. However, Cronin found that "the narrative is dogged by portentous, self-regarding comments that try the patience of even the most accommodating reader". Cronin further added that Decker's "metaphors on occasion are hobbled by their own unrepentant banality". Decker's use of exclamation marks, in particular, was discussed in both positive and negative lights. Irmscher described how Decker "peppers his prose [...] with frequent exclamation marks meant to signal agreement with his crotchety subject." To this point, Cronin referenced W. H. Auden's opinion of exclamation points, stating the overuse of which "is like laughing at your own jokes".
