= Hess Lake =

- Location within Michigan
- Location: Newaygo County, Michigan
- Coordinates: 43.38649°N 85.76781°W
- Type: lake
- Surface area: 755 acres (3.06 km^{2})

Hess Lake is a 755 acres (3.06 km^{2}) lake in Newaygo County, in the U.S. state of Michigan.

It has an easily accessible public boat launch. Wheeler Drain directs agricultural run off into this lake. Agricultural runoff has been a problem in this lake.
