= Whitehall Plaza =

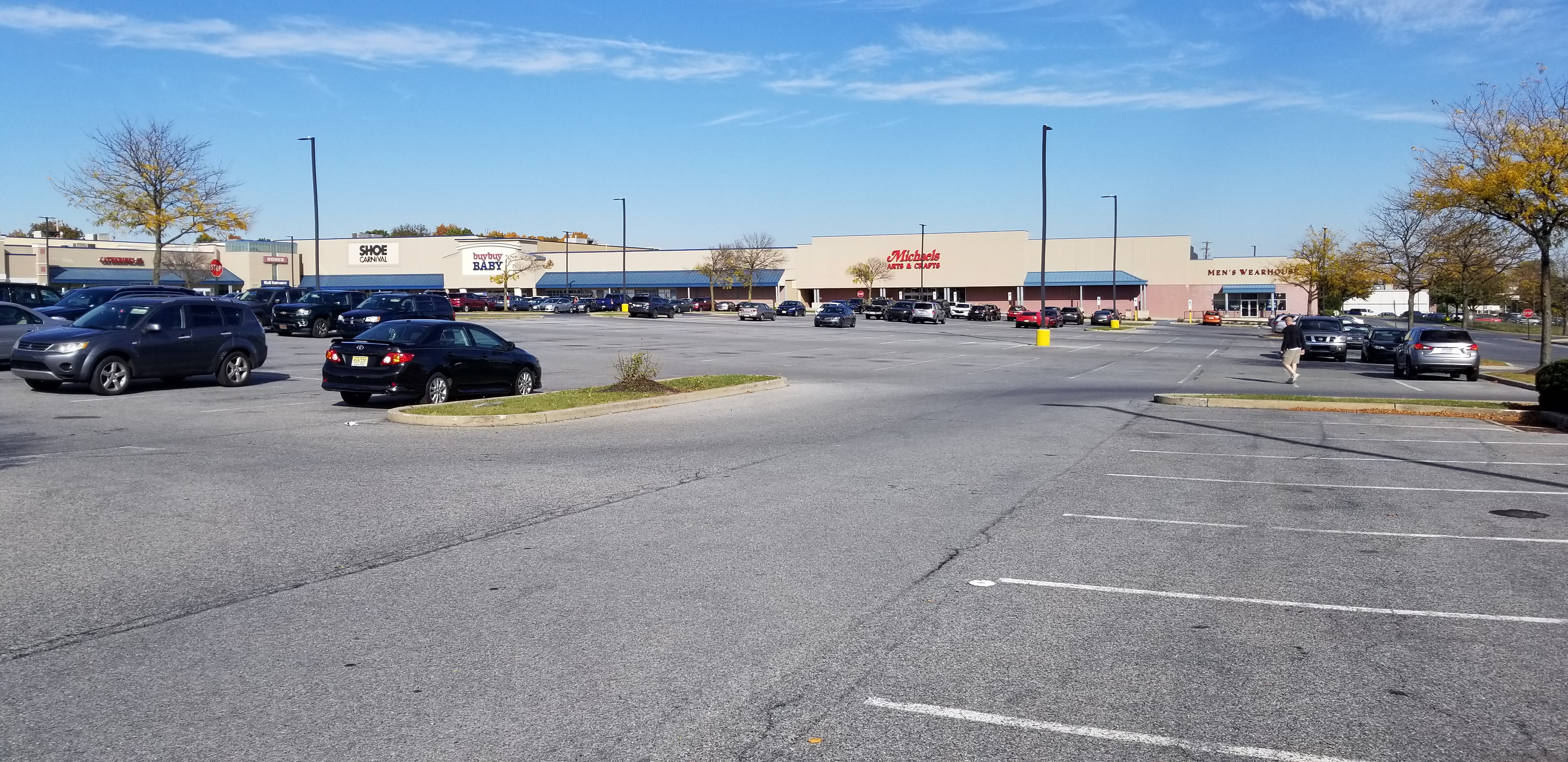
- Exterior of Whitehall Mall, October 2019
- Location: Whitehall Township, Pennsylvania, U.S.
- Coordinates: 40.633264°N 75.486245°W
- Opened: September 26, 1966; 60 years ago
- Developer: Donnelly and Seus Properties Inc.
- Owner: Mishorim Gold Group
- Floor area: 365,071 square feet (33,916.2 m^{2}) or 414,071 square feet (38,468.5 m^{2}) (Note: Whitehall Mall has been previously marketed under various sizes commonly ranging from 590,000 sq ft. to 603,475 sq ft.)
- Parking: 1,966 spaces
- Public transit: LANta bus: EBS Green Line, 103, 210, 211, 319; CT bus: 702

Whitehall Plaza (formerly Whitehall Mall) is a shopping mall located in Whitehall Township, Pennsylvania. It is anchored by Floor & Decor, Kohl's. and The Gravity Vault. Whitehall Mall was one of the Lehigh Valley's first malls and is located across from the Lehigh Valley Mall.

== History ==
=== 20th century ===
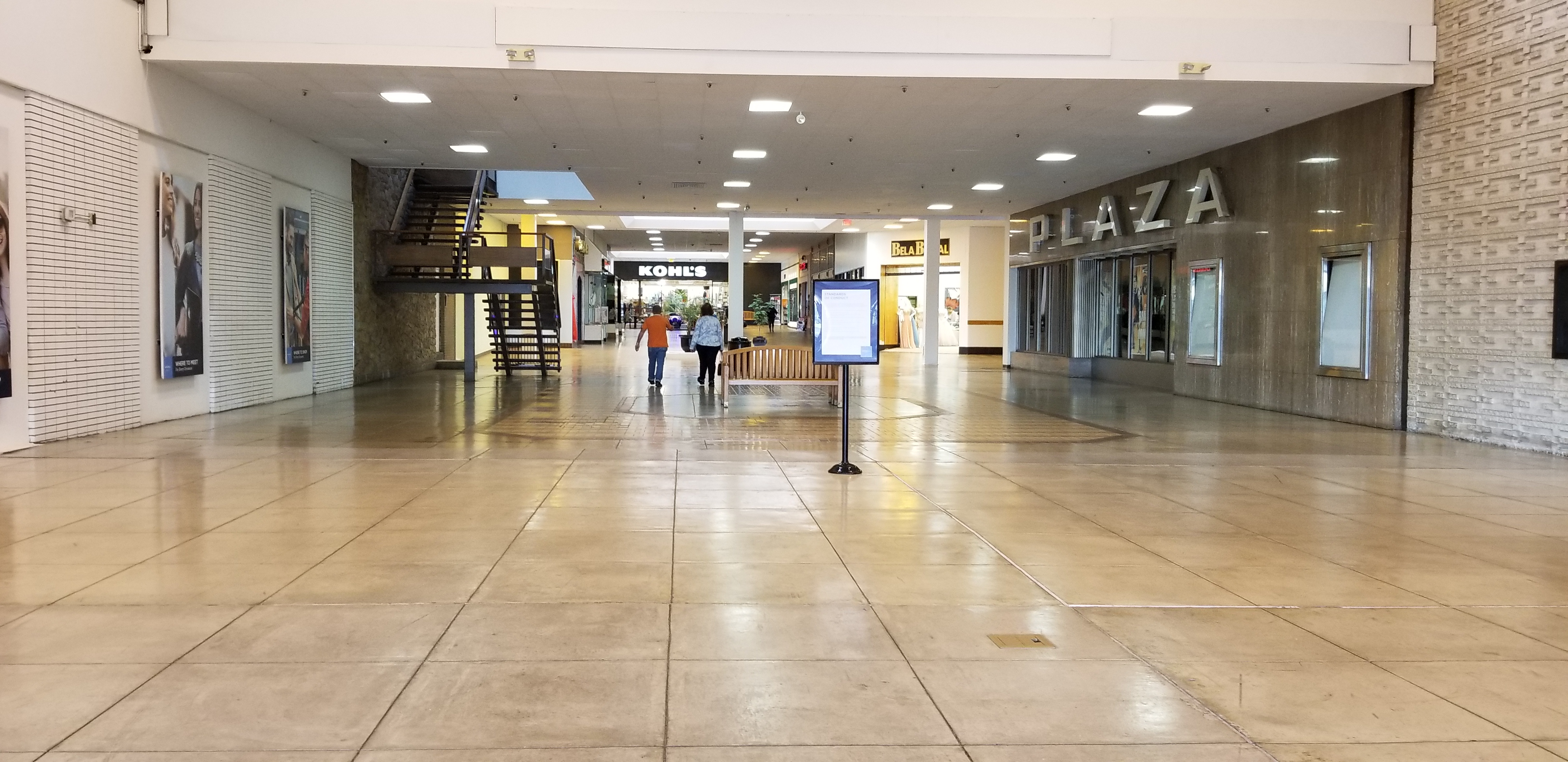
Interior of Whitehall Mall in October 2019

Land for the mall (19 acres (7.7 ha)) was purchased for $125,000 from a farmer and groundbreaking occurred in 1965. Zollinger's opened before the mall on August 15, 1966, with the rest of the mall opening on September 26, 1966. The mall had 52 stores including Sears, Weis Markets, Woolworth's, and Zollinger's. Whitehall Mall expanded in 1973, and in 1978 Leh's opened, replacing the closed (bankrupt) Zollinger's. Kravco become co-owner of the mall with PREIT in 1977 for 4.5 million. Clover opened in March 1982. Sears interior underwent a major overhaul in 1984. The mall received a lowered tax assessment after settling with the county, township, and school district in 1985.

In 1987, a suspicious fire started in the back of the mall that later caused a wall of the Leh's to be demolished. Sears interior underwent another overhaul in 1994 that added 35,000 square feet (3,300 m^{2}) to the sales floor, and converted the former second floor offices to store space. Several stores suffered damage due to a large roof leak in January 1990, with all stores reopening after a few days, and the roofs replacement planned for April. On January 1, 1995, smoking was banned in the mall by its owner, Kravco. Leh's closed in June 1996 due to bankruptcy, with Gallery Furniture taking over its former space in 1997. Clover closed in 1996, with its replacement Kohl's opening in April 1997.

Whitehall Mall received a $15 million renovation in 1998, where it was almost totally de-malled, except for a portion near Kohl's. Retaining the traditional mall look was determined to not be cost effective. Sears was expanded during this time. Three additional buildings were added to the mall's grounds during the renovation. Weis Markets closed during renovations that almost doubled its space. Plaza Theater closed in June 1999 due to having only two screens and being obsolete. The theater was previously operated by Budco, and by AMC from 1987 to 1996.

=== 21st century ===
The opening of Gold's Gym in the mid-2000s was delayed due to design changes. Gold's Gym would use the former Leh's store and Plaza Theater. Raymour & Flanigan relocated to the mall in 2012, occupying two vacant storefronts. PREIT sold its 50% ownership of the Whitehall Mall in 2014 to Washington Prime Group, the mall's other owner. Sears closed in February 2020. PA Fitness (former Gold's Gym) closed in January 2022.

Portions of the mall began to be redeveloped in 2023. Demolition of the former Sears began in June 2023 with Floor & Decor announced as its replacement. Buy Buy Baby and Harmon Face Values would close in July 2023, with Bed Bath & Beyond closing in August 2023. The former Old Country Buffet would be demolished in September 2023 and was replaced by parking. Floor & Decor would open on December 21, 2023. The Gravity Vault opened in March 2025, using the former PA Fitness/Gold's Gym/Plaza Theater space. Mishorim Gold Group purchased the mall in April 2026.

In 2026, Wawa, an American convenience store and gas station chain, opened utilizing the entire space of the former Sears Auto Center. The store opened March 12, 2026.
