= LANta =

Public transportation authority in the Lehigh Valley, Pennsylvania, United States

LANTA

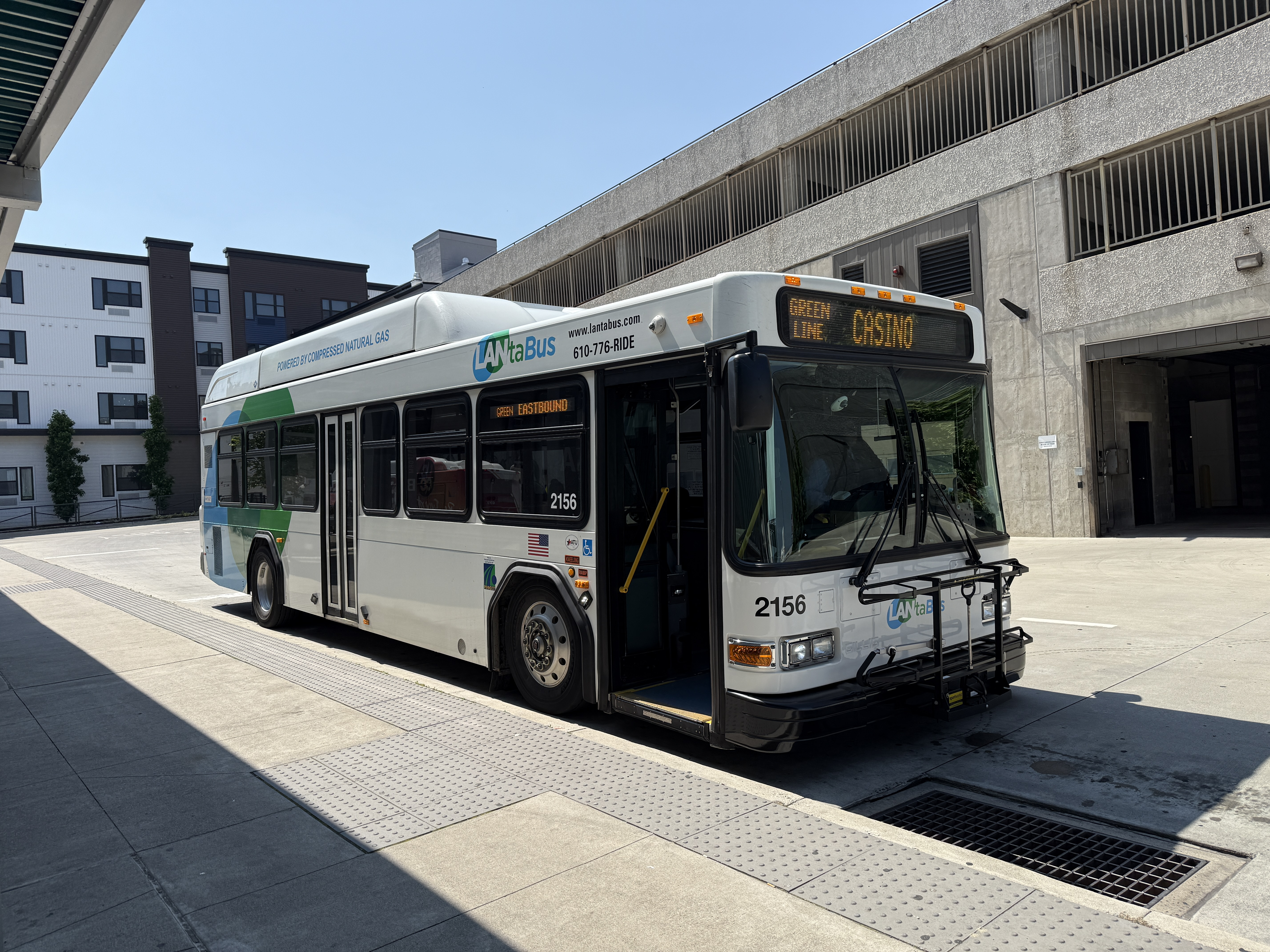
- A LANta bus in Allentown in June 2025
- Founded: 1972
- Headquarters: 1060 Lehigh Street; Allentown, Pennsylvania U.S.
- Locale: Allentown, Pennsylvania, U.S.
- Service area: Lehigh Valley
- Service type: Local Transit bus service
- Routes: 2 bus rapid transit 23 local 8 flex 4 circular (37 total)
- Destinations: Allentown; Bethlehem; Easton
- Hubs: Allentown Transportation Center (ATC); Bethlehem Transportation Center (BTC); Easton Intermodal Transportation Center (EITC)
- Fleet: 89 buses; 97 vans
- Daily ridership: 13,000 (weekdays, Q1 2026)
- Annual ridership: 4,066,900 (2025)
- Fuel type: Compressed Natural Gas, hybrid diesel-electric
- Chief executive: Owen O'Neil
- Website: lantabus.com

The Lehigh and Northampton Transportation Authority (LANTA, stylized as LANta) is a regional public transportation authority that provides public bus and rapid transit service throughout the Lehigh Valley region of eastern Pennsylvania, including Allentown, Bethlehem, Easton, and their respective suburbs.

LANTA is the third-largest public transit agency in Pennsylvania, behind Pittsburgh Regional Transit and SEPTA, with an annual ridership of 4,066,900 as of fiscal year 2023.

== History ==
=== 20th century ===
LANTA was founded in March 1972 in response to meet growing public transportation needs in Lehigh and Northampton. The solution was to create a bi-county, municipal authority that would operate all public transit services in the two counties. Lehigh Valley Transit Company, a private for-profit entity, operated transit services in the Valley. LANTA is governed by the Lehigh and Northampton Transportation Authority board, which has ten voting and two non-voting members appointed by county executives.

In 1973, the Authority replaced the entire 65-vehicle fleet with modern air-conditioned transit coaches. In 1974, LANTA added 30% more service hours and established a peak/off-peak fare structure offering discounts in the off-peak hours and Saturdays to encourage ridership. Seniors, through a state lottery funded program, were offered free fare access during off-peak hours and weekends in 1975.

The Authority's main service is in the urbanized area of Allentown, Bethlehem, and Easton and surrounding Lehigh Valley boroughs and townships. About 380,000 people live within 3/4 mile of a fixed-route bus line. About 15,000 trips are taken daily on the metro city transit system.

In 1985, as the Lehigh Valley transformed from a manufacturing-based economy to a more service and retail-based economy, LANTA was completely revamped, and a new "Metro" system was introduced. This included a color-coded route information system to make riding transit more user-friendly. The following year, discounted fares were introduced as LANTA raised the case fares but kept ticket and pass prices the same and providing frequent riders with a 25% discount.

In 1988, Metro Plus services for the elderly and people with disabilities were introduced. Fully accessible vans are available through contracts with private operators to take people to destinations door-to-door for a higher, zoned fare.

=== 21st century ===
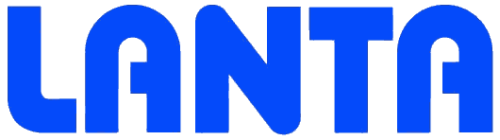
The LANTa logo, variations of which were used from 1972 until 2011

On October 21, 2001, LANTa began offering Sunday bus service to further increase access to public transit. The service is funded through revenues from the farebox, a grant from the Pennsylvania Lottery program with revenue generated by rides taken on the system by seniors 65 and older, grants from Lehigh and Northampton counties, the Pennsylvania Department of Transportation, and the Federal Transit Administration. Combined these grants pay approximately 60% of the cost of operation; the remaining funds come through the lottery program and passenger fares.

Approximately 2,000 trips are taken daily on the Metro Plus paratransit system. A transportation center was established in Bethlehem and centers in Allentown and Easton are under consideration.

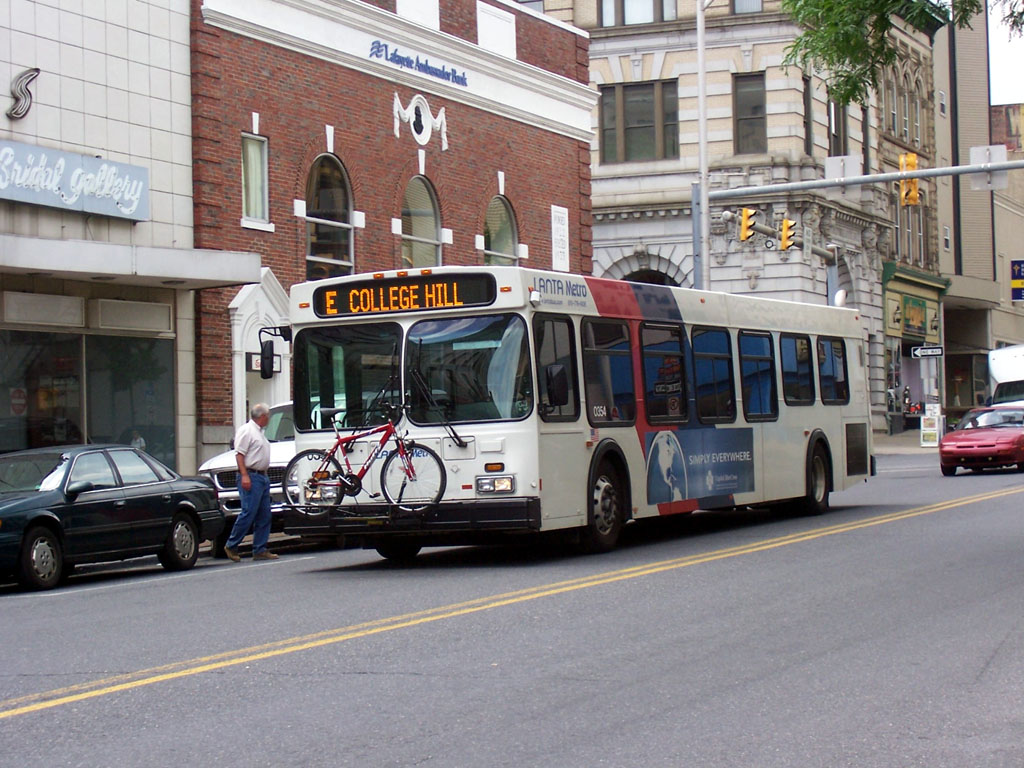
A LANta bus in Easton in June 2005

The agency has grown in more recent years, adding more and more bus routes throughout the Lehigh Valley. Ridership has grown 75% since LANTA's inception. LANTA was formerly involved with The Slater Express Van, Silverline Express, and The Bethlehem Loop.

In August 2011, a new LANtaBus system was introduced that changed the route naming scheme from letters to one-to-three digits. Routes are broken down into six categories, corresponding to the first digit of the line number, and further broken down into specific routes after that in accordance with their second and third digit. For example, LANtaBus route 108 is a trunk route that offers service from Fountain Hill to the Bethlehem Square Shopping center. LANtaBus route 410 provides service for the Allentown School District and only operates during the school year. New bus stop signs were also introduced throughout the system that lists the routes that operate at the stop, compared to the old signs that only displayed a picture of a bus and the words "LANTA Metro".

In 2023, LANTA introduced Enhanced Bus Service (EBS), the first bus rapid transit system in the Lehigh Valley. EBS provides limited stop express service to select stops along core network corridors between Trexlertown and Easton, with the goal of providing headways of 15-minutes or less. Currently under implementation in a multi-phased approach, the system consists of two lines: the Green Line, connecting Whitehall to South Bethlehem, and the Blue Line, connecting Trexlertown to Easton, with the two routes sharing a common route between Allentown and Bethlehem. This allows for continuous 15-minute service between the two cities, a first for the region. Future plans include dedicated boarding stations, traffic signal prioritization, queue jump lanes, and dedicated median bus lanes.

In 2025, the Lehigh Valley Mall requested that LANta move from their transit center at the mall due to safety concerns.

LANta implemented fare hikes and cuts to their bus routes in 2026 due to a lack of state funding.

== Operations ==
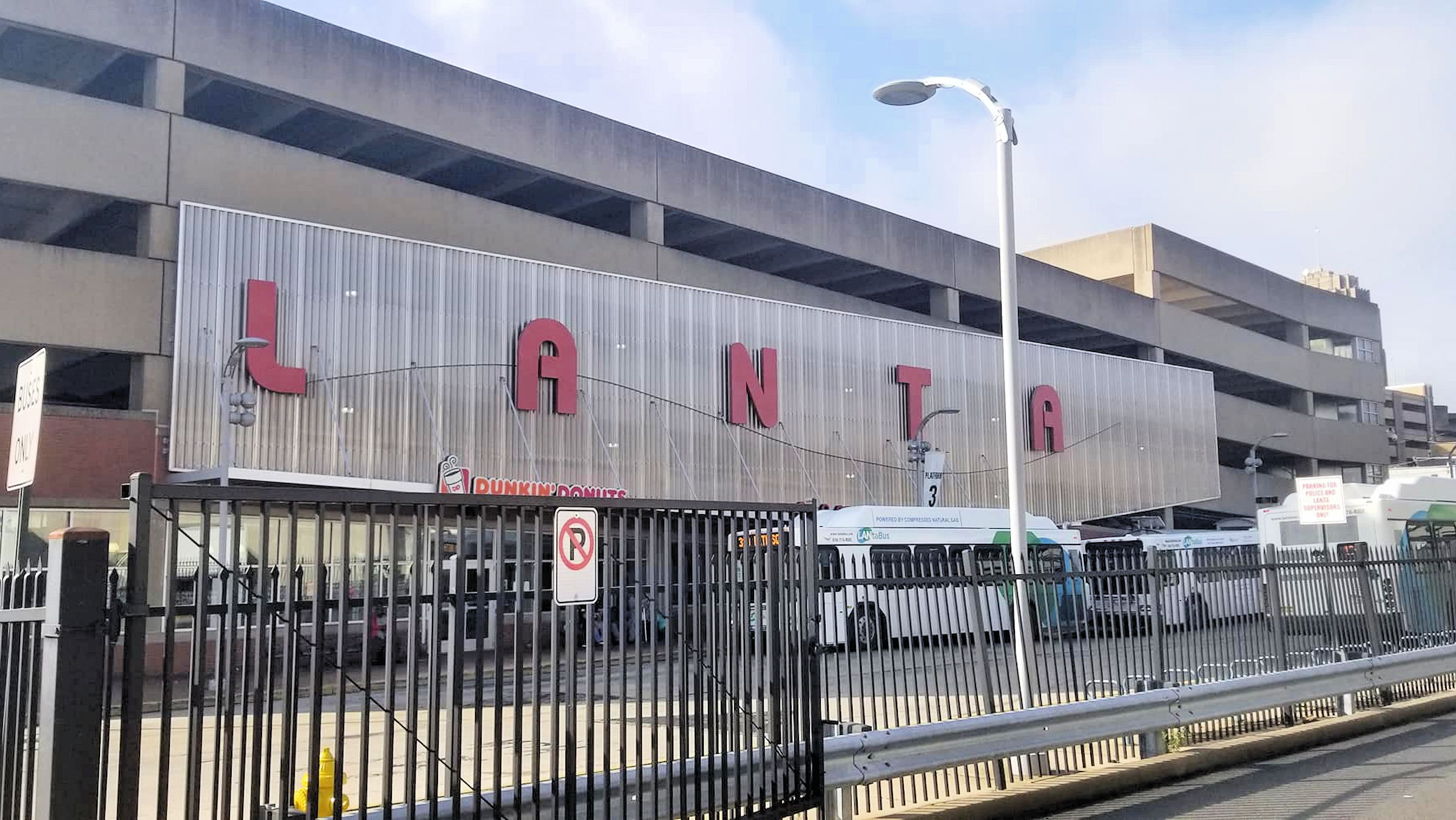
Allentown Transportation Center at 6th and Linden streets in Center City Allentown, in October 2018

LANTA has three operating divisions:

- LANtaBus (formerly Metro): The main transit service that is made up of 28 core, fixed bus routes in the Lehigh Valley. Special service routes add another 17 routes to the total.
- LANtaVan (formerly Metro Plus): A special door-to-door paratransit service for people with disabilities and the elderly.
- Carbon Transit (CT): LANTA's rural transit division operating in Carbon County. Shared ride van services, three fixed-route bus lines, and three flex bus lines comprise the Carbon Transit service.

LANTA is also involved with the 400 Routes, which provide school service in Allentown.

LANTA has eight operating facilities:

- Allentown Garage and Administrative Headquarters. This facility includes vehicle storage and maintenance for LANtaBus Fixed Routes Operations, Renewable Natural Gas fueling, and Administrative Headquarters. It is located at 1060 Lehigh Street in Allentown.
- Easton Garage. This is LANTA's 2nd largest Garage and Maintenance facility for LANtaBus fixed route vehicles. It is located at 3610 Nicholas Street in Easton.
- Carbon Depot. This facility houses Operations, Maintenance, and Administration for Carbon Transit, LANTA's Rural division. CT Bus, CT Flex, and CT Shared Ride all operate out of this facility. It is located at 46 E Locust Street in Nesquehoning.
- LANtaVan Paratransit Facility. This garage and maintenance facility houses LANTA's paratransit fleet. It also contains management offices for LANtaVan and LANtaFlex. It is located at 1423 S 12th Street in Allentown.
- ATC - Allentown Transportation Center. This is LANTA's largest transportation center and serves as an intercity bus hub for the City of Allentown. The Office facility at this location include LANTA's Planning Department as well as a Ticketing and Information center, and is located at 112 N 6th Street in Allentown.
- BTC - Bethlehem Transportation Center. This is LANTA's 2nd largest transportation center and serves as a commuter bus hub for the City of Bethlehem. It includes a Ticketing and Information office, and is located at 635 Guetter Street in Bethlehem.
- EITC - Easton Intermodal Transportation Center. This is LANTA's 3rd largest transportation center and serves as an intercity and commuter bus hub for the City of Easton. NJ Transit also operates out of this facility for bus connections to New Jersey. LANTA operates a Ticketing and Information Center in the facility. It is located at 123 S 3rd Street in Easton.
- Rider Resources Center. This facility houses LANTA's Call Center as well as Paratransit qualifications testing and scheduling. It is located at 60 W Broad Street in Bethlehem.

== Routes ==
LANTA previously operated 35 fixed bus routes in its Metro service. Seventeen LANTA routes serve the inner city areas of the Lehigh Valley, while five numbered routes serve the surrounding areas. Two shuttles named "The Rover" and "The Whirlybird", that operate from the Lehigh Valley Mall and Palmer Park Malls to various neighboring shopping strips and centers, serve as the final daily fixed routes. In the evening, LANTA operates the Starlight service made of seven fixed routes, which serve Center City Allentown, the Lehigh Valley Mall, Palmer Park Mall, Whitehall Township, and Emmaus.

The Night Owl service runs late-night from Center City Allentown to Lehigh Valley Hospital–Cedar Crest. Metro also operates the Silverline Express, which is an express bus that serves the Allentown, Bethlehem, and Easton areas via Route 22 and the Bethlehem Loop, which serves as a shuttle for Downtown Bethlehem.

LANtaBus operates two bus rapid transit, 23 fixed bus routes, eight flex routes, four crosstown and circular routes that operate throughout the Lehigh Valley, and nine routes that operate during the school year for the Allentown School District.

Routes with numbers in the 100s are trunk route and offer the largest operating schedules Monday through Sunday. The 200s routes operate through urban corridors Monday through Saturday during the day. The 300s routes operate mainly in suburban corridors Monday through Friday during the day. The 400s routes are reserved exclusively for the Allentown School District. The 500s routes are reservation-based lines for suburban areas like Macungie. The 600s routes are circulars designed to address the needs of certain markets.

=== List of LANtaBus Routes ===
Route	Name	Terminals		Major streets
EBS Green Line	(formerly 100)	Whitehall	Wind Creek Bethlehem	MacArthur Rd., Union Boulevard
EBS Blue Line	(formerly 101)	Trexlertown	Easton Intermodal Transportation Center	Hamilton Boulevard, Union Boulevard, William Penn Highway
101	Susquehanna St	Parkway Shopping Center	Spillman Loop	Hamilton Street, Susquehanna Street, Broadway, East 4th Street
102	Union Blvd Local	Lehigh Valley Hospital–Cedar Crest	Wind Creek Bethlehem	Hamilton Boulevard, Union Boulevard
103	Catasauqua	Northampton	Lehigh Valley International Airport	MacArthur Rd., Race Street
104	Emmaus	Allentown Transportation Center	Emmaus	Emaus Avenue
105	Hellertown	Lehigh Valley International Airport	Hellertown	Catasaqua Rd., 4th St, Hellertown Road
106	Easton	Van Buren Loop	Forks Plaza	Nazareth Road, Northampton Street
107	Hanover Ave	Village West Shopping Center	Bethlehem Transportation Center	Cedar Crest Boulevard, Tilghman Street, Hanover Avenue
108	Fountain Hill - East Hills	Fountain Hill	Bethlehem Square Shopping Center	Stefko Boulevard, East Boulevard
209	Walbert	Parkway Shopping Center	Lehigh Carbon Community College	Walbert Avenue, Route 309
210	Fullerton	Whitehall Central	South Mall	Fullerton Avenue, Lehigh Street
211	Whitehall	Allentown Transportation Center	Whitehall Zephyr Stadium	15th Street, Fullerton Avenue, MacArthur Road
214	Forks - Nazareth	Easton Intermodal Transportation Center	Nazareth Plaza (Nazareth)	Sullivan Trail, Easton-Nazareth Highway
216	Northampton Street	Greenwood	Easton Intermodal Transportation Center	Northampton Street, Greenwood Avenue, Freemansburg Avenue
217	Slate Belt	Roseto	William Penn Park & Ride	Route 512, Sullivan Tr., Route 33
218	Fogelsville	Fogelsville	Allentown Transportation Center	Tilghman Street
220	NCC	Easton Intermodal Transportation Center	Bethlehem Transportation Center	Freemansburg Ave, Easton Ave
312	Freemansburg	Bethlehem Transportation Center	Bethlehem Square	Freemansburg Avenue, Emrick Boulevard, William Penn Highway
319	Race Street	Allentown Transportation Center	Lehigh Valley International Airport	MacArthur Road, Race Street
322	Hamilton Blvd Local	Cedar Point	Breinigsville	Hamilton Blvd.
323	Center Valley	Center Valley	Southside Station	Center Valley Parkway, Pennsylvania Route 378
324	Airport	Stefko and Broad	Allentown Transportation Center	Airport Road, American Parkway
325	Carbon	Whitehall Zephyr Stadium	Palmerton	Route 329, Route 309, Route 873, Main Street, Route 248
327	Center St. Bethlehem	Bethlehem Square	Bethlehem Transportation Center	Brodhead Road, Center Street
601	Bethlehem Downtown Shuttle	Bethlehem Transportation Center	Bethlehem Transportation Center	Main Street, New Street, Church Street
605	Bethlehem Circulator	Commerce Center Boulevard	Bethlehem Transportation Center	East 4th Street, Market Street
606	South Easton Circulator	Easton Intermodal Transportation Center	Easton Food Market	St. John Street, Line Street, Berwick Street.
613	Breinigsville	Fogelsville Weis	Commercial Center	Industrial Blvd, Cetronia Rd, Hamilton Blvd.

=== List of LANTaFlex Routes ===
Route	Description
501	Macungie-Alburtis Flex
502	Slate Belt-NCC Flex
506	Bath-Hanoverville-Nazareth Flex

=== List of Other Services ===
Route	Description
CT Bus	Carbon Transit routes, which alternate depending on the day of the week
The 400 Routes	School routes for the Allentown School District

== Fleet ==
As of September 12, 2025, the LANta fleet includes 89 buses and 97 vans for revenue service. All the buses are manufactured by Gillig and are either hybrid diesel-electric or use compressed natural gas.
