= Yocco's Hot Dogs =

Restaurant in Pennsylvania

Coordinates: 40.538669°N 75.48356°W

Yocco's
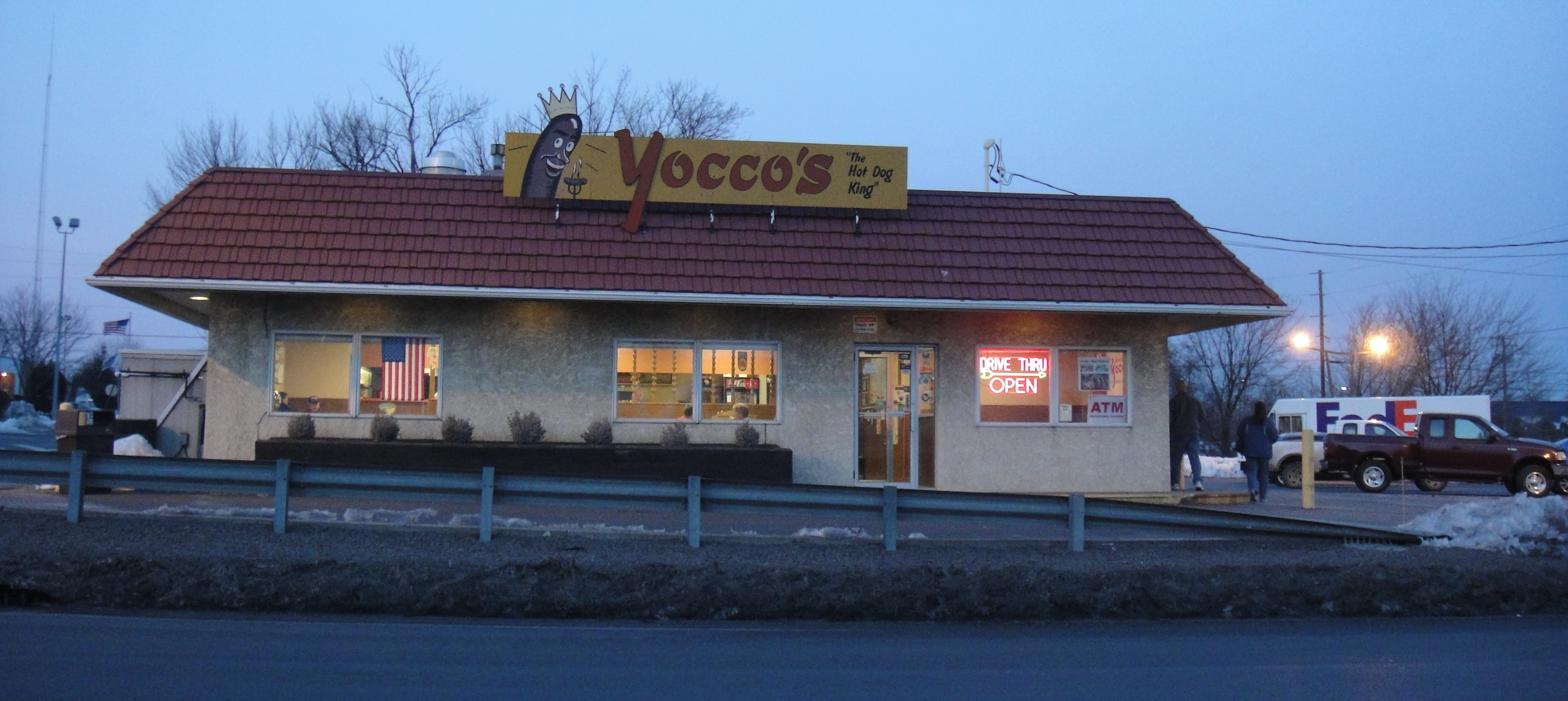
- Yocco's on Pennsylvania Route 100 in Fogelsville, Pennsylvania in March 2014
- Company type: Private
- Industry: Restaurant
- Founded: Allentown, Pennsylvania, U.S. (1922)
- Founder: Theodore Iacocca
- Headquarters: Emmaus, Pennsylvania, U.S.
- Number of locations: 5 stores (2024)
- Area served: Lehigh Valley
- Products: Hot dogs, cheesesteaks, pierogis, french fries, other
- Owner: Gary Iacocca
- Number of employees: 100-299
- Website: yoccos.com

Yocco's Hot Dogs is a hot dog and cheesesteak establishment with five restaurants, each located in the Lehigh Valley region of eastern Pennsylvania, U.S. Yocco's was founded in 1922 by Theodore Iacocca, uncle of Lee Iacocca. Its corporate headquarters is located on East Minor Street in Emmaus.

== History ==
Yocco's was originally established in 1922 at its former location at 625 Liberty Street in the center city section of Allentown. Its original name was the Liberty Grill. The name Yocco's was derived from the name "Iacocca," after the family who owns the establishment. Because the Pennsylvania Dutch could not pronounce Iacocca, an Italian name, and instead pronounced it as Yocco, the name was changed to reflect the pronunciation used in Pennsylvania Dutch.

From the 1970s through the end of the 20th century, Yocco's opened five additional restaurants in Allentown and its suburbs. The first was at 2128 Hamilton Street in Allentown, followed by locations in Emmaus, Fogelsville, Trexlertown, and Hanover Township. Yocco's has made several appearances in Zippy, a nationally syndicated comic strip featuring the character Zippy the Pinhead.

In 2016, the Liberty Street location closed, and a sixth location opened in South Mall in Salisbury Township. The company currently operates five locations in the Lehigh Valley, including three in Allentown, and one each in Emmaus and Fogelsville. In December 2023, the company announced the closure of its Trexlertown store on Facebook.

Yocco's is currently run by Gary Iacocca, the restaurant chain's third-generation owner.

== Current locations ==
- Yocco's Route 100 at 225 PA Route 100 in Fogelsville
- Yocco’s South at 4042 Chestnut Street in Emmaus
- Yocco’s South Mall in South Mall at 3300 Lehigh Street in Allentown
- Yocco's Valley Plaza at 1930 Catasauqua Road in Allentown
- Yocco's West at 2128 Hamilton Street in Allentown
