= Treichlers, Pennsylvania =

Unincorporated community in Pennsylvania, U.S.

Coordinates: 40.734°N 75.544°W

Treichlers is an unincorporated community along the Lehigh River in Lehigh Township in Northampton County, Pennsylvania. The village is part of the Lehigh Valley metropolitan area, which had a population of 861,899 and was the 68th-most populous metropolitan area in the U.S. as of the 2020 census.

The community is located where Route 145 crosses the Lehigh River on its path northward from Allentown to the Lehigh Gap. It was served by the Treichlers post office, which used the ZIP Code of 18086.

The village derives its name from Henry Treichler, who operated a grist mill here in the mid- to late 1800s. It was originally named Kuntzford or Kuntz Ford for the descendants of Bernard Kuntz, one of the township's early settlers, In the 1870s, when a line of the Central Railroad of New Jersey ran by the village, the name was changed to Treichler's Station. The name is pronounced "TRYKE-lerz".
