= Pennsylvania Route 222 =

Highway in Pennsylvania

Pennsylvania Route 222

Route information
- Maintained by PennDOT and City of Allentown
- Length: 4.482 mi (7.213 km)
- Existed: 1991–present

Major junctions
- South end: I-78 / US 222 / PA 309 in Dorneyville
- North end: PA 145 in Allentown

Location
- Country: United States
- State: Pennsylvania
- Counties: Lehigh

Highway system
- Pennsylvania State Route System; Interstate; US; State; Scenic; Legislative
← US 222	→ US 224

Pennsylvania Route 222 (PA 222) is a 4.482 mi (7.213 km)-long state highway located in Allentown and its surrounding suburbs in the Lehigh Valley region in eastern Pennsylvania.

Most of the route runs along Hamilton Boulevard. In Center City Allentown, the route is aligned along West Hamilton, West Linden, and West Walnut Streets. The southern terminus of the route is at Interstate 78 (I-78)/PA 309 in Dorneyville, where the roadway changes designation from PA 222 to U.S. Route 222 (US 222). The northern terminus is PA 145 in Allentown.

Since the city's founding in the 18th century, Hamilton Street was among the first streets constructed in the city and served as the main street in Center City, Allentown. Hamilton Street and Hamilton Boulevard became part of the William Penn Highway in 1916, PA 3 in 1924, and US 22 in 1926. In 1931, US 22 was routed to a new alignment to the north, and Hamilton Boulevard and Hamilton Street west of 15th Street became a part of US 222. In the 1950s, US 222 was rerouted to bypass Allentown, leaving Hamilton Boulevard and Hamilton Street through the city unnumbered.

In 1984, the Pennsylvania Department of Transportation (PennDOT) proposed extending US 222 from I-78/PA 309 to Center City Allentown, where it would end at PA 145. The American Association of State Highway and Transportation Officials (AASHTO) rejected extending US 222 into Allentown, and PA 222 was instead designated to run between I-78/PA 309/US 222 and PA 145 in 1991.

== Route description ==
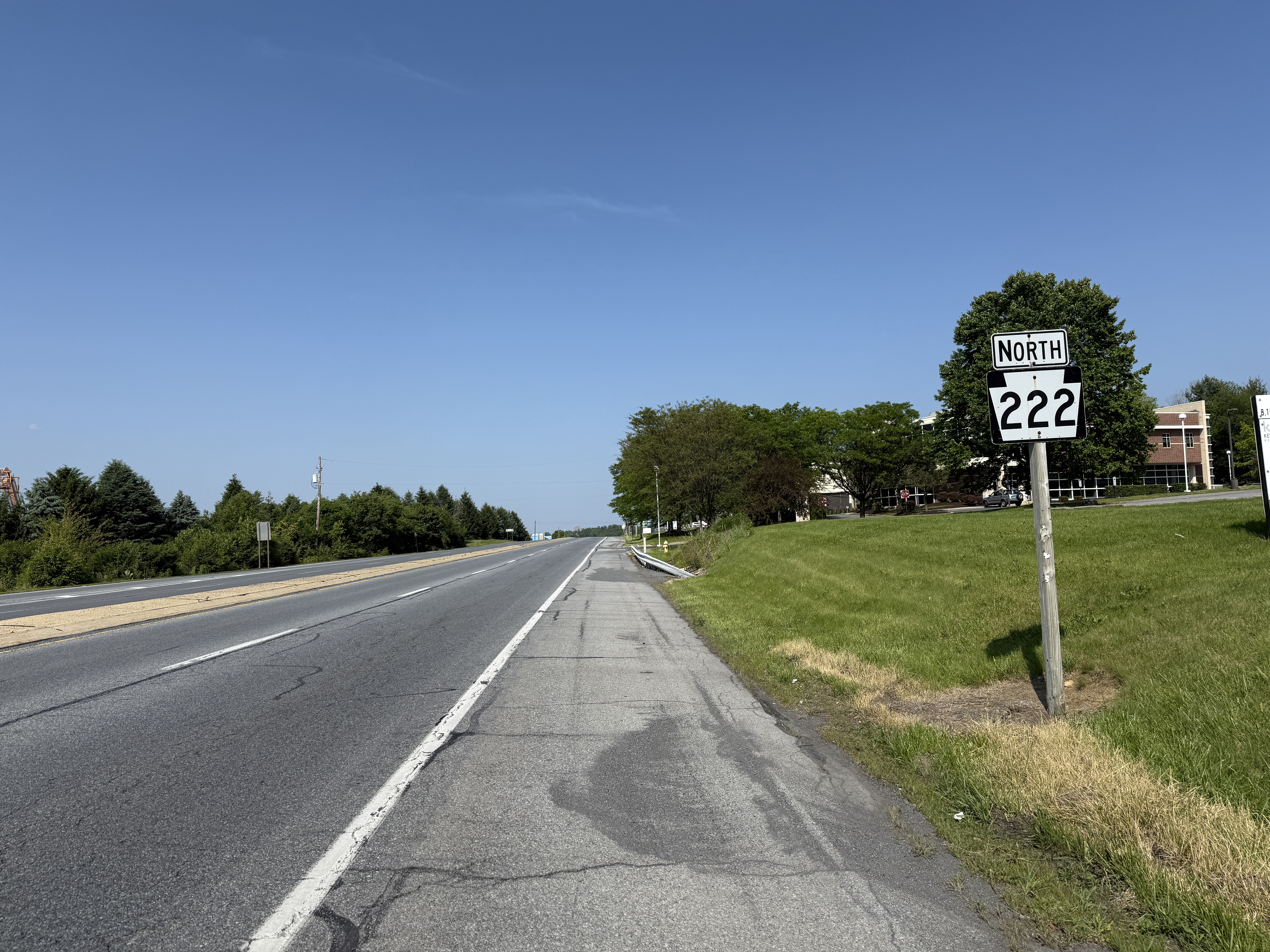
PA 222 North near Dorney Park & Wildwater Kingdom in South Whitehall Township

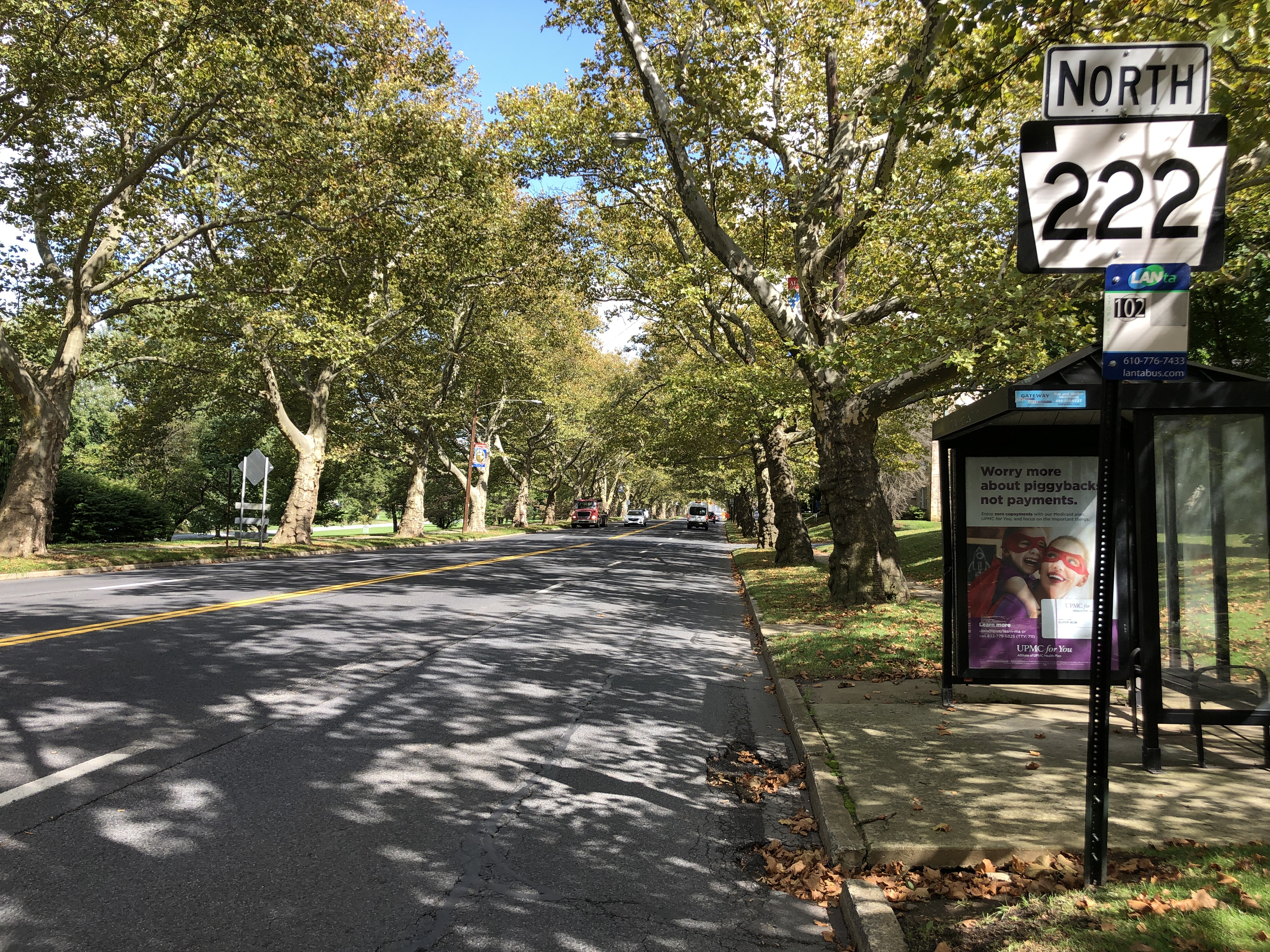
PA 222 North on Hamilton Street in Allentown

PA 222 begins at an interchange with I-78/PA 309 in Dorneyville in South Whitehall Township in Lehigh County, which is in the Lehigh Valley, where the road continues southwest as US 222 toward the city of Reading. From this interchange, PA 222 heads northeast on four-lane divided Hamilton Boulevard. The route comes to an intersection with Lincoln Avenue that has a southbound jughandle; Lincoln Avenue provides access to the main entrance of the Dorney Park & Wildwater Kingdom amusement park. PA 222 passes between Dorney Park & Wildwater Kingdom to the north and businesses to the south. The southbound direction comes to a right-in/right-out with the exit from Dorney Park & Wildwater Kingdom along with the bus entrance to the amusement park. After passing the amusement park, the route splits into two carriageways, with PA 222 north remaining on Hamilton Boulevard and PA 222 south following the newer Hamilton Boulevard Bypass to the north; at the split, there is a pair of median U-turn ramps.

To the east, the road intersects Cedar Crest Boulevard, a major north–south arterial in the Lehigh Valley area. The campus of Cedar Crest College is located at the northeast corner of PA 222 southbound and Cedar Crest Boulevard.

Northeast of Cedar Crest Boulevard, the two carriageways merge onto Hamilton Boulevard, with a U-turn ramp from the northbound direction to the southbound direction at the merge, as it passes to the south of Cedar Crest College. At this point, PA 222 leaves South Whitehall Township for Allentown. The route becomes a four-lane undivided road and passes through residential areas. At the intersection with Ott Street, PA 222 curves east onto Hamilton Street and runs along the southern edge of Cedar Creek Park, where it intersects 24th Street. The road continues east through residential and commercial areas, narrowing to three lanes with two northbound lanes and one southbound lane at the 20th Street intersection. The route passes to the north of St. Luke's Hospital–Allentown Campus between 18th and 17th streets and comes to an intersection with 15th Street.

PA 222 heads into Center City Allentown, where it splits into a one-way pair at 12th Street. Northbound PA 222 turns south onto 12th Street and east onto Walnut Street while southbound PA 222 runs west along Linden Street to 12th Street, following 12th Street south to Hamilton Street. Walnut Street is two lanes and two-way until 10th Street, where it becomes one-way with two northbound lanes heading east, while Linden Street is one way southbound with two lanes heading west. The one-way paring continues east past homes and businesses in the downtown area. Southbound PA 222 passes to the north of the PPL Center sports arena, where the Lehigh Valley Phantoms of the American Hockey League play, between 8th and 7th streets. PA 222 intersects 7th Street, which carries southbound PA 145, before it reaches its northern terminus at 6th Street, which carries northbound PA 145. The Allentown Transportation Center serving LANta buses is located north of Linden Street between 7th and 6th streets.

== History ==
A PA 3 sign from the 1920s

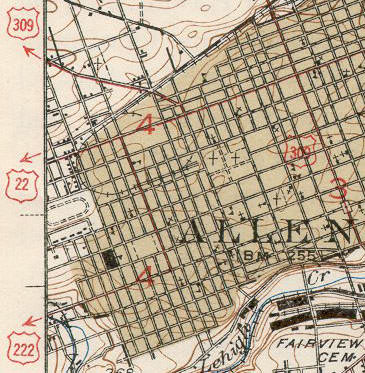
A 1939 USGS map of Allentown, showing U.S. Route 222 and PA 222

From the establishment of Allentown in the 18th century to the modern age, Hamilton Street has been the main arterial of the municipality. Similar to many other Allentown-area streets at the time; Hamilton, Linden, and Walnut Streets were used for trolley car and horse transportation.

=== 20th century ===
Following an economic depression in the late 19th century, Allentown rebounded briefly in the early 20th century, establishing many shopping stores along Hamilton Street, the commercial center of the city, which hosted the annual Workhorse Parade, was a popular attraction in the 1910s.

When the Sproul Road Bill's adoption on May 31, 1911, the state began maintenance over state highways. One of those highways was Legislative Route 157, the modern Hamilton Boulevard section of PA 222, west of Allentown. Another state highway was Legislative Route 159, aligned east of Allentown to downtown Bethlehem along Hanover Avenue and Broad Street. No routes had a designation within Allentown.

In 1916, the William Penn Highway was organized as an alternative to the Lincoln Highway. The roadway traversed Center City Allentown via Hamilton Street and Hamilton Boulevard. The Pennsylvania Department of Highways gave the road the PA 3 numbering in 1924 and when the United States Highway System was formed, US 22 became part of it. The William Penn Highway served New York City; the road became problematic for motorists in Lebanon along the current US 422; Reading via current US 422 and US 222; and Allentown on Hamilton Street. PA 43 was aligned as a bypass, north of the Pennsylvania Dutch Country, between Allentown and Harrisburg.

On June 8, 1931, the American Association of State Highway Officials came to a resolution to the traffic problem, by replacing the PA 43 corridor with US 22 and the William Penn Highway name to match. The state truncated PA 43 to Susquehanna Street from Allentown to Bethlehem. US 222 replaced the former US 22 alignment from Reading to Allentown. Hamilton Street was numbered as US 222, west of Center City Allentown, where it turned north onto 15th Street. This portion of US 222 was seven-blocks long which ended at Tilghman Street (then US 22). Signs were changed to reflect the new designations on May 31, 1932, with the new route designations officially in place on June 1, 1932.

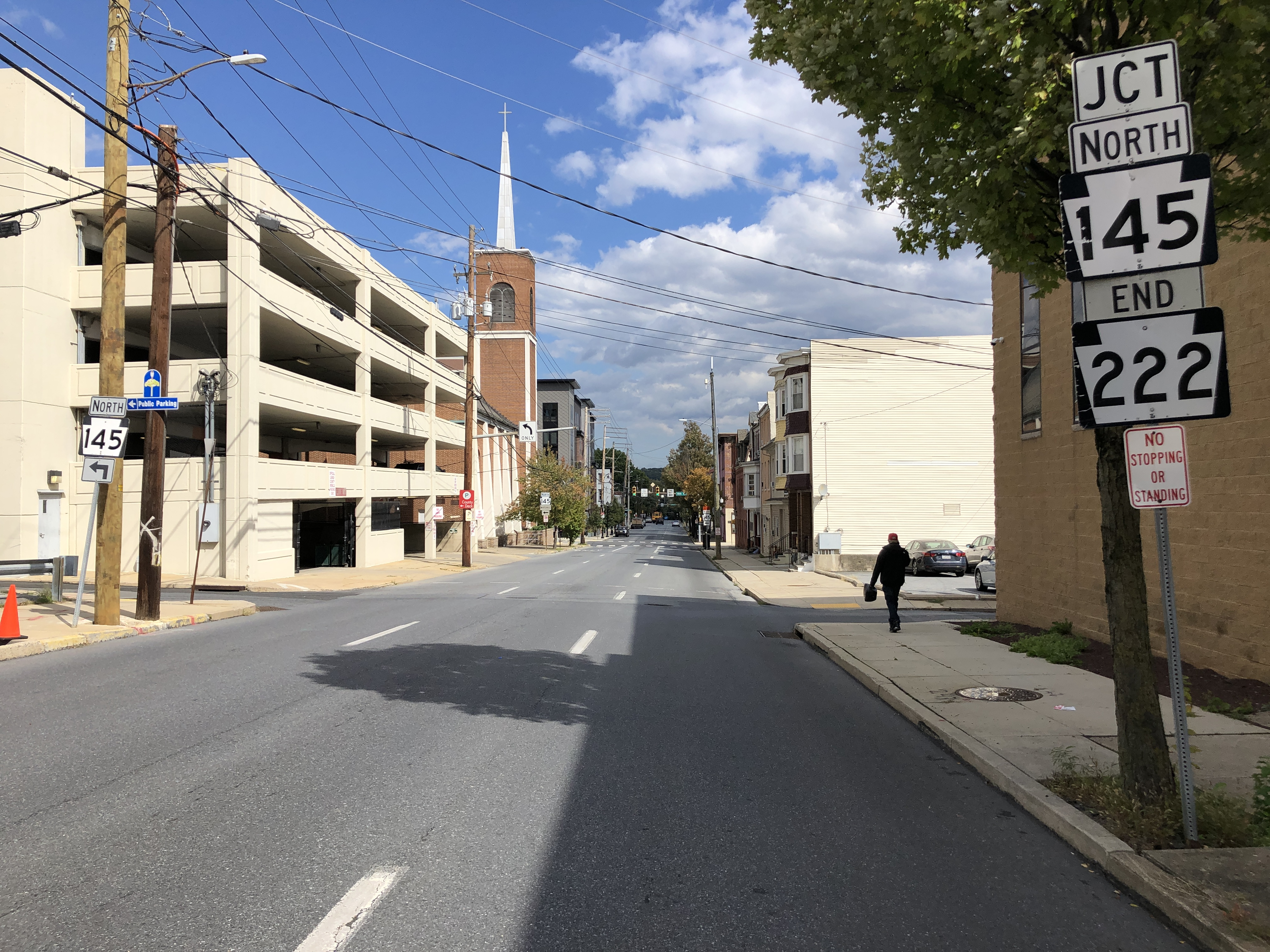
PA 222 North approaching its terminus at PA 145 North in Allentown

In the late 1950s, US 222 was realigned to a newly constructed bypass carrying US 309 and PA 29, west of Allentown. From the south, US 222 left Hamilton Boulevard and turned north onto the freeway. US 222 terminated at an interchange with US 22, US 309, and PA 29 in South Whitehall Township. By 1970, what was the US 309/PA 29/US 222 freeway had the PA 29 designation removed, US 309 downgraded to PA 309 and US 222 was truncated to end at its current northern terminus. By the 1980s, I-78 became part of the freeway that occupied PA 309.

In 1984, PennDOT was planning to extend PA 145 and US 222. Traffic engineer Samuel D. Darrohn said that Allentown is one of few Pennsylvania cities without a traffic route going through it. After the plan was introduced, he said that motorists might be aided if US 222 is extended along Hamilton Boulevard to connect with the proposed PA 145 corridor. PennDOT originally planned the road as US 222 but AASHTO denied the extension, stating that the route "is not the shortest or best available route between major control points on the system, and therefore, does not adhere to the policies established under AASHTO's 'Purpose and Policy Statement for U.S. Numbered Highways'". In addition, the route did not meet the criteria for a business route. In 1991, it was commissioned as PA 222. PA 145 was extended south of the US 22 freeway to the I-78/PA 309 overlap near Lanark.

== Major intersections ==
The entire route is in Lehigh County.

Location	mi	km	Destinations	Notes
Lower Macungie–South Whitehall township line	0.000	0.000	I-78 / PA 309 – Harrisburg, Tamaqua, Bethlehem, Quakertown US 222 south (Hamilton Boulevard) – Kutztown, Reading	Exit 54 (I-78/PA 309); southern terminus; northern terminus of US 222; to I-476
Allentown	4.342	6.988	PA 145 south (7th Street) – Quakertown	
Allentown	4.482	7.213	PA 145 north (6th Street) – Whitehall	Northern terminus
1.000 mi = 1.609 km; 1.000 km = 0.621 mi
