= Pennsylvania Route 145 =

State highway in Pennsylvania, US

Pennsylvania Route 145
- Battle of the Bulge Veterans Memorial Highway

Route information
- Maintained by PennDOT and City of Allentown
- Length: 20.887 mi (33.614 km)
- Existed: 1928–present

Major junctions
- South end: PA 309 in Upper Saucon Township
- PA 222 in Allentown; US 22 in Whitehall Township; PA 329 in Whitehall Township
- North end: PA 248 in Lehigh Gap

Location
- Country: United States
- State: Pennsylvania
- Counties: Lehigh, Northampton

Highway system
- Pennsylvania State Route System; Interstate; US; State; Scenic; Legislative
← PA 144	→ PA 146

Pennsylvania Route 145 (PA 145) is a 20.89 mi (33.62 km) long north–south state highway in the Lehigh Valley area of eastern Pennsylvania. It connects PA 309 in Lanark, Lehigh County, north to PA 248 in Lehigh Gap, Northampton County.

PA 145 is the main north–south arterial into Allentown, the third-largest city in the state. The route enters the city on South 4th Street and follows multiple streets to Center City Allentown, where it follows the one-way pair of 6th Street northbound and 7th Street southbound. North of Allentown in Whitehall Township, a seven-mile (11.2 km) portion of PA 145 is known as MacArthur Road, named in honor of General Douglas MacArthur. MacArthur Road is a divided highway; between U.S. Route 22 (US 22) and Eberhart Road, it is six lanes wide with a Jersey barrier and jughandles while the remainder of the road a four-lane divided highway. MacArthur Road is the location of the main commercial center of the Lehigh Valley. North of Eagle Point, PA 145 becomes a two-lane undivided road that parallels the Lehigh River, crossing the river into Northampton County at Treichlers. The route continues along the east bank of the river and passes through Walnutport before reaching its northern terminus. PA 145 is dedicated as the Battle of the Bulge Veterans Memorial Highway in honor of the veterans who fought in the Battle of the Bulge in World War II.

The section of road south of Center City Allentown was originally designated as part of US 309 when the U.S. Highway System was established in 1926. Between 1928 and 1930, PA 312 ran concurrent with US 309 on this stretch of road. PA 145 was first designated in 1928 between intersections with PA 45 (now PA 248) in Weiders Crossing and Bath, heading south to Cementon before turning east to Bath. A portion of PA 329 was designated between Cementon and Allentown along Coplay Road, Mickley Pike, and 7th Street, ending at US 22, US 309, PA 29, and PA 43 at 7th and Hamilton streets.

The Seventh Street Pike was built between the 1920s and 1941 as a straight north–south road in Whitehall Township; PA 329 was relocated onto it in the 1930s. In 1941, PA 145 and PA 329 switched alignments, with PA 145 heading south along Seventh Street Pike and 7th Street to US 22/US 309/PA 29 at Tilghman Street in Allentown and PA 329 heading east to Bath. Seventh Street Pike was renamed to MacArthur Road in the early 1950s. In the 1950s, the southern terminus of PA 145 was cut back to the US 22 freeway in Whitehall Township and US 309 and PA 29 were rerouted to bypass Allentown. The MacArthur Road section of PA 145 was widened into a divided highway in 1970. In the 1980s, a proposal was made to extend PA 145 and US 222 through Allentown to provide numbered routes in the city. PA 145 was extended south to its current terminus in 1986.

== Route description ==
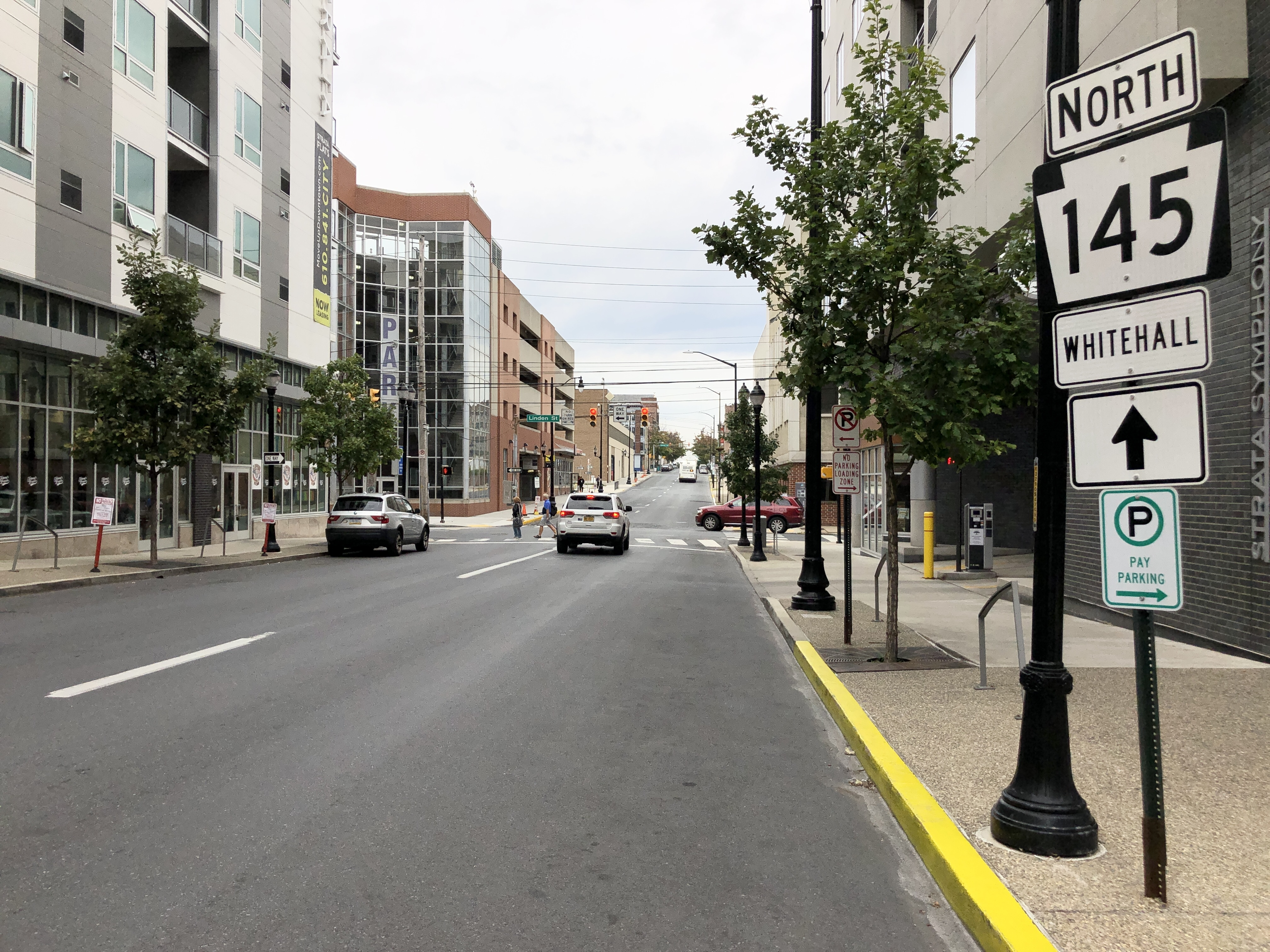
PA 145 northbound approaching PA 222 southbound in Allentown

Diagram of the interchange at PA 145's southern terminus

PA 145 begins at an interchange with PA 309 in the community of Lanark in Upper Saucon Township, Lehigh County, which is in the Lehigh Valley. South of this interchange, the roadway continues southeast as part of PA 309 while northbound PA 309 heads west along I-78. From this interchange, PA 145 heads northwest on Pike Avenue, a divided highway with two northbound lanes and one southbound lane. The road becomes undivided at the Vera Cruz Road/Oakhurst Drive intersection and ascends South Mountain with S-curves, passing through forested areas with some homes. The route reaches the community of Summit Lawn at the peak of South Mountain, where it intersects Rock Road, which heads southwest to provide access to westbound I-78/northbound PA 309. Here, PA 145 turns north and enters Salisbury Township, where it descends the mountain with one northbound lane and two southbound lanes through forests with a few residences. At the base of South Mountain, the route heads into the city of Allentown and becomes South 4th Street, heading into residential areas. The road crosses Emaus Avenue and narrows to two lanes, running north-northwest past businesses as it heads into the Mountainville neighborhood. PA 145 continues past homes and businesses, curving to the north as it passes to the east of a shopping center. After passing through the Mountainville neighborhood, the route turns west onto Susquehanna Street and passes over Norfolk Southern's Reading Line and Trout Creek.

PA 145 curves north and becomes South 5th Street before it splits into a one-way pair. The northbound direction follows South 5th Street north and Auburn Street west to an intersection with South 6th Street and Lehigh Street while the southbound direction follows South 6th Street south and Wyoming Street east. The one-way streets, which carry two lanes of traffic in each direction, pass through urban residential neighborhoods, with northbound PA 145 passing Good Shepherd Hospital along South 5th Street. Past the one-way pair, the route follows Lehigh Street, a three-lane road with one northbound lane and two southbound lanes, through urban residential and commercial areas, crossing Little Lehigh Creek before intersecting Martin Luther King, Jr. Drive. After this intersection, the road ascends a long hill. PA 145 splits into another one-way pair at Union Street, with the northbound direction following two-lane South 6th Street and the southbound direction following three-lane South 7th Street. The route heads into commercial Center City Allentown, intersecting the northern terminus of northbound PA 222 at West Walnut Street, which is one-way eastbound. A block later, PA 145 intersects West Hamilton Street, with the Soldiers and Sailors Monument located at the center of the intersection between 7th and Hamilton streets. Past this intersection, northbound PA 145 follows North 6th Street and southbound PA 145 follows North 7th Street, with southbound PA 145 passing to the east of the PPL Center sports arena, where the Lehigh Valley Phantoms of the American Hockey League play. Past the arena, the route intersects West Linden Street, which is one-way westbound and serves as the southbound beginning of PA 222. The Allentown Transportation Center serving LANta buses is located between 6th and 7th streets north of Linden Street. Continuing north, PA 145 leaves Center City Allentown and passes through urban areas of homes and businesses, intersecting Tilghman Street. A short distance later, northbound PA 145 turns west on two-way, two-lane West Washington Street to rejoin southbound PA 145 at North 7th Street.

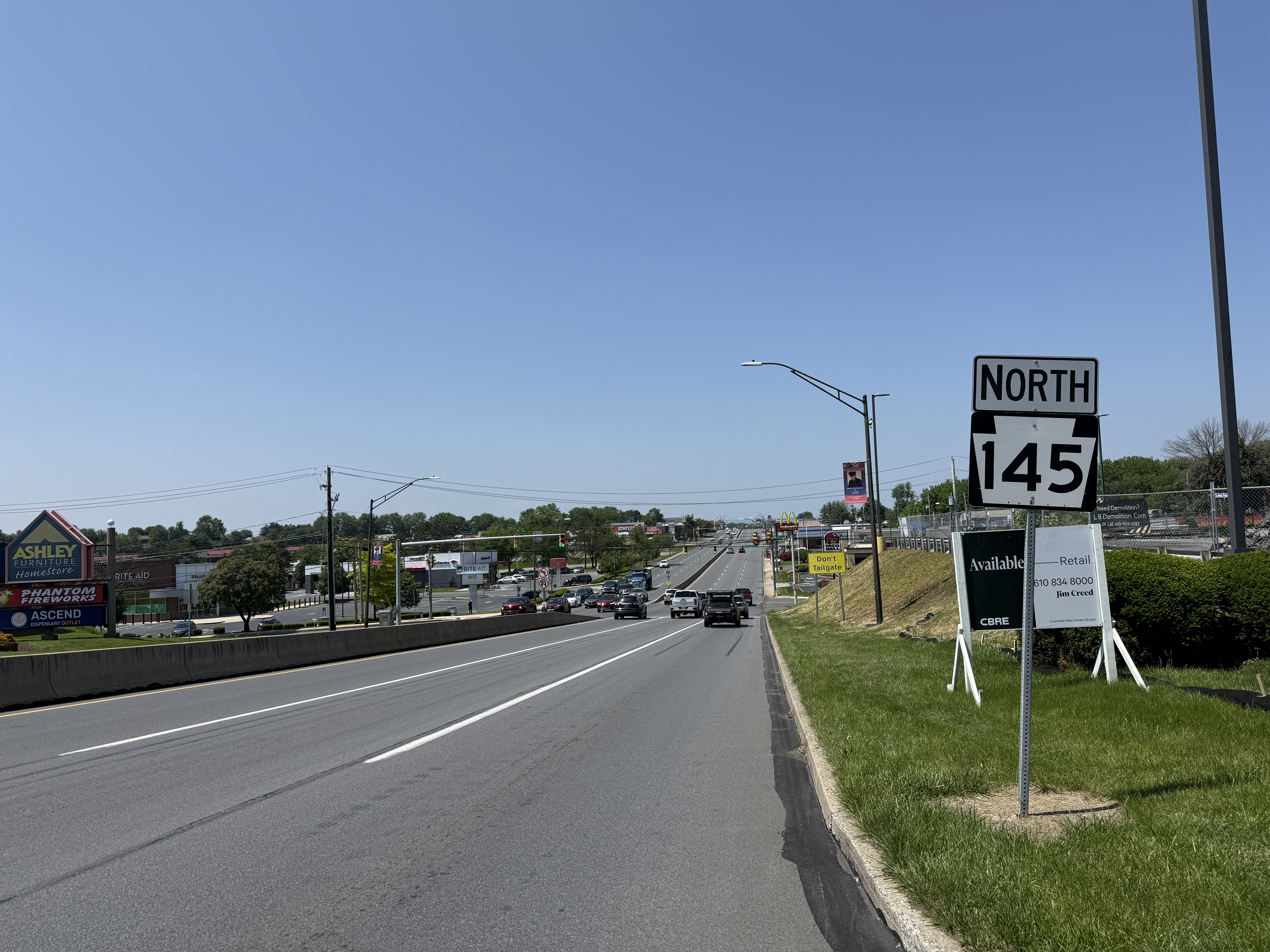
PA 145 northbound on MacArthur Road in Whitehall Township

PA 145 continues north on North 7th Street, a three-lane road with one northbound lane and two southbound lanes that is lined with urban homes. The route widens to four lanes and crosses over Sumner Avenue on a bridge, at which point it leaves Allentown for Whitehall Township. Here, the route becomes four-lane divided MacArthur Road and intersects Mickley Road/6th Street as it heads into commercial areas. The road crosses Jordan Creek and passes between businesses to the west and residential areas to the east before it comes to an interchange with the US 22 freeway. Past this interchange, PA 145 becomes a six-lane divided highway with a Jersey barrier and several intersections controlled by jughandles. The route traverses the main commercial center of the Lehigh Valley, passing to the west of Lehigh Valley Mall. After intersecting Grape Street, the road heads to the west of Whitehall Mall before coming to another intersection with Mickley Road. PA 145 continues past shopping centers and businesses, intersecting Schadt Avenue and curving to the northwest.

After the Eberhart Road intersection in the community of Mickleys, the road narrows to a four-lane divided highway and runs through a mix of farmland and commercial development, turning to the north. The route continues through wooded areas with some nearby farms and residential commercial development, crossing Coplay Creek. The road reaches an intersection with PA 329 in Eagle Point, located east of Egypt and west of the borough of Northampton. Past this intersection, PA 145 continues north through rural areas with some development, crossing into North Whitehall Township. The route intersects Second Street and narrows to a two-lane undivided, unnamed road as it heads along the west bank of the Lehigh River. The road continues through wooded areas alongside the river before it curves northwest away from it and reaches the community of Laurys Station. PA 145 passes homes and businesses, curving to the north again. The route heads into farmland with some homes, turning to the west and widening into a four-lane divided highway.

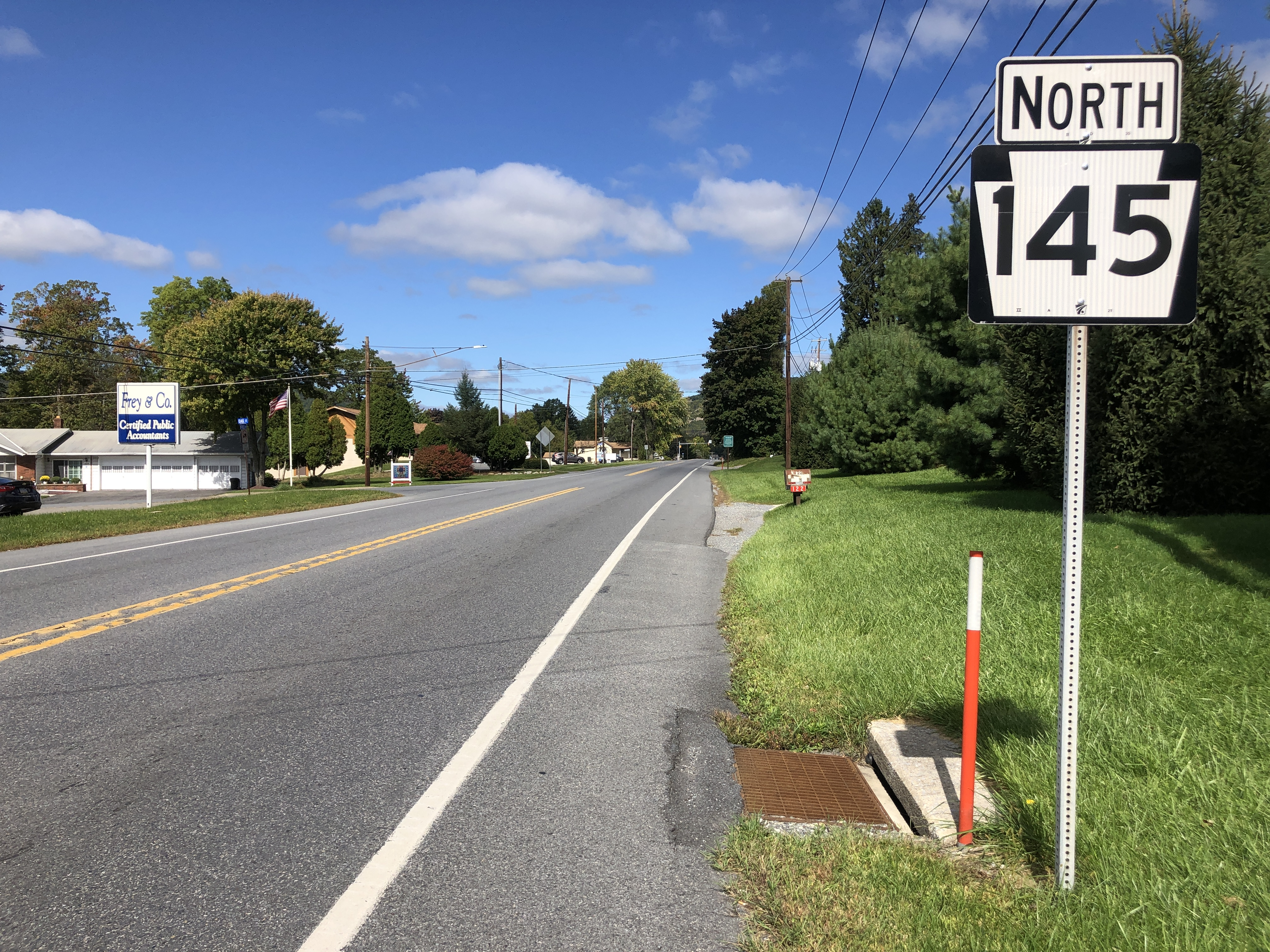
PA 145 northbound in Walnutport

PA 145 crosses over the D&L Trail and the Lehigh River on the Treichlers Bridge, at which point it enters Lehigh Township in Northampton County. The route passes over Norfolk Southern's Lehigh Line before it descends off the Treichlers Bridge and intersects Blue Mountain Drive in the community of Treichlers. Past this, PA 145 heads south on two-lane undivided Riverview Drive and passes through a mix of farms and homes to the west of the river and the railroad tracks. The road begins a long curve to the west and then to the northwest as it continues parallel to the Lehigh River, heading into wooded areas with some development. The route passes through the community of Lockport and runs west through a mix of farms and woods before it enters the borough of Walnutport. PA 145 curves north and becomes South Best Avenue, heading through residential areas with some businesses. The route heads into commercial areas, briefly becoming a divided highway before intersecting Main Street, where the name changes to North Best Avenue. The road becomes undivided again and continues into wooded areas with some development. The route leaves Walnutport for Lehigh Township again, where the name changes back to Riverview Drive. PA 145 continues north and reaches its northern terminus at PA 248 in the community of Weiders Crossing, a short distance south of the northern terminus of PA 873 at PA 248 and the Lehigh Gap in Blue Mountain. At the northern terminus, the route also encounters the Appalachian Trail.

== History ==
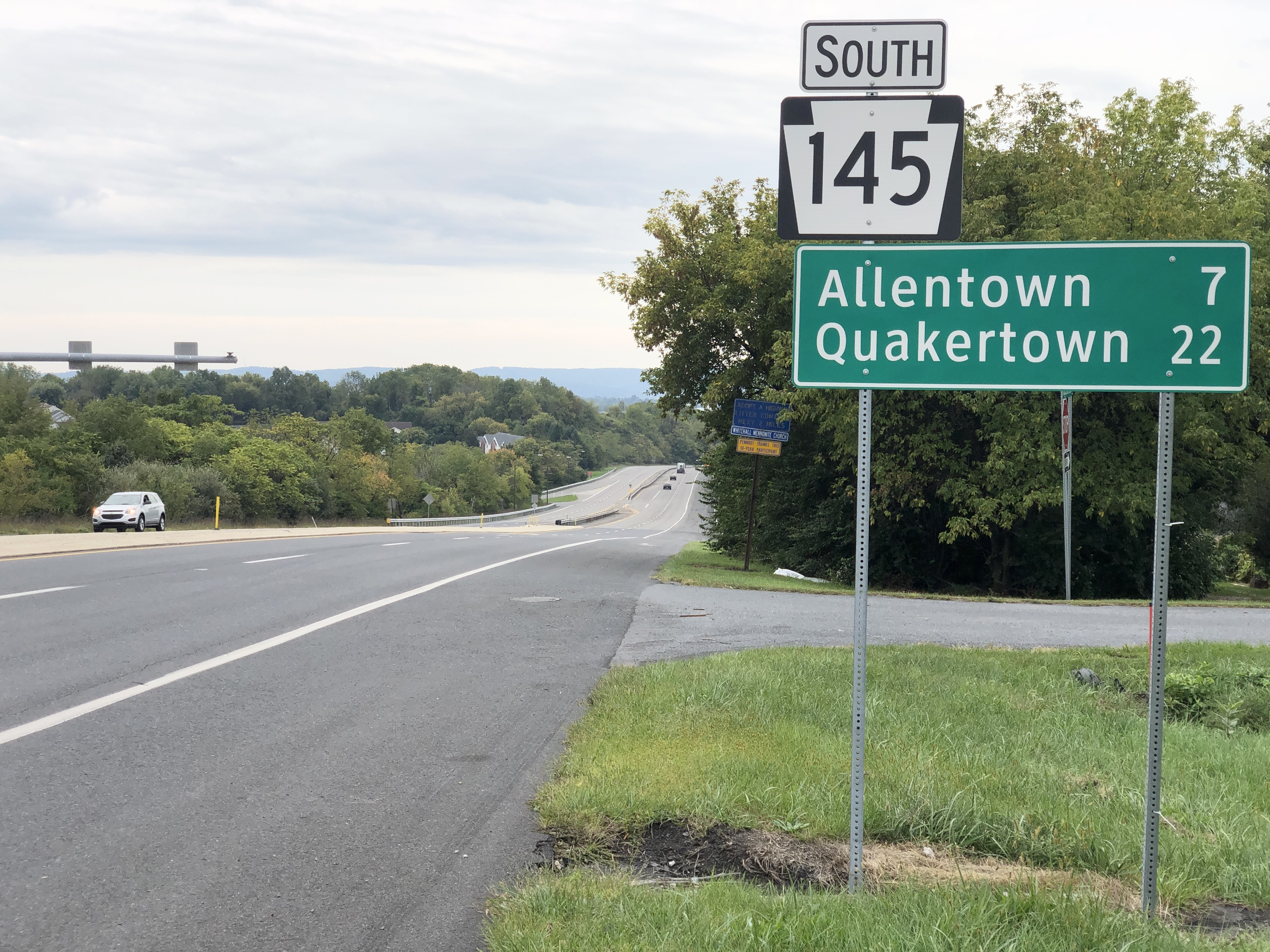
PA 145 southbound past PA 329 in Whitehall Township

When routes were first legislated in Pennsylvania following the passage of the Sproul Road Bill in 1911, the present-day PA 145 corridor was legislated as part of Legislative Route 153 south of Allentown and as Legislative Route 175 in Northampton County. With the creation of the U.S. Highway System in 1926, the present-day route heading south out of Allentown was designated as part of US 309. In 1928, PA 312 was designated concurrent with US 309 between Center Valley and Allentown. The concurrent PA 312 designation was removed from US 309 by 1930. US 309 entered Allentown from the south on Jordan Street (now South 4th Street) and intersected PA 43 at Susquehanna Street, at which point it turned west to join PA 43. US 309/PA 43 curved north on 5th Street and turned west on Auburn Street to intersect PA 29 at Lehigh Street. From here, US 309/PA 29/PA 43 continued north along Lehigh Street, Union Street, and 7th Street to the center of Allentown.

PA 145 was first designated in 1928 to run from PA 45 (now PA 248) in Weiders Crossing east to PA 45 (now PA 248) in Bath, heading south along its current alignment and continuing along the river to Cementon, where it turned east and passed through Northampton before continuing to Bath. When first designated, the route was paved between Treichlers and Bath. By 1930, the entire length of PA 145 was paved. The road between Cementon and Allentown was designated by 1930 as part of PA 329. This route followed Coplay Road from Cementon to Coplay and then ran along Mickley Pike through Whitehall Township before entering Allentown on 7th Street, where it ended at US 22, US 309, PA 29, and PA 43 at the intersection of 7th and Hamilton streets. In the 1930s, PA 329 was realigned to follow Seventh Street Pike (now MacArthur Road) through Whitehall Township. The Seventh Street Pike was built starting in the later part of the 1920s to provide a straight north–south road in Whitehall Township. The road between Allentown and Mickleys church was widened to three lanes in the 1930s. The southern terminus of PA 329 was cut back to US 22, US 309, and PA 29 at Tilghman Street in Allentown in the 1930s, with US 309/PA 29 replacing the route along 7th Street between Tilghman and Hamilton streets. The concurrent PA 43 designation was also removed from US 309. In 1941, PA 145 was realigned to follow Seventh Street Pike south from Eagle Point to Allentown and 7th Street in Allentown to US 22/US 309/PA 29 at 7th and Tilghman streets in Allentown, with PA 329 realigned to follow the former alignment of PA 145 between Cementon and Bath. The section of Seventh Street Pike between Center Street and Eagle Point was constructed as a concrete road in 1941. The portion of PA 145 along Seventh Street Pike was widened to four lanes between Allentown and west of Coplay by 1947. In the early 1950s, Seventh Street Pike was renamed to MacArthur Road in honor of General Douglas MacArthur, a World War II hero.

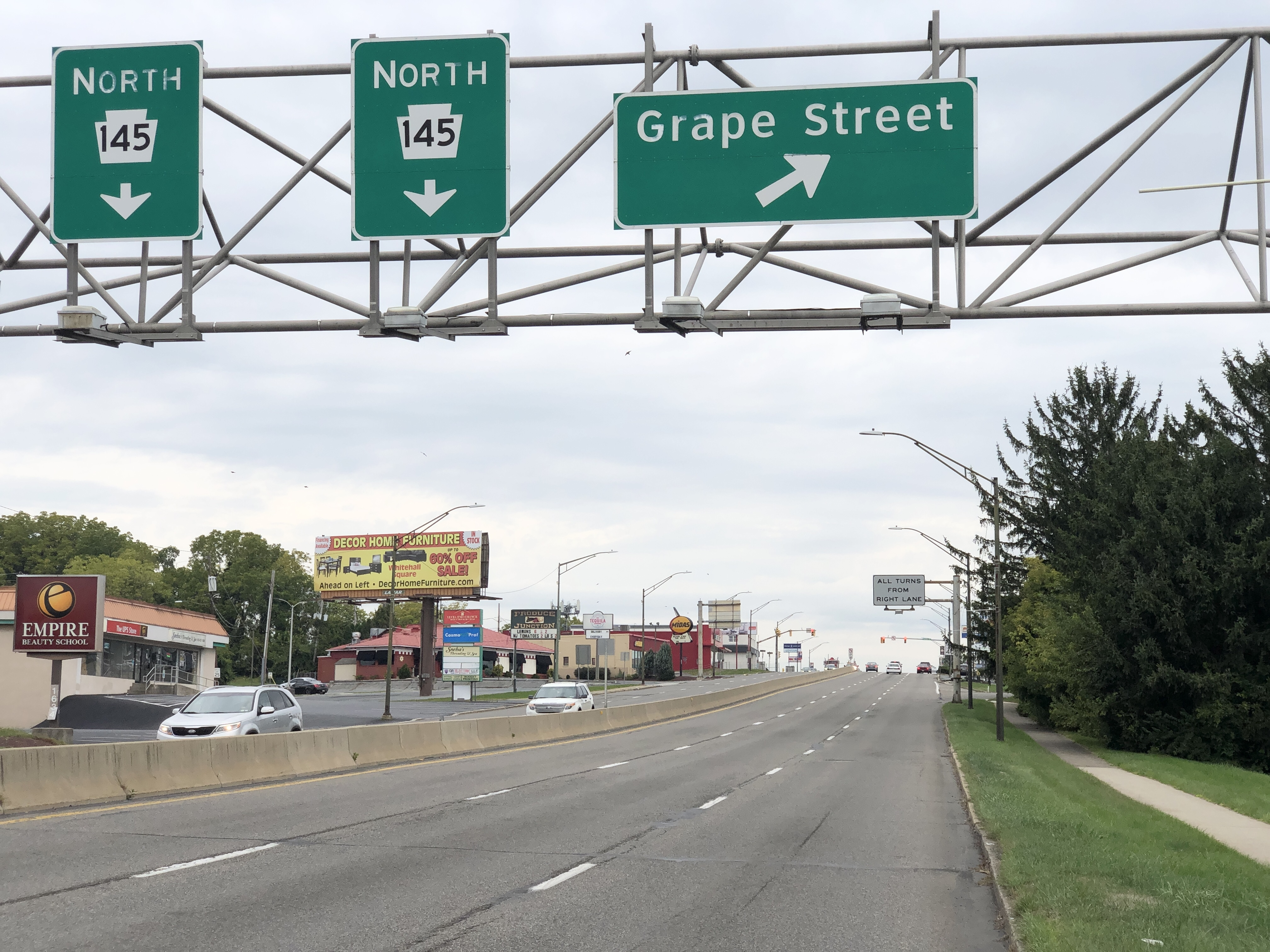
PA 145 northbound approaching Grape Street in Whitehall Township

Following the completion of the US 22 freeway in 1955, the southern terminus of PA 145 was cut back to the cloverleaf interchange with I-78/US 22 in Whitehall Township. Also, US 309 and PA 29 were rerouted to bypass Allentown to the south and west in the 1950s, leaving the former alignment unnumbered. By 1961, PA 145 was realigned to bypass the center of Walnutport to the east along Best Avenue, having previously passed through the borough on Washington Street, Main Street, Cherry Street, and Spruce Street. By 1970, PA 145 was widened into a divided highway between US 22 and north of PA 329; the portion between US 22 and Eberhart Road was constructed as a six-lane divided highway in 1969. The section of the route in Whitehall Township developed into a major retail center for the Lehigh Valley in the second half of the 20th century, with the construction of several businesses along with the Whitehall Mall and the Lehigh Valley Mall. In 1984, PennDOT proposed to extend PA 145 to I-78 and PA 309 in Lanark. Traffic engineer Samuel D. Darrohn said that Allentown was one of few Pennsylvania cities without a traffic route going through it. He supported his idea by saying that motorists also might be aided if US 222 was extended along Hamilton Boulevard to connect with the proposed PA 145 corridor. In 1986, the extension of PA 145 south from US 22 to I-78/PA 309 along its current alignment was completed. PA 145 was dedicated as the Battle of the Bulge Veterans Memorial Highway in 2008 in honor of the veterans who fought in the Battle of the Bulge during World War II. In 2012, a project began to improve PA 145's interchange with US 22. The project reconstructed the bridge carrying PA 145 over US 22 and replaced the cloverleaf interchange with a modified diamond interchange to improve traffic flow. The reconstruction project, which cost $13.8 million, was planned to be finished in December 2013.

== Major intersections ==
County	Location	mi	km	Destinations	Notes
Lehigh	Upper Saucon Township	0.000	0.000	PA 309 south – Quakertown	Southern terminus
Lehigh	Upper Saucon Township	0.842	1.355	To I-78 west / PA 309 north – Harrisburg, Tamaqua	Access via Rock Road
Lehigh	Allentown	4.293	6.909	PA 222 south (Linden Street) – Reading	Northern terminus of PA 222
Lehigh	Whitehall Township	6.039	9.719	US 22 (Lehigh Valley Thruway) – Harrisburg, Bethlehem	Interchange
Lehigh	Whitehall Township	10.619	17.090	PA 329 (Main Street) – Egypt, Northampton	
Northampton	Lehigh Township	20.887	33.614	PA 248 (Lehigh Drive) – Palmerton, Lehighton, Easton	Northern terminus
1.000 mi = 1.609 km; 1.000 km = 0.621 mi
