= South Mall =

Shopping mall in Allentown, Pennsylvania, U.S.

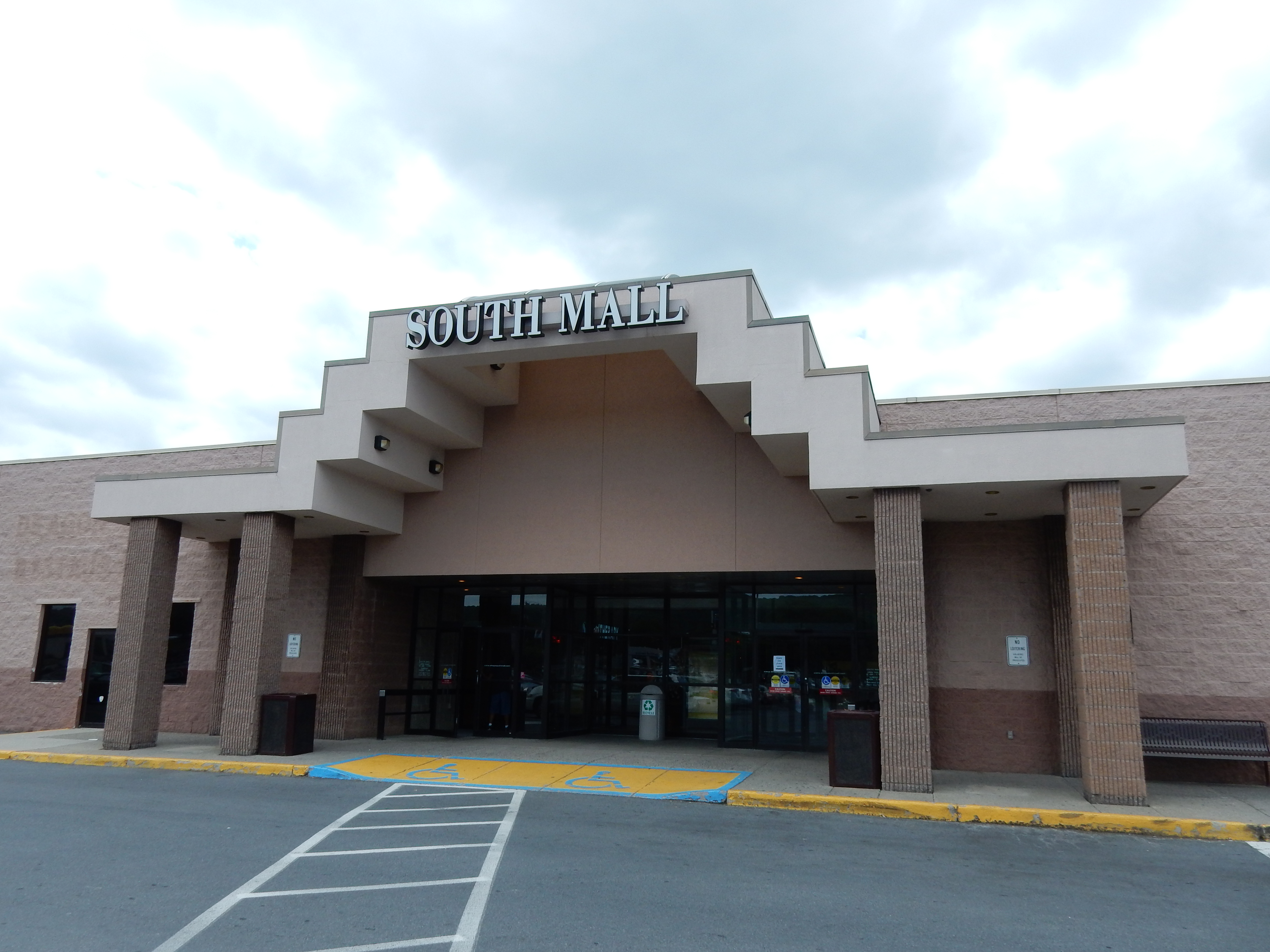
- South Mall's main entrance in June 2015
- Location: Salisbury Township, Lehigh County, Pennsylvania, U.S.
- Address: 3300 Lehigh St., Allentown, Pennsylvania, 18103, U.S.
- Opened: 1975; 51 years ago
- Developer: Hess's
- Owner: Nicholas Park Mall LLC (The James Balliet Property Group)
- Num. of stores: 30
- Num. of anchor tenants: 4
- Floor area: 405,199 sq ft (37,600 m^{2})
- Floors: 1
- Parking: Parking lot
- Public transit: LANta bus: 104, 210, 423
- Website: shopsouthmall.com

South Mall is an enclosed shopping mall located on Lehigh Street in Salisbury Township, Pennsylvania. The mall is just south of Interstate 78's exit 57 near Allentown's southern border with Emmaus in the Lehigh Valley region of eastern Pennsylvania.

== History ==
=== 20th century ===
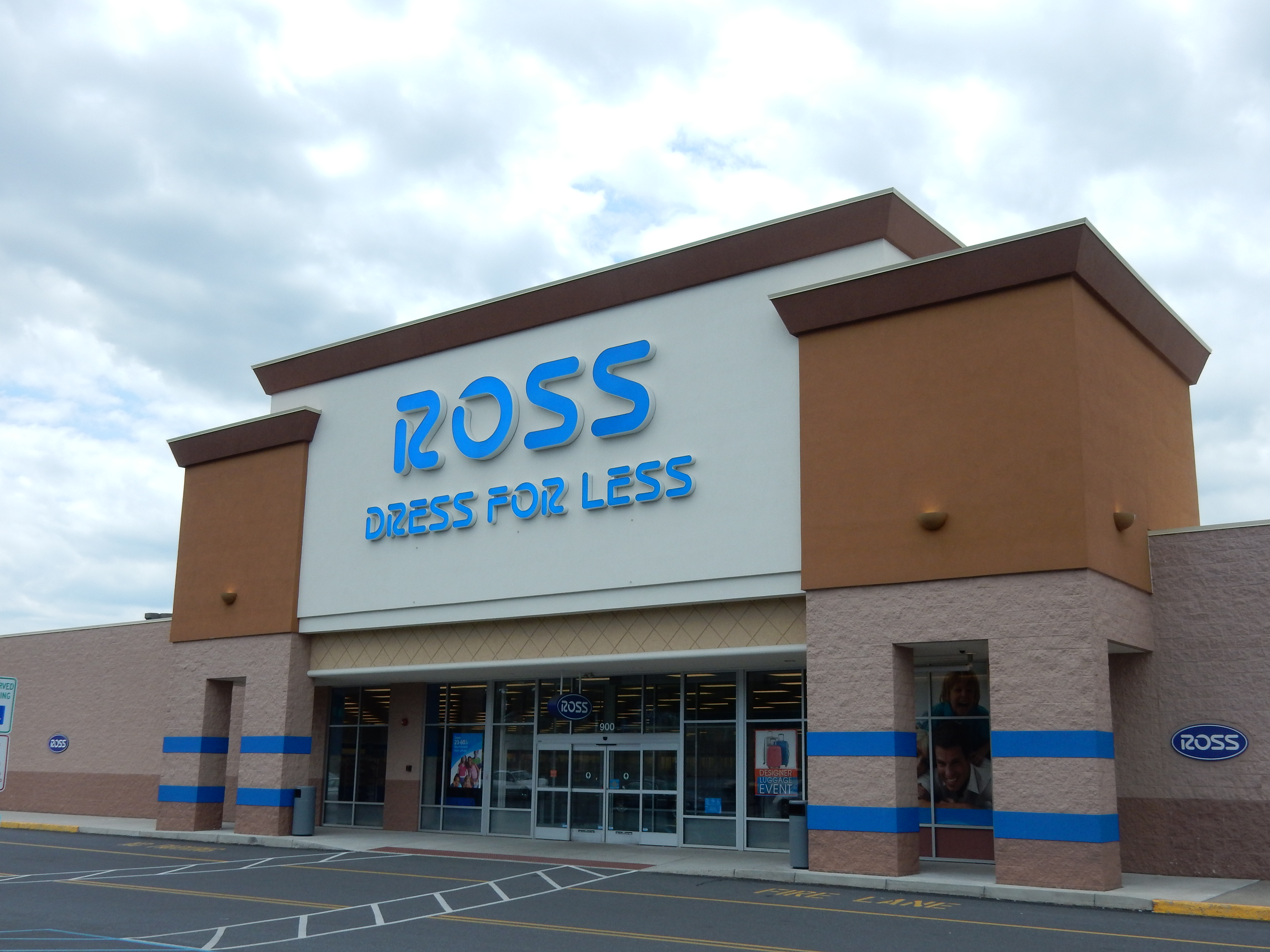
Ross Stores at South Mall in June 2015

Hess's South, an early satellite location of the Hess's downtown Allentown department store, opened at the site of the mall in 1971. Hess's built a modest enclosed mall on the north side of the department store in 1975, adding a Weis Markets location and several specialty shops.

In 1979, Hess's, which developed and owned South Mall and operated its largest tenant, was bought by Crown American, a Johnstown-based commercial real estate company, and the transaction included South Mall. Crown American doubled the size of South Mall in a 1986-1987 expansion that added a new section of enclosed mall on the southern side of Hess's South. In November 1986, discount retailer Jamesway opened its 100th store at the South Mall to anchor the new expansion, and celebrated the milestone with skydivers landing in the South Mall parking lot. In 1991, the mall expanded yet again, adding discount drugstore Phar-Mor as its third major anchor in the newer portion of the mall.

In 1991, the older portion of the mall on the north side of Hess's was deactivated following closure of Rea & Derick, a drugstore that was acquired by CVS Pharmacy.

In late 1995, Jamesway closed its South Mall location when the chain filed bankruptcy. A year later, Stein Mart leased a majority of the space previously occupied by Jamesway. Stein Mart's South Mall location represented its first store in Pennsylvania. The remainder of the former Jamesway was subdivided between Gold's Gym and Home & Gifts, before being replaced by Ross Stores in 2012.

In 1996, five years after deactivating the north side of Hess's following the departure of Rea & Derick, the north side of the mall again opened, replaced by Staples Inc. and Petco.

In 1999, Weis Markets closed its South Mall store amid poor sales. The space once occupied by Weis Markets has since been subdivided into space for three newer South Mall stores, Mattress Firm, Blick Art Materials, and a Pennsylvania wine and spirits store.

=== 21st century ===
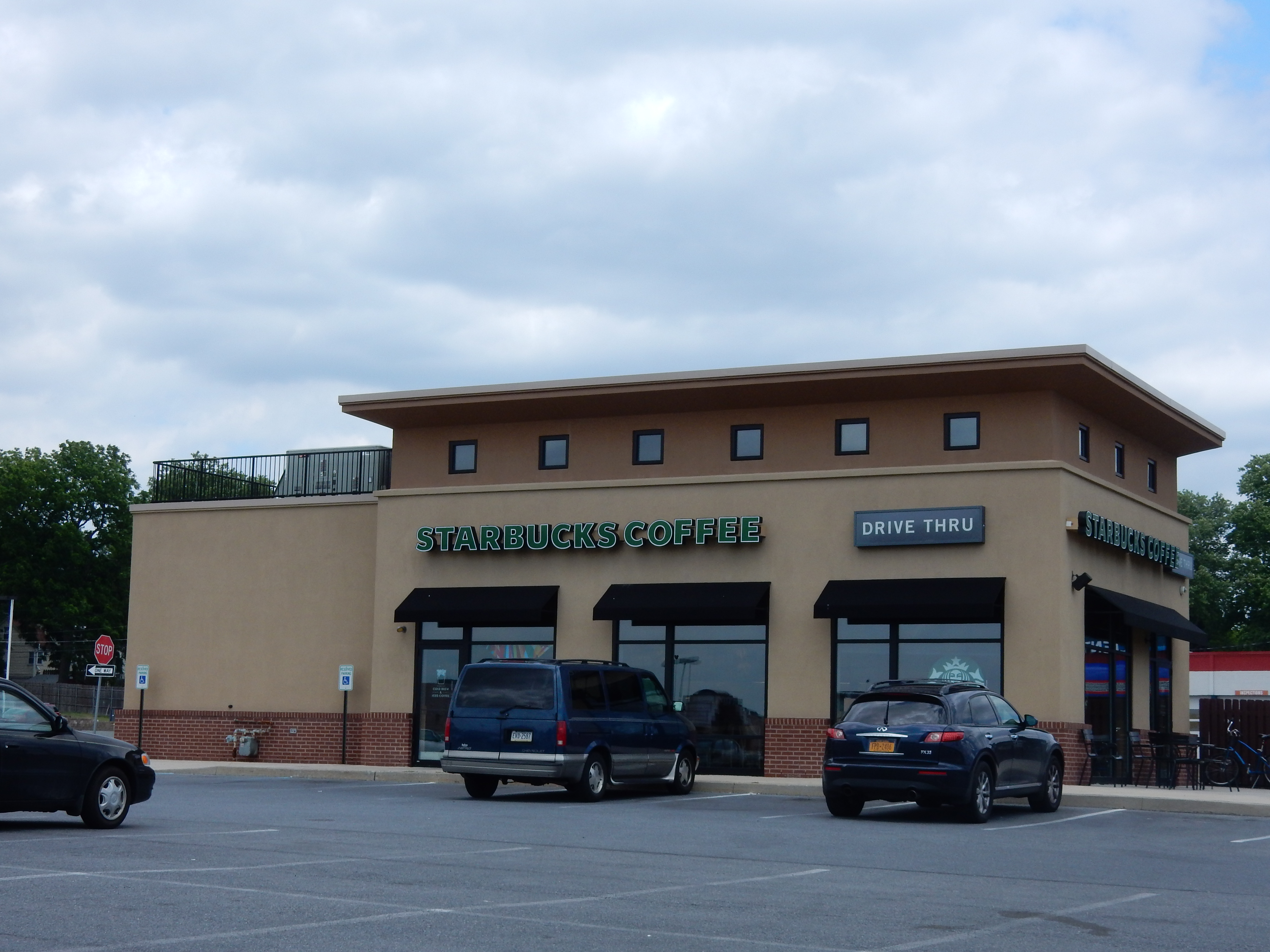
The Starbucks at South Mall

In 2002, Phar-Mor closed its anchor store at South Mall as part of the chain's national acquisition by CVS. This was replaced by Steve & Barry's, a retail clothing chain.

In 2003, Crown American was purchased by PREIT, a real estate investment trust, in a $1.2 billion acquisition.

In 2008, Steve & Barry's, another South Mall tenant, declared bankruptcy and closed its South Mall and other locations. The anchor space Steve & Barry's occupied at South Mall was leased the following year, in 2009, to Black Rose Antiques and Collectibles, an antique mini-mall with over 100 individual dealers. After Black Rose Antiques closed, the space was then sold to a gym which operates as out of the space under the name Supersets Gym.

In June 2014, PREIT sold South Mall for $23.6 million to Nicholas Park Mall LLC, a company formed by seven New York area investors led by former Macy's executive Richard Krantz, after South Mall was deemed two years earlier to be one of over a dozen underperforming PREIT-owned malls.

In 2016, Yocco's Hot Dogs, a regionally famous Emmaus-headquartered hot dog and cheesesteak restaurant chain with four Lehigh Valley locations, opened a restaurant in South Mall.

In January 2017, Black Rose Antiques relocated its South Mall location to Phillipsburg Mall in nearby Phillipsburg, New Jersey. In early 2017, the anchor space Black Rose Antiques previously occupied at South Mall was subdivided with Limerick Furniture occupying most of it. The remainder of the space was revamped to accommodate Full Circle Training, a gymnasium that opened in early 2018.

In 2018, The Bon-Ton, which had acquired Hess's in the 1990s and represented the oldest and largest South Mall anchor, closed all of its national store locations, including its South Mall location. In 2019, Limerick Furniture also closed, leaving South Mall with Stein Mart as its sole remaining major anchor tenant.

Throughout the early 2020s, South Mall has sponsored and hosted community events, including periodic flea markets and weekly summer food truck events. Nontraditional tenants, such as Cave Brewing Co., a full-service craft beer bar with live entertainment, and South Mall Mercantile antiques dealer, have been brought in to fill the voids left by tenants that have departed. However, both of these have since closed.

In 2020, the last anchor of South Mall, Stein Mart announced it would be closing all of its store locations including its South Mall location. In April 2021, the franchised T-Mobile store near the mall entrance closed permanently. The corporate-owned store across from it (which was a Sprint store until its merger with T-Mobile in 2020) and Metro by T-Mobile store, however, remain open. Another store, called Uniquely Lo. Co., has opened a South Mall store. In May 2021, Claire’s closed its South Mall location. Spirit Halloween began occupying the former Stein Mart location in 2022.

On November 14, 2023, The Giant Company announced that in 2025, the Bon-Ton store would be demolished and the Giant food store on W. Emaus Ave. would move into a new 68,000-square-foot location on the former Bon-Ton space. In November 2024, Burlington agreed to lease 19,972 square feet of the Spirit Halloween building, which would be subdivided between smaller tenants, starting in late summer 2025. Burlington opened November 1, 2025, followed by Giant on November 21.

== Anchors ==
Major tenants

- Giant (2025)
- SuperSets Gym (2022)
- Burlington (2025)
- Ross Stores (2012)

Minor tenants

- A1 Japanese Steakhouse
- Blick Art Materials
- Mattress Firm (2016)
- Petco (1996)
- Staples (1993)

== Former anchors ==
Major tenants

- Black Rose Antiques & Collectibles (2009–16; replaced by Full Circle Training and Limerick Furniture)
- The Bon-Ton (1994-2018; replaced by Giant)
- Full Circle Training (2018–20; replaced by SuperSets Gym)
- Habitat for Humanity ReStore (2022–24)
- Hess's South (1971–94; replaced by The Bon-Ton)
- Jamesway (1986–95; replaced by Stein Mart, Gold's Gym, and Home & Gifts)
- Limerick Furniture & Mattress (2017–19; replaced by Habitat for Humanity)
- Phar-Mor (1991-2002; replaced by Steve & Barry's)
- Spirit Halloween (2022–24; replaced by Burlington)
- Stein Mart (1996–2020; replaced by Spirit Halloween)
- Steve & Barry's (2003–09; replaced by Black Rose Antiques & Collectibles)
- Weis Markets (1975–99; divided between Sleepy's, Blick Art Materials, and A1 Japanese Steakhouse)

Minor tenants

- Rea & Derick (1975–91; became part of Petco)
- Sleepy's (became Mattress Firm)
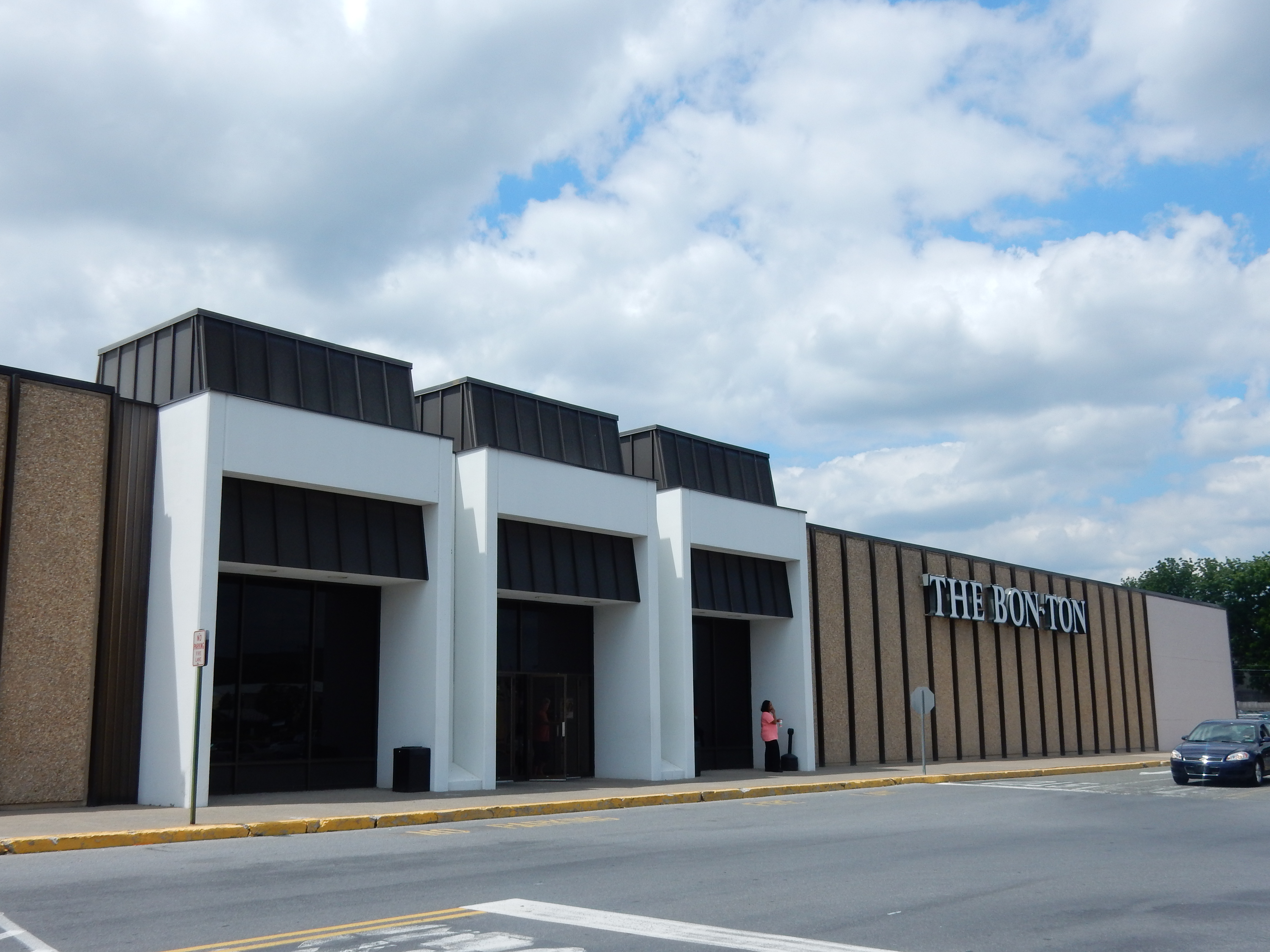
Former Bon-Ton

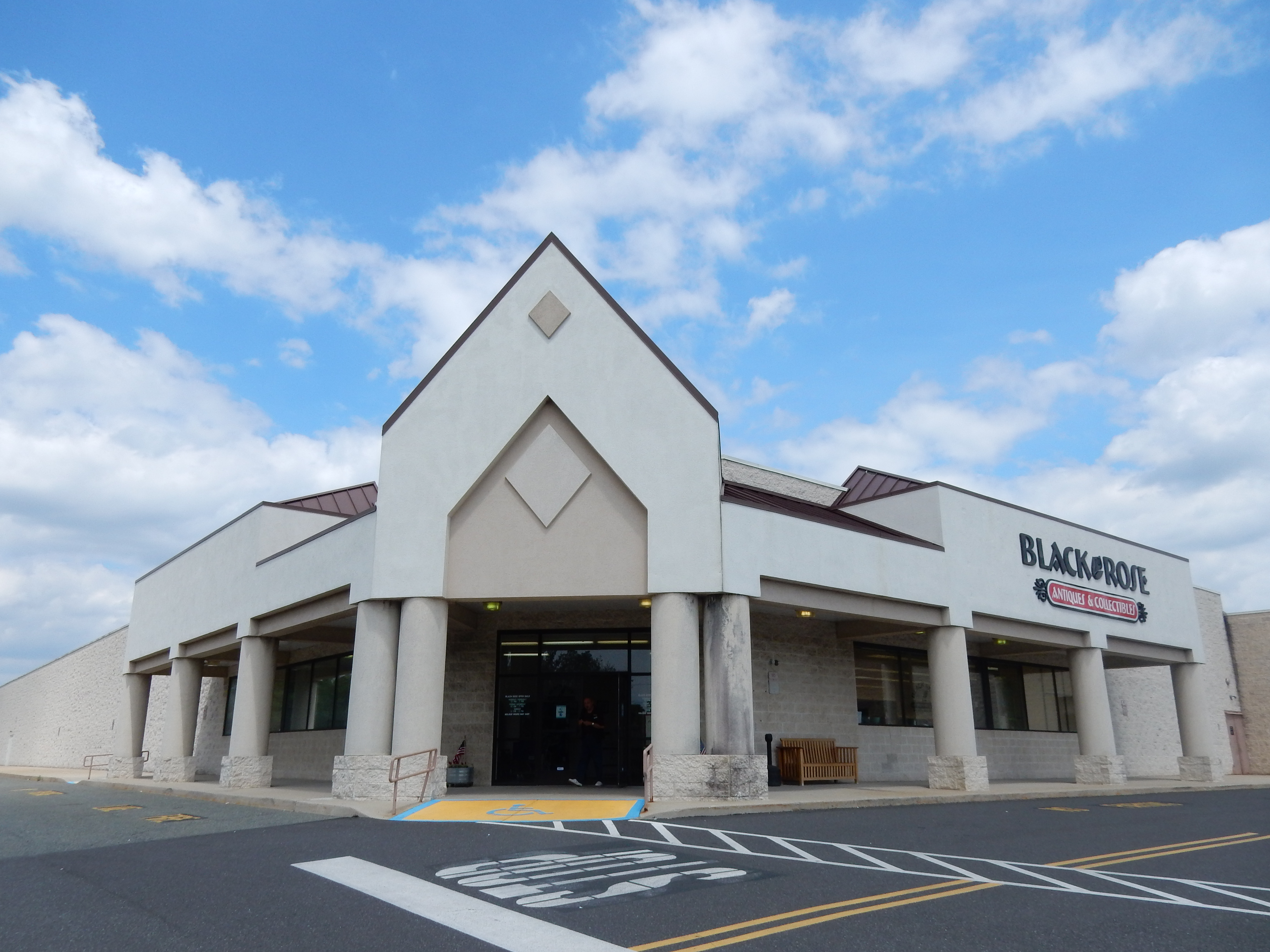
Former Black Rose

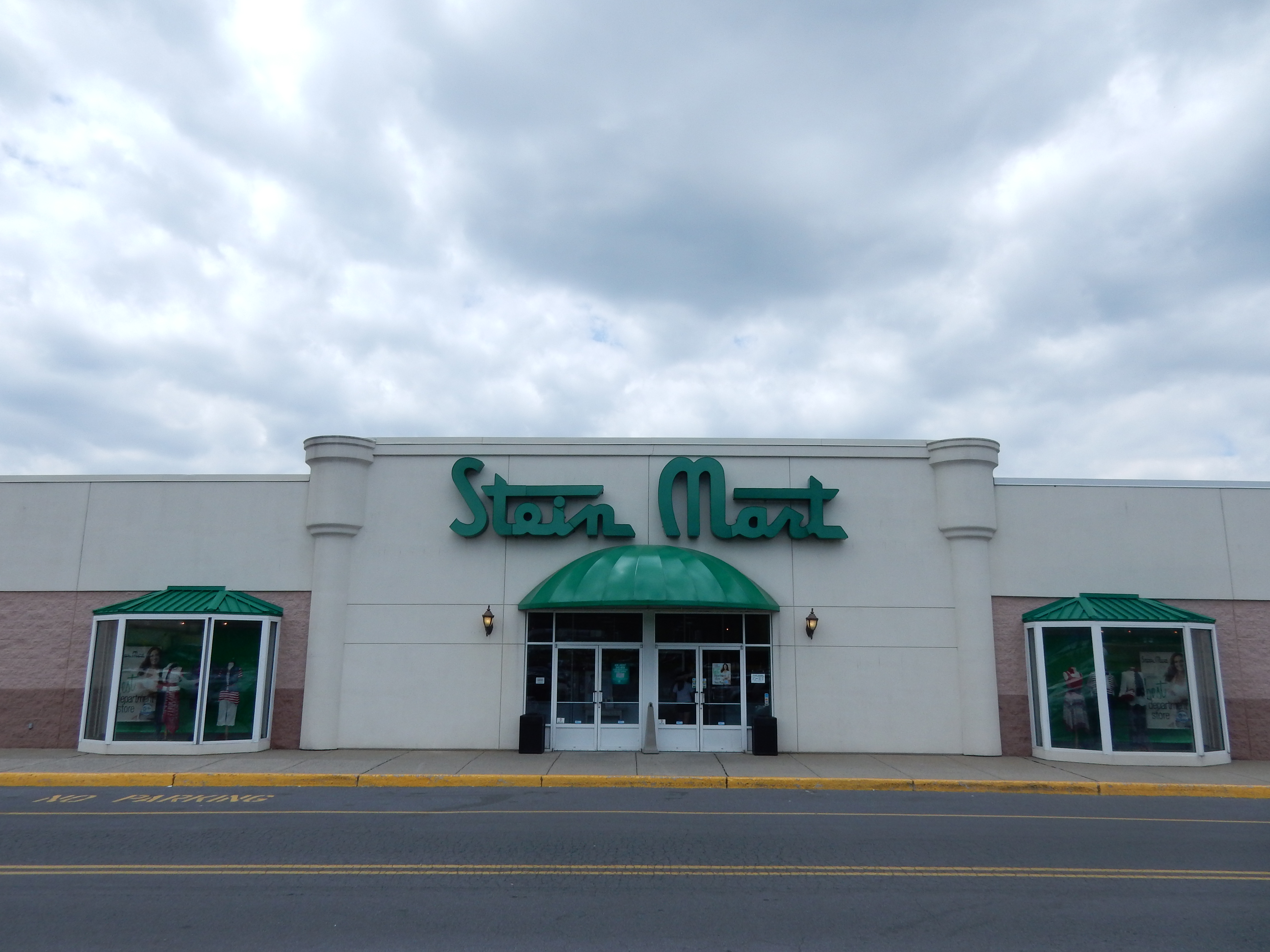
Former Stein Mart
