= Easton Intermodal Transportation Center =

Bus terminal in Pennsylvania, United States

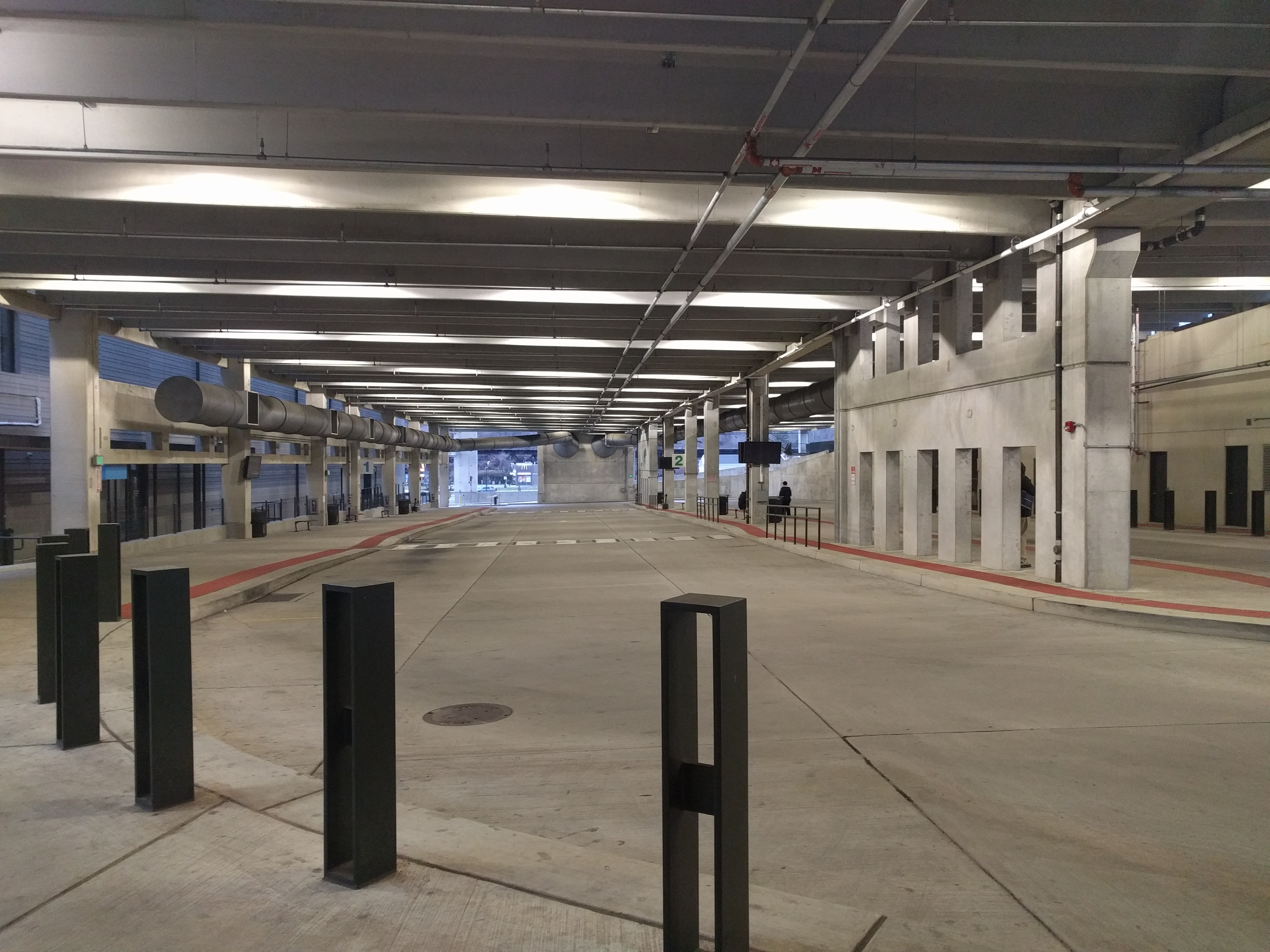
- The intercity bay in 2020

General information
- Location: 123 South 3rd Street; Easton, Pennsylvania; United States
- Coordinates: 40°41′20″N 75°12′33″W
- Owner: City of Easton
- Bus stands: 2 platforms
- Bus operators: Fullington Trailways; Greyhound Lines; LANta; NJ Transit; Trans-Bridge Lines

Construction
- Architect: Spillman Farmer Architects

Other information
- Website: Fred A. Williams Easton Intermodal Transportation Center

History
- Opened: October 5, 2015
Location

The Fred A. Williams Easton Intermodal Transportation Center is a bus terminal in downtown Easton, Pennsylvania. It serves as a hub for local routes in the Lehigh Valley area operated by LANta and for intercity routes operated by various companies. In addition to buses, the center hosts Easton's city hall and a restaurant. The center opened in 2015.

== Description ==
The center consists of two structures. Facing South 3rd Street is a 45,000-square-foot (4,200 m^{2}) rectangular three-story building containing Easton's city hall, a waiting room and ticket office for bus passengers, and retail. Behind this building, are the bus bays and a multilevel parking garage above.

== History ==
Prior to the opening of the center, LANta's local buses used Easton's Center Square as its downtown hub. This was an open-air location with considerable traffic. The Lehigh Valley Surface Transportation Plan 2011-2030, published in 2010, identified a need for dedicated transit centers in Allentown, Bethlehem, and Easton. Intercity buses stopped at a location on South 3rd Street between Center Square and Ferry Street, north of the new facility.

The site in Easton, bounded on the north by Spruce Street and the east by South 3rd Street, was formerly occupied by two properties: a Perkins Restaurant & Bakery, and the shuttered Marquis Theatre. The city acquired both in 2010 for a total of $3 million. The entire cost of the project came to $34 million, split between the city of Easton, LANTA, and state and federal grants.

The center was dedicated on September 29 and opened on October 5, 2015. It is formally named the Fred A. Williams Easton Intermodal Transportation Center, after Fred A. Williams, a local businessman and long-time member of LANta's board. The city hall relocated from the Alpha Building on the southwest side of Centre Square on October 26.

== Services ==
The Easton Intermodal Transportation Center hosts local and intercity bus services:

- LANta: local routes to various destinations in Easton, Allentown, Bethlehem, and Nazareth.
- Trans-Bridge Lines: regular commuter bus service to the Port Authority Bus Terminal in New York City.
- Fullington Trailways: a daily round-trip between Williamsport, Pennsylvania and New York City.
- Greyhound Lines: a daily round-trip between Scranton, Pennsylvania and Philadelphia.
- Delaware River Coach operates NJ Transit routes across the Delaware River to Phillipsburg and Pohatcong Township, New Jersey.
