= Lehigh Gap =

Water gap cut by the Lehigh River through Blue Mountain in Pennsylvania

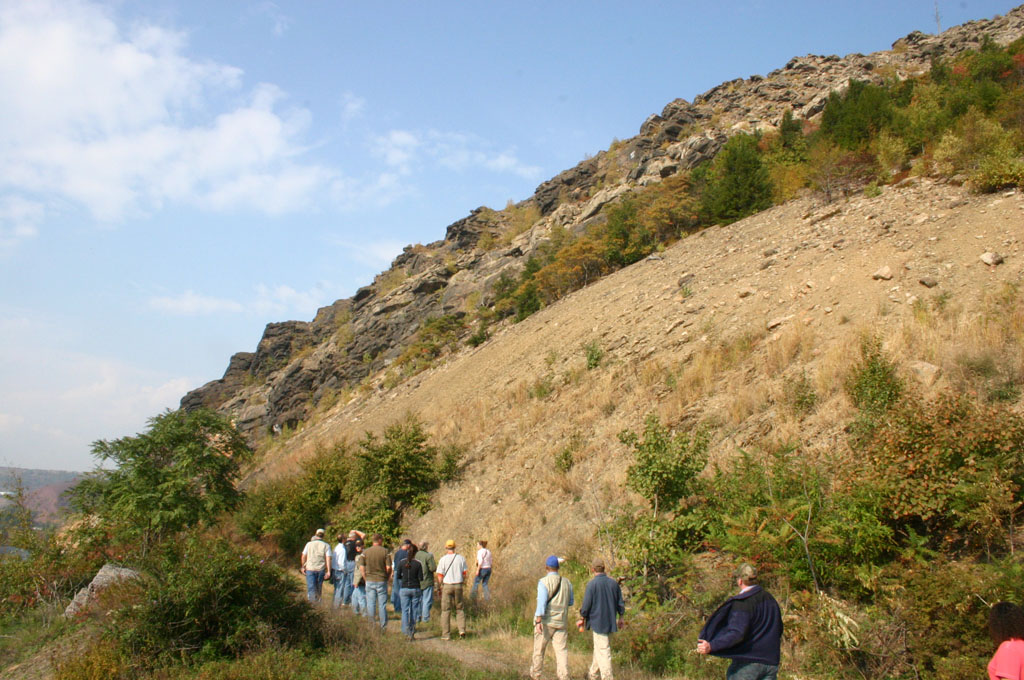
- The Shawangunk Formation at Lehigh Gap in October 2008
- Interactive map of Lehigh Gap
- Coordinates: 40°46′36″N 75°36′30″W
- Region: Lehigh Valley
- State: Pennsylvania
- Country: United States

The Lehigh Gap or Lehigh Water Gap is a water gap located in the townships of Lehigh, Washington, Lower Towamensing, and East Penn in the Lehigh Valley and Coal Region regions of eastern Pennsylvania. It was formed by the Lehigh River, where it cuts through the Blue Mountain in Pennsylvania.

The gap allows easy travel between Carbon County to the north and Lehigh and Northampton counties to the south of the mountain. One of the gap's more distinctive features is Devil's Pulpit, a rock formation that reminds hikers of a church pulpit.

Lehigh Gap is also the name of a village once known as Weider's Crossing at the south end of the gap in Lehigh and Northampton Counties.

== Travel ==
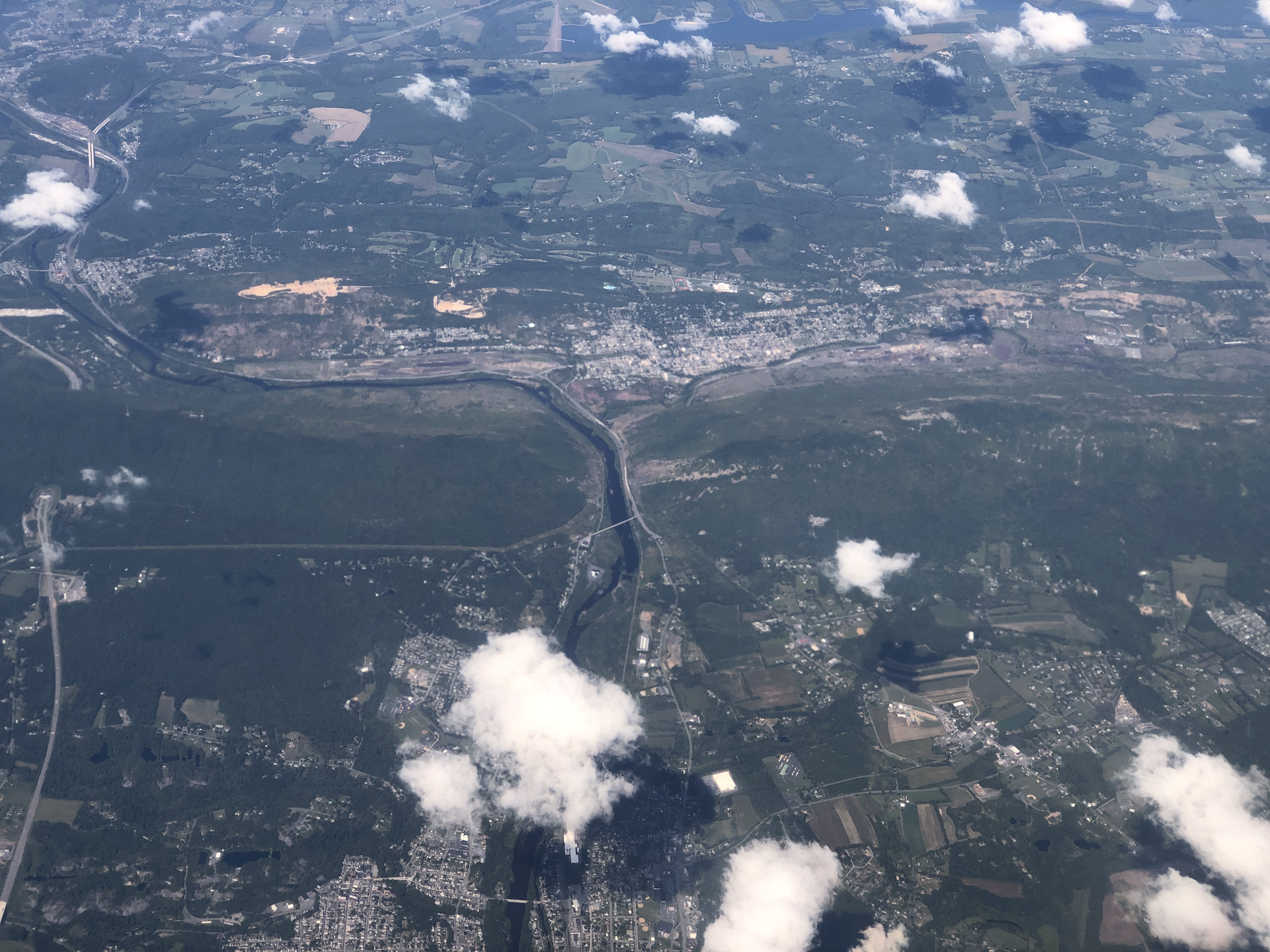
Aerial view of Lehigh Gap in Pennsylvania, including Lower Towamensing and East Penn Township in Carbon County, Washington Township in Lehigh County, and Lehigh Township in Northampton County

PA Route 248 runs directly through the gap, connecting the two Lehigh Valley cities Allentown and Bethlehem to the smaller Carbon County boroughs of Palmerton, Bowmanstown and Lehighton. PA Routes 873 and 145 connect to PA Route 248 just south of the gap.

Besides vehicular travel, the gap also provides a crossing through the mountain for hikers on the Appalachian Trail. Appalachian Thru-hikers call this Dante's inferno because it is a very exposed rock scramble. The Delaware and Lehigh Heritage Corridor Trail also intersects Lehigh Gap.

== Rail transport ==
=== Railroads ===
Four railroad companies once had trackage (owned or leased) through the Lehigh Gap. The Lehigh and New England Railroad used to have a bridge crossing the Lehigh River within the gap. The bridge was abandoned in 1961 and torn down in 1967, but its foundations on each side of the river are still visible as are telegraph poles.

The Lehigh Valley Railroad had its mainline, the Lehigh Line, on the south side of the Lehigh River. The Lehigh and Susquehanna Railroad's mainline was on the north side of the Lehigh River; the Lehigh and Susquehanna was leased to the Central Railroad of New Jersey and labeled the operations of the lease as the "Lehigh and Susquehanna Division".

=== Lehigh Line ===
Today the Lehigh Valley Railroad's mainline, the Lehigh Line, runs on the north side of the Lehigh River rather than on the south side, as the majority of the Lehigh and Susquehanna Railroad's mainline became part of the Lehigh Line. The Lehigh Line's absorption of the majority of the Lehigh and Susquhanna mainline caused some original trackage to break away from the Lehigh Line and became separate rail lines now operating as branch lines, including the Lehigh Line's former trackage on the south side of the Lehigh River. The Lehigh Line's original Lehigh Gap trackage which was on the south side and now operating as a separate rail line on its own was later abandoned and was removed by Conrail in 1984.

With the Lehigh Line being the surviving rail line even though it now runs on the north side via the former Lehigh and Susquehanna Railroad mainline trackage it got, the Lehigh Line is now owned by Norfolk Southern Railway (chartered in 1894 as the Southern Railway and is owned by the Norfolk Southern Corporation) and Canadian Pacific Railway (owned by Canadian Pacific Railway Limited) has trackage rights on the Lehigh Line so that it can reach the major cities Philadelphia and New York City.

== Lehigh Gap Nature Center ==
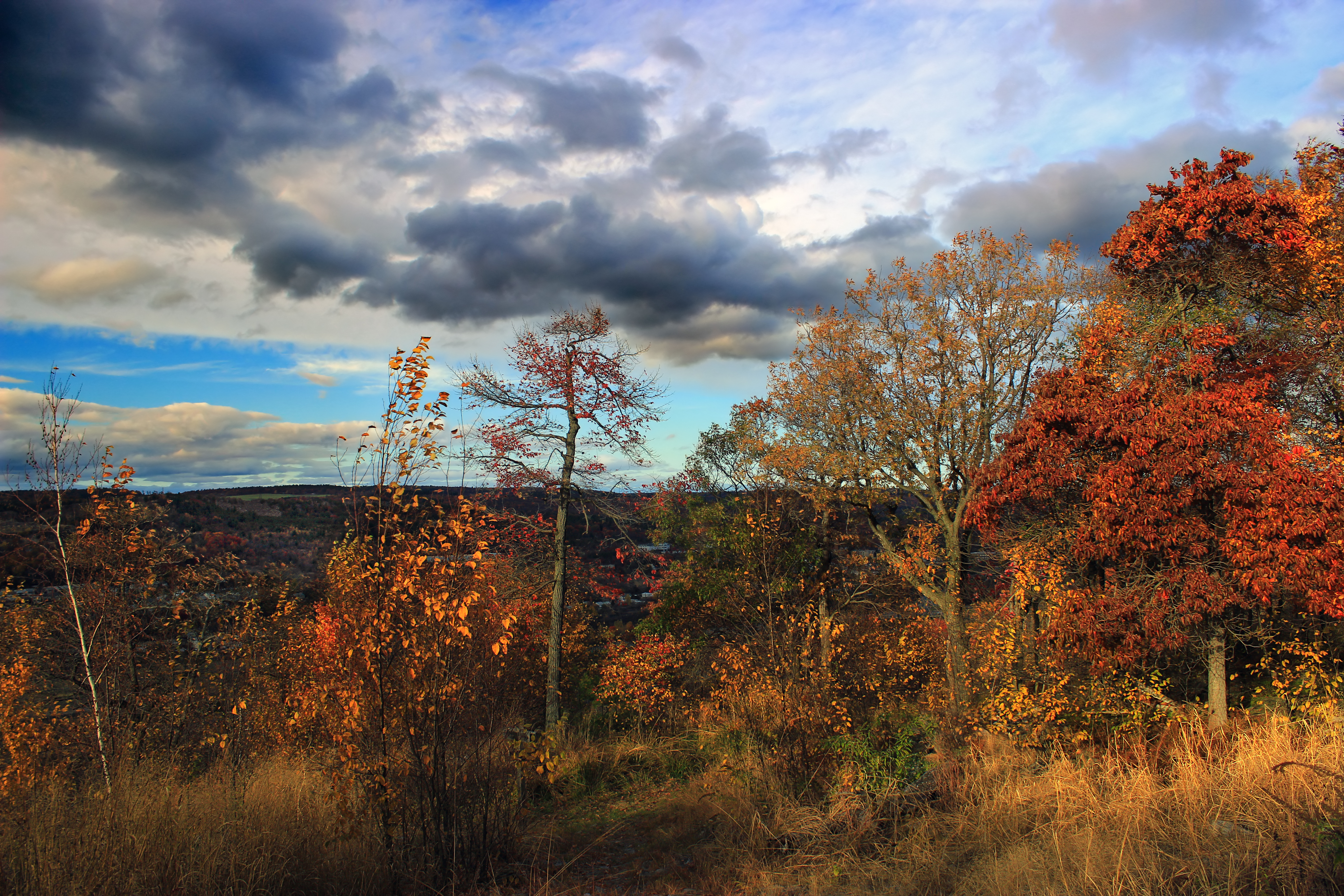
Lehigh Gap Nature Center in Slatington, Pennsylvania in October 2015

In 2002, the Wildlife Information Center, since renamed Lehigh Gap Nature Center, purchased more than 750 acres (3.0 km^{2}) near Lehigh Gap. Their goal is to restore the wildlife along the Kittatinny Ridge. From 1898 to 1980, the New Jersey Zinc Company emitted sulfur dioxide at rates of up to 3,600 pounds per hour, killing plant life and animal habitats. Twenty years later, a noticeable lack of tree density remains on the Palmerton side of the gap.

The Lehigh Gap Nature Center currently includes The Osprey House on the Slatington side of the river. The nature center works closely with colleges and universities on various wildlife-oriented research projects. The center also offers several clubs for young naturalists. The nature center is home to approximately 15 miles of hiking trails, open to the public from dawn to dusk.
