= Hanoverville, Pennsylvania =

Unincorporated community in Pennsylvania, US

- Unincorporated community
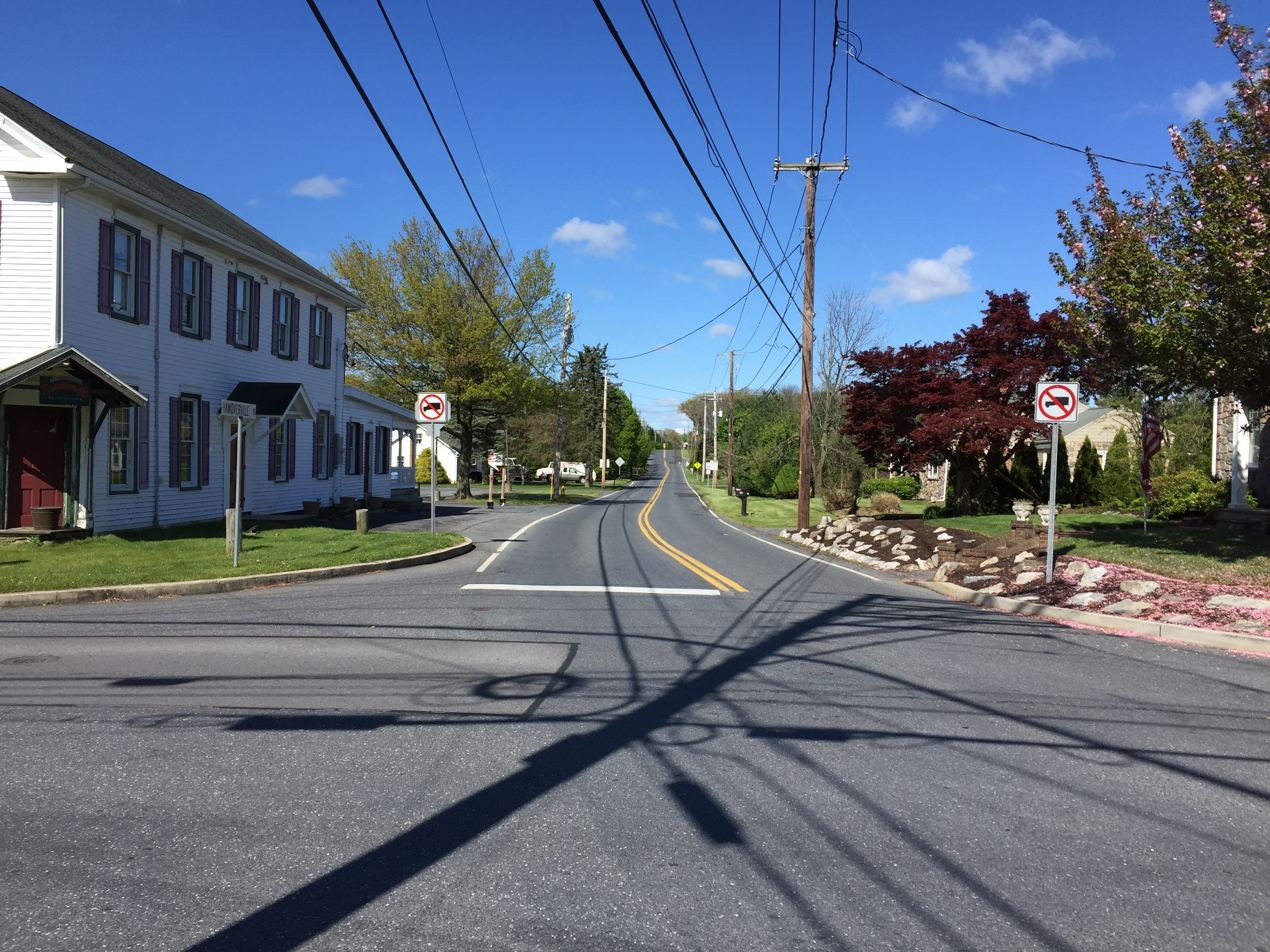
- Hanoverville Road in Hanoverville in May 2020

- Location within Pennsylvania
- Coordinates: 40°40′58″N 75°22′30″W
- Country: United States
- State: Pennsylvania
- County: Northampton
- Township: Bethlehem, Hanover, and Lower Nazareth Township
- Elevation: 377 ft (115 m)

Population
  - Metro: 865,310 (US: 68th)
- Time zone: UTC-5 (Eastern (EST))
  - Summer (DST): UTC-4 (EDT)
- Area codes: 610 and 484
- GNIS feature ID: 1176484

Hanoverville is an unincorporated community in Northampton County, Pennsylvania. It is part of the Lehigh Valley metropolitan area, which had a population of 861,899 and was the 68th-most populous metropolitan area in the U.S. as of the 2020 census.

Hanoverville is located on Township Line Road, south of Hanoverville Road, at the tripoint of Bethlehem, Hanover, and Lower Nazareth townships.
