= Lehigh Street =

- Location: Allentown, Pennsylvania, U.S.
- South end: State Avenue in Emmaus
- Major junctions: I-78 / PA 309 in Allentown
- East end: PA 145 in Allentown

Lehigh Street is a major road that connects Emmaus, Pennsylvania in the west to Allentown, Pennsylvania in the east in the Lehigh Valley region of eastern Pennsylvania. The road is one of six roads that enter and depart Allentown, the third-largest city in Pennsylvania.

Lehigh Street is one of several major Allentown-area exits off Interstate 78, which runs from Interstate 81 in Lebanon County in the west to the Holland Tunnel and Lower Manhattan in the east.

Lehigh Street also serves as a major commercial center for the Lehigh Valley. The Auto Mile, which includes approximately a dozen new and used automobile dealerships, is located on Lehigh Street's western border with Emmaus. As the road enters Allentown from the west, it passes Queen City Airport, an Allentown airport used primarily by small, privately owned aircraft. South Mall, an enclosed shopping mall in Salisbury Township, is located on Lehigh Street.

The Emmaus side of Lehigh Street is the location of Shangy's, a beer distributor with the largest selection of domestic and global beers in the nation, including over 3,000 selections overall.

== History ==
=== Revolutionary War ===
Over the evening of December 25 and 26, 1776, George Washington secretly led his troops across the Delaware River. On the New Jersey side of the Delaware on December 26, Washington and his Continental Army troops then launched a successful surprise attack on Hessian troops at the Battle of Trenton.

Following the victory at Trenton, Washington and his Continental Army staff proceeded to Allentown, where they passed up Lehigh Street, then called Water Street, where they stopped at the foot of the street at a large spring on the property that is the present-day Wire Mill. There, Washington and staff rested and watered their horses, and then went their way to their post of duty.

=== 20th century ===
In 1941, from Cedar Crest Boulevard in Emmaus to S. 6th Street and Auburn Street at present-day PA Route 145 in Allentown, Lehigh Street was designated as Pennsylvania Route 29. In 1960, the designation was removed and it was called Lehigh Street.

== Route description ==
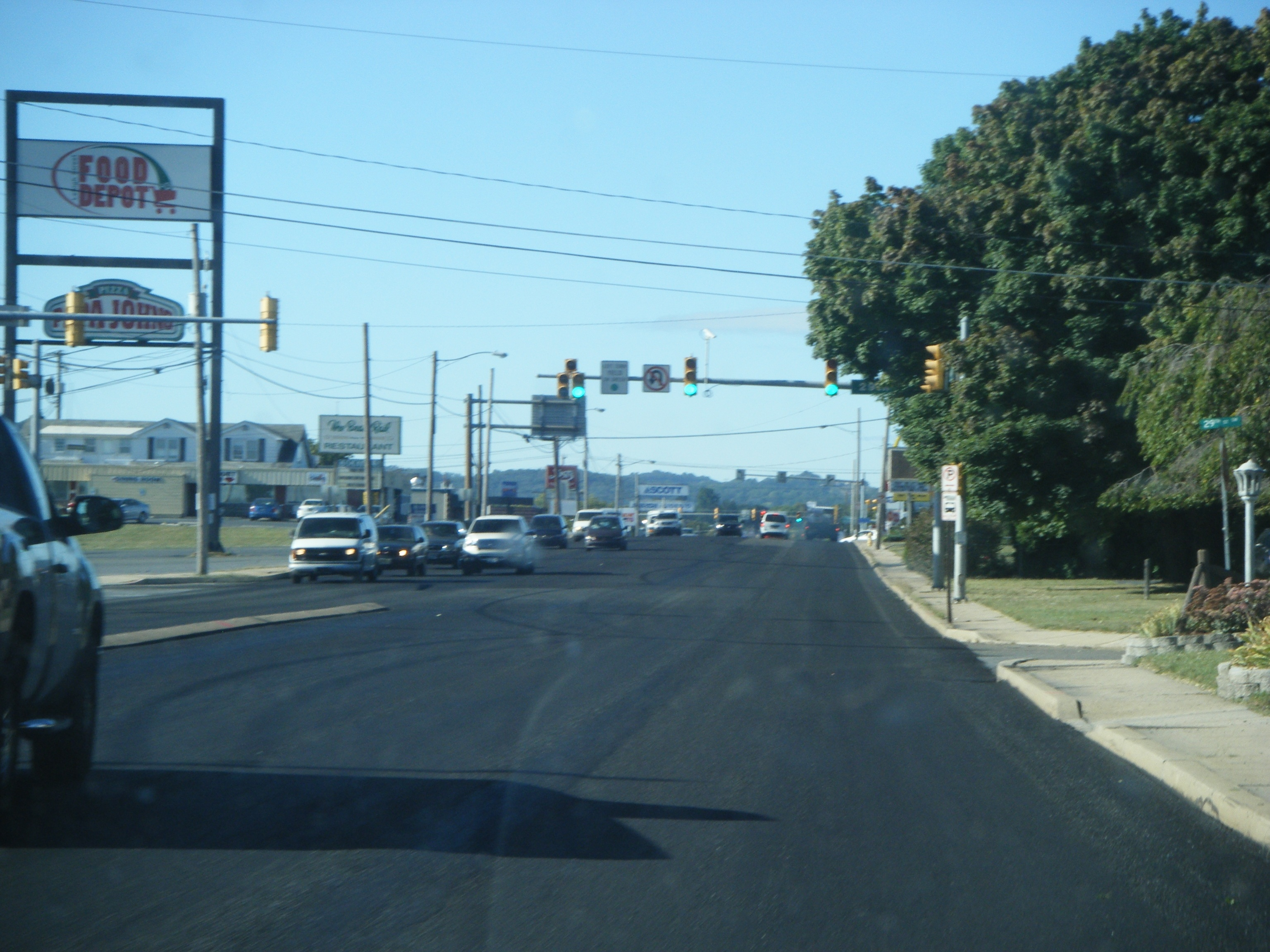
Lehigh Street southbound at 29th Street in Allentown

Lehigh Street is a continuation of State Avenue near South Mall in the northern sections of Emmaus. After crossing the Allentown border with Emmaus, it widens to a four-lane road with a center left-turn lane. From there, Lehigh Street runs northward traversing one of the busiest commercial districts in the city.

North of 29th Street SW, Lehigh Street interchanges the overlap of Interstate 78 and Pennsylvania Route 309, continuing through an underpass east of Allentown Queen City Municipal Airport. The street runs away of the airport in its northward progression. At Lehigh Street's intersection with Jefferson Street, Lehigh Street narrows to two-lanes and turns slightly in a northeast course. North of 12th Street in Allentown, the street does not have the center left-turn lane.

A few blocks from South 12th Street, Lehigh Street intersects several Allentown-area roads and passes south of Bicentennial Park, an outdoor athletic stadium At Wyoming Street, Lehigh turns east and widens to three-lanes with two southbound lanes and one northbound lane and continues west past South 8th Street and Allentown's Albertus L. Meyers Bridge. It then heads eastbound as Saint John Street up to South 6th Street, also known as PA Route 145.

Lehigh Street westbound splits at the intersection with PA Route 145 at South 6th and Auburn Streets four blocks from Center City Allentown. The one-way roadway merges with Saint John Street, which then becomes Lehigh Street eastbound. North of this, PA 145 follows two-way Lehigh Street north, intersecting with Martin Luther King Jr. Drive. Lehigh Street ends at the intersection with Union Street in Center City Allentown, where PA 145 splits into a one-way pair along that street.

== Major intersections ==
The entire route is in Lehigh County.

Location	mi	km	Destinations	Notes
Emmaus			State Avenue	Southern terminus
Allentown			I-78 / PA 309 – Harrisburg, Tamaqua, Bethlehem, Quakertown	Exit 57 (I-78/PA 309).
Allentown			PA 145 (South 6th Street/Auburn Street)	South end of PA 145 overlap
Allentown			PA 145 (Union Street)	Northern terminus
1.000 mi = 1.609 km; 1.000 km = 0.621 mi
