= List of Allentown neighborhoods =

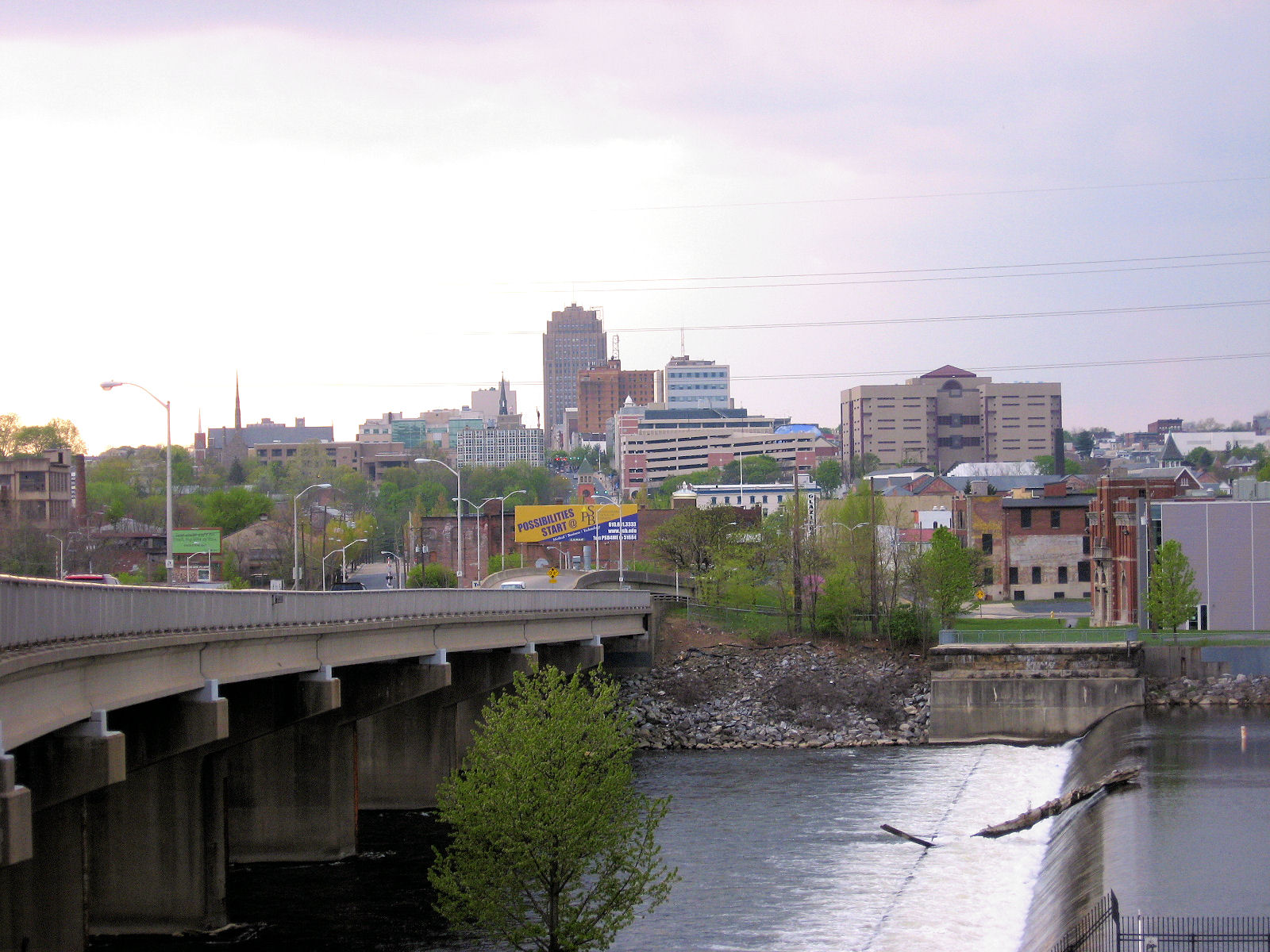
Allentown, the largest city in the Lehigh Valley, the third-largest city in Pennsylvania, and county seat of Lehigh County in May 2010

Allentown, Pennsylvania is the largest city in the Lehigh Valley, the third-largest city in Pennsylvania, and the county seat of Lehigh County. The city includes several neighborhoods, districts, and other places, though these neighborhoods and districts are only informally defined.

== Center City ==
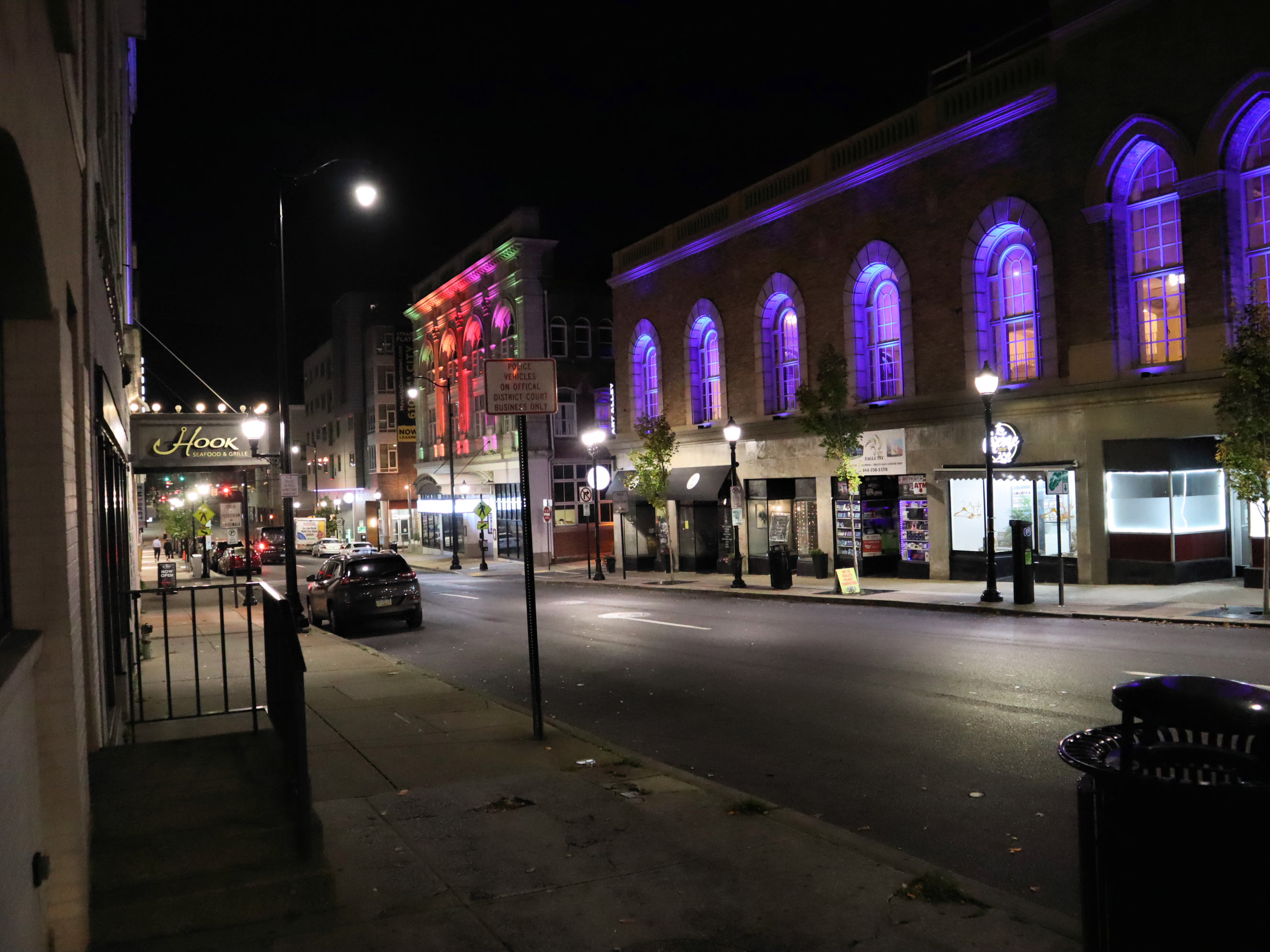
Center City Allentown in October 2020

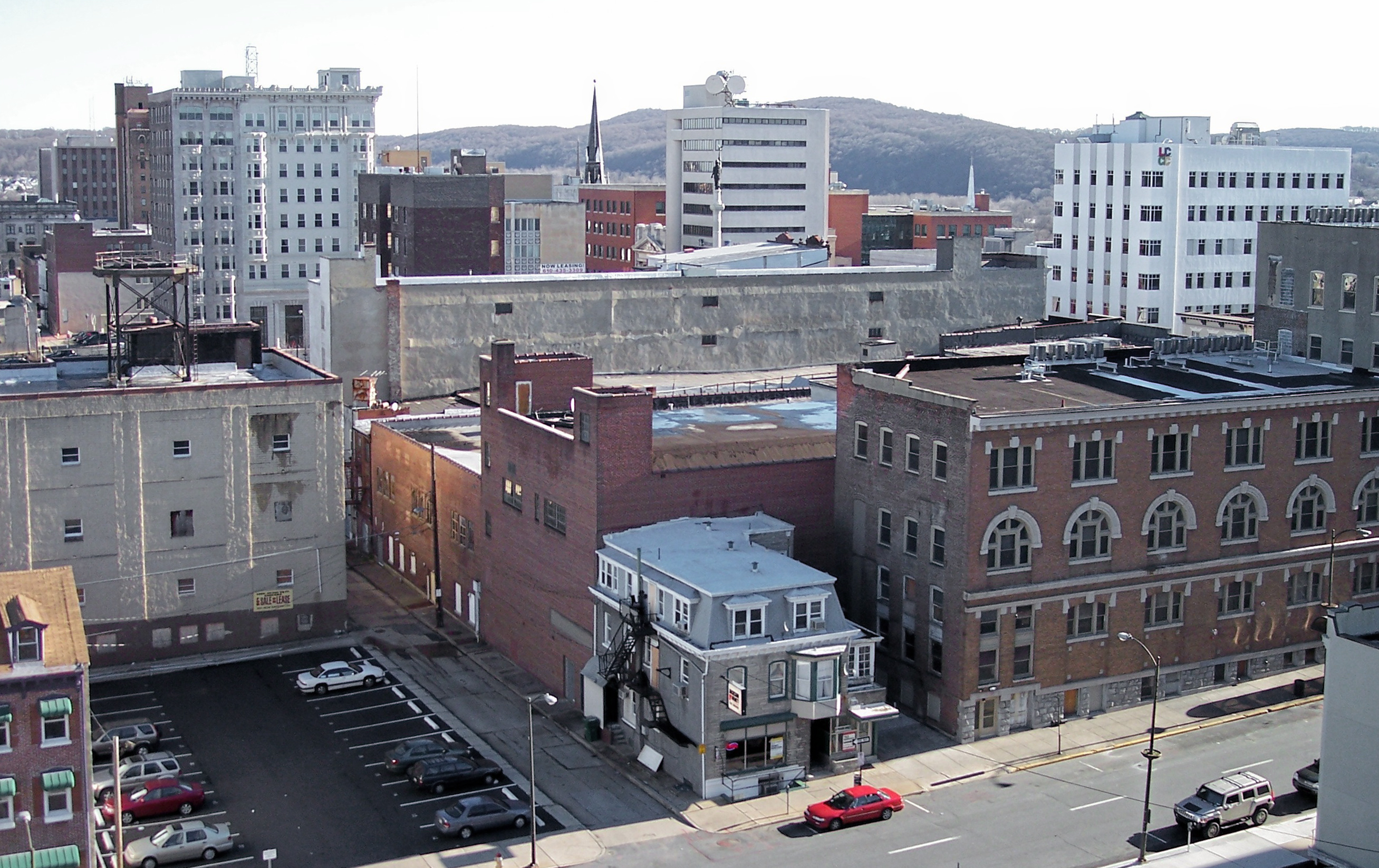
The 700 Block of Hamilton Street in Center City Allentown in January 2007

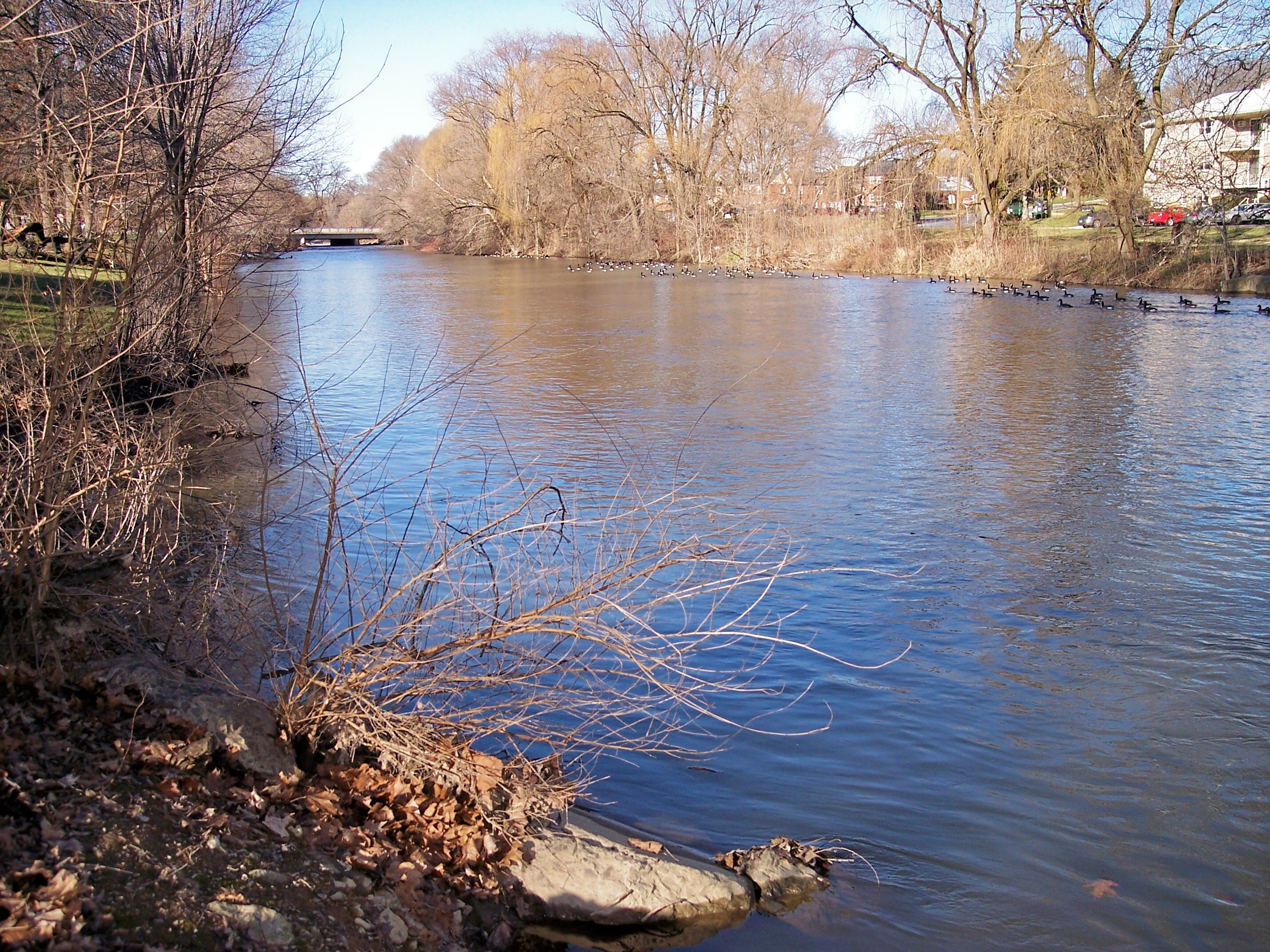
Jordan Creek in Allentown in January 2007

- 7th Street (North 7th Street from the city line to the north through Linden Street to the south)

7th Street is a retail and residential corridor just north of Center City Allentown. It is Allentown's fastest growing commercial corridor and serves as the primary gateway to Allentown with new streetlights, planters, and waste receptacles. Neighborhood service establishments and family-owned ethnic restaurants dominate business on 7th Street.

- Downtown (4th through 12th Streets to the east and west and Walnut through Linden Streets to the south and north)

Downtown Allentown is the city’s central business district. It is home to PPL Corporation and various city, county, and federal government centers. While downtown is no longer considered the premier regional shopping destination of the Lehigh Valley, dozens of small businesses and several prominent restaurants and nightclubs.

Downtown Allentown has been a beneficiary of the Neighborhood Improvement Zone (NIZ), a tax increment financing district that financed the construction of PPL Center at 7th and Hamilton streets and other Center City buildings.

- Arts District (North 5th and North 6th Streets)

One of the anchors of downtown Allentown is its arts district between North 5th and North 6th Streets. The district is home to cultural arts and entertainment venues, including Allentown Art Museum, Allentown Symphony Hall, Baum School of Art, and others.

- Jordan Creek (North of Tilghman from Jordan Creek through 7th Street east to west-north of Tilghman Street to the city line)

This area, including Jordan Creek, is predominantly residential. It has historically had higher poverty rates than surrounding neighborhoods. Prices of properties here are especially affordable, and in recent years it has been a magnet for working artists.

- Old Allentown Historic District (8th through 12th Streets east to west and Linden through Liberty Streets south to north)

The Old Allentown Historic District was established on September 6, 1978, by City Ordinance #12314 and was certified by the Pennsylvania State Historical and Museum Commission on September 26, 1978. The neighborhood was laid out in the original plan for Allentown by order of William Allen in 1762, and developed as Allentown grew northward and westward. It includes a mix of Federal, Italianate, Eastlake, and Victorian housing styles.

Old Allentown now is also the home of the United Way's Allentown Promise Neighborhood initiative, modeled on the work of Geoffrey Canada and the Harlem Children's Zone. The Allentown Promise Neighborhood takes a systems approach to improving the academic performance and the college and career readiness of the children in its nine block area.

- Jordan Heights and Old Fairgrounds (N. 5th and 6th Streets from Gordon to Tilghman Streets south to north)

The Old Fairgrounds Historic District was established on July 8, 1981, by City Ordinance #12314 and was certified by the Pennsylvania State Historical and Museum Commission on September 9, 1981. The district takes its name from the use of the area as the Lehigh County Agricultural Society's fairgrounds from 1852-1888. After the society moved the Allentown Fairgrounds to its current location at 17th and Chew Streets, the land was auctioned off to developers. The area was developed with a mixture of architectural styles, but Victorian architecture is most common.

== East-side ==
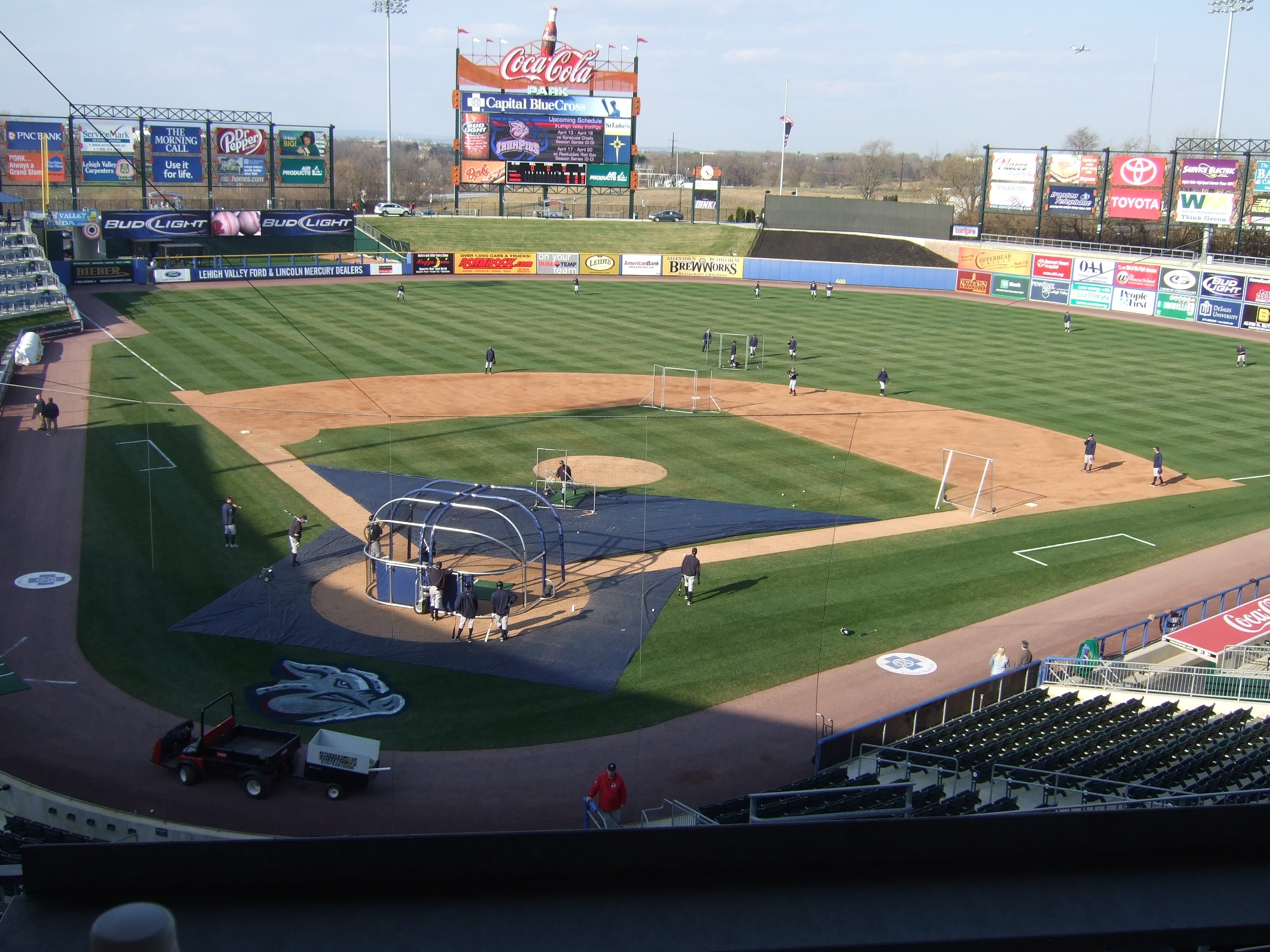
Coca-Cola Park in East Allentown, home of the Lehigh Valley IronPigs, the Triple A affiliate of the Philadelphia Phillies of Major League Baseball

- Dutch Hill (Residential areas of higher elevation on the southern portion of the east-side)

Mainly residential area located between East Hamilton Street and the Lehigh River.

- East Allentown (Dauphin Street through the Lehigh River east to west, and the Lehigh River through Hamilton Boulevard/Hanover Avenue south to north)

A mix of both residential and industrial across the lower east-side of Allentown.

- Midway Manor (the Bethlehem city line through N. Sherman Street east to west, and Union Boulevard through E. Columbia Street south to north)

Residential area with mostly detached and relatively larger houses than those in Center City or surrounding areas.

- Overlook Park (Hanover Avenue/New England Avenue through the Lehigh River east to west, and E. Hamilton Boulevard through E. Allen Street south to north)

A HOPE VI mixed income residential area containing privately managed low-income based rental housing and owner-occupied single and multi-family dwellings.

- Rittersville (the Bethlehem city line through N. Irving Street east to west, including neighborhoods along and adjacent to Hanover Avenue)

Not originally incorporated with the city, Rittersville is mainly residential, but has a small and recently remodelled shopping center. The neighborhood is the former home to the Allentown State Hospital, a recently demolished psychiatric hospital.

== South-side ==
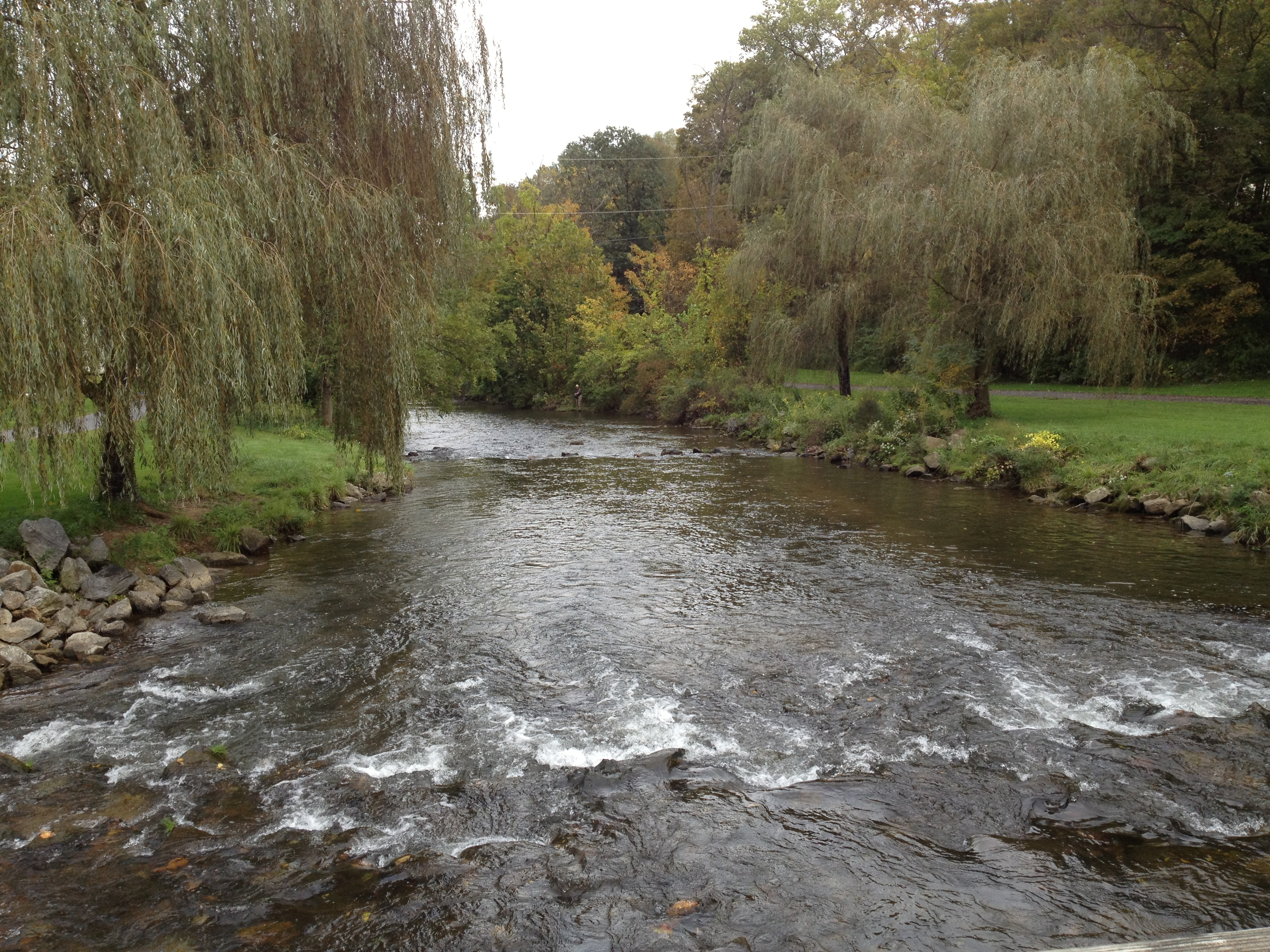
Little Lehigh Creek in Lehigh Parkway in Allentown in September 2012

- Alton Park (Southwest of Interstate 78 and north of Lehigh Street to the city line with Salisbury Township and Emmaus)

Alton Park is a largely residential areas with some forest and park land.

- Cumberland Gardens (E. Cumberland Street from S. Carlisle Street to S. Filbert Street)

Public housing area in the southeast area of Allentown, off of East Susquehanna Street.

- Lehigh Parkway (residential areas to the south and east of the Lehigh Parkway)
- Mountainville (southern tip of the city centered around South 4th Street and Emaus Avenue)

Named for the mountain that PA Route 145 travels over, this neighborhood is at the foot of the South Mountain. It contains a mix of businesses, industry, and residential areas. Mack Trucks' former global headquarters is located nearby.

== The Wards ==
- 1st Ward (Lehigh River to Jordan Creek east to west, and the Little Lehigh Creek through Gordon Street south to north)

The 1st Ward was created under the name "Lehigh Ward" on August 30, 1852. It was the first section annexed to Allentown beyond the original boundaries of the city as established by city founder William Allen in 1762. The industrial sites near the Lehigh River were mostly abandoned by the turn of the 21st century and are now slowly undergoing redevelopment.

- 6th Ward (Lehigh River to the Jordan Creek east to west, and Gordon Street through the city line south to north)

A residential area with a mix of cultures. Houses are spaced farther apart as one nears Allentown/Whitehall Township border.

- The Waterfront' (along the Lehigh River from Allen Street in the south to American Parkway in the north)

The redevelopment will transform approximately 26 acres of abandoned industrial land along the west side of the Lehigh River into a unique and vibrant waterfront featuring offices, retail, restaurants, residential and other commercial uses. With its half mile of direct river frontage, it will be the only location of its kind in the Lehigh Valley to offer unparalleled views of and direct access to the Lehigh River.

== West-end ==
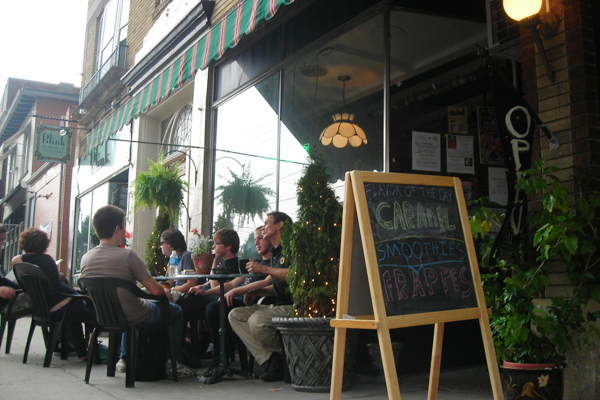
Young people gather on 19th Street in Allentown's West End in July 2007

- Hamilton Park (Union Terrace Park through the city line east to west, and the city line through Hamilton Street south to north)

Residential areas on the West End south of Cedar Creek Park.

- Trexler Park (all areas within the city limits west of Cedar Crest Boulevard)

Trexler Park is the area of Allentown west of Cedar Crest Boulevard, including the park itself.

- West End Theatre District (17th through 22nd Streets to the east and west, and Liberty through Washington Streets to the south and north)

Also known as the 19th Street Theatre District, this area is Allentown’s most promising mixed use neighborhood. Centered on the Civic Theatre of Allentown’s two venues on 19th Street, the West End Theatre District is home to nearly 140 businesses. Within close proximity are Muhlenberg College, Lehigh Valley Health Network’s 17th Street campus, and the Allentown Farmers Market. The opening of several boutique small businesses over the past several years has enhanced the neighborhood’s appeal as a specialty shopping destination.

- West Park Historic District (15th through 17th Streets east to west, and Hamilton through Chew Streets south to north plus the 1400 block of Linden Street)

Attractions such as historic Victorian and American Craftsman-style homes and a public park founded by Harry Clay Trexler in 1908 can be found here. West Park features a newly restored bandshell, where the Allentown Band and others can be heard throughout the summer.

- West Walnut and Union Terrace (15th Street through Union Terrace Park east to west, North to Hamilton Streets and South to South Street)

The West End Pharmacy, Seward's Steak Shop, and the former Hersh's Market are located in this southwest Allentown neighborhood of West Walnut, known to its residents as Union Terrace and often colloquially referred to as UT. It is a small community of row homes, small apartment complexes, bungalow houses, and Victorian-style homes. Two public Allentown School District schools, Union Terrace Elementary School and Francis D. Raub Middle School, are located in the neighborhood.
