= List of city parks and recreation facilities of Allentown, Pennsylvania =

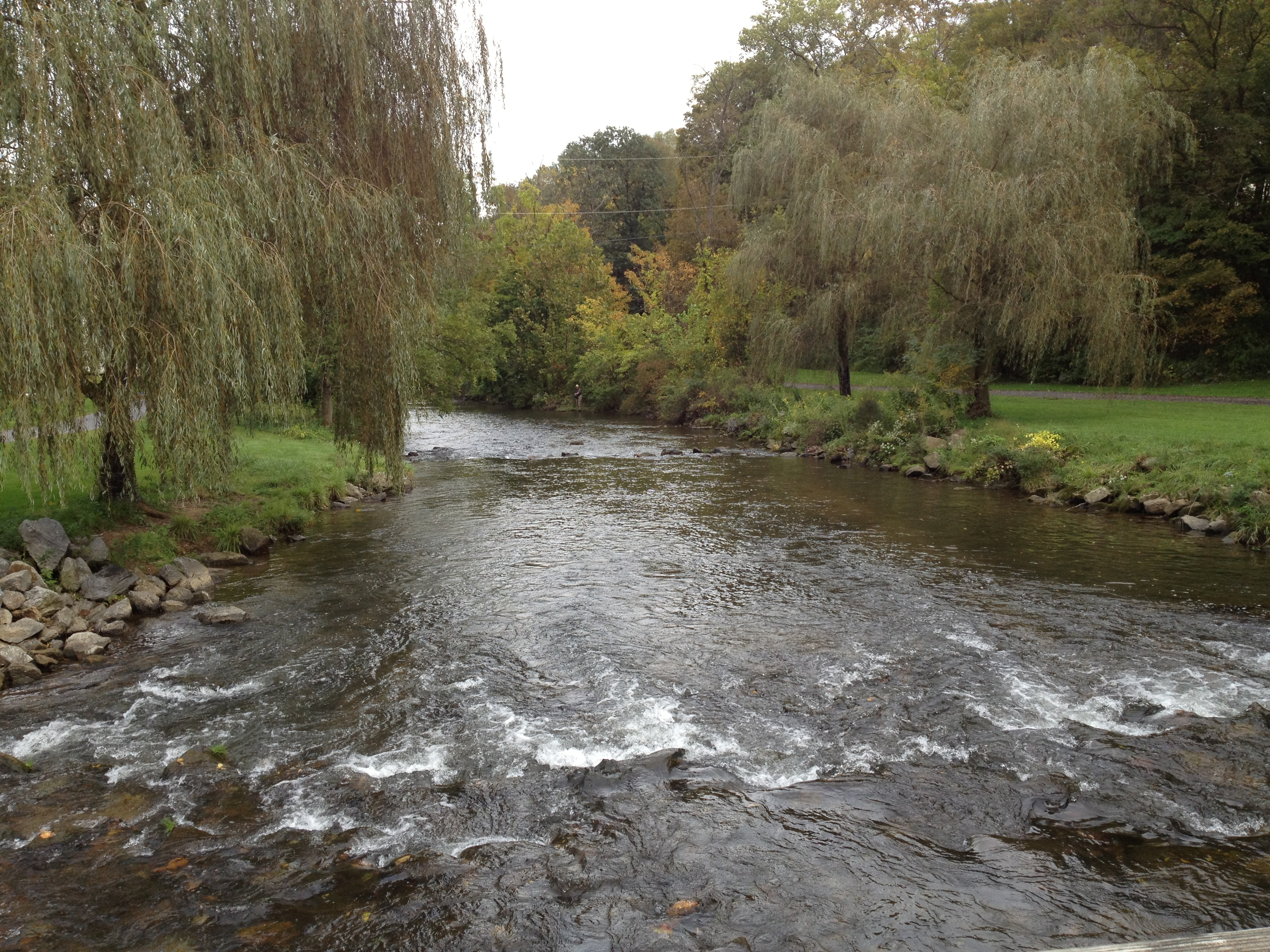
Lehigh Parkway, the largest park in Allentown, built during the 1930s as a Works Progress Administration project, in 2012

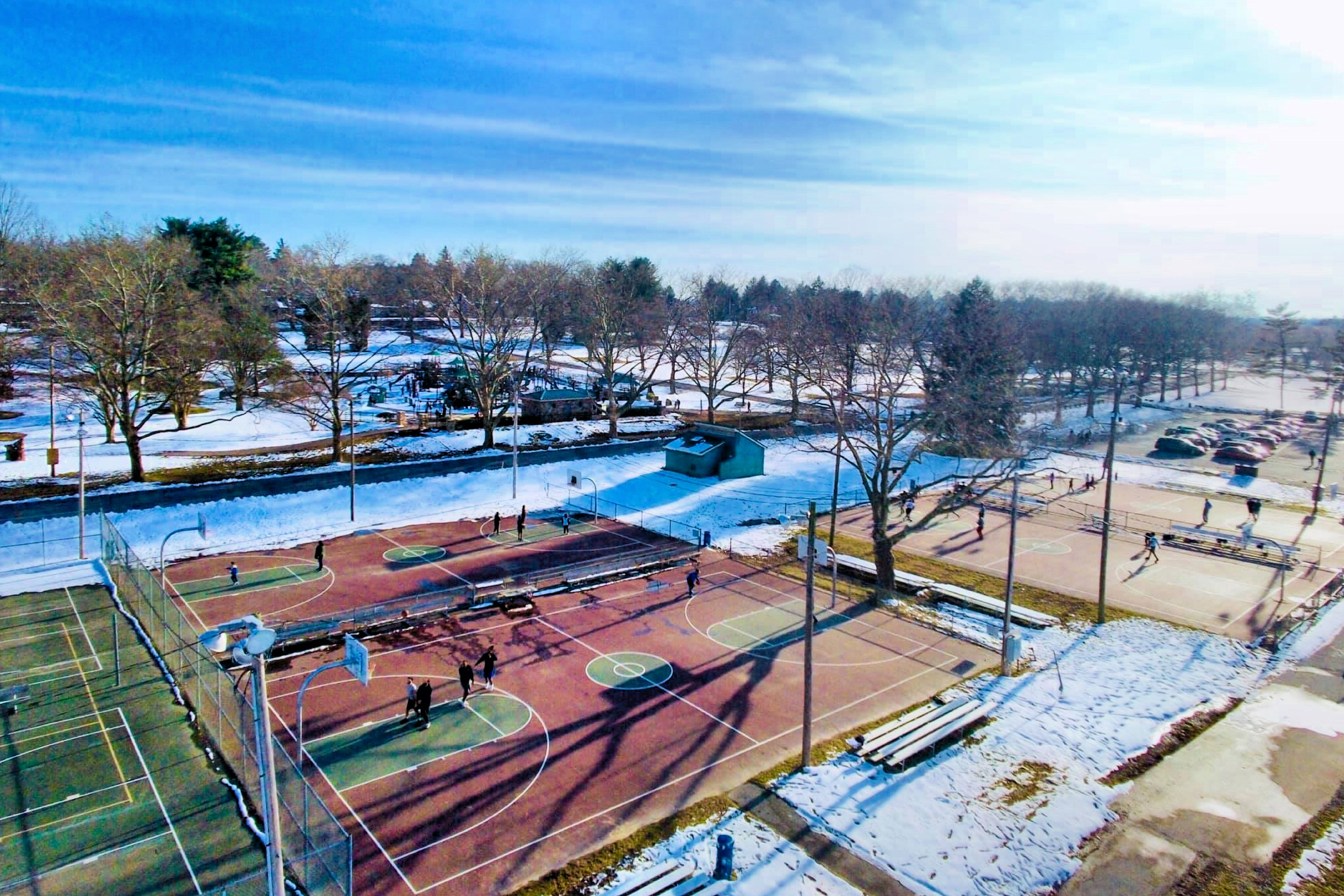
Cedar Creek Park in west-side Allentown in 2019

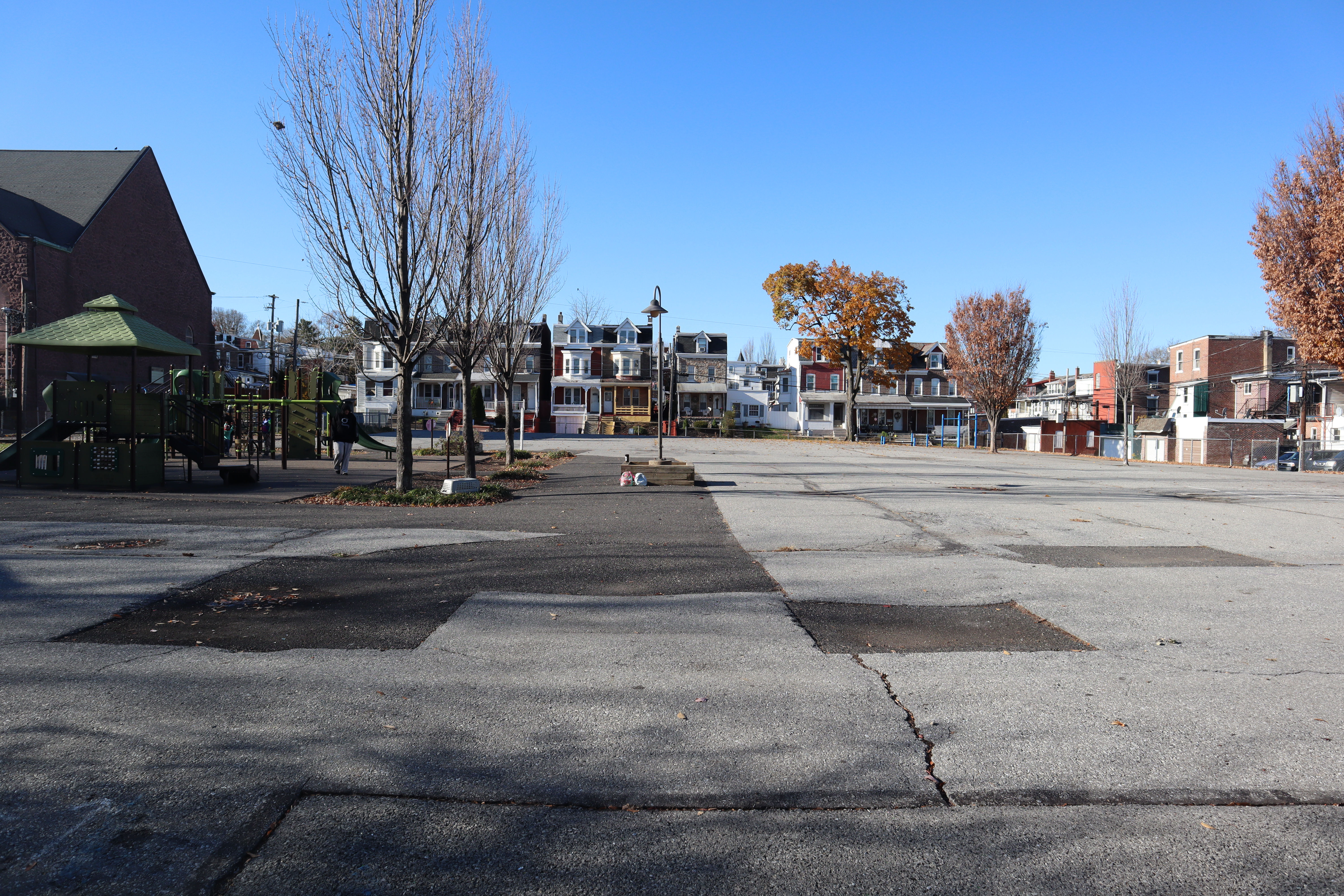
Franklin Park at 218 N. 14th Street in 2021

Allentown, Pennsylvania is nationally-known for its park system.

== History ==
Much of the initial planning and funding of Allentown's park system began in the early 20th century, supported by Harry Clay Trexler, a local industrialist who was inspired by the City Beautiful movement. Trexler brought in B. A. Haldeman, a nationally known city park consultant, to Allentown, and Haldeman provided the plans for the development of the growing city. J. Franklin Meehan of Philadelphia was the landscape architect who laid out many of the city's first public parks.

In 1906, Trexler hired Meehan to lay out a park on the land, which opened in 1909. West Park features a bandshell, designed by Philadelphia architect Horace Trumbauer, which has long been home to the Allentown Band and other community bands. Soon after, it became apparent that a need existed for recreational facilities for children and young people. Meetings of the Allentown City Council were held about this and several proposals were presented and discussed.

Allen Park, located in the vicinity of Trout Hall, was the first city park in Allentown, although it did not become city property until 1908. A 6.59-acre (26,700 m^{2}) park in what was a community trash pit and sandlot baseball field became Allen Park, the city's first public park established in an upscale area of the city.

In 1912, the city's first public playground was established at Fountain Park. During the summer vacation months, all Allentown School District school grounds are open as neighborhood playgrounds.

Trexler also facilitated the development of Cedar Creek Park, the Allentown Municipal Golf Course and the Trout Nursery in Lehigh Parkway.

Following Trexler's death in 1933, Trexler's summer estate, a 142-acre tract was willed to the City of Allentown and was renamed Trexler Memorial Park. The Harry C. Trexler Trust continues to provide private funding for the maintenance and development of Allentown's public park system.

== List of parks and recreation facilities ==
The following is a list of city parks and recreation facilities located in Allentown:

- Allen Park

South 4th and West Union Streets
Map location: 40°36′05″N 075°27′52″W
Part of Trout Hall and Lehigh Country Heritage Museum

- Allentown Municipal Golf Course

3200 block West Tilghman Street
Map location: 40°35′49″N 075°32′05″W
A public 18-hole golf course and clubhouse

- Arts Park

North 4th and West Court Streets
Map location: 40°36′14″N 075°28′07″W
On Allentown Arts Walk across from Allentown Art Museum, now home to a duo of monumental bronze statues by the French painter and sculptor Jean-Léon Gérôme, "Metallurgical Worker" and "Metallurgical Science", painted in 1903, which celebrates steel workers and the steel-era that was an inluential Allentown-area industry for most of the 20th century

- Earl F. Hunsicker Bicentennial Park

510 West Linden Street
Map location: 40°35′15″N 075°28′32″W
A softball park, currently home of the Philadelphia Force

- Bucky Boyle Park

North Front and West Linden streets
Map location: 40°36′38″N 075°27′22″W
Two baseball diamonds, large playarea

- Canal Park

South Albert Street
Map location: 40°35′56″N 075°26′59″W
A large, wooded driving park between Lehigh Canal and Lehigh River with substantial green space

- Cedar Creek Park

Along Parkway Boulevard, West End of Allentown
Map location: 40°35′35″N 075°30′40″W
Large park over 90 Acres, from Lake Muhlenburg west to Cedar Crest Boulevard. Developed in the late 1920s by Mayor Malcom Gross, Sr. Includes tennis courts, children's play area, Cedar Beach public swimming pool, Allentown Rose Garden, and large areas for picnics and recreation activities.

- East Side Memorial Little League

South Bradford and East Maple Streets
Map location: 40°36′23″N 075°27′02″W
Baseball diamond

- East Side Reservoir

South Halstead and East Union Streets
Map location: 40°36′34″N 075°26′27″W
Large area for picnics and recreation activities

- East Side Youth Center

1140 East Clair Street
Map location: 40°37′01″N 075°26′11″W
Youth Center, baseball, soccer recreation fields

- Fellowship East Playlot

North 2nd and West Hamilton streets
Map location: 40°36′20″N 075°27′34″W
Neighborhood playground

- Fountain Park

Lehigh Street and Martin Luther King Drive
Map location: 40°35′52″N 075°27′54″W
Large, drive-thru park with public swimming pool, picnic, and recreation areas

- Franklin Park

218 North 14th Street
Map location: 40°36′05″N 075°29′17″W
Former Franklin Elementary School and now a combination children's playground and asphalt parking lot

- Hamilton Park Playlot

South Ott Street and East Texas Boulevard
Map location: 40°35′03″N 075°30′28″W
Large park with two baseball diamonds, tennis courts, basketball court, a children's play area, and a picnic and recreation area

- Howard Keck Juniata Playlot

Keck and Juniata Streets
Map location: 40°35′07″N 075°28′25″W
Neighborhood playground and a picnic and recreation area

- Irving Park

North Irving and East Tilghman streets
Map location: 40°37′12″N 075°26′25″W
Established in 1940, including a city swimming pool, baseball diamonds, basketball courts, and a picnic and recreation area

- Ithaca Playlot

Ithaca and 31st Street Southwest
Map location: 40°33′18″N 075°28′36″W
Neighborhood playground, picnic and recreation area

- Jordan Meadows

West Gordon Street and American Parkway
Map location: 40°36′43″N 075°27′56″W
Large park including tennis and basketball courts, running track, athletic field, wooded areas and picnic areas along Jordan Creek

- Jordan Park

Michigan Avenue and North Street Extension
Map location: 40°37′11″N 075°28′39″W
City public swimming pool and a large park with numerous baseball diamonds, tennis and basketball courts, and picnic and recreation areas along Jordan Creek

- Joseph S. Daddona Lake and Terrace

South St. Elmo and West Union streets
Map location: 40°35′32″N 075°29′46″W
Formerly Union Terrace Park. Large, 21 Acre park built by WPA over a former mosquito wetland. Park features WPA built grass and stone outdoor amphitheater. Includes Union Terrace Lake, baseball diamonds and recreation fields, also areas for picnicking and recreation.

- Keck Park

South Austin Street
Map location: 40°36′07″N 075°26′42″W
Driving park loop though wooded area. also large grassy area for picnicking and recreation

- Kimmets Landing (Lehigh Canal)

Allentown Drive and North Dauphin Street
Map location: 40°37′32″N 075°27′32″W
Former Lehigh Canal lock. Wooded area, parking and small grassy areas for recreation

- Lehigh Landing

West Hamilton and North Front Streets
Map location: 40°36′24″N 075°27′23″W
Part of America On Wheels Museum

- Lehigh Parkway

Entrance at Park Drive and Ward Street
Map location: 40°34′56″N 075°28′58″W
Largest park in Allentown, 629 acres. Land acquired in 1929, developed by Works Progress Administration (WPA) during the 1930s, providing jobs during the Great Depression years. It is the most prominent park of the city and follows the Little Lehigh Stream for three miles. The park features many scenic exercising trails in addition to bridle paths, a shooting range, and many fishing locations.

- Lumber and Benton Playlot

South Lunber and Benton Streets
Map location: 40°34′32″N 075°27′54″W
Neighborhood Playground

- Mack Pool

2100 Mack Boulevard
Map location: 40°34′27″N 075°28′12″W
City public swimming pool and recreation area

- Mountainville Memorial Youth Association

West Wabash and South 5th Streets
Map location: 40°34′54″N 075°27′31″W
Three baseball diamonds, large recreation field

- Nice 13 Tot Lot

West Jackson and West Union streets
Map location: 40°35′55″N 075°28′28″W
A children's playground

- Old Fairgrounds Playground

440 North 5th Street
Map location: 40°33′55″N 075°28′16″W
A neighborhood playground

- Patriots Park (1939)

St. John and South Plumb streets
Map location: 40°35′24″N 075°28′31″W
Baseball diamond, home of the Allentown Patriots softball team (1948-1976), including lights, stands, and community building erected in 1957.

- Percy B. Ruhe Park

Oxford Drive and Pearl Avenue
Map location: 40°33′49″N 075°29′38″W
Formerly Alton Park Recreation Area, including a large park, tennis courts, baseball diamonds, picnic and recreation areas

- Roosevelt Park

Camp and South Woodward Streets
Map location: 40°35′34″N 075°27′22″W
Seven acres in size, including a baseball diamond and picnic and recreation area

- Salisbury Dr Playlot

3025 Salisbury Street
Map location: 40°33′51″N 075°29′52″W
Neighborhood children's playground

- South Mountain Reservoir and Park

South 10th Street and Reservoir Road
Map location: 40°33′57″N 075°27′49″W
Reservoir area with long circular driving road and large athletic field with a park area that has a scenic vista point from top of South Mountain

- South Street Playlot

South and West Mosser Streets
Map location: 40°34′58″N 075°30′48″W
Neighborhood children' playground, picnic and recreation areas

- Sterners Island

Island in Lehigh River, only accessible by boat
Map location: 40°36′36″N 075°25′35″W
Long, large wooded island. No amenities

- Stevens Park

North 6th and West Tilghman Streets
Map location: 40°36′43″N 075°28′28″W
Former Stevens Elementary School, including a neighborhood children' playground

- Trexler Memorial Park

Springhouse Road
Map location: 40°35′33″N 075°31′44″W
The former summer home of Harry Clay Trexler that was deeded to City of Allentown after Trexler's death in 1933. Now large park with lake, long biking road, large grassy and wooded areas for picnicking and recreation. Wild game preserve, home of several hundred ducks, geese and swans. Motor vehicles allowed in the parking area by the park entrance but nowhere else.

- Trout Creek Park

South 4th and Harrison streets
Map location: 40°35′33″N 075°31′44″W
A large park along Trout Creek, including a long road though the park, which is primarily wooded and grassy and includes picnic and recreation areas and a baseball field

- Turner and 4th Playlot

West Turner and North 4th streets
Map location: 40°36′23″N 075°27′57″W
Primarily wooded and grassy areas for picnicking and recreation

- Union Terrace

South and Elmo streets
Map location: 40°35′20″N 075°29′53″W
A wooded area

- Valania Park

South Law and Union streets
Map location: 40°36′02″N 075°28′02″W
Also known as John Valeniz Park, includes a children's playground, basketball court, wooded area

- Waldon Terrace Playlot

South Carbon Street
Map location: 40°34′17″N 075°27′46″W
Neighborhood children's playground, basketball court, recreation Field, and picnic area

- West Park

1550 West Turner Street
Map location: 40°35′57″N 075°29′26″W
Elegant park with walking paths, including a community bandshell, now home of the Allentown Band, and ornamental trees, flower gardens, and a large central fountain
