= Climate of Allentown, Pennsylvania =

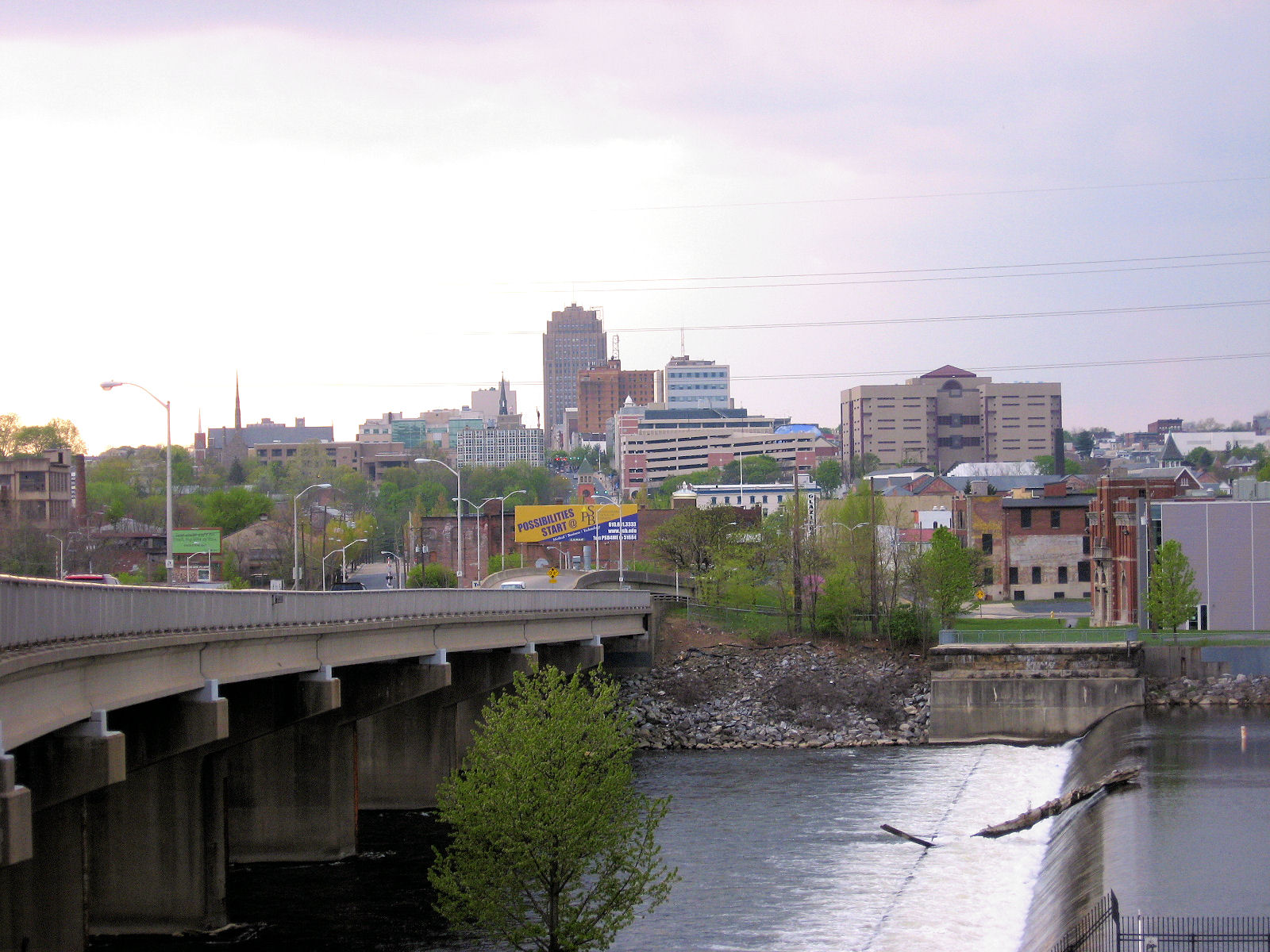
Allentown, Pennsylvania, the largest city in the Lehigh Valley, third-largest city in Pennsylvania, and county seat of Lehigh County, May 2010

The climate of Allentown, Pennsylvania is classified as a humid continental climate (Köppen Dfa). Allentown's warmest month (on average) is July with a daily average temperature of 74.7 °F (23.7 °C) and the coldest month (on average) being January with a daily average of 29.4 °F (−1.4 °C). The average precipitation of Allentown is 45.35 inches (1,152 mm) per year.

Allentown occasionally has some severe weather, mostly thunderstorms and flooding. Winters can bring snow, with some years receiving very little of it while others seeing several major snowstorms, often Nor'easters. Winter also brings the more dangerous ice, sleet, and freezing rain, which has caused several traffic accidents over the years. Tropical storms and hurricanes occasionally survive up the coast of the Atlantic Ocean and cross into Pennsylvania. Storms such as Hurricane Ivan in 2004 and Hurricane Sandy in 2012 caused light to severe damage in Allentown and its surrounding suburbs.

== Average temperatures ==
Climate data for Allentown, Pennsylvania at Lehigh Valley International Airport, 1991–2020 normals, (Note: Mean monthly maxima and minima (i.e. the highest and lowest temperature readings during an entire month or year) calculated based on data at said location from 1981 to 2010.) extremes 1922–present (Note: Official records for Allentown were kept at Allentown Gas Company from March 1922 to December 1943, and at Lehigh Valley Int'l since January 1944. For more information, see ThreadEx.)
Month	Jan	Feb	Mar	Apr	May	Jun	Jul	Aug	Sep	Oct	Nov	Dec	Year
Record high °F (°C)	72 (22)	81 (27)	87 (31)	93 (34)	97 (36)	100 (38)	105 (41)	100 (38)	99 (37)	93 (34)	81 (27)	72 (22)	105 (41)
Mean maximum °F (°C)	60.2 (15.7)	60.6 (15.9)	70.6 (21.4)	83.2 (28.4)	89.3 (31.8)	92.6 (33.7)	94.8 (34.9)	92.8 (33.8)	89.2 (31.8)	80.4 (26.9)	70.9 (21.6)	61.7 (16.5)	95.9 (35.5)
Mean daily maximum °F (°C)	38.4 (3.6)	41.6 (5.3)	50.8 (10.4)	63.4 (17.4)	73.5 (23.1)	81.9 (27.7)	86.4 (30.2)	84.3 (29.1)	77.4 (25.2)	65.5 (18.6)	53.8 (12.1)	43.1 (6.2)	63.3 (17.4)
Daily mean °F (°C)	30.1 (−1.1)	32.4 (0.2)	40.7 (4.8)	51.8 (11.0)	62.0 (16.7)	70.9 (21.6)	75.6 (24.2)	73.6 (23.1)	66.3 (19.1)	54.6 (12.6)	43.9 (6.6)	35.0 (1.7)	53.1 (11.7)
Mean daily minimum °F (°C)	21.8 (−5.7)	23.2 (−4.9)	30.5 (−0.8)	40.3 (4.6)	50.6 (10.3)	59.9 (15.5)	64.7 (18.2)	62.8 (17.1)	55.2 (12.9)	43.8 (6.6)	34.1 (1.2)	26.8 (−2.9)	42.8 (6.0)
Mean minimum °F (°C)	4.2 (−15.4)	5.9 (−14.5)	14.1 (−9.9)	25.9 (−3.4)	35.3 (1.8)	46.5 (8.1)	53.7 (12.1)	51.1 (10.6)	39.9 (4.4)	28.7 (−1.8)	19.1 (−7.2)	11.7 (−11.3)	1.8 (−16.8)
Record low °F (°C)	−15 (−26)	−12 (−24)	−5 (−21)	12 (−11)	28 (−2)	39 (4)	46 (8)	41 (5)	30 (−1)	21 (−6)	3 (−16)	−8 (−22)	−15 (−26)
Average precipitation inches (mm)	3.30 (84)	2.77 (70)	3.63 (92)	3.67 (93)	3.65 (93)	4.40 (112)	5.30 (135)	4.56 (116)	4.84 (123)	4.14 (105)	3.24 (82)	3.86 (98)	47.36 (1,203)
Average snowfall inches (cm)	9.8 (25)	10.8 (27)	6.3 (16)	0.5 (1.3)	0.0 (0.0)	0.0 (0.0)	0.0 (0.0)	0.0 (0.0)	0.0 (0.0)	0.2 (0.51)	0.9 (2.3)	4.6 (12)	33.1 (84)
Average extreme snow depth inches (cm)	6.4 (16)	7.9 (20)	4.9 (12)	0.3 (0.76)	0.0 (0.0)	0.0 (0.0)	0.0 (0.0)	0.0 (0.0)	0.0 (0.0)	0.2 (0.51)	0.6 (1.5)	2.9 (7.4)	12.4 (31)
Average precipitation days (≥ 0.01 in)	11.4	10.1	10.9	11.8	12.4	11.4	11.0	10.2	9.6	9.9	8.9	11.5	129.1
Average snowy days (≥ 0.1 in)	5.1	4.3	2.6	0.3	0.0	0.0	0.0	0.0	0.0	0.0	0.5	2.9	15.7
Average relative humidity (%)	70	66	62	61	66	68	70	72	74	72	70	71	69
Percentage possible sunshine	43	48	53	47	54	63	57	56	54	53	45	42	51
Source: NOAA (relative humidity 1981–2010)

== Extremes ==
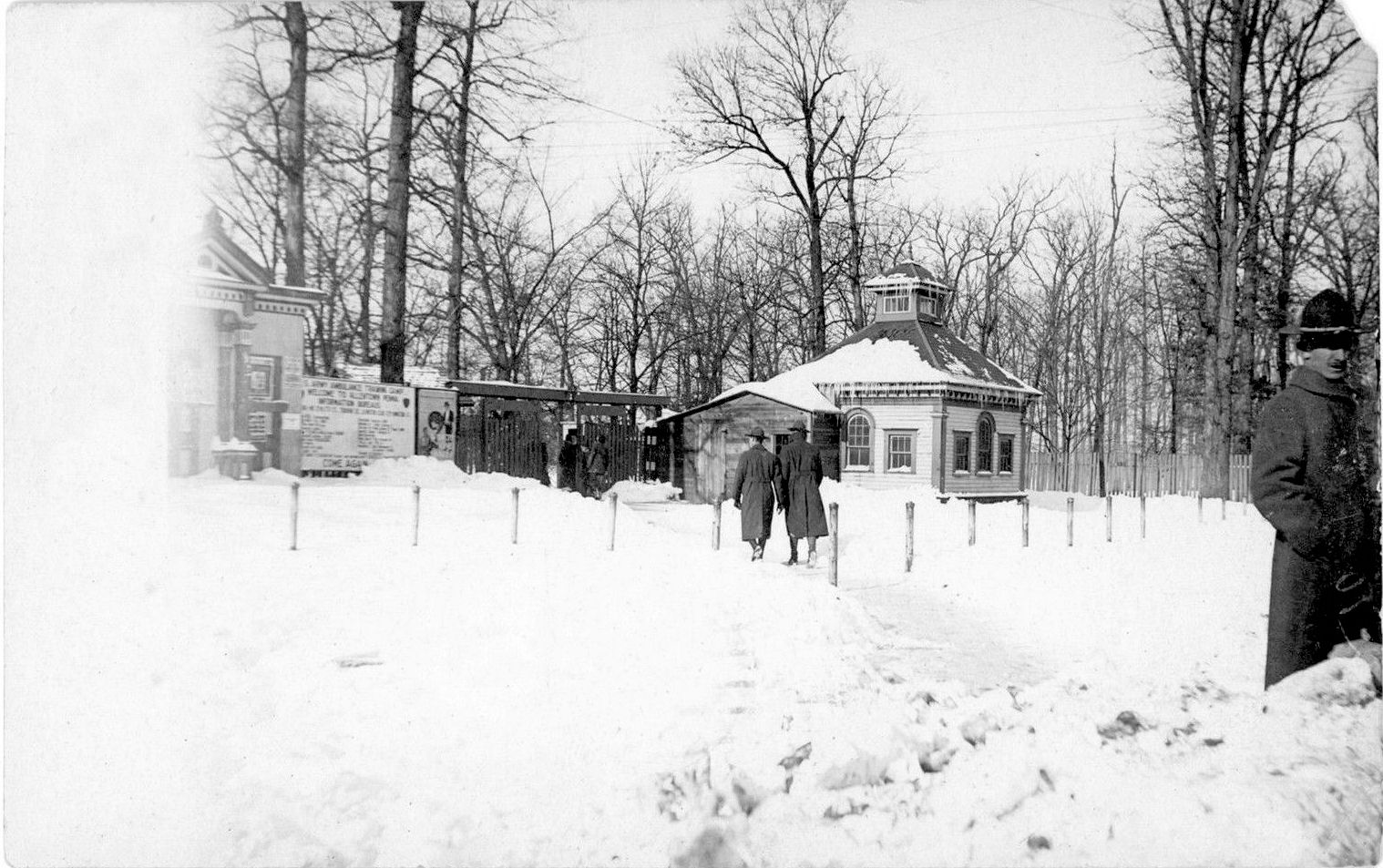
An Allentown snow storm in 1918

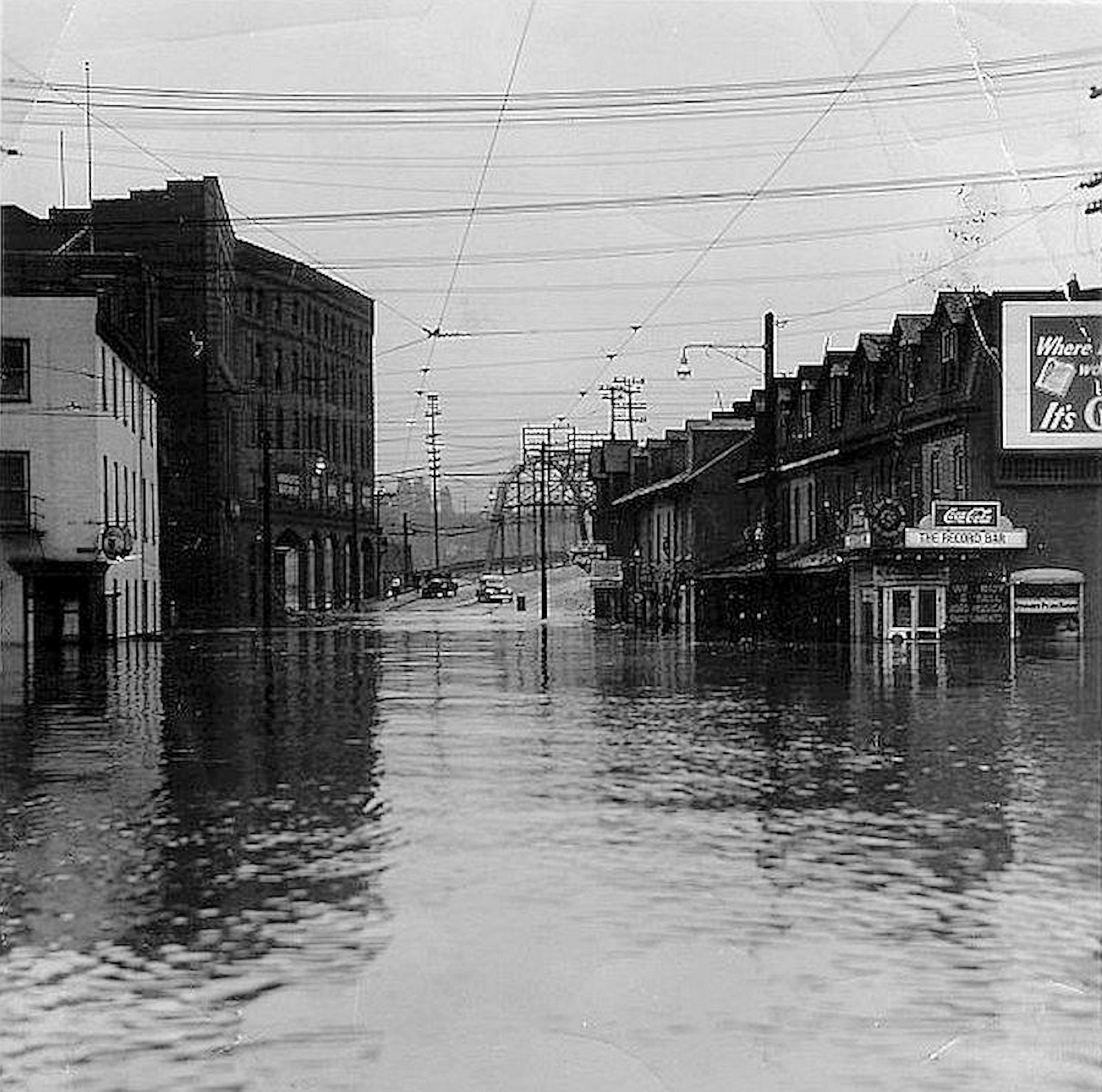
Hamilton and Front Streets in Center City Allentown during the 1942 Allentown flood

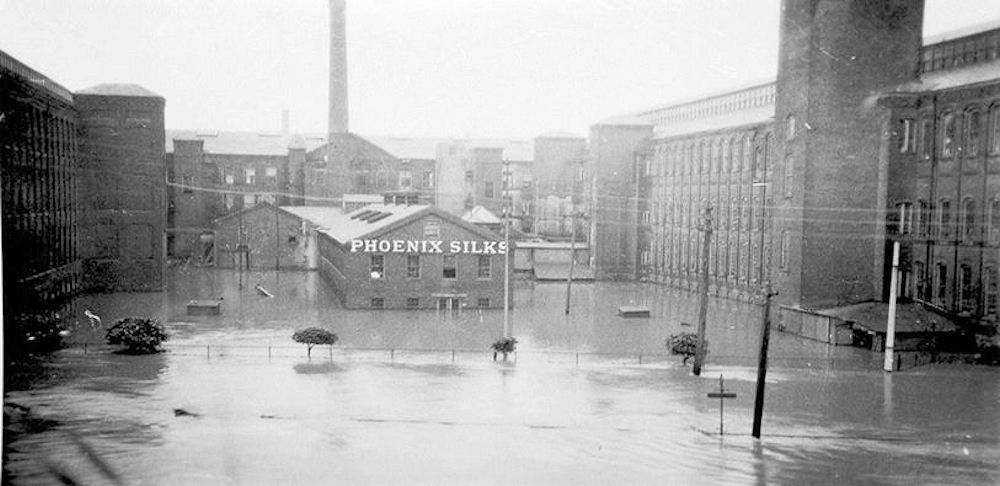
The Great Flood of Allentown in 1933

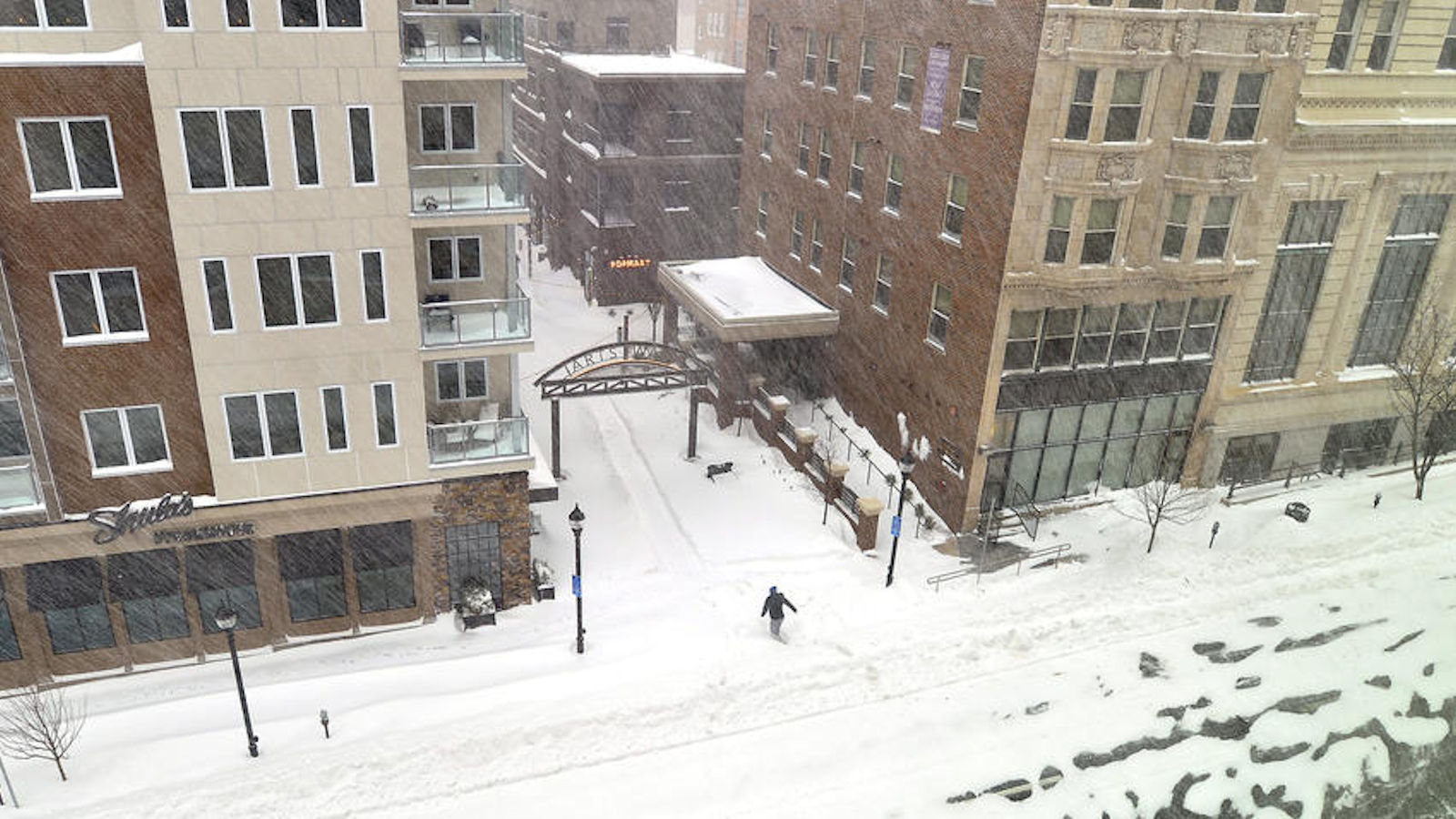
A winter snow storm in Allentown in 2016

Allentown began maintaining weather records in 1922. Records from 1922 to date include:

=== Temperature ===
- Highest recorded temperature: 105 °F (41 °C) on July 3, 1966
- Lowest daily maximum temperature: 2 °F (−17 °C) on January 19, 1994
- Highest daily minimum temperature: 79 °F (26 °C) on July 15, 1995
- Lowest recorded temperature: −15 °F (−26 °C) on January 21, 1994
- Highest daily average temperature: 91.0 °F (32.8 °C) on July 22, 2011
- Lowest daily average temperature: −4.5 °F (−20.3 °C) on January 19, 1994

=== Precipitation and snow ===
- Most precipitation in 24 hours: 8.71 in (221.2 mm) October 8, 2005
- Heaviest 24-hour snowfall: 24.0 in (61.0 cm) on February 11, 1983
- Greatest daily snow depth: 28 in (71 cm) on February 12, 1983

== Summer ==
Summers in Allentown and the surrounding Lehigh Valley region of eastern Pennsylvania are hot and very humid, with temperatures in the mid-80s and low-90s. The average high temperature peaks at 84 °F (29 °C), but highs can often surpass that, with the all-time record high standing at 105 °F (41 °C). Humidity is often around 80 percent, which is a drastic change for someone living in the Southwest United States. Rain is common, and is often accompanied by strong or severe thunderstorms. These will cause quite a large amount of rain, but they do not last long at all. Air conditioning is popular among most households in the summer months, because high temperatures and high humidity can make the air feel much warmer than the actual temperature.

== Autumn ==
Autumn is fairly mild, with daytime temperatures in the 70s and 60s. Autumn brings more wind, and sometimes heavier rainfall. Trees begin to lose their leaves before the cold winter season. Indian summer may occur.

== Winter ==
Winters are cool to cold, with January's high temperature at 35 °F (2 °C). The highest temperature recorded was 76 °F (24 °C) in February, 87 °F (31 °C) in March, and 72 °F (22 °C) in both December and January. Snowfall is common, with amounts varying greatly between seasons. Snow, ice, sleet, and freezing rain can cause road problems and school closures. In February 2007, Interstate Highway 78 was closed just west of the city. Drivers were stranded on the stretch of highway for as much as 24 hours, with overturned tractor trailers blocking the way. Winter sports are popular, such as snowboarding and skiing, and they can be enjoyed in the Pocono Mountains, just north of the Lehigh Valley.

== Spring ==
Spring is a season of growth, with new grass growing and flowers blooming. Animals come out of hibernation, and sun fills the city and its surroundings. Temperatures are on the rise, but March and April bring much rain, with light rain that can last for hours on end. That gives way to warm May and June months, and shore weather is in the forecast for many residents.

== Natural disasters ==
Hurricanes, tropical storms, and tropical depressions are all summer threats. Severe thunderstorms are an even bigger threat, and can cause flash flooding. When flash flooding occurs, mudslides are rare but possible. Tornadoes and earthquakes are also rare but have been reported. Blizzards occur approximately every ten or fifteen years.

== See also ==
- Lehigh Valley
