= Lehigh Parkway =

Park in Allentown, Pennsylvania, United States

Coordinates: 40.5781°N 75.4916°W

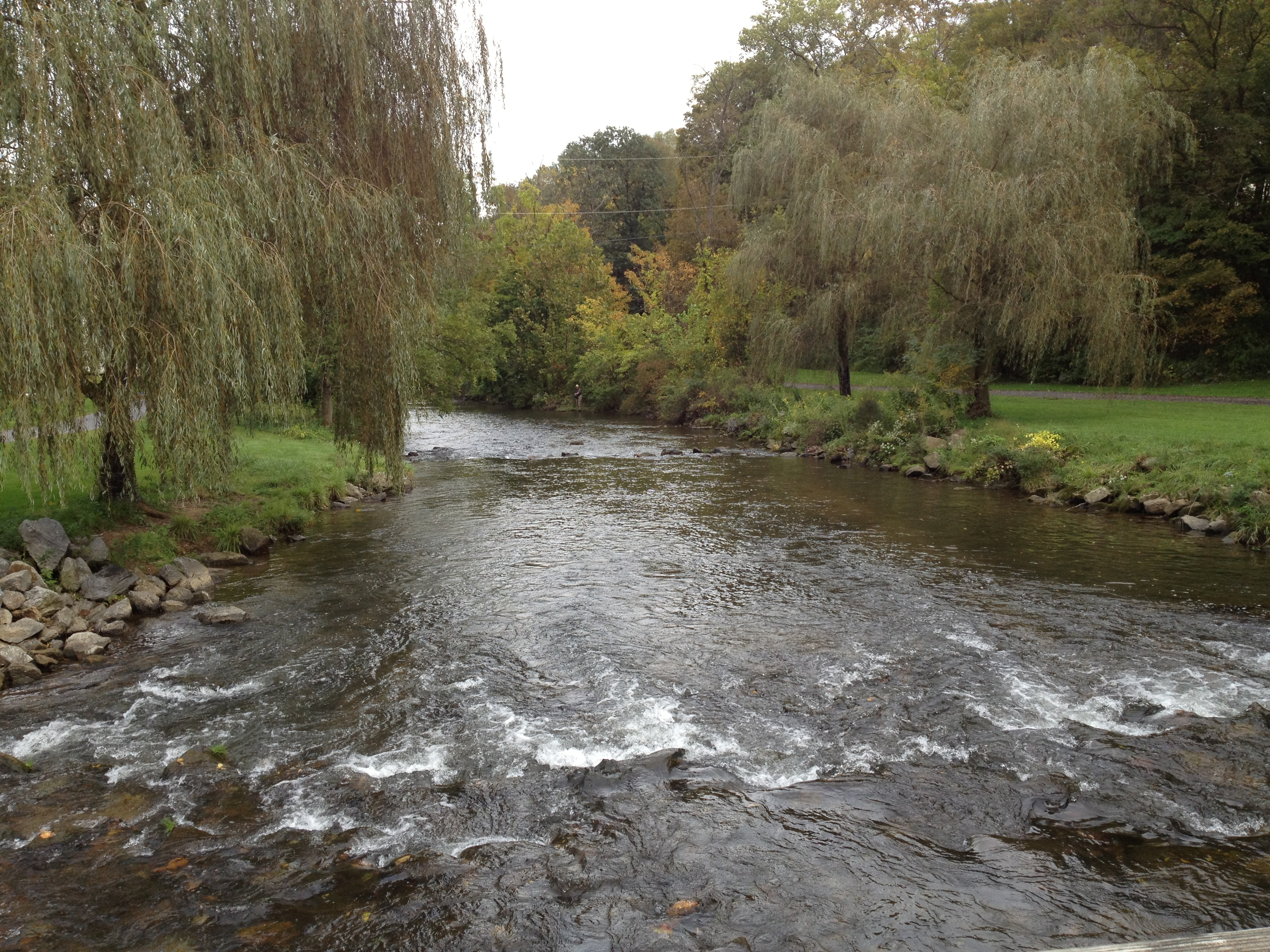
Little Lehigh Creek in Lehigh Parkway in Allentown, Pennsylvania in September 2012

Lehigh Parkway is a large, 629-acre public park along the Little Lehigh Creek in Allentown, Pennsylvania in the Lehigh Valley region of eastern Pennsylvania. It is the most prominent park in the city and follows the Little Lehigh Creek southward for three miles from center city Allentown to Cedar Crest Boulevard in neighboring Emmaus.

== History and park features ==
According to The Morning Call, an Allentown-based newspaper, "The idea for creating Lehigh Parkway first emerged in 1922" during a meeting between the city council, the city's chamber of commerce and the city planning commission. The head of the planning commission at that time, Harry Clay Trexler, had a longstanding interest in expanding the city's parks system, and had overseen the creation of the city's West Park in 1907. Embarking on the development of a comprehensive system of parks for the benefit of Allentown residents, city leaders subsequently hired B. Antrim Haldeman to serve as their planning consultant, which resulted in the planning commission's purchase of land along the banks of the Little Lehigh Creek in 1928. The first Lehigh Parkway contract was awarded to contractor George H. Hardner on September 9, 1930, in the amount of $46,170 to build a one-and-a-half-mile concrete road. Trexler then donated roughly thirty acres of land from his trout hatchery, and encouraged friends and other civic leaders to donate portions of their property for use as park land. Among those contributing were the Good Shepherd Home, John Leh, Mrs. Leonard Sefing, and Colonel E. M. Young. The majority of the park's development was ultimately made possible with federal funding and support from the Works Progress Administration, and took place between 1936 and 1940.

Controversy erupted at a city council meeting in January 1971 when a large group of city residents opposed a proposal by the Allentown Council of Youth to sponsor a series of rock concerts at the parkway during the summer of 1972. During that same decade, the Lehigh Valley Audubon Society named the Lehigh Parkway as "an excellent spot to observe vireos, warblers, thrushes, and other birds which prefer a second growth deciduous habitat during the spring migration."

The park features many scenic exercising trails in addition to bridle paths, a shooting range, and many fishing locations. The park includes the Lil-Le-Hi Trout Nursery, which hatches over 30,000 mature trout each year. The Museum of Indian Culture is located in the parkway.

A disc golf course was added in 2005.

In 2017, the Lehigh Parkway was listed by The Morning Call as one of fifteen great places for joggers to run in the Lehigh Valley.

Each Christmas season, the city of Allentown puts on an annual holiday light display in Lehigh Parkway called "Lights in the Parkway".

== See also ==
- List of Allentown neighborhoods
- List of city parks and recreation facilities of Allentown, Pennsylvania
- List of historic places in Allentown, Pennsylvania
