= Neighborhood Improvement Zone =

Current taxing district in Allentown, Pennsylvania

The Neighborhood Improvement Zone (NIZ) is a special taxing district intended to encourage economic development in Allentown, Pennsylvania. This zone has been credited with attracting investment to Allentown but has also been criticized for failing to equitably benefit citizens.

== History ==
=== 20th century ===
Allentown was a center of industrialization during the Industrial Revolution. In the mid- and late-20th century, however, Allentown began facing significant economic decline and deindustrialization, and the city emerged as one of the most notable examples of a Rust Belt city. The departure of manufacturing firms from Allentown contributed to urban decay in the city, making the less attractive to investors. To address this issue, state lawmakers sought to use tax incentives to encourage economic development.

=== 21st century ===
The Neighborhood Improvement Zone was initially established through the passage of 2009 Act 50, 2011 Act 26, 2012 Act 87 by the Pennsylvania General Assembly. These acts enabled 128 acres of Allentown’s urban core to be designated as a special taxing district. The special taxing district includes portions of Center City Allentown and a stretch of the western bank of the Lehigh River, called the Riverfront district.

Developers that initiate projects in the Neighborhood Improvement Zone are eligible to use state and local taxes generated in the zone to finance debt service related to these projects using a tax increment financing method. These tax incentives enable developers to charge rental prices below the market rate which is intended to attract businesses that would otherwise not locate in Allentown. The Neighborhood Improvement Zone differs from conventional tax increment financing schemes in that it enables developers to utilize virtually all state tax revenues collected from any business located in the zone.

In 2013, the Pennsylvania Department of Revenue reported that $48.2 million in state taxes were made available to developers in the Neighborhood Improvement Zone.

==== PPL Center ====
It is estimated that the Neighborhood Improvement Zone has generated $1 billion in development with notable projects, including the Renaissance Allentown Hotel, Strata Flats, Two City Center, and the PPL Center, a 10,000-seat stadium, which hosts the Lehigh Valley Phantoms, an American Hockey League team and the primary developmental team of the Philadelphia Flyers of the National Hockey League.

== Criticism ==
Critics of the Neighborhood Improvement Zone have argued that the economic development it has generated has disproportionately benefited economic elites. Despite the considerable amount of economic investment into Allentown's downtown, census tracts within the Neighborhood Improvement Zone reported an average poverty rate of 39.4% in 2017. The introduction of the zone has enabled developers to use state and local taxes to subsidize developments, with critics arguing that these tax revenues would be better used through more direct interventions to assist economically disadvantaged citizens. It has also been argued that the zone fails to generate lasting economic development and jobs for city residents, with new developments merely representing existing businesses that are relocating to benefit from cheaper rental prices.

Critics have also raised concerns over rising housing prices and gentrification attributed to the Neighborhood Improvement Zone. According to census data, the median rent in census tracts within the Neighborhood Improvement Zone increased by 10.3% between 2013 and 2017, which some attribute to driving out poorer residents who can no longer afford rental prices. Additionally, the majority of developments in the zone are primarily upscale office buildings, apartment buildings, and restaurants which are often inaccessible to poorer local residents.
