= Museum of Indian Culture =

U.S. organization and educational center

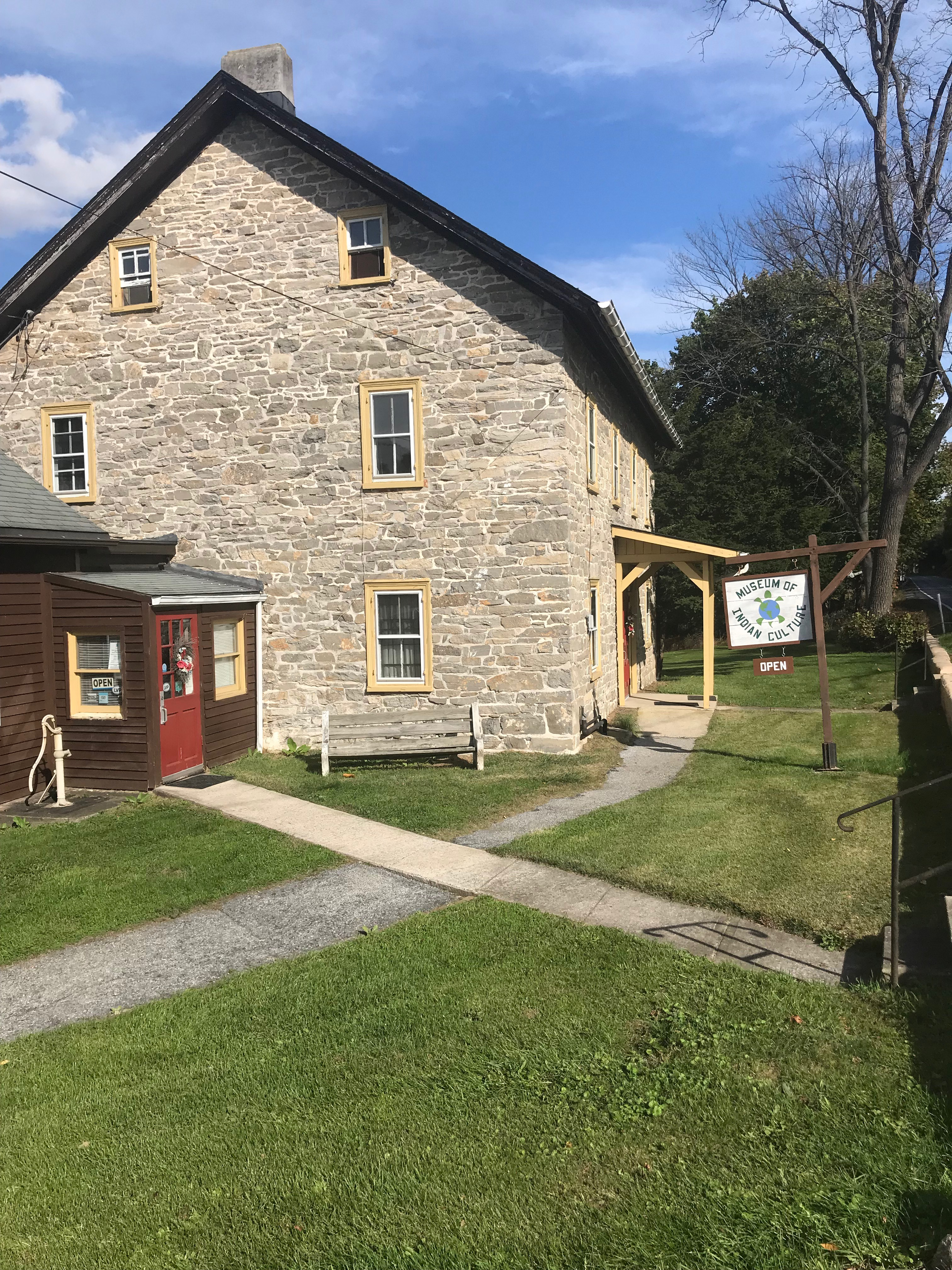
- Museum of Indian Culture in October 2017
- Former name: Lenni Lenape Historical Society's Museum of Indian Culture
- Established: 1980
- Location: 2825 Fish Hatchery Road; Allentown, Pennsylvania, U.S.
- Coordinates: 40.572762°N 75.504313°W
- Type: Cultural
- Director: Pat Rivera
- Curator: Lee Hallman
- Website: www.museumofindianculture.org

The Museum of Indian Culture is a 501(c)(3) non-profit organization and educational center in Allentown, Pennsylvania.

Founded in 1980, the center is dedicated to presenting, preserving, and perpetuating the history of the Lenape and other Northeastern Woodland Indian cultures. The Museum of Indian Culture is located in the Lehigh Parkway at 2825 Fish Hatchery Road in Allentown.

== History ==
The Museum of Indian Culture was originally founded as the Lenni Lenape Historical Society's Museum of Indian Culture in 1980, the oldest exclusively Native American museum in Pennsylvania, with a focus on educating Pennsylvanians on the state's indigenous people.

The museum was founded by Dorothy Schiavone and her daughter, Carla Messinger. The building in which the museum is located is a historic Pennsylvania German stone farm house and two-story stone spring house built by the Bieber family around 1750.

After a change in administration in 2003, the museum sought to improve community relations between local federal government and federally recognized Native American tribes. In 2005, the museum was renamed. The museum has diversified by including exhibits from tribes across the western hemisphere.

The museum serves as a tool to help with Native American research and as way to educate people on Native American tribes. The museum hosts festivals and offers tours and community outreach programs to educate on Native American culture and history.

== Exhibits ==
The Museum of Indian Culture houses a diverse collection of Native American items, including stone tools, ceramics, carvings, photographs, weapons, beadwork, and basketry. Artifacts originate from across North America and include a Californian Hupa basket collection, a Mexican Aztec ceremonial clothing display, and a stone tool assortment from a Lenape tribe in Pennsylvania.

One focus of the collection is the set of artefacts discovered by amateur archeologists Frank Sterling, Paul Delgrego, and W. W. Venney, who stumbled across the Broomall Rock Shelters after finding a skeleton in one of them. More than 3,000 years ago, Lenape Indians sought protection from the cold and rain in these shelters. An exhibit at the museum features artifacts from the shelters.

== See also ==
- List of historic places in Allentown, Pennsylvania
- Native Americans in the United States
