= American Parkway =

Street in Allentown, Pennsylvania, United States

- Location: Allentown, Pennsylvania, U.S.
- South end: Hamilton Street in Allentown
- Major junctions: Front Street in Allentown; Airport Road in Allentown
- East end: Nelson and Columbia streets in Allentown

The American Parkway is an arterial street in Allentown, Pennsylvania. The street connects Center City Allentown with Pennsylvania Route 987, U.S. Route 22, and Lehigh Valley International Airport.

The road existed in incomplete form in two segments for over 25 years from Center City Allentown at Hamilton Street to Front Street and then on the east side of the Lehigh River from North Dauphin Street east to Nelson and Columbia Streets until the American Parkway Bridge was completed on November 24, 2015.

The first two segments of the parkway were built by 1988. The bridge over the Lehigh River that was completed in 2015 was first proposed in the 1960s.

== Route description ==
=== Center City Allentown segment ===
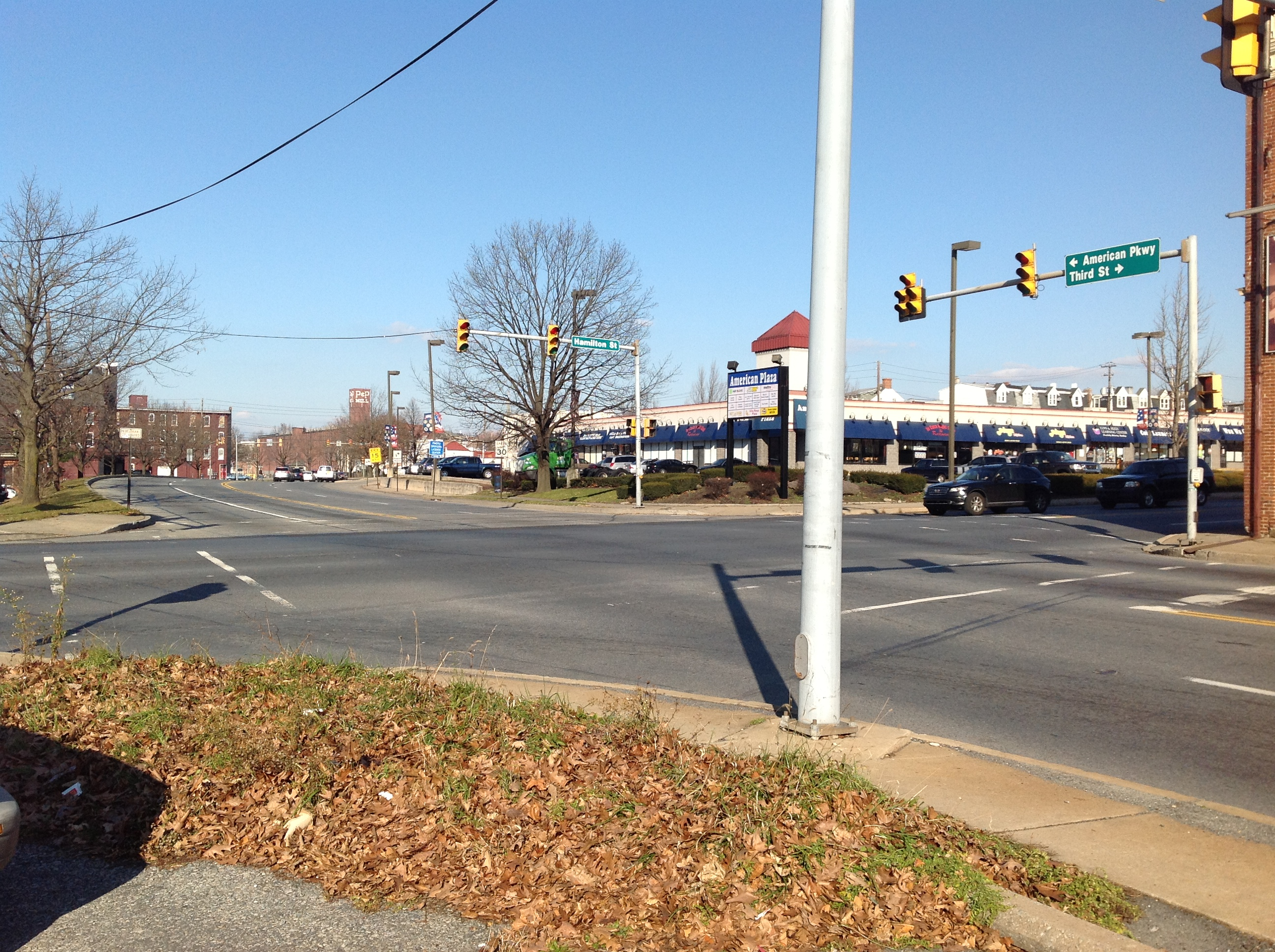
Beginning of American Parkway in Center City Allentown

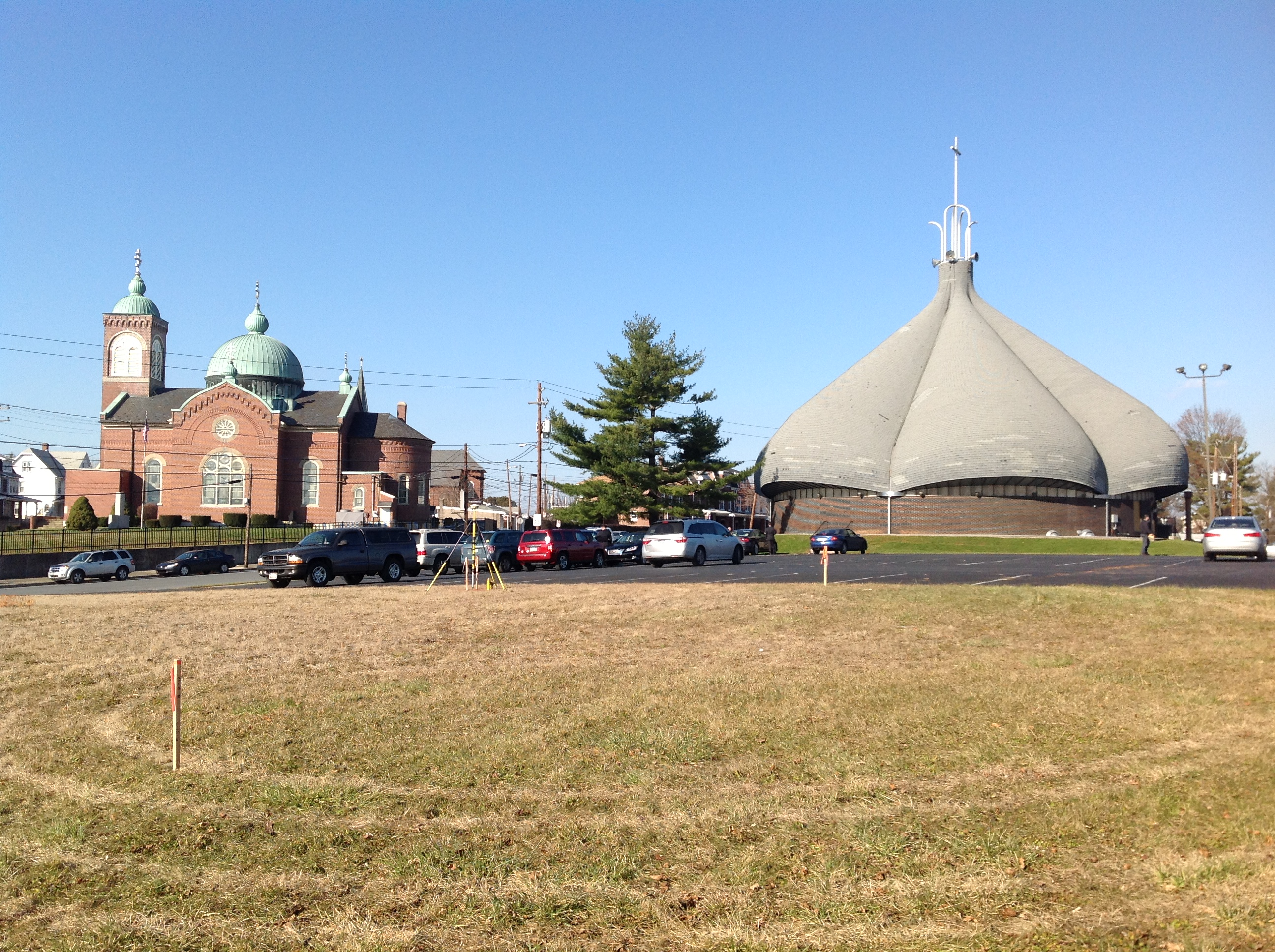
St. Mary's Protection Ukrainian Church (left) and St. George's Orthodox Church (right) on North Front Street in Allentown

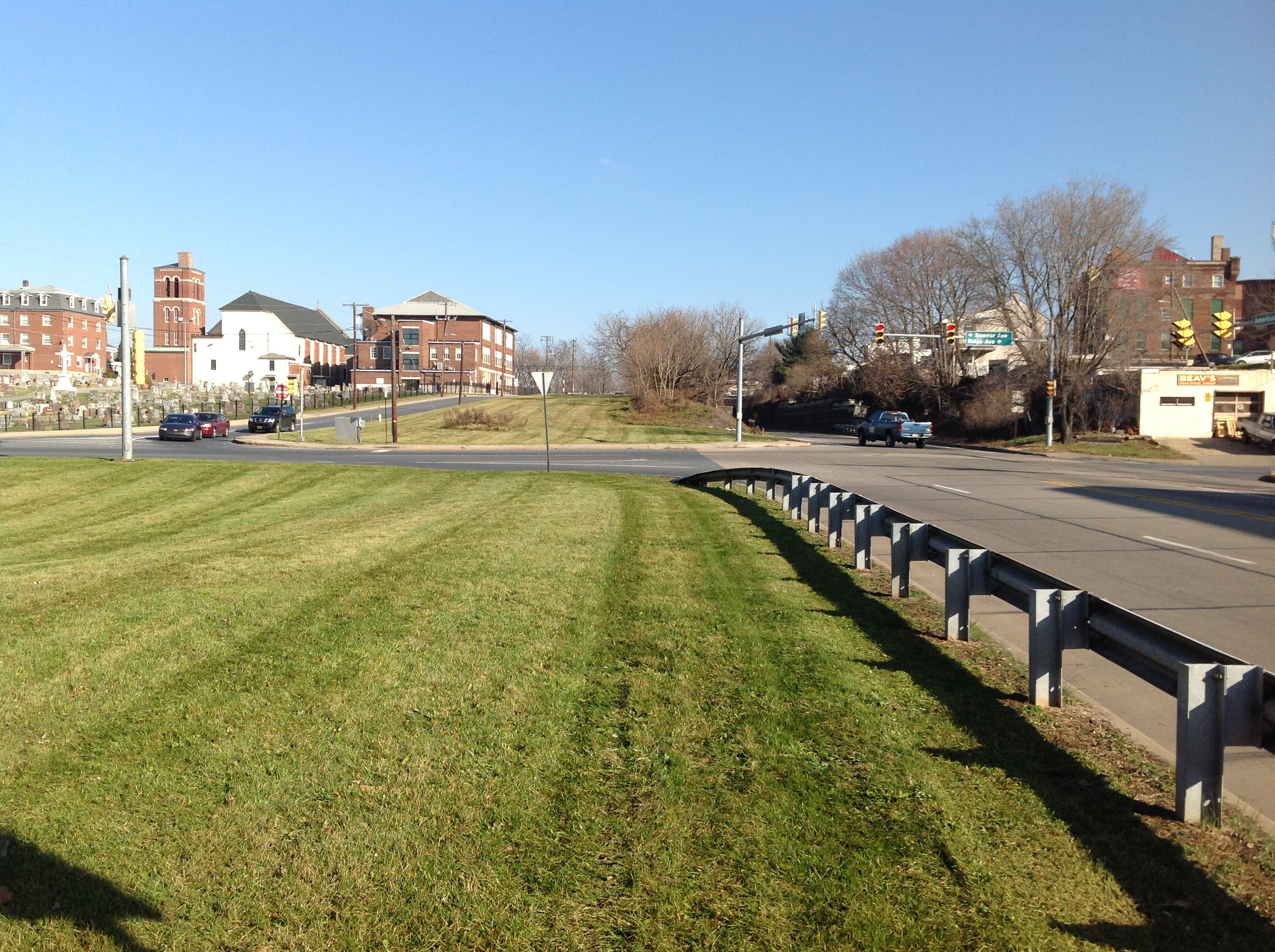
American Parkway's right-of-way at Sumner Avenue and Ridge Avenue in Allentown

The segment of American Parkway in Center City Allentown extends from Hamilton Street north to North Front Street near the Lehigh River, skirting the eastern edge of Allentown's Center City area and the valley of the Jordan Creek. Major crossings after Hamilton Street and the Allentown Bus Terminal are Linden Street (one-way westbound) and Gordon Street. The American Parkway passes underneath Tilghman Street without intersecting it, and follows Jordan Creek in a northeastern direction along the former R.J. Corman Railroad's Allentown Line. Until November 2015, it terminated at Front Street.

=== Northeast segment ===
The northeast segment of American Parkway was built on former Lehigh and New England Railroad right-of-way. It began at North Dauphin Street (Pennsylvania Route 1007) above the east bank of the Lehigh River and continued to the northeast past a partial intersection with Business Park Lane and a full intersection with LSI Way and Ironpigs Way. Subsequent intersections are at Irving Street (State Route 1005) and Airport Road. American Parkway continues along the Lehigh and New England Railroad right-of-way approximately one-quarter mile to its intersection with Nelson and Columbia Streets.

== History ==
The idea for a link to Center City Allentown to then-Interstate 78/Lehigh Valley Thruway, now U.S. Route 22, was launched in the 1960s, when I-178 was proposed to link from what was then I-78, but was cancelled due to local opposition in 1971. Another proposal was for Route 145 to link Center City Allentown, and the Thruway were abandoned.

In late 1978, The Morning Call reported that a proposal existed to build an expressway beginning at Basin Street south of downtown, passing north and east through the center city area, crossing the Lehigh River, and continuing to Airport Road adjacent to an existing interchange with the Lehigh Valley Thruway. By 1988, the completed center city section of American Parkway connected North Front Street with Hamilton Street. The northeastern section of the parkway was built in approximately 2001, but funding was not available to complete the city's dream for a fast link between the Lehigh Valley Thruway and Center City Allentown.

=== American Parkway Bridge ===
In November 2015, the American Parkway bridge opened. The bridge is approximately one mile in length, and represents the city's third crossing of the Lehigh River. Tilghman Street Bridge (1,660 feet in length) and Hamilton Street Bridge (315 feet in length) to the south are the other links between the eastern and western parts of the city. The Tilghman Street bridge was constructed in 1929, and the current Hamilton Street bridge was opened to traffic in 1959, and rebuilt and re-opened on June 19, 1973.

At the end of 2012, funding and property to construct the bridge and its approaches was secured, and a contract was initiated with New Enterprise Stone and Lime of New Enterprise in Bedford County, Pennsylvania to build the span.

On December 14, 2012, then Allentown mayor Ed Pawlowski hosted a groundbreaking ceremony at the bridge's anticipated eastern landing, which included Allentown-area elected officials at the time and members of the public.

In November 2015, Pawlowski hosted a ribbon-cutting opening for the bridge, which linked Center City Allentown to U.S. Route 22 and Lehigh Valley International Airport, the fourth-busiest airport in Pennsylvania. A video showing the westbound drive along the full alignment of American Parkway was published on November 30, 2015.
