= Center City Allentown =

Center City Central Business District
- Neighborhood
- The skyline of Center City Allentown in 2026
- Interactive map of Center City
- Coordinates: 40.608671°N 75.49043°W
- Country: United States
- State: Pennsylvania
- County: Lehigh County
- City: Allentown

Area
  - Total: 6.271 sq mi (16.24 km^{2})

Population (2017)
  - Total: 53,548
  - Density: 8,539/sq mi (3,297/km^{2})

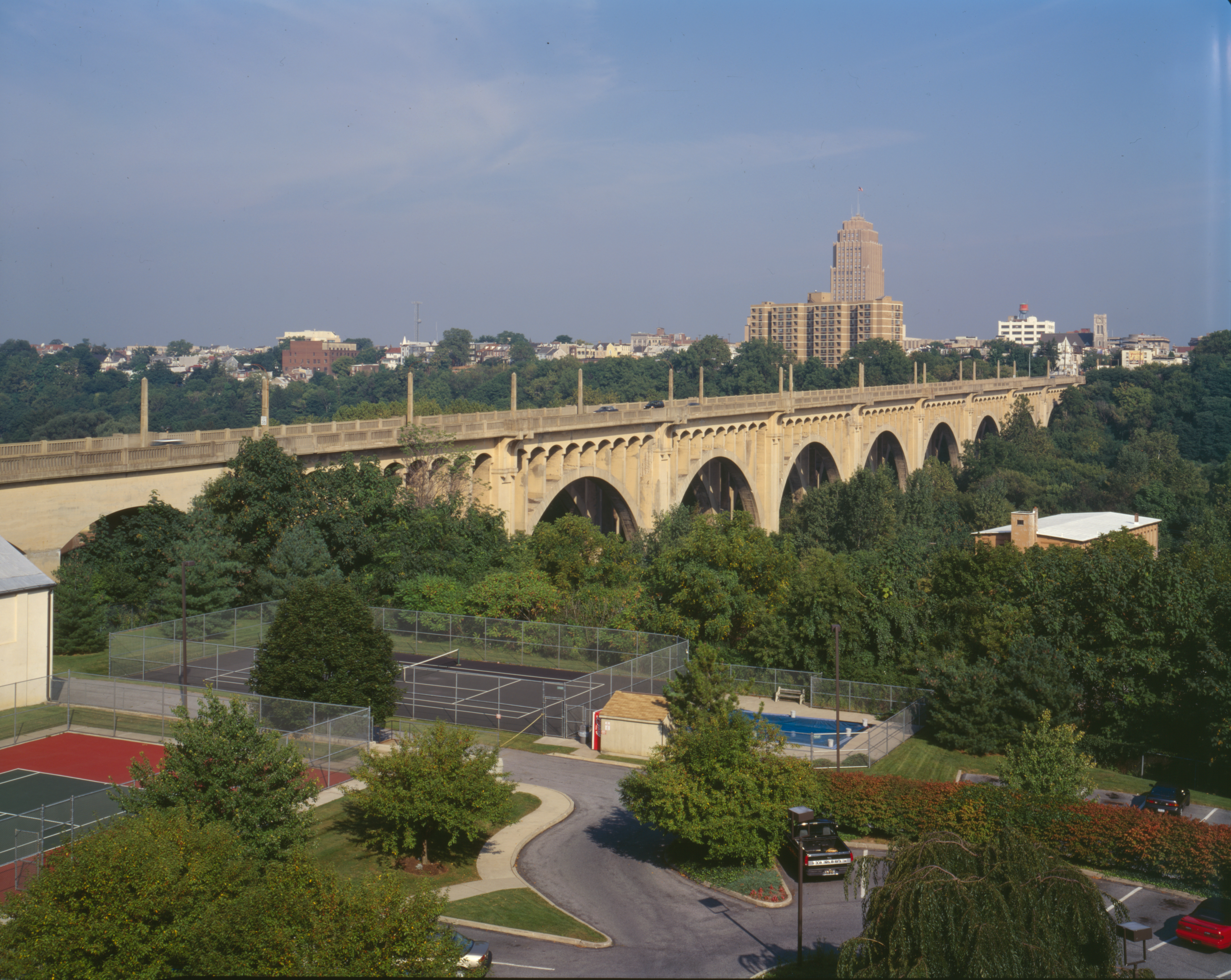
Albertus L. Meyers Bridge (in foreground) and the skyline of Center City Allentown, including the PPL Building (in background), in May 2007

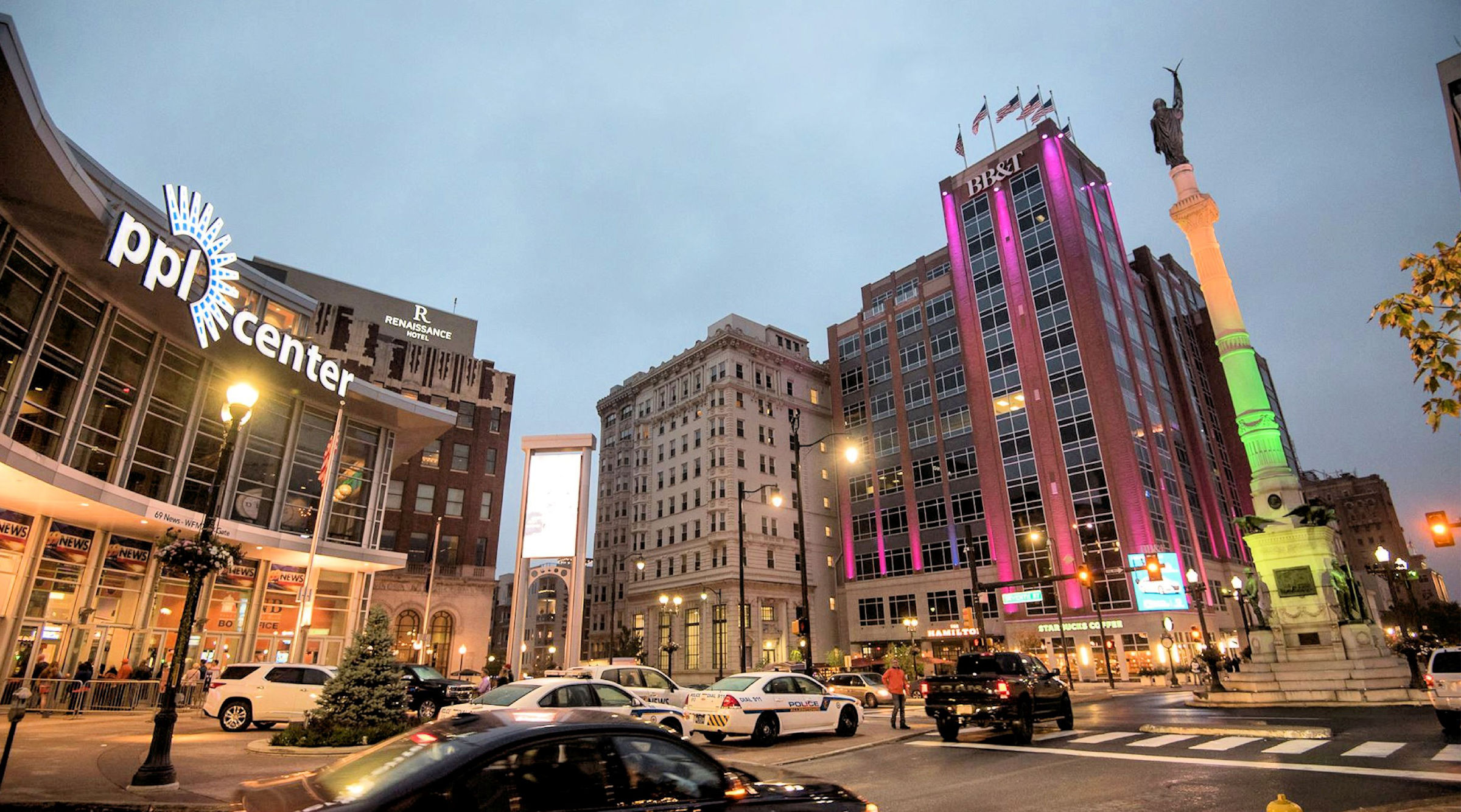
Entrance to the PPL Center (on left) at 701 Hamilton Street in Center City Allentown in October 2018

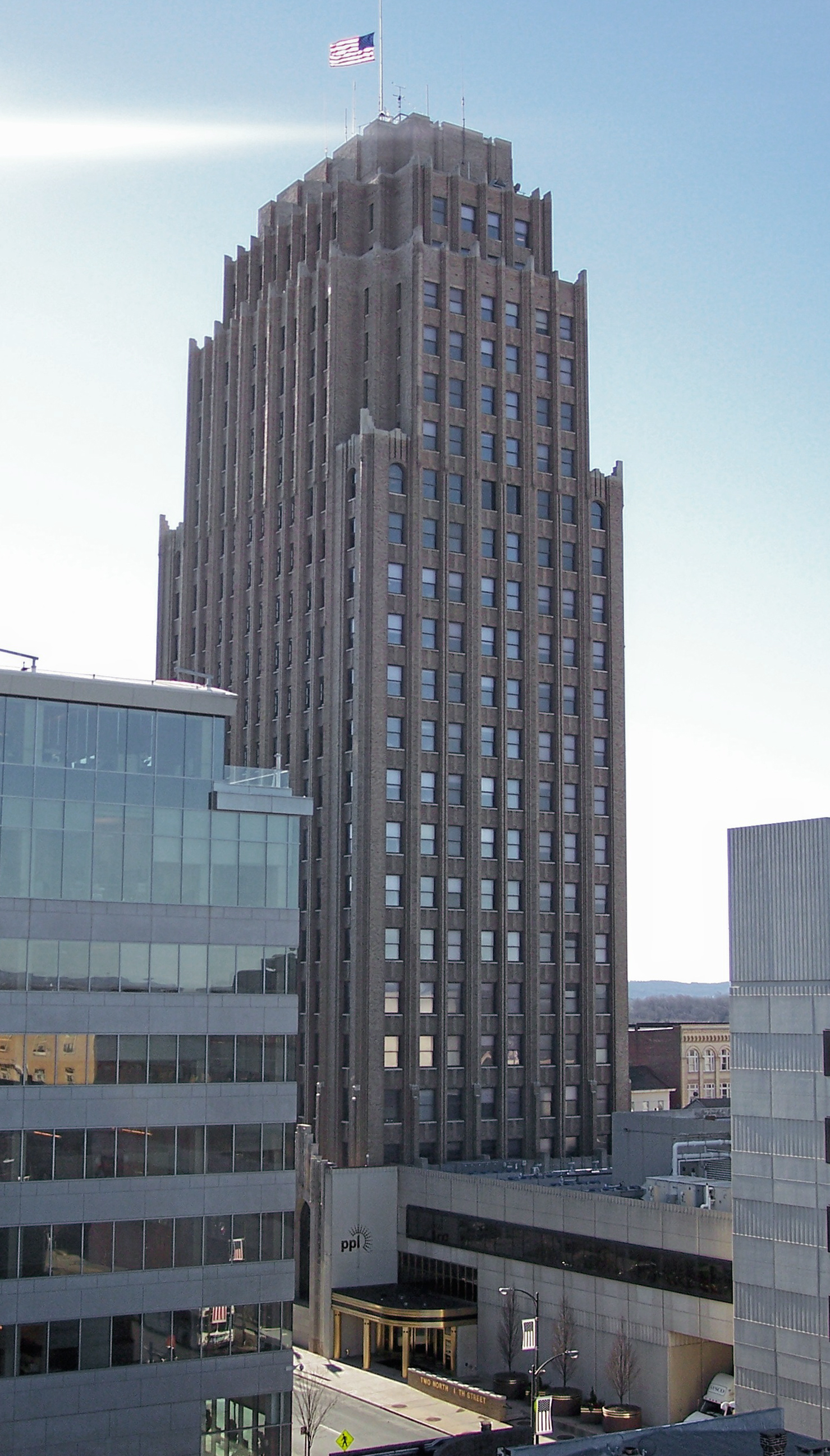
The 24-story PPL Building, Center City Allentown's tallest building, at 2 North 9th Street in January 2007

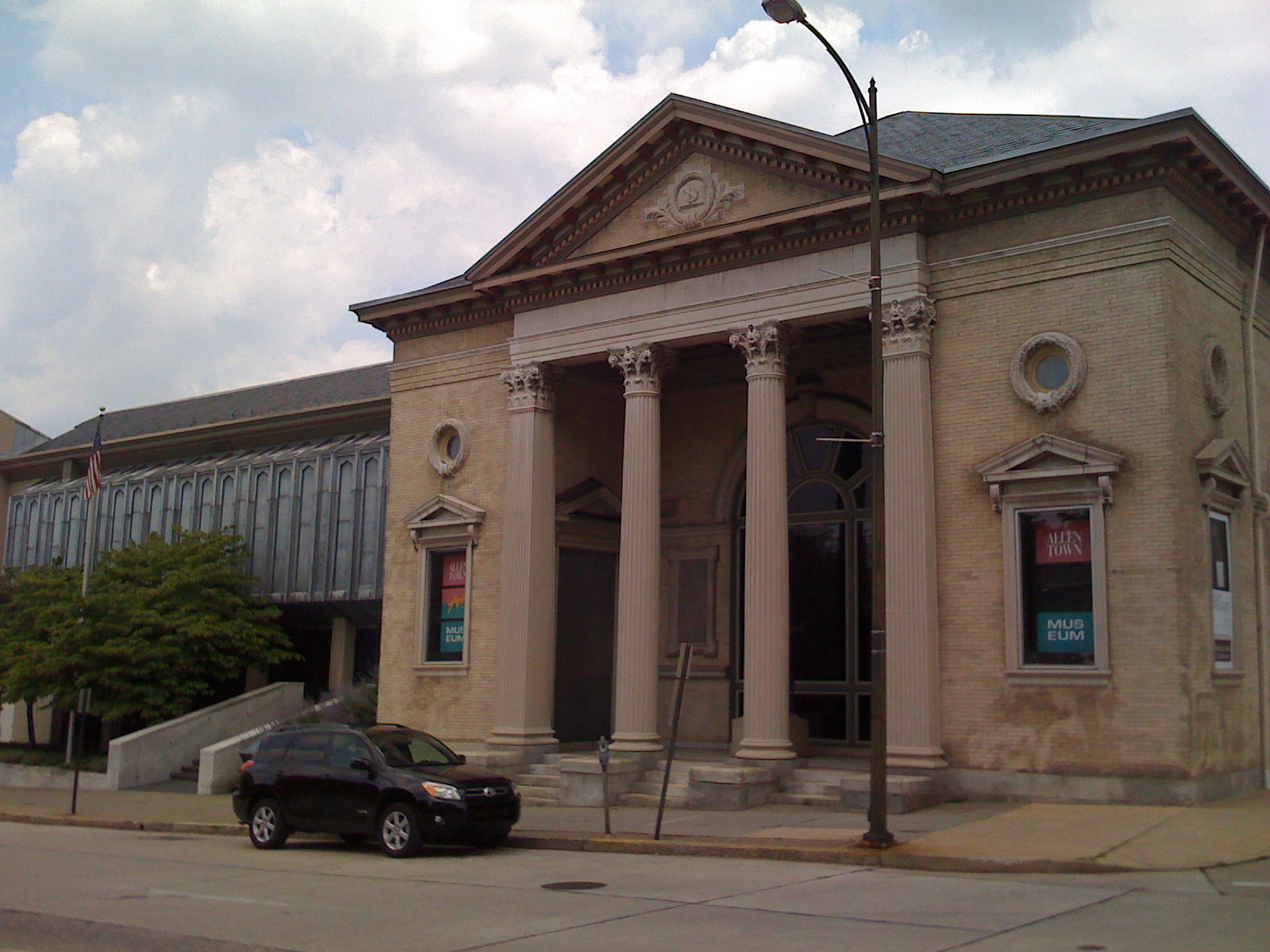
Allentown Art Museum on North 5th Street in Center City Allentown in July 2008

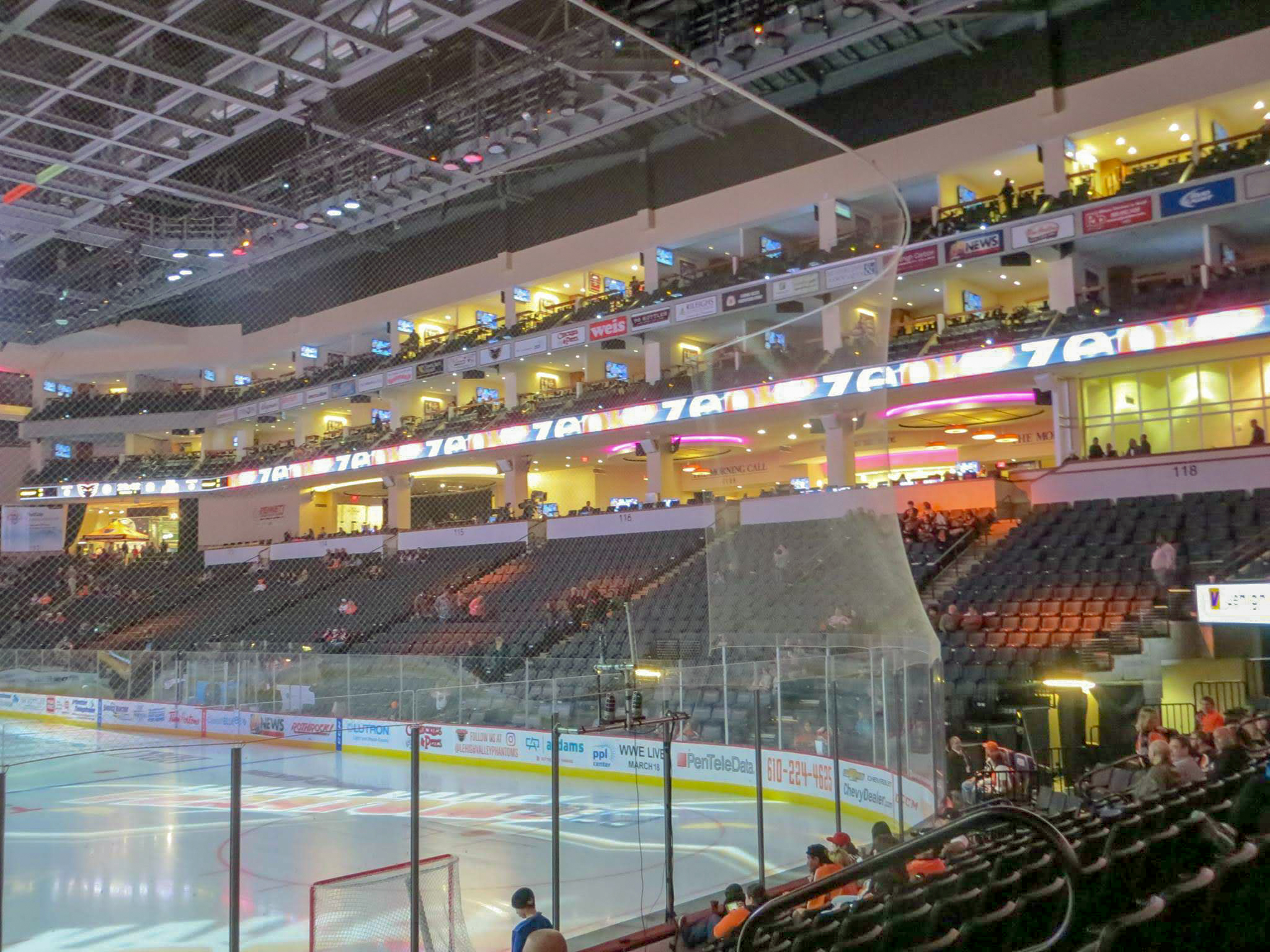
PPL Center in Center City Allentown, the home arena of the Lehigh Valley Phantoms, the primary development team of the National Hockey League's Philadelphia Flyers

Center City Allentown is the downtown and central business district of Allentown, Pennsylvania, the third-largest city in the U.S. state of Pennsylvania. It has a dense population and is currently undergoing an urban revitalization process.

== Boundaries ==
Allentown's Center City is generally defined as the area centered around Hamilton and 7th Streets, bordered by the Jordan Creek to the east, Martin Luther King Jr. Drive to the south, the city line with Whitehall Township to the north, and 15th Street to the west.

== Demographics ==
Center City's population based on a 2007 estimate was 53,548. Center City is defined as 6.271 sq. mi., making the population density 8539/square miles.

== Neighborhood features ==
Center City's tallest building is the PPL Building at 322 ft (98 m). The Allentown Art Museum, Miller Symphony Hall, the former site of Hess's Department Stores' original and flagship store, Baum School of Art, Lehigh County Historical Society and Heritage Museum are Center City landmarks.

An 8,500-capacity indoor arena, PPL Center, opened in August 2014, and is the home arena for the Lehigh Valley Phantoms, the primary development team of the Philadelphia Flyers of the National Hockey League.

== Neighborhoods ==
Center City Allentown includes four residential neighborhoods: Seventh Street, Downtown, Old Allentown, Old Fairgrounds District, and North of Tilghman Street (NOTI).

== Economy ==
Center City is home to the corporate headquarters of PPL Corporation, a New York Stock Exchange-traded company with over 6,500 employees and $7.9 billion in annual revenue as of 2022.

== Education ==
Center City Allentown is part of the Allentown School District, one of the largest public school districts in Pennsylvania that manages the district's two large public high schools, four middle schools, 17 elementary schools, and one charter school.

=== High schools ===
- Allen High School
- Dieruff High School

=== Middle schools ===
- Francis D. Raub Middle School
- Harrison-Morton Middle School
- South Mountain Middle School
- Trexler Middle School

=== Elementary schools ===
- Central Elementary School
- Cleveland Elementary School
- Hiram Dodd Elementary School
- Jackson Elementary School
- Jefferson Elementary School
- Lehigh Parkway Elementary School
- Lincoln Elementary School
- Luis A. Ramos Elementary School
- McKinley Elementary School
- Mosser Elementary School
- Midway Manor Elementary School
- Muhlenberg Elementary School
- Ritter Elementary School
- Roosevelt Elementary School
- Sheridan Elementary School
- Union Terrace Elementary School
- Washington Elementary School

=== Charter schools ===
- Roberto Clemente Charter School

=== Private schools ===
- Allentown Central Catholic High School
- Cathedral of St. Catharine of Siena School
- Holy Spirit School
- Mercy Special Learning Center
- Sacred Heart School
- St. Francis of Assisi School

== See also ==
- Allentown, Pennsylvania
- List of Allentown neighborhoods
- List of people from the Lehigh Valley
