= Index of Pennsylvania-related articles =

Location of Pennsylvania in the United States

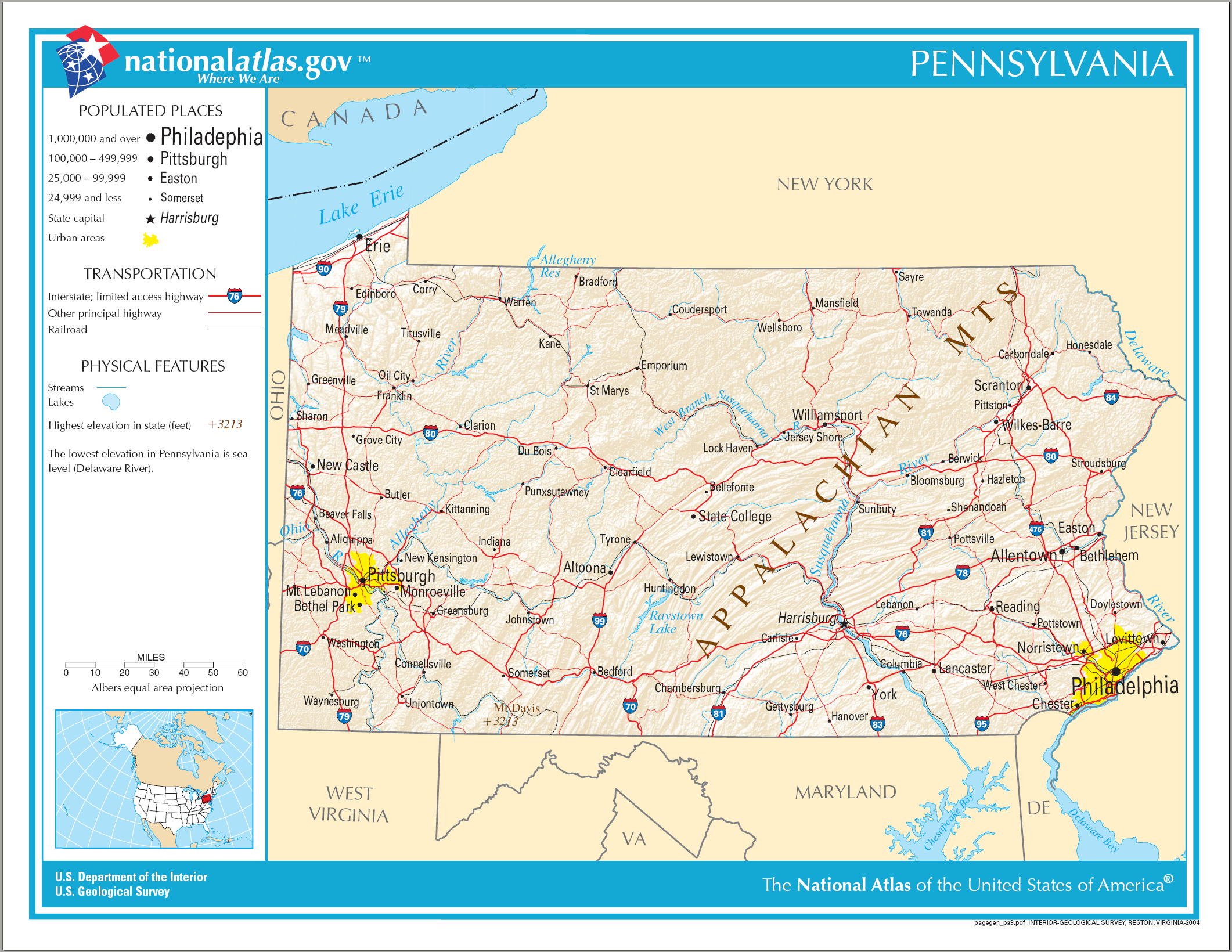
An enlargeable map of Pennsylvania

The following is an alphabetical list of articles on people, places, and things related to Pennsylvania in the United States.

== 0–9 ==
- .pa.us – Internet second-level domain for Pennsylvania
- 2nd State to ratify the Constitution of the United States
- 30th Street Station
- 1st Pennsylvania Infantry Regiment
- 2nd Pennsylvania Infantry Regiment
- 4th Pennsylvania Infantry Regiment
- 11th Pennsylvania Infantry Regiment
- 12th Pennsylvania Infantry Regiment
- 17th Pennsylvania Infantry Regiment
- 20th Pennsylvania Infantry Regiment
- 23rd Pennsylvania Infantry Regiment
- 25th Pennsylvania Infantry Regiment
- 26th Pennsylvania Infantry Regiment
- 27th Pennsylvania Infantry Regiment
- 28th Pennsylvania Infantry Regiment
- 29th Pennsylvania Infantry Regiment
- 45th Pennsylvania Infantry Regiment
- 46th Pennsylvania Infantry Regiment
- 47th Pennsylvania Infantry Regiment
- 48th Pennsylvania Infantry Regiment
- 49th Pennsylvania Infantry Regiment
- 50th Pennsylvania Infantry Regiment
- 51st Pennsylvania Infantry Regiment
- 52nd Pennsylvania Infantry Regiment
- 53rd Pennsylvania Infantry Regiment
- 54th Pennsylvania Infantry Regiment
- 55th Pennsylvania Infantry Regiment
- 56th Pennsylvania Infantry Regiment
- 57th Pennsylvania Infantry Regiment
- 58th Pennsylvania Infantry Regiment
- 61st Pennsylvania Infantry Regiment
- 62nd Pennsylvania Infantry Regiment
- 63rd Pennsylvania Infantry Regiment
- 68th Pennsylvania Infantry Regiment
- 69th Pennsylvania Infantry Regiment
- 71st Pennsylvania Infantry Regiment
- 72nd Pennsylvania Infantry Regiment
- 73rd Pennsylvania Infantry Regiment
- 74th Pennsylvania Infantry Regiment
- 75th Pennsylvania Infantry Regiment
- 76th Pennsylvania Infantry Regiment
- 77th Pennsylvania Infantry Regiment
- 78th Pennsylvania Infantry Regiment
- 79th Pennsylvania Infantry Regiment
- 81st Pennsylvania Infantry Regiment
- 82nd Pennsylvania Infantry Regiment
- 83rd Pennsylvania Infantry Regiment
- 84th Pennsylvania Infantry Regiment
- 85th Pennsylvania Infantry Regiment
- 87th Pennsylvania Infantry Regiment
- 88th Pennsylvania Infantry Regiment
- 90th Pennsylvania Infantry Regiment
- 91st Pennsylvania Infantry Regiment
- 93rd Pennsylvania Infantry Regiment
- 95th Pennsylvania Infantry Regiment
- 96th Pennsylvania Infantry Regiment
- 97th Pennsylvania Infantry Regiment
- 98th Pennsylvania Infantry Regiment
- 99th Pennsylvania Infantry Regiment
- 100th Pennsylvania Infantry Regiment
- 102nd Pennsylvania Infantry Regiment
- 105th Pennsylvania Infantry Regiment
- 106th Pennsylvania Infantry Regiment
- 107th Pennsylvania Infantry Regiment
- 109th Pennsylvania Infantry Regiment
- 110th Pennsylvania Infantry Regiment
- 111th Pennsylvania Infantry Regiment
- 114th Pennsylvania Infantry Regiment
- 115th Pennsylvania Infantry Regiment
- 116th Pennsylvania Infantry Regiment
- 118th Pennsylvania Infantry Regiment
- 119th Pennsylvania Infantry Regiment
- 121st Pennsylvania Infantry Regiment
- 123rd Pennsylvania Infantry Regiment
- 124th Pennsylvania Infantry Regiment
- 125th Pennsylvania Infantry Regiment
- 126th Pennsylvania Infantry Regiment
- 127th Pennsylvania Infantry Regiment
- 128th Pennsylvania Infantry Regiment
- 129th Pennsylvania Infantry Regiment
- 130th Pennsylvania Infantry Regiment
- 131st Pennsylvania Infantry Regiment
- 132nd Pennsylvania Infantry Regiment
- 133rd Pennsylvania Infantry Regiment
- 134th Pennsylvania Infantry Regiment
- 136th Pennsylvania Infantry Regiment
- 137th Pennsylvania Infantry Regiment
- 138th Pennsylvania Infantry Regiment
- 139th Pennsylvania Infantry Regiment
- 140th Pennsylvania Infantry Regiment
- 141st Pennsylvania Infantry Regiment
- 142nd Pennsylvania Infantry Regiment
- 143rd Pennsylvania Infantry Regiment
- 145th Pennsylvania Infantry Regiment
- 147th Pennsylvania Infantry Regiment
- 148th Pennsylvania Infantry Regiment
- 149th Pennsylvania Infantry Regiment
- 150th Pennsylvania Infantry Regiment
- 151st Pennsylvania Infantry Regiment
- 153rd Pennsylvania Infantry Regiment
- 154th Pennsylvania Infantry Regiment
- 157th Pennsylvania Infantry Regiment
- 165th Pennsylvania Infantry Regiment
- 166th Pennsylvania Infantry Regiment
- 172nd Pennsylvania Infantry Regiment
- 173rd Pennsylvania Infantry Regiment
- 174th Pennsylvania Infantry Regiment
- 175th Pennsylvania Infantry Regiment
- 183rd Pennsylvania Infantry Regiment
- 186th Pennsylvania Infantry Regiment
- 184th Pennsylvania Infantry Regiment
- 190th Pennsylvania Infantry Regiment
- 191st Pennsylvania Infantry Regiment
- 192nd Pennsylvania Infantry Regiment
- 196th Pennsylvania Infantry Regiment
- 197th Pennsylvania Infantry Regiment
- 198th Pennsylvania Infantry Regiment
- 199th Pennsylvania Infantry Regiment
- 200th Pennsylvania Infantry Regiment
- 201st Pennsylvania Infantry Regiment
- 202nd Pennsylvania Infantry Regiment
- 205th Pennsylvania Infantry Regiment
- 206th Pennsylvania Infantry Regiment
- 207th Pennsylvania Infantry Regiment
- 210th Pennsylvania Infantry Regiment
- 211th Pennsylvania Infantry Regiment
- 213th Pennsylvania Infantry Regiment
- 214th Pennsylvania Infantry Regiment
- 215th Pennsylvania Infantry Regiment

== A ==
- Abortion in Pennsylvania
- Adjacent states and province:
  - Province of Ontario (Canada)
  - State of Delaware
  - State of Maryland
  - State of New Jersey
  - State of New York
  - State of Ohio
  - State of West Virginia
- Afflerbach, Roy
- Agere Systems
- Aguilera, Christina
- Air Products
- Allegheny College
- Alburtis
- Alexander, George Warren
- Allen, William
- Allentown
  - Allentown Art Museum
  - Allentown Band
  - Allentown Central Catholic High School
  - Allentown culture
  - Allentown Fairgrounds
  - Allentown historic places
  - Allentown Queen City Municipal Airport
  - "Allentown", the song by Billy Joel
  - Allentown Symphony Orchestra
- All the Right Moves
- Altoona
- Amato, Chuck
- America on Wheels
- Amish
- Ancient Oaks
- Andretti, Jeff
- Andretti, John
- Andretti, Mario
- Andretti, Michael
- Andrews, William
- Angle, Kurt
- Amusement parks in Pennsylvania
- Ann, Lisa
- Anoa'i Jr., Afa
- Aponavicius, Steve
- Appalachia
- Aquaria in Pennsylvania
  - commons:Category:Aquaria in Pennsylvania
- Arboreta in Pennsylvania
  - commons:Category:Arboreta in Pennsylvania
- Category:Archaeological sites in Pennsylvania
- Archaeological sites on the National Register of Historic Places in Pennsylvania
    - commons:Category:Archaeological sites in Pennsylvania
- Area codes 610, 484, and 835
- Art museums and galleries in Pennsylvania
  - commons:Category:Art museums and galleries in Pennsylvania
- Astronomical observatories in Pennsylvania
- Avondale Mine Disaster
- Avonworth High School

== B ==
- Bach Choir of Bethlehem
- Bader, David
- Barkley, Saquon
- Barrett, Stephen
- Bates, Samuel Penniman
- Battle of Brandywine
- Battle of Carlisle
- Battle of Germantown
- Battle of Gettysburg
- Battle of Hanover
- Battle of Hunterstown
- Battle of Sporting Hill
- Baum School of Art
- Bauman, Christian
- Bausman, Karen
- Bear Creek Mountain Resort
- Beaver Falls
- Bednarik, Chuck
- Behe, Michael
- Benet, Stephen Vincent
- Berks County
- Berninger, John E.
- Bethlehem
- Bethlehem Catholic High School
- Bethlehem Steel
- Bicycle routes in Pennsylvania
- Bierbauer, Charles
- Biery, James Soloman
- Biletnikoff, Fred
- Bilger's rocks
- Biermelin, John
- Blackman, Steve
- Blank, Clair
- Bloomsburg University of Pennsylvania
- Blue Mountain
- Boehret, Katherine
- Booker, Chakaia
- Booros, Jim
- Botanical gardens in Pennsylvania
  - commons:Category:Botanical gardens in Pennsylvania
- Boyz II Men
- Braden Airpark
- Brady, Kyle
- Braun, Rick
- Breaking Benjamin
- Briggs, Lillian
- Browne, Thom
- Bryant, Jen
- Bryant, Kobe
- Bryn Mawr
- Bryn Mawr College
- Buchman, Frank
- Buckeye Partners
- Bucks County
- Buesgen, Karl
- Buildings and architecture of Allentown, Pennsylvania
- Buildings and structures in Pennsylvania
  - commons:Category:Buildings and structures in Pennsylvania
- Burrell, Leroy
- Bustill family
  - Bustill, Cyrus
  - Bowser, David Bustill
  - Douglass, Robert Jr.
  - Douglass, Sarah Mapps
  - Mossell, Gertrude Bustill
  - Robeson, Paul
  - Smith, Anna Bustill
- Butler, Ian "Rocky"

== C ==
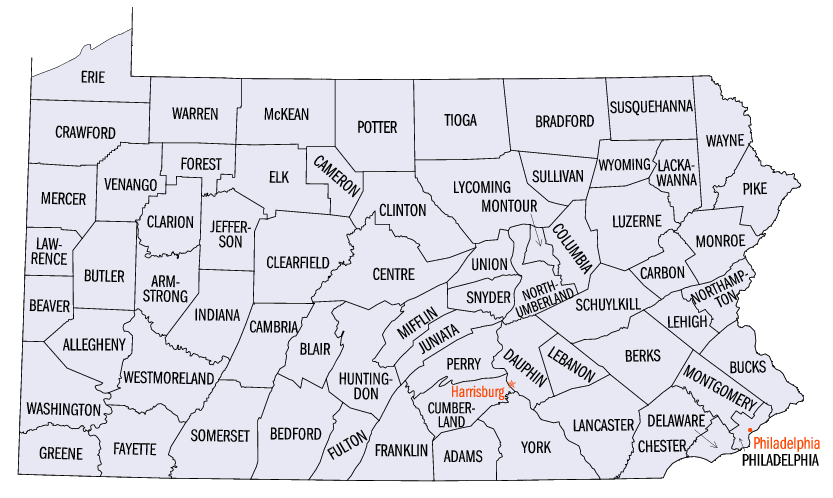
An enlargeable map of the 67 counties of the Commonwealth of Pennsylvania

- Calipari, John
- Canyons and gorges of Pennsylvania
  - commons:Category:Canyons and gorges of Pennsylvania
- Capital of the Commonwealth of Pennsylvania
- Capitol of the Commonwealth of Pennsylvania
  - commons:Category:Pennsylvania State Capitol
- Cappelletti, John
- Carbon County
- Carlisle
- Carr, Leon
- Caruso, Francesco
- Casinos in Pennsylvania
- Catasauqua
  - Catasauqua High School
  - Catasauqua Area School District
- Cattell, James McKeen
- Caves of Pennsylvania
  - commons:Category:Caves of Pennsylvania
- Cedar Crest Boulevard
- Cedar Crest College
- Census statistical areas in Pennsylvania
- Central Bucks School District
- Center City Allentown
- Central Dauphin High School
- Central High School (Philadelphia)
- Centralia
- C. F. Martin & Company
- Chamberlain, Wilt
- Chando, Alexandra
- Charles Evans Cemetery
- Cheltenham High School
- Chester
- Citizens for Pennsylvania's Future
- Civic Theatre of Allentown
- Civil War
- Climate of Pennsylvania
  - Category:Climate of Pennsylvania
    - commons:Category:Climate of Pennsylvania
- Coal Region
- Coates, Thomas
- Coca-Cola Park
- Coleman, Jack
- Colleges and universities in Pennsylvania
- Colony of Pennsylvania
- Commonwealth of Pennsylvania website
  - Government of the Commonwealth of Pennsylvania
    - Category:Government of Pennsylvania
      - commons:Category:Government of Pennsylvania
- Communications in Pennsylvania
  - commons:Category:Communications in Pennsylvania
- Continental Congress
- Convention centers in Pennsylvania
  - commons:Category:Convention centers in Pennsylvania
- Coopersburg
- Coplay Cement Company Kilns
- Cosmides, Leda
- Cosby, Bill
- Counties of Pennsylvania
- Cowher, Bill
- Crater, Joseph Force
- Crayola
- Culture of Pennsylvania
  - commons:Category:Pennsylvania culture
- Cumberland Valley
- Cumberland Valley High School
- Cunningham, James B.
- William F. Curtis Arboretum

== D ==
- Daly, Chuck
- Daniel, George
- Davenport, Russell
- Da Vinci Science Center
- Davis, Parke H.
- Dean, John
- Declaration of Independence
- The Deer Hunter
- DeGrasso, Jimmy
- Delaware River
- DeLong, Solomon
- Demographics of Pennsylvania
  - Category:Demographics of Pennsylvania
- Dent, Charlie
- DeSales University
- Devon
- Diehl, Richard
- Dieruff High School
- Ditka, Mike
- Dixon, Don
- Doom, Omar
- Dorney, Keith
- Dorney Park & Wildwater Kingdom
- Dorsett, Tony
- Dotson, Jahan
- Drake, Edwin

== E ==
- Eastern Pennsylvania Conference
- Easton
- Easton Area High School
  - The Streak (Easton High School Wrestling)
- East Penn School District
- East Texas
- Economy of Pennsylvania
  - Category:Economy of Pennsylvania
    - commons:Category:Economy of Pennsylvania
- Education in Pennsylvania
  - Category:Education in Pennsylvania
    - commons:Category:Education in Pennsylvania
- Egle, William Henry
- Elections in Pennsylvania
  - Category:Elections in Pennsylvania
    - commons:Category:Elections in Pennsylvania
- Electric Factory
- Ellis School, The
- Emmaus
- Emmaus High School
- Emmerich, Slim
- Category:Environment of Pennsylvania
  - commons:Category:Environment of Pennsylvania
- Erie, Pennsylvania
- Erie Triangle
- Evans, Charles

== F ==
- Farr Building

The Flag of the Commonwealth of Pennsylvania

- Fegley, Oakes
- Festivals in Pennsylvania
  - commons:Category:Festivals in Pennsylvania
- Films and television shows set or shot in Pennsylvania
- Flag of the Commonwealth of Pennsylvania
- Flashdance (film)
- Flynn, Michael
- Fogelsville
- Follett Ice
- Forts in Pennsylvania
  - Category:Forts in Pennsylvania
    - commons:Category:Forts in Pennsylvania
- Fox Learning Systems
- Frakes, Jonathan
- Franklin, Benjamin
- Freedom High School
- Freeman, Buck
- Fuel (band)

== G ==
The Great Seal of the Commonwealth of Pennsylvania

- Geography of Pennsylvania
  - Category:Geography of Pennsylvania
    - commons:Category:Geography of Pennsylvania
- Geology of Pennsylvania
  - Category:Geology of Pennsylvania
    - commons:Category:Geology of Pennsylvania
- George School
- Gerlach, Charles L.
- Gernerd, Fred Benjamin
- Gettysburg
  - Gettysburg Address
  - Gettysburg campaign
  - Gettysburg National Cemetery
- Gettysburg College
- Ghost towns in Pennsylvania
  - Category:Ghost towns in Pennsylvania
    - commons:Category:Ghost towns in Pennsylvania
- Giobbi, Matthew
- Gifford Pinchot State Park
- Glazier, Rick
- Gobin, John Peter Shindel
- Golf clubs and courses in Pennsylvania
- Goodman, Murray H.
- Government of the Commonwealth of Pennsylvania website
  - Category:Government of Pennsylvania
    - commons:Category:Government of Pennsylvania
- Governor of the Commonwealth of Pennsylvania
  - governors
- Grace, Eugene
- Gray, Aaron
- Great Allentown Fair
- Grey Towers National Historic Site
- Griffey, Ken Jr.
- Griffey, Ken Sr.
- Great Seal of the Commonwealth of Pennsylvania
- Groller, Walt
- Gross, Peter Alfred

== H ==
- Hall & Oates
- Hamilton, Richard
- Hamilton Street
- Harris, Mel
- Harrisburg, Pennsylvania, state capital since 1812
  - Harrisburg Academy
  - Harrisburg Area Community College
  - Harrisburg City Islanders
  - Harrisburg International Airport
  - Harrisburg Senators
  - Harrisburg State Hospital
  - Harrisburg University of Science and Technology
- Harrison, Marvin
- Hart, Terry
- Hassler, Alfred
- Hazard, Erskine
- Hazleton
- H.D.
- Heffner, Bob
- Heidecker, Tim
- Hensingersville
- Henley, Althea
- Hergesheimer, Ella Sophonisba
- Heritage railroads in Pennsylvania
  - commons:Category:Heritage railroads in Pennsylvania
- Hershey
- Hersheypark
- Hess, David
- Hess's
- High German Evangelical Reformed Church
- High schools in Pennsylvania
- Highway routes in Pennsylvania
- Hiking trails in Pennsylvania
  - commons:Category:Hiking trails in Pennsylvania
- History of Pennsylvania
  - Historical outline of Pennsylvania
    - Category:History of Pennsylvania
      - commons:Category:History of Pennsylvania
- Hodge, Ruth E.
- Holmes, Larry
- Horton, Frank Reed
- Hospitals in Pennsylvania
- Hostetler, Jeff
- Hrab, George

== I ==
- Iacocca, Lee
- Images of Pennsylvania
  - commons:Category:Pennsylvania
- Independence Hall
- Indiana University of Pennsylvania
- Interstate highway routes in Pennsylvania
  - Interstate 476
  - Interstate 76
  - Interstate 78
  - Interstate 95

== J ==
- Jarrett, Keith
- Jim Thorpe, Pennsylvania
- Johns, Michael
- Johnson, Dwayne
- Johnstown
- Juniata College
- Just Born

== K ==
- Keller, Tim
- Kelly, Grace
- Kelly, Jim
- Kemmerer House
- Kennywood
- Kidman, Billy
- Kim, Daniel Dae
- Kimock, Steve
- Kirkland, Gelsey
- Kline, John
- Kline, Marcus C. L.
- Knauss, Sarah
- Knobbs, Brian
- Knoebels
- Knorr, Nathan Homer
- Kolber, Suzy
- Koppen, Dan
- Kressley, Carson
- Kutztown
- Kutztown University of Pennsylvania
- Kecksburg

== L ==
- Lafayette College
  - Lafayette Leopards
  - Lafayette Leopards football
  - Lafayette Leopards men's basketball
  - Lafayette Leopards men's lacrosse
  - Lafayette Leopards women's basketball
- Lakes of Pennsylvania
  - Lake Erie
  - Lake Muhlenberg
  - commons:Category:Lakes of Pennsylvania
- LaMontagne, Noel
- Lancaster
- Landmarks in Pennsylvania
  - commons:Category:Landmarks in Pennsylvania
- LANta
- Laurel Highlands
- Lavelle, Gary
- Lebanon
- Lehigh Canal
- Lehigh County historic places
- Lehigh County Historical Society
- Lehigh Parkway
- Lehigh River
- Lehigh Street
- Lehigh University
  - Goodman Stadium
  - Lehigh Mountain Hawks
  - Lehigh Mountain Hawks football
  - Lehigh Mountain Hawks men's basketball
  - Lehigh Mountain Hawks men's lacrosse
  - Lehigh Mountain Hawks women's basketball
- Lehigh Valley
  - Lehigh Valley AVA
  - Lehigh Valley College
  - Lehigh Valley Conference
  - Lehigh Valley Health Network
  - Lehigh Valley Hospital–Cedar Crest
  - Lehigh Valley International Airport
  - Lehigh Valley IronPigs
  - Lehigh Valley Outlawz
  - Lehigh Valley Mall
  - Lehigh Valley media
  - Lehigh Valley Phantoms
  - Lehigh Valley Roller Derby
  - Lehigh Valley Zoo
- Lehigh Valley Academy
- Leonard, Herman
- Lepchenko, Varvara
- Ley, Christian
- Liberty Bell Museum
- Lenel, Ludwig
- Lennertz, Christopher
- Lewis, Fred Ewing
- Liberty Bell
- Liberty High School
- Lichtenwalner, Norton Lewis
- Lil Peep
- Lindenmuth, Arlington Nelson
- Lipton, Jonathan
- Lists related to the Commonwealth of Pennsylvania:
  - List of airports in Pennsylvania
  - List of bicycle routes in Pennsylvania
  - List of cathedrals in Pennsylvania
  - List of census statistical areas in Pennsylvania
  - List of cities in Pennsylvania
  - List of colleges and universities in Pennsylvania
  - List of United States congressional districts in Pennsylvania
  - List of counties in Pennsylvania
  - List of dams and reservoirs in Pennsylvania
  - List of films and television shows set or shot in Pennsylvania
  - List of films shot in Pittsburgh
  - List of films shot in the Lehigh Valley
  - List of forts in Pennsylvania
  - List of ghost towns in Pennsylvania
  - List of governors of Pennsylvania
  - List of high schools in Pennsylvania
  - List of highway routes in Pennsylvania
  - List of hospitals in Pennsylvania
  - List of individuals executed in Pennsylvania
  - List of Interstate highway routes in Pennsylvania
  - List of lakes in Pennsylvania
  - List of law enforcement agencies in Pennsylvania
  - List of mayors of Allentown
  - List of mayors of Harrisburg
  - List of mayors of Philadelphia
  - List of mayors of Pittsburgh
  - List of mountain biking areas and trails in Pennsylvania
  - List of municipalities in Pennsylvania
  - List of museums in Pennsylvania
  - List of National Historic Landmarks in Pennsylvania
  - List of newspapers in Pennsylvania
  - List of parking authorities in Pennsylvania
  - List of Pennsylvania firsts
  - List of people from Erie, Pennsylvania
  - List of people from Lancaster County, Pennsylvania
  - List of people from Pennsylvania
  - List of people from Philadelphia
  - List of people from the Lehigh Valley
  - List of people from Pittsburgh
  - List of places in Pennsylvania
  - List of power stations in Pennsylvania
  - List of radio stations in Pennsylvania
  - List of railroads in Pennsylvania
  - List of rail trails in Pennsylvania
  - List of Registered Historic Places in Pennsylvania
  - List of rivers of Pennsylvania
  - List of school districts in Pennsylvania
  - List of sister cities in Pennsylvania
  - List of state and county courthouses in Pennsylvania
  - List of state forests in Pennsylvania
  - List of Pennsylvania weather records
  - List of state highway routes in Pennsylvania
  - List of state parks in Pennsylvania
  - List of state prisons in Pennsylvania
  - List of symbols of the State of Pennsylvania
  - List of television stations in Pennsylvania
  - List of Pennsylvania's congressional delegations
  - List of United States congressional districts in Pennsylvania
  - List of United States representatives from Pennsylvania
  - List of United States senators from Pennsylvania
- Littlestown Area School District
- Litz, Thomas
- Live
- Locust Street
- Lost Children of the Alleghenies
- Lower Macungie Township

== M ==
- Machado, Carmen Maria
- Mack Trucks
- Macungie
- Malvern Preparatory School
- Maps of Pennsylvania
  - commons:Category:Maps of Pennsylvania
- March, Francis
- Marchant, William
- Marciniak, Michelle M.
- Marino, Dan
- Martin, Tyrese
- Mauch Chunk Switchback Railway
- Mayfair Festival of the Arts
- McCaffrey, Ed
- McDonald, Michael
- McGlade, John E.
- McMenamy, Kristen
- Meister, John
- Meyers, Albertus L.
- Micuccui, Kate
- Midgley, Thomas Jr.
- Milinichik, Joe
- Millen, Matt
- Miller, Lara Jill
- Miller, Lucy Kennedy
- Miller, Mulgrew
- Miller Symphony Hall
- Milton Hershey School
- Montgomery County
- Montgomery, Morton L.
- Montana, Joe
- Monuments and memorials in Pennsylvania
  - commons:Category:Monuments and memorials in Pennsylvania
- Moravian Academy
- Moravian University
- The (Allentown) Morning Call
- Mountains of Pennsylvania
  - commons:Category:Mountains of Pennsylvania
- Muhlenberg College
- Mulholland, Terry
- Mullins, Aimee
- Munroe, Randall
- Museums in Pennsylvania
  - Category:Museums in Pennsylvania
    - commons:Category:Museums in Pennsylvania
- Music of Pennsylvania
  - commons:Category:Music of Pennsylvania
  - Musikfest
- Mutis, Jeff

== N ==
- Namath, Joe
  - commons:Category:National Forests of Pennsylvania
- Natural history of Pennsylvania
  - commons:Category:Natural history of Pennsylvania
- National Museum of Industrial History
- Nature centers in Pennsylvania
  - commons:Category:Nature centers in Pennsylvania
- Nazareth
  - The Weight
- Neward, Peter
- New Hope, Pennsylvania
- New York-Newark-Bridgeport, NY-NJ-CT-PA Combined Statistical Area
- New York-Northern New Jersey-Long Island, NY-NJ-PA Metropolitan Statistical Area
- Ng, Irene
- Northern Lehigh High School
- Northampton
- Northern Tier
- Northampton County historic places
- Northumberland County Historical Society
- Northwestern Lehigh School District
- Northwest Region
- Northstein, Marty
- Novack, Sandra

== O ==
- O'Connell, Aaron D.
- Ohio River
- Old Zionsville
- Olson, Alix
- Olympus Corporation
- OraSure Technologies
- Outdoor sculptures in Pennsylvania
  - commons:Category:Outdoor sculptures in Pennsylvania

== P ==
- PA – United States Postal Service postal code for the Commonwealth of Pennsylvania
- Packer, Billy
- Palmer Park Mall
- Parkenfarker, Farley
- Parkettes National Gymnastics Training Center
- Parkland High School
- Penn Central
- Penn State Lehigh Valley
- Pennsyltucky
- Pennsylvania
- Pennsylvania Canal (Delaware Division)
  - Category:Pennsylvania
  - commons:Category:Pennsylvania
  - commons:Category:Maps of Pennsylvania
- Pennsylvania Conference for Women
- Pennsylvania Dutch
- Pennsylvania Dutch Candies
- Pennsylvania Dutch Country
- Pennsylvania Fair Trade Coalition
- Pennsylvania firsts
- Pennsylvania Heritage Foundation
- Pennsylvania Leadership Charter School
- Pennsylvania Metropolitan and Micropolitan Statistical Areas
- Pennsylvania Provincial Conference
- Pennsylvania Railroad
- Pennsylvania Renewable Energy and Sustainable Living Festival
- Pennsylvania Route 309
- Pennsylvania Shakespeare Festival
- Pennsylvania State Capitol
- Pennsylvania State Game Lands Number 12
- Pennsylvania State Game Lands Number 115
- Pennsylvania State Police
- Pennsylvania state prisons
- Pennsylvania State University
  - Penn State Lehigh Valley
- Pennsylvania Turnpike
- Penn, William
- People from Pennsylvania
  - Category:People from Pennsylvania
    - commons:Category:People from Pennsylvania
    - Category:People from Pennsylvania by populated place
    - Category:People from Pennsylvania by occupation
- Philadelphia campaign
- Philadelphia, colonial capital 1682–1776, state capital 1776–1799, national capital 1776, 1777, 1778–1783, and 1790–1800
  - Comcast SportsNet (Philadelphia all-sports television network)
  - KYW (Philadelphia CBS television affiliate)
  - Philadelphia City Council
  - Philadelphia City Hall
  - Philadelphia Flyers
  - Philadelphia 76ers
    - Xfinity Mobile Arena
  - Philadelphia International Airport
  - Philadelphia Museum of Art
  - Philadelphia National Constitution Center
  - Philadelphia Eagles
    - Lincoln Financial Field
  - Philadelphia Phillies
    - Citizens Bank Park
  - Philadelphia Soul
  - WCAU (Philadelphia NBC television affiliate)
  - WIP-FM (Philadelphia sports talk radio station)
  - WMGK (Philadelphia classic rock radio station)
  - WMMR (Philadelphia rock radio station)
  - WPVI (Philadelphia ABC television affiliate)
  - WTEL (Philadelphia sports talk radio station)
  - WTXF (Philadelphia Fox television affiliate)
- Philadelphia (film)
- Philadelphia metropolitan area
- The Philadelphia Story
- Pierce, Tillie
- Pinchot, Cornelia Bryce
- Pinchot, Gifford
- Pink
- Pittsburgh
  - Pittsburgh International Airport
  - Pittsburgh Penguins
  - Pittsburgh Pirates
  - Pittsburgh Steelers
- Pocalyko, Michael
- Pocono Mountains
  - Camelback Mountain Resort
  - Camelbeach Waterpark
- Politics of Pennsylvania
  - Category:Politics of Pennsylvania
    - commons:Category:Politics of Pennsylvania
- Portnoy, Mike
- Port of Philadelphia
- Powder Valley
- PPL Corporation
- Promenade Saucon Valley
- Protected areas of Pennsylvania
  - commons:Category:Protected areas of Pennsylvania
- Proud, Robert

== Q ==
- Quakertown
- Queen
- Quinn, Margeurite
- Quinn, Roman

== R ==
- Railroad museums in Pennsylvania
  - commons:Category:Railroad museums in Pennsylvania
- Raphael, Sally Jessy
- Reading
  - Reading Artillerists
  - Reading Phillies
- Reed, Andre
- Reeder, Andrew Horatio
- Religion in Pennsylvania
  - Category:Religion in Pennsylvania
    - commons:Category:Religion in Pennsylvania
- Rey, Zach
- Reznor, Trent
- Riccaboni, Ian
- Riddle, Matt
- Ritter, Donald L.
- Ritter, James
- Roberto Clemente Charter School
- Robinson, Harvey Miguel
- Rocky
- Rock, The
- Rodale, Inc.
  - Men's Health
  - Runner's World magazine
- Roebuck, Daniel
- Roller coasters in Pennsylvania
  - commons:Category:Roller coasters in Pennsylvania
- Rolling Rock

== S ==
- Sachs, Eddie
- Sags, Jerry
- Saint Joseph's University
- Saint Tikhon's Orthodox Theological Seminary
- Salemme, Antonio
- Salisbury High School
- Santorum, Senator Rick
- Saucon Valley Country Club
- Schaffer, Jimmie
- Schenley High School
- Schneck, Dave
- Schneider, Brian
- Scholastic Scrimmage
- School districts in Pennsylvania
- Schuyler, Thom
- Schuylkill County
  - Schuylkill Haven
- Schuylkill River
- Schwab, Charles M.
- Scouting in Pennsylvania
- Scranton family
  - Scranton, George Whitfield
  - Scranton, Joseph A.
  - Scranton, Marion Margery
  - Scranton, William III
  - Scranton, William Walker
  - Scranton, William Warren
  - Scranton, Worthington
- Scranton
  - Scranton Area Community Foundation
  - Scranton/Wilkes-Barre Red Barons
- Second Continental Congress
- Seiple, Larry
- Settlements in Pennsylvania
  - Cities in Pennsylvania
  - Towns in Pennsylvania
  - Townships in Pennsylvania
  - Census Designated Places in Pennsylvania
  - Other unincorporated communities in Pennsylvania
  - List of ghost towns in Pennsylvania
  - List of places in Pennsylvania
- Seyfried, Amanda
- Shadow Gallery
- Shapiro, Beth
- Shelter House
- Shimerville
- Shippensburg University of Pennsylvania
- Shore, Marci
- Sigmund
- Simcox, Grover
- Simmons, Curt
- Singmaster, Elsie
- Sitgreaves, Samuel
- The Sixth Sense
- Ski areas and resorts in Pennsylvania
  - commons:Category:Ski areas and resorts in Pennsylvania
- Slatington
- Smith, Gary Mark
- Smith, Eliza Kennedy
- Smith, Will
- Snelling, Richard A.
- Snelling, Walter O.
- Snyder, Dana
- Solar power in Pennsylvania
- South Central Pennsylvania
- South Mall
- South Mountain
- Spagnola, John
- Specter, Senator Arlen
- Sports in Pennsylvania
  - Category:Sports in Pennsylvania
    - commons:Category:Sports in Pennsylvania
  - Category:Sports venues in Pennsylvania
    - commons:Category:Sports venues in Pennsylvania
- Stabler Arena
- State College
- State highway routes in Pennsylvania
- State of Pennsylvania – see: Commonwealth of Pennsylvania
- State Police of Pennsylvania
- Stewart, Jimmy
- Stewart, Tony
- Stirner, Karl
- St. Luke's University Health Network
- Stone, Sharon
- Storm, Jennifer
- Strohmeyer, Sarah
- Structures in Pennsylvania
  - commons:Category:Buildings and structures in Pennsylvania
- Superfund sites in Pennsylvania
- Susquehanna River
- Symbols of the Commonwealth of Pennsylvania
  - Category:Symbols of Pennsylvania
    - commons:Category:Symbols of Pennsylvania

== T ==
- Tamaqua
- Tantaros, Andrea
- Taylor Allderdice High School
- Taylor, Christine
- Taylor, George
- Telecommunications in Pennsylvania
  - commons:Category:Communications in Pennsylvania
- Temple University
- The 1803 House
- The Express-Times
- The Morning Call
- The Rivalry
- Tokita, Ryo
- Tran, Theo
- Theatres in Pennsylvania
  - commons:Category:Theatres in Pennsylvania
- 30th Street Station
- Thomas, Jonathan Taylor
- Tourism in Pennsylvania website
  - commons:Category:Tourism in Pennsylvania
- Transportation in Pennsylvania
  - Category:Transportation in Pennsylvania
    - commons:Category:Transport in Pennsylvania
- Trexler Nature Preserve

== U ==
- Unisys
- Unitas, Johnny
- United States Constitution
- United States Mint
- United States of America
  - States of the United States of America
  - United States census statistical areas of Pennsylvania
  - Pennsylvania's congressional delegations
  - United States congressional districts in Pennsylvania
  - United States Court of Appeals for the Third Circuit
  - United States District Court for the Eastern District of Pennsylvania
  - United States District Court for the Middle District of Pennsylvania
  - United States District Court for the Western District of Pennsylvania
  - United States representatives from Pennsylvania
  - United States senators from Pennsylvania
- University of Pennsylvania
  - Annenberg School for Communication
  - Graduate School of Education
  - Perelman School of Medicine
  - School of Dental Medicine
  - School of Design
  - School of Engineering and Applied Science
  - School of Nursing
  - School of Social Policy and Practice
  - School of Veterinary Medicine
  - Wharton School
- Upper Darby High School
- Upper Dublin High School
- Upper Macungie Township
- Upper Milford Township
- US-PA – ISO 3166-2:US region code for the Commonwealth of Pennsylvania
- U.S. Route 22 in Pennsylvania

== V ==
- Vallejo, Boris
- Valley Forge
- Valley Forge Military College
- Valley Forge Military Academy
- Valley Preferred Cycling Center
- VanFleet, Melissa
- Van Horne, Dave
- Van Kuren, Cheryl
- Vera Cruz
- Victaulic
- Villanova University
- Voorhees, Donald

== W ==
- WAEB (AM)
- WAEB-FM
- Wales, Orlando Gray
- Walking Purchase
- Water parks in Pennsylvania
- Waterfalls of Pennsylvania
  - commons:Category:Waterfalls of Pennsylvania
- WCTO
- Weaver, Bobby
- Ween
- Weidner, Brant
- Weisberger, Lauren
- Weiss, Bob
- Werley, Cindy
- Wescosville
- West Chester
- West Chester University
- Westgate Mall
- Western Pennsylvania
- WFMZ-TV
- Wheeler, Richard ("Dick")
- Whitehall High School
- Whitehall Mall
- White, Jordan
- White, Josiah
- White, Kevin
- White, Kyzir
  Wikimedia
  - Wikimedia Commons:Category:Pennsylvania
    - commons:Category:Maps of Pennsylvania
  - Wikinews:Category:Pennsylvania
    - Wikinews:Portal:Pennsylvania
  - Wikipedia Category:Pennsylvania
    - Wikipedia Portal:Pennsylvania
    - Wikipedia:WikiProject Pennsylvania
      - Category:WikiProject Pennsylvania articles
      - Wikipedia:WikiProject Pennsylvania#Participants
- Wikoff, Charles A.
- Wild, Susan
- Wilkes-Barre
- William Allen High School
- Williams, Andre
- Williamsport
- Wind Creek Bethlehem
- Wind power in Pennsylvania
- WIP-FM
- WLVT-TV
- WMMR
- WMUH
- Wolf, Joe
- Woodling, Stephanie
- WZZO

== Y ==
- Yeisley, Jason
- Yochum, Dan
- Yocco's Hot Dogs
- York
- The York Water Company

== Z ==
- Zionsville
- Zippel, David
- Zirinsky, Walt
- Zoellner Arts Center
- Zoos in Pennsylvania
  - commons:Category:Zoos in Pennsylvania

== See also ==
- Topic overview:
  - Pennsylvania
  - Outline of Pennsylvania
