= Pennsylvania Historical and Museum Commission =

State agency of Pennsylvania, United States

- Logo of the PHMC

Agency overview
- Formed: June 6, 1945
- Preceding agency: Pennsylvania Historical Commission
- Jurisdiction: State government of Pennsylvania
- Headquarters: State Museum Building, 300 North Street Harrisburg, Pennsylvania, 17120, U.S.; 40°15′57″N 76°53′6.5″W
- Agency executives: Nancy Moses, Chair; Andrea W. Lowery, Executive Director
- Website: www.phmc.state.pa.us

The Pennsylvania Historical and Museum Commission (PHMC) is the governmental agency of the Commonwealth of Pennsylvania, responsible for the collection, conservation, and interpretation of Pennsylvania's heritage. The commission cares for historical manuscripts, public records, and objects of historical interest; museums; archeology; publications; historic sites and properties; historic preservation; geographic names; and the promotion of public interest in Pennsylvania history.

PHMC was established on June 6, 1945, by state Act No. 446, merging the Pennsylvania Historical Commission (PHC), The State Museum of Pennsylvania, and Pennsylvania State Archives.

== Historical marker program ==
The PHMC administers the Historical Marker Program, which, when it began in 1914, installed metal plaques onto large rocks and boulders to commemorate individuals, events, and landmarks throughout the state. The Pennsylvania Historical Commission, the predecessor to the PHMC, launched the program. The markers were redesigned in 1945–46 to make them easier to read from a passing car. Large cast aluminum markers were mounted on poles along a street or road, close to where a landmark was located, a person lived or worked, or an event occurred. By 2020, more than 2,000 markers were in place and were being maintained by the PHMC. The PHMC has posted criteria for inclusion for new markers and accepts marker proposals from the public.

== Pennsylvania Heritage magazine ==
PHMC also publishes Pennsylvania Heritage magazine in conjunction with the Pennsylvania Heritage Foundation.

== PHMC sites ==
- Brandywine Battlefield
- Cornwall Iron Furnace
- Drake Well Museum
- Eckley Miners' Village
- Ephrata Cloister
- Erie Maritime Museum
- Landis Valley Museum
- Old Economy Village
- Pennsbury Manor
- Pennsylvania Anthracite Heritage Museum
- Pennsylvania Lumber Museum
- Pennsylvania Military Museum
- Pennsylvania State Archives
- Railroad Museum of Pennsylvania
- Scranton Iron Furnaces
- State Museum of Pennsylvania

== Partnered properties ==
- Bushy Run Battlefield
- Conrad Weiser Homestead
- Daniel Boone Homestead
- Fort Pitt Museum
- Graeme Park
- Hope Lodge
- Joseph Priestley House
- Somerset Historical Center
- U.S. Brig Niagara

== Placed property program members ==
- Curtin Village at Eagle Ironworks Historical Site
- French Azilum
- The Highlands
- Mather Mill
- Old Chester Court House
- Peace Church

== Pennsylvania Department of Conservation and Natural Resources ==
- Washington Crossing Historic Park

== Organization ==
The commission is organized as an independent administrative board, including nine citizens of the Commonwealth appointed by the Governor, the state's Secretary of Education, two members of the Pennsylvania State Senate appointed by the President Pro Tempore and Minority Leader, and two members of the Pennsylvania State House of Representatives appointed by the Speaker and Minority Leader.

In March 2019, the chair was Nancy Moses, and the executive director was Andrea Lowery. PHMC Commissioners as of March 2019 were: Ophelia M. Chambliss, Andy Dinniman, William V. Lewis, Robert Matzie, Fredrick C. Powell, Pedro Rivera, Robert M. Savakinus, Joseph B. Scarnati III, David Schuyler, Kenneth C. Turner, Parke Wentling, and Philip D. Zimmermann.

== See also ==
- History of Pennsylvania
- List of historical societies in Pennsylvania
- List of Pennsylvania state agencies
- List of Pennsylvania state historical markers
- Western Pennsylvania Conservancy
