= List of Pennsylvania firsts =

This is a list of firsts achieved in Province of Pennsylvania during the colonial era and, following the American Revolution, the U.S. state of Pennsylvania.

== Firsts ==
=== 17th century ===
- 1688 — First public protest of slavery in America, Germantown (now part of Philadelphia)

=== 18th century ===
- 1731 — First subscription library in the United States, Library Company of Philadelphia, founded by Benjamin Franklin
- 1732 — First social club in the English-speaking world, the Schuylkill Fishing Company of the State in Schuylkill, Philadelphia
- 1743 — First institution devoted to science, the American Philosophical Society, Philadelphia
- 1748 — First dancing organization in America, the Dancing Assemblies of Philadelphia
- 1748 — First Lutheran church body in North America, the Pennsylvania Ministerium
- 1751 — First hospital in America, the Pennsylvania Hospital
- 1754 — First (and only) surrender by George Washington, Fort Necessity
- 1762 — First lectures on anatomy in North America, Dr. William Shippen, Philadelphia
- 1765 — First medical school, University of Pennsylvania Medical School, which made Penn the first educational institution to become a university in the United States, Philadelphia
- 1766 — First organized hunting club in America, the Gloucester Fox Hunting Club near Philadelphia
- 1774 — First continuously serving unit in the United States military, the First Troop Philadelphia City Cavalry
- 1775 — Continental Marines founded, Tun Tavern, Philadelphia; now known as U.S. Marine Corps
- 1777 — First United States Capital, Philadelphia. Philadelphia, Pennsylvania was the first capital under the First Continental Congress from September 5, 1774 to October 24, 1774. Philadelphia, Pennsylvania was the first capital under the Articles of Confederation from March 1, 1781 to June 21, 1783
- 1780 — First abolition law, while the state capital was in Philadelphia
- 1784 — First successful daily newspaper, The Pennsylvania Packet and Daily Advertiser, Philadelphia
- 1786 — First vessel ever moved by steam, Delaware River at Philadelphia, by John Fitch
- 1790 — First stock exchange in America, Philadelphia
- 1792 — First United States Mint, Philadelphia
- 1794 — First African Methodist Episcopal church, Mother Bethel A.M.E. Church, Philadelphia
- 1795 — First turnpike in the United States, Philadelphia and Lancaster Turnpike
- 1796 — First suspension bridge, Uniontown by James Finley

=== 19th century ===
- 1805 — First art institution in the United States, the Pennsylvania Academy of the Fine Arts, Philadelphia
- 1805 — First covered bridge in the U.S., the Market Street Bridge (a.k.a. "the Permanent Bridge"), Philadelphia
- 1809 — First theater in the U.S., Walnut Street Theatre, Philadelphia
- 1816 — First wire cable suspension bridge, near Philadelphia, by Josiah White and Erskine Hazard
- 1821 — First pharmacy school, Philadelphia College of Pharmacy (now part of the University of the Sciences in Philadelphia)
- 1845 — First T-rail rolled in the U.S., Danville
- 1848 — First and only visual arts college for women in the United States, Moore College of Art & Design, Philadelphia
- 1856 — First national convention for the Republican Party, Musical Fund Hall, Philadelphia
- 1859 — First grand opera house in the United States still used for its original purpose, the Academy of Music, Philadelphia
- 1859 — First successful oil well, Titusville (Edwin L. Drake)
- 1861 — First pretzel factory, Julius Sturgis, Lititz
- 1863 — First Civil War battle north of the Mason–Dixon line, Hanover, J.E.B. Stuart vs. George Armstrong Custer
- 1866 — First mill in the U.S. dedicated exclusively to the process of making steel, Steelton Plant, near Harrisburg
- 1873 — First Roller Coaster, Jim Thorpe
- 1874 — First zoo, Philadelphia (chartered in 1859)
- 1876 — First World's Fair in the United States, the Centennial Exposition, Philadelphia
- 1877 — First department store opened, Wanamaker's, Philadelphia
- 1879 — First non-reservation school for Native Americans, Carlisle, Carlisle Indian School
- 1881 — First community illuminated by electricity, Philipsburg
- 1881 — First business school in the United States, Wharton School
- 1883 — First successful three-wire electric lighting system, Sunbury
- 1884 — First taxi service, Philadelphia; First Ukrainian Greek Catholic church in the Western Hemisphere, Shenandoah.

=== 20th century ===
- 1901 — First escalator in the U.S., Philadelphia
- 1903 — First World Series, Pittsburgh, Pittsburgh Pirates vs Boston Red Sox
- 1913 — First coast-to-coast highway, Lincoln Highway
- 1919 — First Thanksgiving Day Parade, Philadelphia
- 1920 — First commercial radio station, KDKA (AM) (Pittsburgh)
- 1922 — First municipal airport, Clarion, Parker D. Cramer airfield
- 1922 — First women (eight, including Martha Gibbons Thomas) elected to serve in the Pennsylvania House of Representatives
- 1924 — First woman to serve as Speaker of a State House of Representatives, Alice M. Bentley
- 1932 — First totally air conditioned building, Philadelphia, PSFS Building
- 1933 — First American-born bishop of the Eastern Orthodox Church, September 10, 1933, consecration of Benjamin (Basalyga) of Olyphant
- 1933 — First baseball stadium built for a Black team, Pittsburgh, Greenlee Stadium
- 1933 — First African-American woman to be elected a State Legislator, Crystal Bird Fauset
- 1939 — First Little League Baseball game, June 6, Williamsport.
- 1946 — First large-scale, electronic, digital computer capable of being reprogrammed to solve a full range of computing problems, ENIAC, at The University of Pennsylvania, Philadelphia
- 1947 — First Little League World Series, Williamsport.
- 1948 — First cable television system, Mahanoy City
- 1952 — First indoor zoo - National Aviary, Pittsburgh
- 1957 — First American commercial nuclear generator, Shippingport Atomic Power Station
- 1970 — First African American female Secretary of State, Dr. C. DeLores Tucker, appointed under Gov. Milton Shapp
- 1974 — First successful conjoined twin separation, Philadelphia, Clara and Altagracia Rodriguez, at Children's Hospital of Philadelphia
- 1976 — First automotive bridge to be named for a woman, Betsy Ross Bridge, Philadelphia
- 1976 — First museum for young children, The "Please Touch Museum for Children" in Philadelphia
- 1977 — First African-American to serve as speaker of a state House of Representatives, K. Leroy Irvis of Pittsburgh
- 1999 — First license plate with a web site address

=== 21st century ===
- 2003 — First Secretary of the Department of Homeland Security, January 24, 2003, Tom Ridge
- 2003 — First Puerto Rican Secretary of State in the United States, outside of the Commonwealth of Puerto Rico, April 2, 2003, Pedro A. Cortés
- 2003 — First confirmed Latino Cabinet member, April 2, 2003, Pedro A. Cortés
- 2021 — First openly transgender four-star officer in the nation's eight uniformed services, Rachel Levine.
