= List of cathedrals in Pennsylvania =

This is a list of cathedrals in the state of Pennsylvania, United States:

Municipality	Cathedral	Image	Location & References
Allentown	Cathedral of Saint Catharine of Siena (Roman Catholic)		40°35′56″N 75°29′47″W
Allentown	Cathedral of the Protection of the Most Holy Theotokos (Ukrainian Orthodox)		40°37′14″N 75°27′45″W
Allison Park (Pittsburgh area)	St. Alexander Nevsky Cathedral (Orthodox Church in America)		40°33′39″N 79°59′55″W
Altoona	Cathedral of the Blessed Sacrament (Roman Catholic)		40°30′57″N 78°24′14″W
Bethlehem	Cathedral Church of the Nativity (Episcopal)		40°36′42″N 75°23′01″W
Bryn Athyn (Philadelphia area)	Bryn Athyn Cathedral (General Church of the New Jerusalem)		40°08′09″N 75°04′09″W
Camp Hill (Harrisburg area)	Holy Trinity Cathedral (Greek Orthodox)		40°15′59″N 76°55′03″W
Erie	St. Peter Cathedral (Roman Catholic)		42°07′27″N 80°05′13″W
Erie	Cathedral of St. Paul (Episcopal)		42°07′42″N 80°05′16″W
Greensburg	Blessed Sacrament Cathedral (Roman Catholic)		40°18′23″N 79°32′46″W
Harrisburg	Cathedral of Saint Patrick (Roman Catholic)		40°15′49″N 76°53′11″W
Harrisburg	St. Stephen's Cathedral (Episcopal)		40°15′39″N 76°53′09″W
Huntingdon Valley (Philadelphia area)	St. Mary's Cathedral (Malankara Orthodox Syrian) (Oriental Orthodox communion)		40°07′40″N 75°05′22″W
Johnstown	St. John Gualbert Cathedral (Roman Catholic)		40°19′31″N 78°54′55″W
Johnstown	Christ the Saviour Cathedral (Carpatho-Russian Orthodox)		40°20′59″N 78°56′47″W
Mayfield (Scranton area)	St. John the Baptist Cathedral (Russian Orthodox Church Outside Russia)		41°32′16″N 75°32′07″W
Munhall (Pittsburgh area)	St. John the Baptist Cathedral (Byzantine Catholic)		40°22′56″N 79°54′55″W
Philadelphia	Cathedral Basilica of Saints Peter and Paul (Roman Catholic)		39°57′26″N 75°10′08″W
Philadelphia	Philadelphia Episcopal Cathedral (Episcopal)		39°57′21″N 75°11′53″W
Philadelphia	St. George Cathedral (Greek Orthodox)		39°56′47″N 75°09′17″W
Philadelphia	St. Stephen Cathedral (Orthodox Church in America)		40°05′12″N 75°03′33″W
Philadelphia	Cathedral of the Immaculate Conception (Ukrainian Catholic)		39°57′59″N 75°09′01″W
Philadelphia	St. Vladimir Cathedral (Ukrainian Orthodox Church of the USA)		40°03′15″N 75°07′36″W
Philadelphia	St. Andrew's Cathedral (Russian Orthodox Patriarchate of Moscow)		39°57′49″N 75°08′47″W
Pittsburgh	St. Paul Cathedral (Roman Catholic)		40°26′51″N 79°56′59″W
Pittsburgh	Trinity Cathedral (Episcopal)		40°26′29″N 79°59′55″W
Pittsburgh	St. Nicholas Cathedral (Greek Orthodox)		40°26′41″N 79°57′00″W
Pittsburgh	St. George Cathedral (Antiochian Orthodox)		40°26′04″N 79°57′11″W
Pittsburgh	Holy Trinity Cathedral (Serbian Orthodox)		40°20′51″N 79°58′32″W
Quakertown (Philadelphia area)	Pro-Cathedral Church of the Incarnation (Holy Catholic Church – Anglican Rite) (not in communion with Rome)		40°26′27″N 75°20′42″W
Scranton	St. Peter's Cathedral (Roman Catholic)		41°24′38″N 75°39′50″W
Scranton	St. Stanislaus Cathedral (Polish National Catholic Church) (not in full communion with Rome)		41°23′38″N 75°40′11″W
Wilkes-Barre	Holy Resurrection Cathedral (Orthodox Church in America)		41°15′22″N 75°51′52″W
Wilkes-Barre	St. Stephen's Pro-Cathedral (Episcopal)		41°14′47″N 75°53′04″W

== See also ==
- List of cathedrals in the United States
