= Pennsylvania Heritage Foundation =

- Nickname: PHF
- Predecessor: Friends of the Pennsylvania Historical and Museum Commission
- Formation: 1983; 43 years ago
- Type: Non-profit
- Purpose: Supporting the Pennsylvania Historical and Museum Commission
- Location(s): Commonwealth Keystone Building 400 North Street Harrisburg, Pennsylvania, 17120-0211
- Products: Pennsylvania Heritage magazine
- Fields: History and historic preservation
- Members: 2,000+
- Manager: Mary M. Hull
- Special Projects Coordinator: Jodie Dodson

The Pennsylvania Heritage Foundation (PHF) is a non-profit partner of the Pennsylvania Historical and Museum Commission (PHMC), the official history agency of the Commonwealth of Pennsylvania.

== History ==
=== 20th century ===
Pennsylvania Heritage Foundation was founded in 1983 to support the work of the PHMC in the preservation of Pennsylvania's history. It is governed by a 15-member, volunteer board of directors, and operated on a day-to-day basis by two paid staff members who participate in administrative, community engagement, charitable giving and/or grants management activities..

=== 21st century ===
In November 2018, the PHF was awarded a grant of $19,567 by the U.S. National Archives under its Access to Historical Records: Major Initiatives grant program to "support the work of the Pennsylvania State Historical Records Advisory Board, including the annual Archives and Records Management Seminar, the development of six to eight YouTube videos designed to increase public support for and awareness of historical records programs, creating, and distributing 10,000 bookmarks advocating for the importance of preserving electronic records, and the Archives Without Tears (AWOT) workshops, which will be offered throughout the state."

Prior to this, PHF received National Archives funding in 2013 and 2014 for support of its Archives Without Tears workshops.

The foundation had a roster of more than 2,000 members as of early 2019. Its staff render assistance to PHMC personnel via community engagement, charitable giving and grants management, and member support assistance, and are also active in supporting the History Relevance Campaign, a national initiative launched in 2012 and designed to bring together public history professionals to raise awareness about the ways in which the study and practice of history contributes to a stronger and more engaged citizenry.

In 2019, the Pennsylvania Heritage Foundation continued its collaboration with the State Museum of Pennsylvania on the state's annual art exhibition, "Art of the State." Operating for the 52nd year, the exhibition featured current work by, and awarded cash prizes to, 103 emerging and established artists from 35 Pennsylvania counties working in a variety of media, including painting, paper, photography, and sculpture.

== Mission statement ==
The mission statement as presented on the PHF's website reads as follows:

"The Pennsylvania Heritage Foundation is the non-profit partner of the Pennsylvania Historical and Museum Commission. Governed by a volunteer board, PHF helps preserve the Commonwealth’s rich heritage through charitable funding, membership, grant management, and community engagement."

== Publications ==
The PHF publishes Pennsylvania Heritage magazine four times per year in partnership with the Pennsylvania Historical and Museum Commission (PHMC). According to the organization's website, "The magazine is intended to introduce readers to the Keystone State’s rich culture and historic legacy, to educate them on the value of preserving that legacy, and to entertain and involve them in such a way as to ensure that Pennsylvania’s past has a future." In its 2021 Annual Report, PHMC noted that Pennsylvania Heritage was in its 47th year of publication.

PHF personnel have also penned articles for outside scholarly publications, including Pennsylvania History: A Journal of Mid-Atlantic Studies.
