= Pennsylvania Fair Trade Coalition =

Statewide coalition of labor

The Pennsylvania Fair Trade Coalition (PAFTC) is a statewide coalition of labor, family farm, faith, environmental and student organizations whose mission is to work for socially, economically and environmentally just trade policies which promote a fair global economy and to oppose unjust, unsustainable trade policies.

PAFTC believes that the North American Free Trade Agreement-World Trade Organization model of globalization has failed the US and trading partners when since 2000 Pennsylvania has lost over 200,000 manufacturing jobs.

The PAFTC has advocated on the state level for further evaluation of trade agreements as related to state government procurement. Former director, PAFTC, Phila Back, testified on this matter to the Pennsylvania House of Representatives, recommending a Select Committee on Trade Policy be formed.

Pennsylvania Fair Trade Coalition has also advocated for safer toys, in the context of a toy import safety crisis, citing the root cause of the crisis to be failed trade agreements and weak enforcement.

PAFTC, during the 2008 election received written detailed responses from many of the presidential candidates on what their visions are for trade policy, which were cited in national and international news stories including Bloomberg News.
