= Farley Parkenfarker =

- Birth name: Okie Duke
- Occupation: Keyboardist
- Years active: 1958 - present

Farley Parkenfarker is the stage name of keyboardist Okie Duke. In 1978, he recorded Farley Parkenfarker Plays Elvis, which he performed on a highly modified Hammond B-3 organ.

== Technology ==
The modifications to Parkenfarker's Hammond B3 organ were extensive, integrating features from Hammond's X-77 transistor organ along with a highly customized percussion boost built-in phaser effect and eight audio outputs. Its custom reed system allowed Parkenfarker to play up to 15 different keyboards or synthesizers directly from his modified organ.

This functionality, which pre-dated MIDI by several years, was designed by organ tech Bill Beer of Keyboard Products in Los Angeles and was claimed by Parkenfarker to have been "studied very closely by Japanese engineers from [the] Roland Corporation" in their development of the now ubiquitous MIDI protocol.
