= Pennsylvania Leadership Charter School =

Cyber charter school in Pennsylvania, US

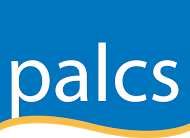

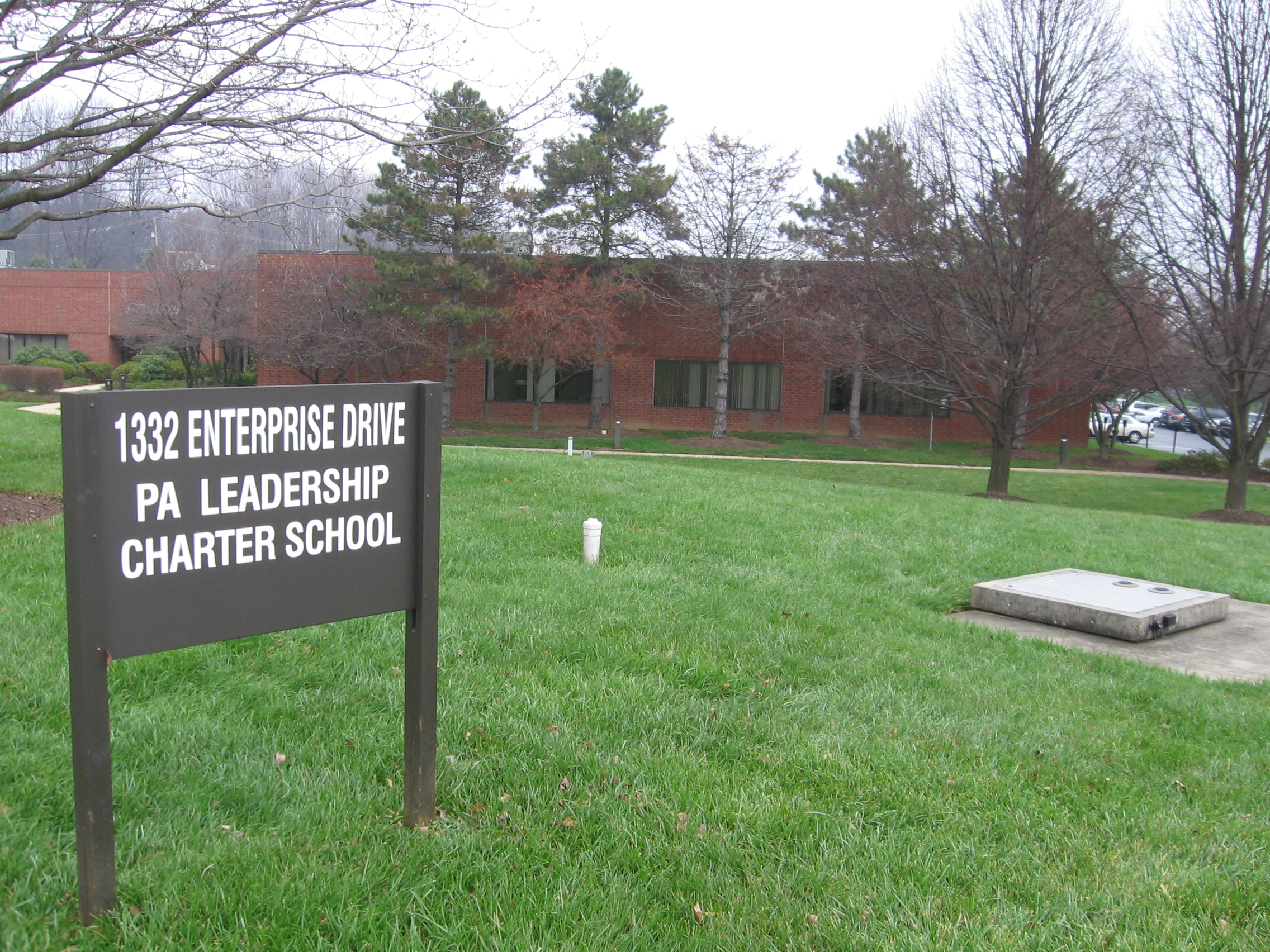
- West Chester office

Location
- 1332 Enterprise Drive; West Chester, Pennsylvania 19380; United States
- 39.9884°N 75.5566°W

Information
- School type: Public, Cyber charter school
- Opened: September 13, 2004
- Founder: James Hanak
- Status: Open
- Staff: 254
- Faculty: 143
- Grades: K–12
- Enrollment: 2927 (October 1, 2018)
- Classes offered: 236
- Colors: Blue and gold
- Mascot: Eagle
- Nickname: PALCS
- Website: www.palcs.org

The Pennsylvania Leadership Charter School (PALCS) is a public cyber charter school approved by the Pennsylvania Department of Education, and open to all students in grades K–12 (ages 5–21) who reside in the state of Pennsylvania.

== Overview ==
As a cyber school, PA Leadership provides educational content over the Internet. As a Pennsylvania public charter school, any student residing in Pennsylvania can choose to enroll in the school. After a registration and orientation process students receive a laptop computer, 3-in-1 printer-scanner-copier, headset-microphone, textbooks, learning kits and online resources.

== School ==
=== Schedule ===
PALCS follows a standard school year of 180 days. They have a similar school calendar to a typical brick and mortar, i.e. winter break, spring break, and in-service days. In order to track attendance, students are required to log in to the school's platform, PALCSchool, every school day. Students are not required to log in at any specific time or for any amount of time unless a live class session is scheduled. Families are recommended to set a schedule and actively engage in school work for roughly five to seven hours a day. The flexible structure gives student the ability to participate in extracurricular activities such as traveling, sports, acting or dancing.

PALCSchool is a custom built learning platform with integrations to various online learning and communication systems. Through PALCSchool, students are connected to Canvas, a learning management system, where assignments are posted with deadlines that are typically one week after the assignment is posted by the teacher. Students have access to their assignments 24/7 and can work from any Internet-connected computer.

=== Elementary school ===
PALCS Elementary School, catering to students in grades K-5, provides students with four core classes and multiple electives. Students are required to attend 2–3 virtual lessons a week, each lesson lasts 30–45 minutes. These lessons are at the same time each week.

=== Middle school ===
PALCS Middle School, catering to students in grades 6–8, provides students with four core classes and multiple electives. Attendance for virtual lessons is worth 10% of the grade but is not required. Students are required to take either Personal Fitness, History of Team Sports, or Health. 8th-grade students are required to take Health regardless of any previous classes.

=== High school ===
PALCS High School, with students in grades 9–12, provides students with at least four core classes of varying rank (Academic, College Prep, Honors, AP), and over 95 electives. PALCS High School students are required to either attend the virtual lessons during the course of a week or watch the recording. PALCS courses are NCAA approved for students looking to continue with athletics in their college career.

=== Standardized testing ===
PALCS Students are required to take PSSAs or Keystone Exams during their school career. PALCS provides testing centers statewide that students attend.

== Additional programs ==
PA Leadership Charter School offers additional programs to currently enrolled students and families. Some of these programs may require an additional application or audition.

=== University Scholars Program ===
The University Scholars Program is an honors program which offers a specialized gifted education curriculum for advanced and motivated learners in grades 6–12. Students interested in this program must show excellence in academics. Students can attend online and on-site in West Chester, PA. Applications and interviews are assessed a year in advance.

=== Center for Performing and Fine Arts ===
The Center for Performing and Fine Arts offers an advanced program to students in grades 6–12 in four disciplines: theater, fine art, music, and dance. Students can attend online or at the Center for Performing and Fine Arts in West Chester, PA. Applications and auditions are assessed a year in advance.

=== School for Professional Studies ===
The School of Professional Studies allows students in grades 9–12 to select a career specialization, complete electives relevant to their specialization and earn a certificate upon graduation. Students can choose from over 15 tracks to help them prepare for college and the workplace. Certificates cover a wide range of topics from arts and humanities to science and technology.

=== Student Opportunity Academic Recovery ===
Student opportunity Academic Recovery, also known as SOAR, is a program for students that have been held back or are a grade behind. SOAR allows students to take two grades in one year (the year being cut in half for each grade). This program is made specifically for 6th to 8th grade. In addition to the year being split in half, content is grouped together. For example, Math/Science and Language Arts/Social Studies.

== Notable alumni ==
- Ralph Lawton, awarded second place in the 2016 Intel International Science and Engineering Fair; the minor planet 33594 Ralphlawton is named after him
- Charlie McDermott, actor
