= The York Water Company =

Public utility in Pennsylvania, US

The York Water Company (Nasdaq: YORW) is an investor-owned, public utility company based in York, Pennsylvania and operating throughout Pennsylvania. The company was founded in 1816 by a group of local businessmen concerned about fire protection.

The company is the oldest investor-owned utility in the nation, and has the longest record of issuing consecutive dividends, which it has paid since 1816.

The company serves an estimated population of 190,000 through approximately 66,000 service connections across 48 municipalities.
