= William F. Andrews (politician) =

American politician

Member of the Florida House of Representatives from the 87 district

Personal details
- Born: January 29, 1946 (age 80) Allentown, Pennsylvania, U.S.
- Party: Republican

William F. Andrews (born January 29, 1946) is an American politician in the state of Florida. He served in the Florida House of Representatives between 1994 and 2000.

== Biography ==
He received his bachelor's degree in design from the architecture school of the University of Florida. He was born in Allentown, Pennsylvania, and currently lives in Delray Beach, Florida, with his family.
