= List of parking authorities in Pennsylvania =

This is a list of parking authorities in Pennsylvania.

Public Authority	City	External link
Allentown Parking Authority	Allentown, Pennsylvania	http://www.allentownparking.com/
Altoona City Parking Authority	Altoona, Pennsylvania	
Bethlehem Parking Authority	Bethlehem, Pennsylvania	
Easton Parking Authority	Easton, Pennsylvania	
Harrisburg Parking Authority	Harrisburg, Pennsylvania	http://www.harrisburgparking.org
Lancaster City Parking Authority	Lancaster, Pennsylvania	
Philadelphia Parking Authority	Philadelphia, Pennsylvania	http://www.philapark.org
Pittsburgh Parking Authority	Pittsburgh, Pennsylvania	https://web.archive.org/web/20071014003837/http://www.city.pittsburgh.pa.us/pghparkingauthority/
Reading Parking Authority	Reading, Pennsylvania	http://www.readingparking.com/
Scranton City Parking Authority	Scranton, Pennsylvania	
Hazleton City Parking Authority	Hazleton, Pennsylvania	
Pittston Parking Authority	Pittston, Pennsylvania	
Pottsville Parking Authority	Pottsville, Pennsylvania	
Greensburg Parking Authority	Greensburg, Pennsylvania	
Apollo Parking Authority	Apollo, Pennsylvania	
Dubois Parking Authority	Dubois, Pennsylvania	
Bridgeville Borough Parking Authority	Bridgeville, Pennsylvania	
Mt. Lebanon Parking Authority	Pittsburgh, Pennsylvania	
Monaca Borough Parking Authority	Monaca, Pennsylvania	
Butler City Parking Authority	Butler, Pennsylvania	
Erie Parking Authority	Erie, Pennsylvania	
Wilkes-Barre City Parking Authority	Wilkes-Barre, Pennsylvania	
Lewistown Parking Authority	Lewistown, Pennsylvania	
Wellsboro Parking Authority	Wellsboro, Pennsylvania	
Mt. Pleasant Borough Parking Authority	Mount Pleasant, Pennsylvania	
Latrobe Borough Parking Authority	Latrobe, Pennsylvania	
Williamsport Parking Authority	Williamsport, Pennsylvania	
St. Marys City Parking Authority	St. Marys, Pennsylvania	
Brownsville Borough Parking Authority	Brownsville, Pennsylvania	
Lansdale Parking Authority	Lansdale, Pennsylvania	
