= Pennsylvania Renewable Energy and Sustainable Living Festival =

Pennsylvania Renewable Energy and Sustainable Living Festival is a three-day festival held every September in Kempton, located in Berks County, Pennsylvania, United States featuring speakers, exhibitors, artists, musicians, films, children's activities, and workshops on topics related to renewable energy, sustainable living, agriculture, forestry, natural building techniques, healthy cooking, and healthy lifestyle.

The festival is hosted by the Mid-Atlantic Renewable Energy Association (MAREA), based in Kutztown, Pennsylvania. MAREA also hosts monthly meetings, workshops, and other events throughout the year.

The first festival was held in September 2005 (20 years ago). Since then, the Pennsylvania Renewable Energy and Sustainable Living Festival, or PA Energy Fest as it's frequently referred to, has attracted tens of thousands of visitors from across the country.
