= Pennsylvania Conference for Women =

- Formation: 2004
- Purpose: Women's Leadership Organization
- Headquarters: Pennsylvania
- Official language: English
- Website: conferencesforwomen.org/pa

The Pennsylvania Conference for Women is a non-profit, non-partisan, one-day professional and personal development event for women that features speakers sharing inspirational stories and leading seminars on the issues such as health, personal finance, executive leadership, small business and entrepreneurship, work/life balance, branding and social media marketing.

The Conference offers opportunities for business networking, professional development, and personal growth. It attracts roughly 7,000 attendees.

== History ==
The first annual Pennsylvania Conference for Women was held in 2004 in Pittsburgh. Former Governor Edward G. Rendell, in conjunction with the Pennsylvania Commission on Women, officially hosted the event. The conference has featured keynote speakers including Madeleine Albright, former U.S. Secretary of State; Sandra Day O’Connor, Justice of the U.S. Supreme Court; Indra Nooyi, Chairman and CEO of PepsiCo; and Doris Kearns Goodwin, presidential historian and best-selling author.

== 2026 Speakers ==
- Bozoma Saint John
- Mindy Kaling
- Kylie Kelce
- Lindsey Vonn

== Past Conference Speakers ==
The conference has hosted speakers including:

- Jill Abramson
- Tomi Adeyemi
- José Andrés
- Jacinda Ardern
- Robin Arzón
- Bertice Berry
- Majora Carter
- Candy Chang
- Jean Chatzky
- Barbara Corcoran
- Kelly Corrigan
- Gail Devers
- Marian Wright Edelman
- Linda Ellerbee
- Cynthia Erivo
- Mia Farrow
- Tina Fey
- Helene Gayle
- Nancy Giles
- Doris Kearns Goodwin
- Farkhonda Hassan
- Glenda Hatchett
- Teresa Heinz
- Jessica Herrin
- Diane Holder
- Mae Jemison
- Tory Johnson
- Marion Jones
- Mindy Kaling
- Diane Keaton
- Evelyn Lauder
- Lisa Ling
- Laura Liswood
- Monica Malpass
- Judith Martin
- Tracey Matsiak
- Denise Morrison
- Betsy Myers
- Indra Nooyi
- Diana Nyad
- Suze Orman
- Sandra Day O’Connor
- Jane Pauley
- Sheryl Lee Ralph
- Julia Reed
- Ann Richards
- Mel Robbins
- Robin Roberts
- Judith Rodin
- Gretchen Rubin
- Zainab Salbi
- Liz Smith
- Dawn Staley
- Martha Stewart
- Naomi Tutu
- Sheryl WuDunn
