= Climate of Pennsylvania =

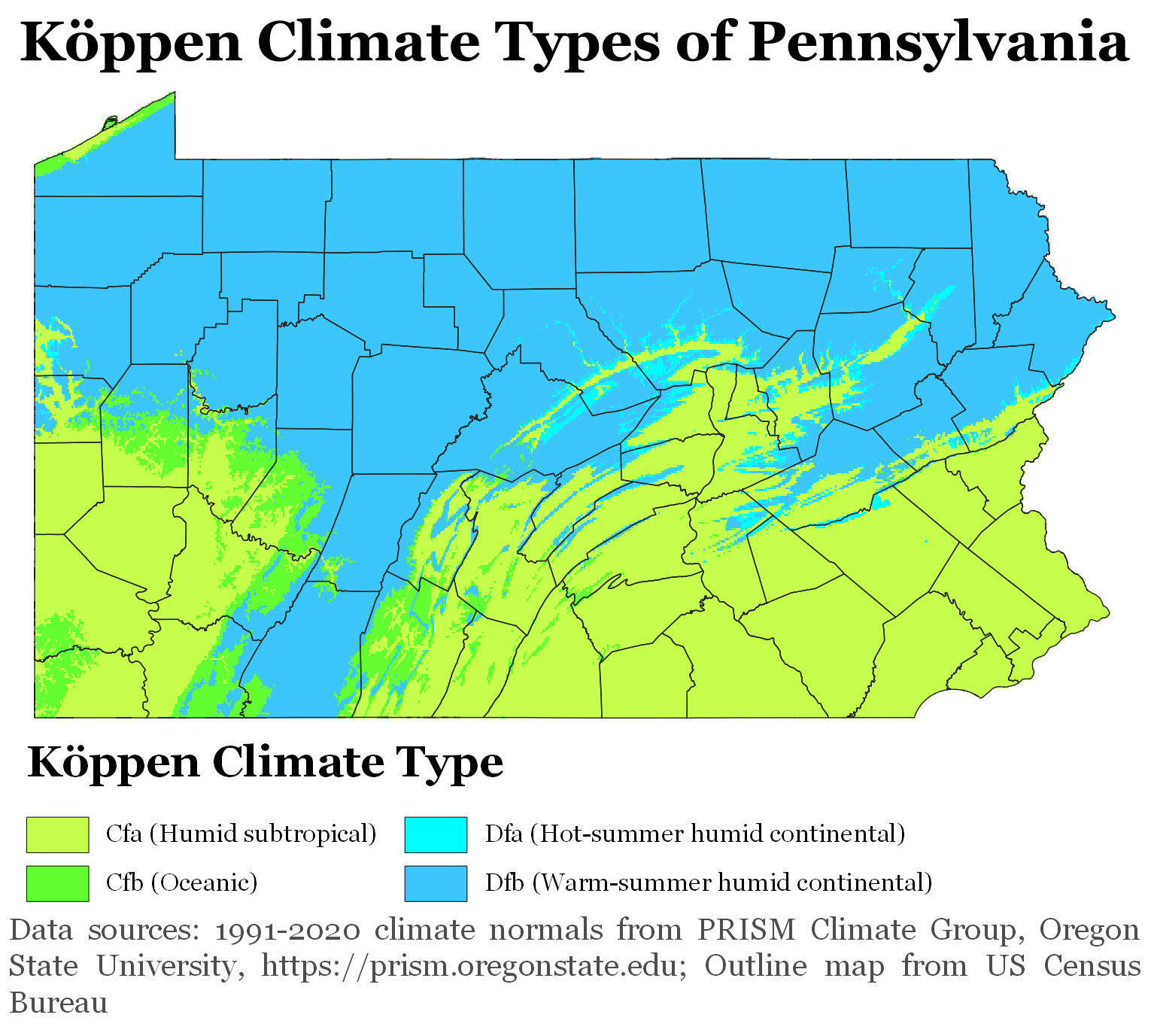
The Köppen climate types of Pennsylvania based on 1991-2020 climate normals

The climate of Pennsylvania is diverse due to the multitude of geographic features found within the state. Straddling two major climate zones, the southeastern corner of Pennsylvania has the warmest climate. A portion of Greater Philadelphia lies at the southernmost tip of the humid continental climate zone, with the city proper being in the humid subtropical climate zone. Still, Philadelphia features colder, snowier winters than most locations with a humid subtropical climate. Moving west toward the mountainous interior of the state, the climate becomes markedly colder, the number of cloudy days increases, and winter snowfall amounts are greater.

Using the January freezing isotherm, the humid subtropical climate (Cfa) only exists in parts of Greater Philadelphia and low-lying areas of the lower Susquehanna Valley from Harrisburg downriver. Pennsylvania's hardiness zone ranges from 5a in high-elevation areas to 7b in parts of Delaware and Philadelphia Counties.

== Precipitation ==
Western areas of the state, particularly cities near Lake Erie, can receive over 100 inches (254 cm) of snowfall annually, and the entire state receives an average of 41 inches (1,041 mm) of rainfall every year. Floods are more common in March and April than other months of the year.

=== Tropical cyclones ===
Tropical cyclones normally threaten the states during the summer and fall, with their main impact being rainfall. Although Hurricane Agnes was barely a hurricane at landfall in Florida, its major impact was over the Mid-Atlantic region, where Agnes combined with a non-tropical low to produce widespread rains of 6 inches (150 mm) to 12 inches (300 mm) with local amounts up to 19 inches (480 mm) in western Schuylkill County in Pennsylvania. These rains produced widespread severe flooding from Virginia northward to New York, with other flooding occurring over the western portions of the Carolinas.

Philadelphia has received sustained winds approaching hurricane-force from tropical cyclones in the past.

== Climate extremes ==
=== Temperature ===
The state record low is −42 °F (−41 °C), recorded at Smethport on January 5, 1904, while the state record high is 111 °F (44 °C), recorded at Phoenixville on July 9 and 10, 1936.

Climate data for Pennsylvania
Month	Jan	Feb	Mar	Apr	May	Jun	Jul	Aug	Sep	Oct	Nov	Dec	Year
Record high °F (°C)	85 (29)	83 (28)	92 (33)	98 (37)	102 (39)	107 (42)	111 (44)	108 (42)	106 (41)	100 (38)	88 (31)	82 (28)	111 (44)
Record low °F (°C)	−42 (−41)	−39 (−39)	−31 (−35)	−5 (−21)	10 (−12)	20 (−7)	28 (−2)	23 (−5)	17 (−8)	7 (−14)	−15 (−26)	−29 (−34)	−42 (−41)
Source: https://climate.met.psu.edu/data/state/staterecords.php

=== Precipitation ===
==== Rain ====
Event	Measurement	Date	Location
Greatest 24-Hour Rainfall	13.50 inches (343 mm)	June 22, 1972 (during Hurricane Agnes)	York

Note: While the official measured rainfall record is given above, the NCDC notes that an estimated 34.50 inches (876 mm) of rain fell in 12 hours near Smethport on July 17, 1942. The NCDC says this is "arguably the greatest 24-hour rainfall on record outside of the tropics".

==== Snow ====
Event	Measurement	Date	Location
Greatest 24-hour snowfall	38.0 inches (97 cm)	March 20, 1958	Morgantown
Greatest two-day snowfall	60.5 inches (154 cm)	December 24–26, 2017	Erie
Greatest snow depth	60.0 inches (152 cm)	March 22 & 23, 1958	Gouldsboro

==== Hurricanes ====
Event	Measurement	Date	Location
Wettest Tropical Cyclone	19.00 inches (483 mm)	Agnes (1972)	Western Schuylkill County

== Climate statistics for selected cities ==
Climate data for Allentown, Pennsylvania at Lehigh Valley International Airport, 1991–2020 normals, (Note: Mean monthly maxima and minima (i.e. the highest and lowest temperature readings during an entire month or year) calculated based on data at said location from 1981 to 2010.) extremes 1922–present (Note: Official records for Allentown were kept at Allentown Gas Company from March 1922 to December 1943, and at Lehigh Valley Int'l since January 1944. For more information, see ThreadEx.)
Month	Jan	Feb	Mar	Apr	May	Jun	Jul	Aug	Sep	Oct	Nov	Dec	Year
Record high °F (°C)	72 (22)	81 (27)	87 (31)	93 (34)	97 (36)	100 (38)	105 (41)	100 (38)	99 (37)	93 (34)	81 (27)	72 (22)	105 (41)
Mean maximum °F (°C)	60.2 (15.7)	60.6 (15.9)	70.6 (21.4)	83.2 (28.4)	89.3 (31.8)	92.6 (33.7)	94.8 (34.9)	92.8 (33.8)	89.2 (31.8)	80.4 (26.9)	70.9 (21.6)	61.7 (16.5)	95.9 (35.5)
Mean daily maximum °F (°C)	38.4 (3.6)	41.6 (5.3)	50.8 (10.4)	63.4 (17.4)	73.5 (23.1)	81.9 (27.7)	86.4 (30.2)	84.3 (29.1)	77.4 (25.2)	65.5 (18.6)	53.8 (12.1)	43.1 (6.2)	63.3 (17.4)
Daily mean °F (°C)	30.1 (−1.1)	32.4 (0.2)	40.7 (4.8)	51.8 (11.0)	62.0 (16.7)	70.9 (21.6)	75.6 (24.2)	73.6 (23.1)	66.3 (19.1)	54.6 (12.6)	43.9 (6.6)	35.0 (1.7)	53.1 (11.7)
Mean daily minimum °F (°C)	21.8 (−5.7)	23.2 (−4.9)	30.5 (−0.8)	40.3 (4.6)	50.6 (10.3)	59.9 (15.5)	64.7 (18.2)	62.8 (17.1)	55.2 (12.9)	43.8 (6.6)	34.1 (1.2)	26.8 (−2.9)	42.8 (6.0)
Mean minimum °F (°C)	4.2 (−15.4)	5.9 (−14.5)	14.1 (−9.9)	25.9 (−3.4)	35.3 (1.8)	46.5 (8.1)	53.7 (12.1)	51.1 (10.6)	39.9 (4.4)	28.7 (−1.8)	19.1 (−7.2)	11.7 (−11.3)	1.8 (−16.8)
Record low °F (°C)	−15 (−26)	−12 (−24)	−5 (−21)	12 (−11)	28 (−2)	39 (4)	46 (8)	41 (5)	30 (−1)	21 (−6)	3 (−16)	−8 (−22)	−15 (−26)
Average precipitation inches (mm)	3.30 (84)	2.77 (70)	3.63 (92)	3.67 (93)	3.65 (93)	4.40 (112)	5.30 (135)	4.56 (116)	4.84 (123)	4.14 (105)	3.24 (82)	3.86 (98)	47.36 (1,203)
Average snowfall inches (cm)	9.8 (25)	10.8 (27)	6.3 (16)	0.5 (1.3)	0.0 (0.0)	0.0 (0.0)	0.0 (0.0)	0.0 (0.0)	0.0 (0.0)	0.2 (0.51)	0.9 (2.3)	4.6 (12)	33.1 (84)
Average extreme snow depth inches (cm)	6.4 (16)	7.9 (20)	4.9 (12)	0.3 (0.76)	0.0 (0.0)	0.0 (0.0)	0.0 (0.0)	0.0 (0.0)	0.0 (0.0)	0.2 (0.51)	0.6 (1.5)	2.9 (7.4)	12.4 (31)
Average precipitation days (≥ 0.01 in)	11.4	10.1	10.9	11.8	12.4	11.4	11.0	10.2	9.6	9.9	8.9	11.5	129.1
Average snowy days (≥ 0.1 in)	5.1	4.3	2.6	0.3	0.0	0.0	0.0	0.0	0.0	0.0	0.5	2.9	15.7
Average relative humidity (%)	70	66	62	61	66	68	70	72	74	72	70	71	69
Percentage possible sunshine	43	48	53	47	54	63	57	56	54	53	45	42	51
Source: NOAA (relative humidity 1981–2010)

Climate data for Erie, Pennsylvania (Erie International Airport), 1991–2020 normals, extremes 1873–present
Month	Jan	Feb	Mar	Apr	May	Jun	Jul	Aug	Sep	Oct	Nov	Dec	Year
Record high °F (°C)	73 (23)	77 (25)	82 (28)	89 (32)	91 (33)	100 (38)	99 (37)	96 (36)	99 (37)	89 (32)	82 (28)	75 (24)	100 (38)
Mean maximum °F (°C)	58.9 (14.9)	58.5 (14.7)	69.1 (20.6)	79.6 (26.4)	85.1 (29.5)	90.2 (32.3)	90.5 (32.5)	89.8 (32.1)	87.1 (30.6)	79.3 (26.3)	68.4 (20.2)	59.7 (15.4)	92.4 (33.6)
Mean daily maximum °F (°C)	35.2 (1.8)	36.5 (2.5)	44.3 (6.8)	56.8 (13.8)	68.3 (20.2)	77.1 (25.1)	81.1 (27.3)	79.9 (26.6)	73.7 (23.2)	62.3 (16.8)	50.5 (10.3)	40.2 (4.6)	58.8 (14.9)
Daily mean °F (°C)	28.2 (−2.1)	28.9 (−1.7)	36.1 (2.3)	47.4 (8.6)	58.8 (14.9)	68.2 (20.1)	72.7 (22.6)	71.5 (21.9)	65.2 (18.4)	54.3 (12.4)	43.6 (6.4)	34.1 (1.2)	50.8 (10.4)
Mean daily minimum °F (°C)	21.3 (−5.9)	21.4 (−5.9)	27.9 (−2.3)	38.0 (3.3)	49.3 (9.6)	59.4 (15.2)	64.2 (17.9)	63.2 (17.3)	56.7 (13.7)	46.3 (7.9)	36.7 (2.6)	28.0 (−2.2)	42.7 (5.9)
Mean minimum °F (°C)	3.6 (−15.8)	4.1 (−15.5)	11.2 (−11.6)	25.7 (−3.5)	35.3 (1.8)	45.7 (7.6)	53.8 (12.1)	53.0 (11.7)	44.4 (6.9)	33.9 (1.1)	23.8 (−4.6)	13.3 (−10.4)	0.2 (−17.7)
Record low °F (°C)	−18 (−28)	−18 (−28)	−9 (−23)	7 (−14)	26 (−3)	32 (0)	44 (7)	37 (3)	33 (1)	23 (−5)	6 (−14)	−11 (−24)	−18 (−28)
Average precipitation inches (mm)	3.41 (87)	2.52 (64)	3.08 (78)	3.47 (88)	3.50 (89)	3.70 (94)	3.33 (85)	3.35 (85)	4.32 (110)	4.38 (111)	3.75 (95)	4.17 (106)	42.98 (1,092)
Average snowfall inches (cm)	31.8 (81)	19.4 (49)	14.5 (37)	2.6 (6.6)	0.0 (0.0)	0.0 (0.0)	0.0 (0.0)	0.0 (0.0)	0.0 (0.0)	0.1 (0.25)	9.6 (24)	26.3 (67)	104.3 (265)
Average extreme snow depth inches (cm)	9.9 (25)	9.1 (23)	7.3 (19)	1.7 (4.3)	0.0 (0.0)	0.0 (0.0)	0.0 (0.0)	0.0 (0.0)	0.0 (0.0)	0.0 (0.0)	4.8 (12)	7.6 (19)	13.8 (35)
Average precipitation days (≥ 0.01 in)	19.7	15.4	14.3	14.0	13.5	11.5	10.5	10.2	10.1	14.3	14.9	18.5	166.9
Average snowy days (≥ 0.1 in)	16.3	12.3	7.8	2.3	0.0	0.0	0.0	0.0	0.0	0.2	4.8	11.5	55.2
Average relative humidity (%)	74.5	75.4	71.9	67.9	68.9	71.3	71.7	74.0	74.5	71.1	72.3	75.0	72.4
Source: NOAA (relative humidity 1961–1990)

Climate data for Harrisburg, Pennsylvania (Harrisburg Int'l), 1991–2020 normals, (Note: Mean monthly maxima and minima (i.e. the highest and lowest temperature readings during an entire month or year) calculated based on data at said location from 1981 to 2010.) extremes 1888–present (Note: Official records for Harrisburg kept at downtown from July 1888 to December 1938, Capital City Airport from January 1939 to September 1991, and at Harrisburg Int'l in Middletown since October 1991.)
Month	Jan	Feb	Mar	Apr	May	Jun	Jul	Aug	Sep	Oct	Nov	Dec	Year
Record high °F (°C)	73 (23)	79 (26)	87 (31)	93 (34)	97 (36)	100 (38)	107 (42)	104 (40)	102 (39)	97 (36)	84 (29)	75 (24)	107 (42)
Mean maximum °F (°C)	59.3 (15.2)	61.4 (16.3)	72.7 (22.6)	83.5 (28.6)	89.5 (31.9)	93.3 (34.1)	96.2 (35.7)	93.8 (34.3)	89.7 (32.1)	81.1 (27.3)	70.8 (21.6)	62.3 (16.8)	97.0 (36.1)
Mean daily maximum °F (°C)	38.6 (3.7)	42.0 (5.6)	51.3 (10.7)	63.8 (17.7)	73.7 (23.2)	82.4 (28.0)	86.8 (30.4)	84.7 (29.3)	77.6 (25.3)	65.7 (18.7)	53.9 (12.2)	43.3 (6.3)	63.6 (17.6)
Daily mean °F (°C)	30.8 (−0.7)	33.4 (0.8)	41.8 (5.4)	53.2 (11.8)	63.4 (17.4)	72.5 (22.5)	77.3 (25.2)	75.2 (24.0)	67.9 (19.9)	55.8 (13.2)	44.8 (7.1)	35.8 (2.1)	54.3 (12.4)
Mean daily minimum °F (°C)	23.0 (−5.0)	24.7 (−4.1)	32.3 (0.2)	42.5 (5.8)	53.1 (11.7)	62.7 (17.1)	67.8 (19.9)	65.8 (18.8)	58.2 (14.6)	46.0 (7.8)	35.8 (2.1)	28.2 (−2.1)	45.0 (7.2)
Mean minimum °F (°C)	7.4 (−13.7)	10.1 (−12.2)	17.9 (−7.8)	29.2 (−1.6)	39.6 (4.2)	50.8 (10.4)	58.3 (14.6)	55.8 (13.2)	45.2 (7.3)	33.0 (0.6)	22.9 (−5.1)	14.6 (−9.7)	5.0 (−15.0)
Record low °F (°C)	−22 (−30)	−13 (−25)	−1 (−18)	11 (−12)	30 (−1)	40 (4)	49 (9)	45 (7)	30 (−1)	23 (−5)	10 (−12)	−8 (−22)	−22 (−30)
Average precipitation inches (mm)	3.03 (77)	2.59 (66)	3.70 (94)	3.55 (90)	3.83 (97)	3.98 (101)	4.74 (120)	3.77 (96)	4.83 (123)	3.81 (97)	2.97 (75)	3.43 (87)	44.23 (1,123)
Average snowfall inches (cm)	9.1 (23)	9.4 (24)	5.6 (14)	0.4 (1.0)	0.0 (0.0)	0.0 (0.0)	0.0 (0.0)	0.0 (0.0)	0.0 (0.0)	0.2 (0.51)	0.8 (2.0)	4.4 (11)	29.9 (76)
Average extreme snow depth inches (cm)	5.3 (13)	5.1 (13)	4.0 (10)	0.2 (0.51)	0.0 (0.0)	0.0 (0.0)	0.0 (0.0)	0.0 (0.0)	0.0 (0.0)	0.1 (0.25)	0.3 (0.76)	2.4 (6.1)	9.8 (25)
Average precipitation days (≥ 0.01 in)	10.9	10.4	11.0	11.4	13.0	11.5	10.9	10.0	9.2	9.2	8.5	10.3	126.3
Average snowy days (≥ 0.1 in)	5.1	4.8	2.7	0.3	0.0	0.0	0.0	0.0	0.0	0.0	0.7	2.7	16.3
Average ultraviolet index	2	3	4	6	8	9	9	8	6	4	2	2	5
Source 1: NOAA
Source 2: Weather Atlas (UV data)

Climate data for Philadelphia (Philadelphia Airport), 1991–2020 normals, (Note: Mean monthly maxima and minima (i.e. the highest and lowest temperature readings during an entire month or year) calculated based on data at said location from 1991 to 2020.) extremes 1872–present (Note: Official temperature and precipitation measurements for Philadelphia were taken at the Weather Bureau Office in downtown from January 1872 to 19 June 1940, and at Philadelphia Int'l from 20 June 1940 to the present. Snowfall and snow depth records date to 1 January 1884 and 1 October 1948, respectively. In 2006, snowfall measurements were moved to National Park, New Jersey directly across the Delaware River from the airport.)
Month	Jan	Feb	Mar	Apr	May	Jun	Jul	Aug	Sep	Oct	Nov	Dec	Year
Record high °F (°C)	74 (23)	79 (26)	87 (31)	95 (35)	98 (37)	102 (39)	104 (40)	106 (41)	102 (39)	96 (36)	84 (29)	73 (23)	106 (41)
Mean maximum °F (°C)	63.3 (17.4)	63.5 (17.5)	73.8 (23.2)	84.3 (29.1)	90.2 (32.3)	94.8 (34.9)	97.1 (36.2)	94.8 (34.9)	90.6 (32.6)	82.6 (28.1)	72.4 (22.4)	64.2 (17.9)	98.1 (36.7)
Mean daily maximum °F (°C)	41.3 (5.2)	44.3 (6.8)	52.8 (11.6)	64.7 (18.2)	74.4 (23.6)	83.2 (28.4)	87.8 (31.0)	85.8 (29.9)	78.9 (26.1)	67.2 (19.6)	55.9 (13.3)	46.0 (7.8)	65.2 (18.4)
Daily mean °F (°C)	33.7 (0.9)	35.9 (2.2)	43.6 (6.4)	54.5 (12.5)	64.3 (17.9)	73.5 (23.1)	78.7 (25.9)	76.8 (24.9)	69.9 (21.1)	58.2 (14.6)	47.4 (8.6)	38.6 (3.7)	56.3 (13.5)
Mean daily minimum °F (°C)	26.0 (−3.3)	27.5 (−2.5)	34.3 (1.3)	44.3 (6.8)	54.2 (12.3)	63.9 (17.7)	69.6 (20.9)	67.9 (19.9)	60.9 (16.1)	49.2 (9.6)	38.8 (3.8)	31.2 (−0.4)	47.3 (8.5)
Mean minimum °F (°C)	10.7 (−11.8)	13.7 (−10.2)	20.8 (−6.2)	33.0 (0.6)	43.1 (6.2)	53.2 (11.8)	62.2 (16.8)	60.3 (15.7)	49.5 (9.7)	37.1 (2.8)	26.4 (−3.1)	19.0 (−7.2)	8.6 (−13.0)
Record low °F (°C)	−7 (−22)	−11 (−24)	5 (−15)	14 (−10)	28 (−2)	44 (7)	51 (11)	44 (7)	35 (2)	25 (−4)	8 (−13)	−5 (−21)	−11 (−24)
Average precipitation inches (mm)	3.13 (80)	2.75 (70)	3.96 (101)	3.47 (88)	3.34 (85)	4.04 (103)	4.38 (111)	4.29 (109)	4.40 (112)	3.47 (88)	2.91 (74)	3.97 (101)	44.11 (1,120)
Average snowfall inches (cm)	7.1 (18)	8.4 (21)	3.6 (9.1)	0.3 (0.76)	0.0 (0.0)	0.0 (0.0)	0.0 (0.0)	0.0 (0.0)	0.0 (0.0)	0.0 (0.0)	0.2 (0.51)	3.5 (8.9)	23.1 (59)
Average precipitation days (≥ 0.01 in)	11.0	9.7	10.9	10.9	11.0	10.3	10.1	8.9	9.3	9.1	8.6	11.0	120.8
Average snowy days (≥ 0.1 in)	4.1	3.8	2.0	0.2	0.0	0.0	0.0	0.0	0.0	0.0	0.1	1.8	12.0
Average relative humidity (%)	66.2	63.6	61.7	60.4	65.4	67.8	69.6	70.4	71.6	70.8	68.4	67.7	67.0
Average dew point °F (°C)	19.8 (−6.8)	21.0 (−6.1)	28.6 (−1.9)	37.0 (2.8)	49.5 (9.7)	59.2 (15.1)	64.6 (18.1)	63.7 (17.6)	57.2 (14.0)	45.7 (7.6)	35.6 (2.0)	25.5 (−3.6)	42.3 (5.7)
Mean monthly sunshine hours	155.7	154.7	202.8	217.0	245.1	271.2	275.6	260.1	219.3	204.5	154.7	137.7	2,498.4
Percentage possible sunshine	52	52	55	55	55	61	61	61	59	59	52	47	56
Average ultraviolet index	2	3	4	6	8	9	9	8	6	4	2	2	5
Source 1: NOAA (relative humidity, dew point and sun 1961–1990)
Source 2: Weather Atlas (UV index)

Climate data for Philadelphia
Month	Jan	Feb	Mar	Apr	May	Jun	Jul	Aug	Sep	Oct	Nov	Dec	Year
Average sea temperature °F (°C)	41.8 (5.5)	39.9 (4.4)	41.2 (5.1)	46.7 (8.2)	53.9 (12.2)	66.3 (19.0)	74.0 (23.3)	75.9 (24.4)	71.4 (21.9)	64.2 (17.9)	55.1 (12.8)	47.7 (8.8)	56.5 (13.6)
Mean daily daylight hours	10.0	11.0	12.0	13.0	14.0	15.0	15.0	14.0	12.0	11.0	10.0	9.0	12.2
Source: Weather Atlas

Climate data for Pittsburgh (Pittsburgh International Airport), 1991–2020 normals, (Note: Mean monthly maxima and minima (i.e. the highest and lowest temperature readings during an entire month or year) calculated based on data at said location from 1991 to 2020.) extremes 1874–present (Note: Records kept September 1874 to June 1935 at the Weather Bureau Office across the Allegheny River from downtown, at Allegheny County Airport from July 1935 to 14 September 1952, and at Pittsburgh Int'l (KPIT) since 15 September 1952. Due to its river valley and urban location as well as elevation, many of the summertime warm minima temperature records set at the WBO have not even come close to being matched at KPIT, which is at-elevation and located in the western suburbs. For more information, see Threadex)
Month	Jan	Feb	Mar	Apr	May	Jun	Jul	Aug	Sep	Oct	Nov	Dec	Year
Record high °F (°C)	75 (24)	78 (26)	84 (29)	90 (32)	95 (35)	98 (37)	103 (39)	103 (39)	102 (39)	91 (33)	82 (28)	74 (23)	103 (39)
Mean maximum °F (°C)	61.5 (16.4)	63.2 (17.3)	73.5 (23.1)	81.5 (27.5)	86.8 (30.4)	90.4 (32.4)	91.3 (32.9)	90.3 (32.4)	88.2 (31.2)	79.9 (26.6)	70.8 (21.6)	62.6 (17.0)	92.6 (33.7)
Mean daily maximum °F (°C)	36.3 (2.4)	39.6 (4.2)	49.1 (9.5)	62.4 (16.9)	71.9 (22.2)	79.4 (26.3)	82.9 (28.3)	81.7 (27.6)	75.1 (23.9)	63.1 (17.3)	50.9 (10.5)	40.6 (4.8)	61.1 (16.2)
Daily mean °F (°C)	28.8 (−1.8)	31.4 (−0.3)	39.7 (4.3)	51.5 (10.8)	61.2 (16.2)	69.4 (20.8)	73.2 (22.9)	71.8 (22.1)	64.9 (18.3)	53.4 (11.9)	42.6 (5.9)	33.7 (0.9)	51.8 (11.0)
Mean daily minimum °F (°C)	21.4 (−5.9)	23.2 (−4.9)	30.3 (−0.9)	40.7 (4.8)	50.6 (10.3)	59.3 (15.2)	63.4 (17.4)	62.0 (16.7)	54.8 (12.7)	43.7 (6.5)	34.3 (1.3)	26.7 (−2.9)	42.5 (5.8)
Mean minimum °F (°C)	1.0 (−17.2)	5.0 (−15.0)	11.7 (−11.3)	25.4 (−3.7)	35.6 (2.0)	45.2 (7.3)	52.5 (11.4)	51.1 (10.6)	41.2 (5.1)	29.5 (−1.4)	19.3 (−7.1)	9.7 (−12.4)	−1.5 (−18.6)
Record low °F (°C)	−22 (−30)	−20 (−29)	−5 (−21)	11 (−12)	26 (−3)	34 (1)	42 (6)	39 (4)	31 (−1)	16 (−9)	−1 (−18)	−12 (−24)	−22 (−30)
Average precipitation inches (mm)	2.96 (75)	2.62 (67)	3.15 (80)	3.32 (84)	3.83 (97)	4.12 (105)	4.26 (108)	3.52 (89)	3.30 (84)	2.83 (72)	2.86 (73)	2.84 (72)	39.61 (1,006)
Average snowfall inches (cm)	13.3 (34)	11.7 (30)	7.6 (19)	1.0 (2.5)	0.0 (0.0)	0.0 (0.0)	0.0 (0.0)	0.0 (0.0)	0.0 (0.0)	0.4 (1.0)	2.4 (6.1)	7.7 (20)	44.1 (112)
Average precipitation days (≥ 0.01 in)	16.8	13.9	14.0	13.9	13.5	12.4	11.2	10.5	9.8	11.1	12.0	14.6	153.7
Average snowy days (≥ 0.1 in)	12.2	9.3	5.9	1.6	0.0	0.0	0.0	0.0	0.0	0.3	3.3	7.6	40.2
Average relative humidity (%)	69.9	67.3	64.1	59.8	63.4	66.2	68.8	71.2	72.0	68.3	70.2	71.9	67.8
Average dew point °F (°C)	17.2 (−8.2)	18.9 (−7.3)	26.8 (−2.9)	34.5 (1.4)	45.9 (7.7)	55.2 (12.9)	60.1 (15.6)	59.5 (15.3)	53.4 (11.9)	40.8 (4.9)	32.4 (0.2)	23.2 (−4.9)	39.0 (3.9)
Mean monthly sunshine hours	93.9	108.5	155.4	182.8	217.4	242.2	254.9	228.4	196.7	167.3	99.4	74.4	2,021.3
Percentage possible sunshine	31	36	42	46	49	54	56	54	53	48	33	26	45
Average ultraviolet index	2	2	2	4	6	6	6	5	4	3	2	1	4
Source 1: NOAA (relative humidity, dew point and sun 1961–1990)
Source 2: Weather Atlas (UV)

Climate data for Wilkes-Barre/Scranton International Airport, Pennsylvania (1991–2020 normals, (Note: Mean monthly maxima and minima (i.e. the expected highest and lowest temperature readings at any point during the year or given month) calculated based on data at said location from 1991 to 2010.) extremes 1901–present (Note: Official records for Avoca/Wilkes-Barre–Scranton kept at downtown Scranton from January 1901 to 17 April 1955 and at Wilkes-Barre/Scranton International Airport since 18 April 1955.))
Month	Jan	Feb	Mar	Apr	May	Jun	Jul	Aug	Sep	Oct	Nov	Dec	Year
Record high °F (°C)	69 (21)	76 (24)	85 (29)	93 (34)	93 (34)	99 (37)	103 (39)	102 (39)	100 (38)	91 (33)	81 (27)	71 (22)	103 (39)
Mean maximum °F (°C)	57.7 (14.3)	57.0 (13.9)	68.0 (20.0)	81.3 (27.4)	88.0 (31.1)	90.5 (32.5)	92.8 (33.8)	90.5 (32.5)	87.6 (30.9)	78.6 (25.9)	69.1 (20.6)	59.6 (15.3)	94.3 (34.6)
Mean daily maximum °F (°C)	35.7 (2.1)	38.8 (3.8)	47.6 (8.7)	61.1 (16.2)	72.2 (22.3)	79.9 (26.6)	84.6 (29.2)	82.4 (28.0)	75.1 (23.9)	63.1 (17.3)	51.2 (10.7)	40.3 (4.6)	61.0 (16.1)
Daily mean °F (°C)	28.0 (−2.2)	30.3 (−0.9)	38.3 (3.5)	50.2 (10.1)	60.9 (16.1)	69.0 (20.6)	73.7 (23.2)	71.8 (22.1)	64.6 (18.1)	53.2 (11.8)	42.7 (5.9)	33.3 (0.7)	51.3 (10.7)
Mean daily minimum °F (°C)	20.3 (−6.5)	21.9 (−5.6)	28.9 (−1.7)	39.3 (4.1)	49.6 (9.8)	58.1 (14.5)	62.7 (17.1)	61.1 (16.2)	54.0 (12.2)	43.3 (6.3)	34.3 (1.3)	26.3 (−3.2)	41.7 (5.4)
Mean minimum °F (°C)	0.6 (−17.4)	3.6 (−15.8)	11.0 (−11.7)	24.7 (−4.1)	34.7 (1.5)	44.1 (6.7)	50.9 (10.5)	48.8 (9.3)	38.7 (3.7)	28.7 (−1.8)	18.0 (−7.8)	9.1 (−12.7)	−1.6 (−18.7)
Record low °F (°C)	−21 (−29)	−19 (−28)	−4 (−20)	8 (−13)	27 (−3)	34 (1)	43 (6)	38 (3)	29 (−2)	19 (−7)	5 (−15)	−13 (−25)	−21 (−29)
Average precipitation inches (mm)	2.59 (66)	2.07 (53)	2.77 (70)	3.26 (83)	3.26 (83)	3.80 (97)	3.61 (92)	3.85 (98)	4.15 (105)	3.71 (94)	2.85 (72)	2.80 (71)	38.72 (983)
Average snowfall inches (cm)	11.7 (30)	10.9 (28)	10.1 (26)	0.8 (2.0)	0.0 (0.0)	0.0 (0.0)	0.0 (0.0)	0.0 (0.0)	0.0 (0.0)	0.7 (1.8)	3.2 (8.1)	7.7 (20)	45.1 (115)
Average precipitation days (≥ 0.01 in)	12.6	11.4	11.8	12.2	12.9	12.9	11.1	11.1	10.0	10.7	10.3	12.1	139.1
Average snowy days (≥ 0.1 in)	8.7	8.4	4.8	1.0	0.0	0.0	0.0	0.0	0.0	0.3	1.7	6.3	31.2
Average relative humidity (%)	70.1	67.5	63.3	60.4	64.6	70.5	71.1	73.8	75.2	71.6	71.8	72.5	69.4
Average dew point °F (°C)	16.2 (−8.8)	17.2 (−8.2)	24.4 (−4.2)	33.1 (0.6)	45.3 (7.4)	55.9 (13.3)	60.4 (15.8)	59.9 (15.5)	53.4 (11.9)	41.4 (5.2)	32.2 (0.1)	22.3 (−5.4)	38.5 (3.6)
Mean monthly sunshine hours	130.3	143.7	185.7	210.5	246.9	269.7	285.7	257.2	200.2	173.3	104.3	95.9	2,303.4
Percentage possible sunshine	44	48	50	53	55	60	62	60	54	50	35	33	52
Source: NOAA (relative humidity and dew point 1964–1990, sun 1961–1990)

== See also ==
- Johnstown Flood
- Wind power in Pennsylvania
