= Pennsylvania statistical areas =

Coordinates: 40.8781°N 77.7996°W

The United States Commonwealth of Pennsylvania currently has 48 statistical areas that have been delineated by the Office of Management and Budget (OMB). On July 21, 2023, the OMB delineated 12 combined statistical areas, 16 metropolitan statistical areas, and 20 micropolitan statistical areas in Pennsylvania. As of 2023, the largest of these is the Philadelphia-Reading-Camden, PA-NJ-DE-MD CSA, comprising the area around the state's largest city of Philadelphia in the southeast region of the state.

== Statistical areas ==
The Office of Management and Budget (OMB) has designated more than 1,000 statistical areas for the United States and Puerto Rico. These statistical areas are important geographic delineations of population clusters used by the OMB, the United States Census Bureau, planning organizations, and federal, state, and local government entities.

The OMB defines a core-based statistical area (commonly referred to as a CBSA) as the county or counties (or county-equivalents) surrounding at least one densely-settled core of at least 10,000 population, "plus adjacent counties having a high degree of social and economic integration with the core as measured through commuting ties with the counties containing the core". The OMB further divides core-based statistical areas based on population into metropolitan statistical areas (MSAs) for those with at least 50,000 and micropolitan statistical areas (μSAs) for those with 10,000 to 49,999 people.

The OMB defines a combined statistical area (CSA) as two or more adjacent core-based statistical areas where the employment interchange rate (% commuting from A to B plus % commuting from B to A) is at least 15%. The primary statistical areas (PSAs) include all combined statistical areas and any core-based statistical area that is not a constituent of a combined statistical area.

The 48 United States statistical areas and 67 counties of the Commonwealth of Pennsylvania (Note: An out-of-state area and its population are displayed in green. An area that extends into more than one state is displayed in purple. A purple population number over a black population number show the total population versus the in-state population. The state's abbreviation is also shown next to the in-state total.)
Combined statistical area	2025 population (est.)	Core-based statistical area	2025 population (est.)	County-equivalent	2025 population (est.)	Metropolitan division	2025 population (est.)
Philadelphia-Camden-Vineland, PA-NJ-DE-MD CSA	7,493,171; 4,677,877 (PA)	Philadelphia-Camden-Wilmington, PA-NJ-DE-MD MSA	6,329,118; 4,237,805 (PA)	Philadelphia County, Pennsylvania	1,574,281	Philadelphia, PA MD	2,155,218
Philadelphia-Camden-Vineland, PA-NJ-DE-MD CSA	7,493,171; 4,677,877 (PA)	Philadelphia-Camden-Wilmington, PA-NJ-DE-MD MSA	6,329,118; 4,237,805 (PA)	Delaware County, Pennsylvania	580,937	Philadelphia, PA MD	2,155,218
Philadelphia-Camden-Vineland, PA-NJ-DE-MD CSA	7,493,171; 4,677,877 (PA)	Philadelphia-Camden-Wilmington, PA-NJ-DE-MD MSA	6,329,118; 4,237,805 (PA)	Montgomery County, Pennsylvania	877,643	Montgomery County-Chester County-Bucks County, PA MD	2,082,587
Philadelphia-Camden-Vineland, PA-NJ-DE-MD CSA	7,493,171; 4,677,877 (PA)	Philadelphia-Camden-Wilmington, PA-NJ-DE-MD MSA	6,329,118; 4,237,805 (PA)	Bucks County, Pennsylvania	647,828	Montgomery County-Chester County-Bucks County, PA MD	2,082,587
Philadelphia-Camden-Vineland, PA-NJ-DE-MD CSA	7,493,171; 4,677,877 (PA)	Philadelphia-Camden-Wilmington, PA-NJ-DE-MD MSA	6,329,118; 4,237,805 (PA)	Chester County, Pennsylvania	557,116	Montgomery County-Chester County-Bucks County, PA MD	2,082,587
Philadelphia-Camden-Vineland, PA-NJ-DE-MD CSA	7,493,171; 4,677,877 (PA)	Philadelphia-Camden-Wilmington, PA-NJ-DE-MD MSA	6,329,118; 4,237,805 (PA)	Camden County, New Jersey	535,799	Camden, NJ MD	1,329,876
Philadelphia-Camden-Vineland, PA-NJ-DE-MD CSA	7,493,171; 4,677,877 (PA)	Philadelphia-Camden-Wilmington, PA-NJ-DE-MD MSA	6,329,118; 4,237,805 (PA)	Burlington County, New Jersey	481,439	Camden, NJ MD	1,329,876
Philadelphia-Camden-Vineland, PA-NJ-DE-MD CSA	7,493,171; 4,677,877 (PA)	Philadelphia-Camden-Wilmington, PA-NJ-DE-MD MSA	6,329,118; 4,237,805 (PA)	Gloucester County, New Jersey	312,638	Camden, NJ MD	1,329,876
Philadelphia-Camden-Vineland, PA-NJ-DE-MD CSA	7,493,171; 4,677,877 (PA)	Philadelphia-Camden-Wilmington, PA-NJ-DE-MD MSA	6,329,118; 4,237,805 (PA)	New Castle County, Delaware	588,026	Wilmington, DE-MD-NJ MD	761,437
Philadelphia-Camden-Vineland, PA-NJ-DE-MD CSA	7,493,171; 4,677,877 (PA)	Philadelphia-Camden-Wilmington, PA-NJ-DE-MD MSA	6,329,118; 4,237,805 (PA)	Cecil County, Maryland	107,131	Wilmington, DE-MD-NJ MD	761,437
Philadelphia-Camden-Vineland, PA-NJ-DE-MD CSA	7,493,171; 4,677,877 (PA)	Philadelphia-Camden-Wilmington, PA-NJ-DE-MD MSA	6,329,118; 4,237,805 (PA)	Salem County, New Jersey	66,280	Wilmington, DE-MD-NJ MD	761,437
Philadelphia-Camden-Vineland, PA-NJ-DE-MD CSA	7,493,171; 4,677,877 (PA)	Reading, PA MSA	440,072	Berks County, Pennsylvania	440,072	none	
Philadelphia-Camden-Vineland, PA-NJ-DE-MD CSA	7,493,171; 4,677,877 (PA)	Atlantic City-Hammonton, NJ MSA	372,047	Atlantic County, New Jersey	278,657	none	
Philadelphia-Camden-Vineland, PA-NJ-DE-MD CSA	7,493,171; 4,677,877 (PA)	Atlantic City-Hammonton, NJ MSA	372,047	Cape May County, New Jersey	93,390	none	
Philadelphia-Camden-Vineland, PA-NJ-DE-MD CSA	7,493,171; 4,677,877 (PA)	Dover, DE MSA	194,786	Kent County, Delaware	194,786	none	
Philadelphia-Camden-Vineland, PA-NJ-DE-MD CSA	7,493,171; 4,677,877 (PA)	Vineland, NJ MSA	157,148	Cumberland County, New Jersey	157,148	none	
Pittsburgh-Weirton-Steubenville, PA-OH-WV CSA	2,725,198; 2,612,730 (PA)	Pittsburgh, PA MSA	2,421,992	Allegheny County, Pennsylvania	1,225,035	none	
Pittsburgh-Weirton-Steubenville, PA-OH-WV CSA	2,725,198; 2,612,730 (PA)	Pittsburgh, PA MSA	2,421,992	Westmoreland County, Pennsylvania	349,324	none	
Pittsburgh-Weirton-Steubenville, PA-OH-WV CSA	2,725,198; 2,612,730 (PA)	Pittsburgh, PA MSA	2,421,992	Washington County, Pennsylvania	210,802	none	
Pittsburgh-Weirton-Steubenville, PA-OH-WV CSA	2,725,198; 2,612,730 (PA)	Pittsburgh, PA MSA	2,421,992	Butler County, Pennsylvania	200,169	none	
Pittsburgh-Weirton-Steubenville, PA-OH-WV CSA	2,725,198; 2,612,730 (PA)	Pittsburgh, PA MSA	2,421,992	Beaver County, Pennsylvania	166,032	none	
Pittsburgh-Weirton-Steubenville, PA-OH-WV CSA	2,725,198; 2,612,730 (PA)	Pittsburgh, PA MSA	2,421,992	Fayette County, Pennsylvania	123,021	none	
Pittsburgh-Weirton-Steubenville, PA-OH-WV CSA	2,725,198; 2,612,730 (PA)	Pittsburgh, PA MSA	2,421,992	Lawrence County, Pennsylvania	83,911	none	
Pittsburgh-Weirton-Steubenville, PA-OH-WV CSA	2,725,198; 2,612,730 (PA)	Pittsburgh, PA MSA	2,421,992	Armstrong County, Pennsylvania	63,698	none	
Pittsburgh-Weirton-Steubenville, PA-OH-WV CSA	2,725,198; 2,612,730 (PA)	Weirton-Steubenville, WV-OH MSA	112,468	Jefferson County, Ohio	63,597	none	
Pittsburgh-Weirton-Steubenville, PA-OH-WV CSA	2,725,198; 2,612,730 (PA)	Weirton-Steubenville, WV-OH MSA	112,468	Hancock County, West Virginia	27,729	none	
Pittsburgh-Weirton-Steubenville, PA-OH-WV CSA	2,725,198; 2,612,730 (PA)	Weirton-Steubenville, WV-OH MSA	112,468	Brooke County, West Virginia	21,142	none	
Pittsburgh-Weirton-Steubenville, PA-OH-WV CSA	2,725,198; 2,612,730 (PA)	Hermitage, PA μSA	107,860	Mercer County, Pennsylvania	107,860	none	
Pittsburgh-Weirton-Steubenville, PA-OH-WV CSA	2,725,198; 2,612,730 (PA)	Indiana, PA μSA	82,878	Indiana County, Pennsylvania	82,878	none	
Harrisburg–York–Lebanon, PA CSA	1,344,598	Harrisburg-Carlisle, PA MSA	617,427	Dauphin County, Pennsylvania	293,351	none	
Harrisburg–York–Lebanon, PA CSA	1,344,598	Harrisburg-Carlisle, PA MSA	617,427	Cumberland County, Pennsylvania	277,270	none	
Harrisburg–York–Lebanon, PA CSA	1,344,598	Harrisburg-Carlisle, PA MSA	617,427	Perry County, Pennsylvania	46,806	none	
Harrisburg–York–Lebanon, PA CSA	1,344,598	York-Hanover, PA MSA	473,197	York County, Pennsylvania	473,197	none	
Harrisburg–York–Lebanon, PA CSA	1,344,598	Lebanon, PA MSA	146,380	Lebanon County, Pennsylvania	146,380	none	
Harrisburg–York–Lebanon, PA CSA	1,344,598	Gettysburg, PA MSA	107,594	Adams County, Pennsylvania	107,594	none	
Allentown-Bethlehem-East Stroudsburg, PA-NJ CSA	1,054,794; 941,841 (PA)	Allentown-Bethlehem-Easton, PA-NJ MSA	887,615; 774,662 (PA)	Lehigh County, Pennsylvania	384,383	none	
Allentown-Bethlehem-East Stroudsburg, PA-NJ CSA	1,054,794; 941,841 (PA)	Allentown-Bethlehem-Easton, PA-NJ MSA	887,615; 774,662 (PA)	Northampton County, Pennsylvania	324,411	none	
Allentown-Bethlehem-East Stroudsburg, PA-NJ CSA	1,054,794; 941,841 (PA)	Allentown-Bethlehem-Easton, PA-NJ MSA	887,615; 774,662 (PA)	Warren County, New Jersey	112,953	none	
Allentown-Bethlehem-East Stroudsburg, PA-NJ CSA	1,054,794; 941,841 (PA)	Allentown-Bethlehem-Easton, PA-NJ MSA	887,615; 774,662 (PA)	Carbon County, Pennsylvania	65,868	none	
Allentown-Bethlehem-East Stroudsburg, PA-NJ CSA	1,054,794; 941,841 (PA)	East Stroudsburg, PA μSA	167,179	Monroe County, Pennsylvania	167,179	none	
none		Scranton--Wilkes-Barre, PA MSA	574,418	Luzerne County, Pennsylvania	332,126	none	
none		Scranton--Wilkes-Barre, PA MSA	574,418	Lackawanna County, Pennsylvania	216,502	none	
none		Scranton--Wilkes-Barre, PA MSA	574,418	Wyoming County, Pennsylvania	25,790	none	
none		Lancaster, PA MSA	563,159	Lancaster County, Pennsylvania	563,159	none	
Erie-Meadville, PA CSA	347,624	Erie, PA MSA	265,832	Erie County, Pennsylvania	265,832	none	
Erie-Meadville, PA CSA	347,624	Meadville, PA μSA	81,792	Crawford County, Pennsylvania	81,792	none	
Bloomsburg-Berwick-Sunbury, PA CSA	255,949	Sunbury, PA μSA	107,788	Northumberland County, Pennsylvania	89,920	none	
Bloomsburg-Berwick-Sunbury, PA CSA	255,949	Sunbury, PA μSA	107,788	Montour County, Pennsylvania	17,868	none	
Bloomsburg-Berwick-Sunbury, PA CSA	255,949	Bloomsburg-Berwick, PA μSA	66,193	Columbia County, Pennsylvania	66,193	none	
Bloomsburg-Berwick-Sunbury, PA CSA	255,949	Lewisburg, PA μSA	42,313	Union County, Pennsylvania	42,313	none	
Bloomsburg-Berwick-Sunbury, PA CSA	255,949	Selinsgrove, PA μSA	39,655	Snyder County, Pennsylvania	39,655	none	
State College-DuBois, PA CSA	235,493	State College, PA MSA	157,393	Centre County, Pennsylvania	157,393	none	
State College-DuBois, PA CSA	235,493	DuBois, PA μSA	78,100	Clearfield County, Pennsylvania	78,100	none	
Johnstown-Somerset, PA CSA	200,972	Johnstown, PA MSA	128,968	Cambria County, Pennsylvania	128,968	none	
Johnstown-Somerset, PA CSA	200,972	Somerset, PA μSA	72,004	Somerset County, Pennsylvania	72,004	none	
Altoona-Huntingdon, PA CSA	162,542	Altoona, PA MSA	119,541	Blair County, Pennsylvania	119,541	none	
Altoona-Huntingdon, PA CSA	162,542	Huntingdon, PA μSA	43,001	Huntingdon County, Pennsylvania	43,001	none	
Washington-Baltimore-Arlington, DC-MD-VA-WV-PA CSA	10,274,894; 160,652 (PA)	Washington-Arlington-Alexandria, DC-VA-MD-WV MSA	6,465,724	Fairfax County, Virginia	1,167,873	Arlington-Alexandria-Reston, VA-WV MD	3,247,647
Washington-Baltimore-Arlington, DC-MD-VA-WV-PA CSA	10,274,894; 160,652 (PA)	Washington-Arlington-Alexandria, DC-VA-MD-WV MSA	6,465,724	Prince William County, Virginia	502,966	Arlington-Alexandria-Reston, VA-WV MD	3,247,647
Washington-Baltimore-Arlington, DC-MD-VA-WV-PA CSA	10,274,894; 160,652 (PA)	Washington-Arlington-Alexandria, DC-VA-MD-WV MSA	6,465,724	Loudoun County, Virginia	449,749	Arlington-Alexandria-Reston, VA-WV MD	3,247,647
Washington-Baltimore-Arlington, DC-MD-VA-WV-PA CSA	10,274,894; 160,652 (PA)	Washington-Arlington-Alexandria, DC-VA-MD-WV MSA	6,465,724	Arlington County, Virginia	243,931	Arlington-Alexandria-Reston, VA-WV MD	3,247,647
Washington-Baltimore-Arlington, DC-MD-VA-WV-PA CSA	10,274,894; 160,652 (PA)	Washington-Arlington-Alexandria, DC-VA-MD-WV MSA	6,465,724	Stafford County, Virginia	170,803	Arlington-Alexandria-Reston, VA-WV MD	3,247,647
Washington-Baltimore-Arlington, DC-MD-VA-WV-PA CSA	10,274,894; 160,652 (PA)	Washington-Arlington-Alexandria, DC-VA-MD-WV MSA	6,465,724	City of Alexandria, Virginia	160,662	Arlington-Alexandria-Reston, VA-WV MD	3,247,647
Washington-Baltimore-Arlington, DC-MD-VA-WV-PA CSA	10,274,894; 160,652 (PA)	Washington-Arlington-Alexandria, DC-VA-MD-WV MSA	6,465,724	Spotsylvania County, Virginia	155,388	Arlington-Alexandria-Reston, VA-WV MD	3,247,647
Washington-Baltimore-Arlington, DC-MD-VA-WV-PA CSA	10,274,894; 160,652 (PA)	Washington-Arlington-Alexandria, DC-VA-MD-WV MSA	6,465,724	Fauquier County, Virginia	76,503	Arlington-Alexandria-Reston, VA-WV MD	3,247,647
Washington-Baltimore-Arlington, DC-MD-VA-WV-PA CSA	10,274,894; 160,652 (PA)	Washington-Arlington-Alexandria, DC-VA-MD-WV MSA	6,465,724	Jefferson County, West Virginia	63,102	Arlington-Alexandria-Reston, VA-WV MD	3,247,647
Washington-Baltimore-Arlington, DC-MD-VA-WV-PA CSA	10,274,894; 160,652 (PA)	Washington-Arlington-Alexandria, DC-VA-MD-WV MSA	6,465,724	Culpeper County, Virginia	57,666	Arlington-Alexandria-Reston, VA-WV MD	3,247,647
Washington-Baltimore-Arlington, DC-MD-VA-WV-PA CSA	10,274,894; 160,652 (PA)	Washington-Arlington-Alexandria, DC-VA-MD-WV MSA	6,465,724	City of Manassas, Virginia	44,332	Arlington-Alexandria-Reston, VA-WV MD	3,247,647
Washington-Baltimore-Arlington, DC-MD-VA-WV-PA CSA	10,274,894; 160,652 (PA)	Washington-Arlington-Alexandria, DC-VA-MD-WV MSA	6,465,724	Warren County, Virginia	42,740	Arlington-Alexandria-Reston, VA-WV MD	3,247,647
Washington-Baltimore-Arlington, DC-MD-VA-WV-PA CSA	10,274,894; 160,652 (PA)	Washington-Arlington-Alexandria, DC-VA-MD-WV MSA	6,465,724	City of Fredericksburg, Virginia	30,393	Arlington-Alexandria-Reston, VA-WV MD	3,247,647
Washington-Baltimore-Arlington, DC-MD-VA-WV-PA CSA	10,274,894; 160,652 (PA)	Washington-Arlington-Alexandria, DC-VA-MD-WV MSA	6,465,724	City of Fairfax, Virginia	26,772	Arlington-Alexandria-Reston, VA-WV MD	3,247,647
Washington-Baltimore-Arlington, DC-MD-VA-WV-PA CSA	10,274,894; 160,652 (PA)	Washington-Arlington-Alexandria, DC-VA-MD-WV MSA	6,465,724	City of Manassas Park, Virginia	16,560	Arlington-Alexandria-Reston, VA-WV MD	3,247,647
Washington-Baltimore-Arlington, DC-MD-VA-WV-PA CSA	10,274,894; 160,652 (PA)	Washington-Arlington-Alexandria, DC-VA-MD-WV MSA	6,465,724	Clarke County, Virginia	15,609	Arlington-Alexandria-Reston, VA-WV MD	3,247,647
Washington-Baltimore-Arlington, DC-MD-VA-WV-PA CSA	10,274,894; 160,652 (PA)	Washington-Arlington-Alexandria, DC-VA-MD-WV MSA	6,465,724	City of Falls Church, Virginia	15,159	Arlington-Alexandria-Reston, VA-WV MD	3,247,647
Washington-Baltimore-Arlington, DC-MD-VA-WV-PA CSA	10,274,894; 160,652 (PA)	Washington-Arlington-Alexandria, DC-VA-MD-WV MSA	6,465,724	Rappahannock County, Virginia	7,439	Arlington-Alexandria-Reston, VA-WV MD	3,247,647
Washington-Baltimore-Arlington, DC-MD-VA-WV-PA CSA	10,274,894; 160,652 (PA)	Washington-Arlington-Alexandria, DC-VA-MD-WV MSA	6,465,724	Prince George's County, Maryland	970,374	Washington, DC-MD MD	1,840,612
Washington-Baltimore-Arlington, DC-MD-VA-WV-PA CSA	10,274,894; 160,652 (PA)	Washington-Arlington-Alexandria, DC-VA-MD-WV MSA	6,465,724	District of Columbia	693,645	Washington, DC-MD MD	1,840,612
Washington-Baltimore-Arlington, DC-MD-VA-WV-PA CSA	10,274,894; 160,652 (PA)	Washington-Arlington-Alexandria, DC-VA-MD-WV MSA	6,465,724	Charles County, Maryland	176,593	Washington, DC-MD MD	1,840,612
Washington-Baltimore-Arlington, DC-MD-VA-WV-PA CSA	10,274,894; 160,652 (PA)	Washington-Arlington-Alexandria, DC-VA-MD-WV MSA	6,465,724	Montgomery County, Maryland	1,074,582	Frederick-Gaithersburg-Bethesda, MD MD	1,377,465
Washington-Baltimore-Arlington, DC-MD-VA-WV-PA CSA	10,274,894; 160,652 (PA)	Washington-Arlington-Alexandria, DC-VA-MD-WV MSA	6,465,724	Frederick County, Maryland	302,883	Frederick-Gaithersburg-Bethesda, MD MD	1,377,465
Washington-Baltimore-Arlington, DC-MD-VA-WV-PA CSA	10,274,894; 160,652 (PA)	Baltimore-Columbia-Towson, MD MSA	2,857,781	Baltimore County, Maryland	847,650	none	
Washington-Baltimore-Arlington, DC-MD-VA-WV-PA CSA	10,274,894; 160,652 (PA)	Baltimore-Columbia-Towson, MD MSA	2,857,781	Anne Arundel County, Maryland	603,380	none	
Washington-Baltimore-Arlington, DC-MD-VA-WV-PA CSA	10,274,894; 160,652 (PA)	Baltimore-Columbia-Towson, MD MSA	2,857,781	Baltimore City, Maryland	569,997	none	
Washington-Baltimore-Arlington, DC-MD-VA-WV-PA CSA	10,274,894; 160,652 (PA)	Baltimore-Columbia-Towson, MD MSA	2,857,781	Howard County, Maryland	339,183	none	
Washington-Baltimore-Arlington, DC-MD-VA-WV-PA CSA	10,274,894; 160,652 (PA)	Baltimore-Columbia-Towson, MD MSA	2,857,781	Harford County, Maryland	266,446	none	
Washington-Baltimore-Arlington, DC-MD-VA-WV-PA CSA	10,274,894; 160,652 (PA)	Baltimore-Columbia-Towson, MD MSA	2,857,781	Carroll County, Maryland	176,677	none	
Washington-Baltimore-Arlington, DC-MD-VA-WV-PA CSA	10,274,894; 160,652 (PA)	Baltimore-Columbia-Towson, MD MSA	2,857,781	Queen Anne's County, Maryland	54,448	none	
Washington-Baltimore-Arlington, DC-MD-VA-WV-PA CSA	10,274,894; 160,652 (PA)	Hagerstown-Martinsburg, MD-WV MSA	315,280	Washington County, Maryland	157,731	none	
Washington-Baltimore-Arlington, DC-MD-VA-WV-PA CSA	10,274,894; 160,652 (PA)	Hagerstown-Martinsburg, MD-WV MSA	315,280	Berkeley County, West Virginia	139,522	none	
Washington-Baltimore-Arlington, DC-MD-VA-WV-PA CSA	10,274,894; 160,652 (PA)	Hagerstown-Martinsburg, MD-WV MSA	315,280	Morgan County, West Virginia	18,027	none	
Washington-Baltimore-Arlington, DC-MD-VA-WV-PA CSA	10,274,894; 160,652 (PA)	Lexington Park, MD μSA	211,176	St. Mary's County, Maryland	116,692	none	
Washington-Baltimore-Arlington, DC-MD-VA-WV-PA CSA	10,274,894; 160,652 (PA)	Lexington Park, MD μSA	211,176	Calvert County, Maryland	94,484	none	
Washington-Baltimore-Arlington, DC-MD-VA-WV-PA CSA	10,274,894; 160,652 (PA)	Chambersburg, PA MSA	160,652	Franklin County, Pennsylvania	160,652	none	
Washington-Baltimore-Arlington, DC-MD-VA-WV-PA CSA	10,274,894; 160,652 (PA)	Winchester, VA-WV MSA	152,332	Frederick County, Virginia	99,955	none	
Washington-Baltimore-Arlington, DC-MD-VA-WV-PA CSA	10,274,894; 160,652 (PA)	Winchester, VA-WV MSA	152,332	City of Winchester, Virginia	28,272	none	
Washington-Baltimore-Arlington, DC-MD-VA-WV-PA CSA	10,274,894; 160,652 (PA)	Winchester, VA-WV MSA	152,332	Hampshire County, West Virginia	24,105	none	
Washington-Baltimore-Arlington, DC-MD-VA-WV-PA CSA	10,274,894; 160,652 (PA)	Lake of the Woods, VA μSA	40,083	Orange County, Virginia	40,083	none	
Washington-Baltimore-Arlington, DC-MD-VA-WV-PA CSA	10,274,894; 160,652 (PA)	Easton, MD μSA	38,238	Talbot County, Maryland	38,238	none	
Washington-Baltimore-Arlington, DC-MD-VA-WV-PA CSA	10,274,894; 160,652 (PA)	Cambridge, MD μSA	33,628	Dorchester County, Maryland	33,628	none	
Williamsport-Lock Haven, PA CSA	150,457	Williamsport, PA MSA	112,587	Lycoming County, Pennsylvania	112,724	none	
Williamsport-Lock Haven, PA CSA	150,457	Lock Haven, PA μSA	37,870	Clinton County, Pennsylvania	37,870	none	
none		Pottsville, PA μSA	145,085	Schuylkill County, Pennsylvania	145,085	none	
New York-Newark, NY-NJ-CT-PA CSA	22,535,017; 62,808 (PA)	New York-Newark-Jersey City, NY-NJ MSA	20,112,448	Kings County, New York	2,653,963	New York-Jersey City-White Plains, NY-NJ MD	12,300,480
New York-Newark, NY-NJ-CT-PA CSA	22,535,017; 62,808 (PA)	New York-Newark-Jersey City, NY-NJ MSA	20,112,448	Queens County, New York	2,358,182	New York-Jersey City-White Plains, NY-NJ MD	12,300,480
New York-Newark, NY-NJ-CT-PA CSA	22,535,017; 62,808 (PA)	New York-Newark-Jersey City, NY-NJ MSA	20,112,448	New York County, New York	1,664,862	New York-Jersey City-White Plains, NY-NJ MD	12,300,480
New York-Newark, NY-NJ-CT-PA CSA	22,535,017; 62,808 (PA)	New York-Newark-Jersey City, NY-NJ MSA	20,112,448	Bronx County, New York	1,406,332	New York-Jersey City-White Plains, NY-NJ MD	12,300,480
New York-Newark, NY-NJ-CT-PA CSA	22,535,017; 62,808 (PA)	New York-Newark-Jersey City, NY-NJ MSA	20,112,448	Westchester County, New York	1,015,743	New York-Jersey City-White Plains, NY-NJ MD	12,300,480
New York-Newark, NY-NJ-CT-PA CSA	22,535,017; 62,808 (PA)	New York-Newark-Jersey City, NY-NJ MSA	20,112,448	Bergen County, New Jersey	977,026	New York-Jersey City-White Plains, NY-NJ MD	12,300,480
New York-Newark, NY-NJ-CT-PA CSA	22,535,017; 62,808 (PA)	New York-Newark-Jersey City, NY-NJ MSA	20,112,448	Hudson County, New Jersey	735,033	New York-Jersey City-White Plains, NY-NJ MD	12,300,480
New York-Newark, NY-NJ-CT-PA CSA	22,535,017; 62,808 (PA)	New York-Newark-Jersey City, NY-NJ MSA	20,112,448	Passaic County, New Jersey	531,624	New York-Jersey City-White Plains, NY-NJ MD	12,300,480
New York-Newark, NY-NJ-CT-PA CSA	22,535,017; 62,808 (PA)	New York-Newark-Jersey City, NY-NJ MSA	20,112,448	Richmond County, New York	501,290	New York-Jersey City-White Plains, NY-NJ MD	12,300,480
New York-Newark, NY-NJ-CT-PA CSA	22,535,017; 62,808 (PA)	New York-Newark-Jersey City, NY-NJ MSA	20,112,448	Rockland County, New York	357,397	New York-Jersey City-White Plains, NY-NJ MD	12,300,480
New York-Newark, NY-NJ-CT-PA CSA	22,535,017; 62,808 (PA)	New York-Newark-Jersey City, NY-NJ MSA	20,112,448	Putnam County, New York	99,028	New York-Jersey City-White Plains, NY-NJ MD	12,300,480
New York-Newark, NY-NJ-CT-PA CSA	22,535,017; 62,808 (PA)	New York-Newark-Jersey City, NY-NJ MSA	20,112,448	Suffolk County, New York	1,546,090	Nassau County-Suffolk County, NY MD	2,945,029
New York-Newark, NY-NJ-CT-PA CSA	22,535,017; 62,808 (PA)	New York-Newark-Jersey City, NY-NJ MSA	20,112,448	Nassau County, New York	1,398,939	Nassau County-Suffolk County, NY MD	2,945,029
New York-Newark, NY-NJ-CT-PA CSA	22,535,017; 62,808 (PA)	New York-Newark-Jersey City, NY-NJ MSA	20,112,448	Middlesex County, New Jersey	883,335	Lakewood-New Brunswick, NJ MD	2,564,602
New York-Newark, NY-NJ-CT-PA CSA	22,535,017; 62,808 (PA)	New York-Newark-Jersey City, NY-NJ MSA	20,112,448	Ocean County, New Jersey	673,746	Lakewood-New Brunswick, NJ MD	2,564,602
New York-Newark, NY-NJ-CT-PA CSA	22,535,017; 62,808 (PA)	New York-Newark-Jersey City, NY-NJ MSA	20,112,448	Monmouth County, New Jersey	651,035	Lakewood-New Brunswick, NJ MD	2,564,602
New York-Newark, NY-NJ-CT-PA CSA	22,535,017; 62,808 (PA)	New York-Newark-Jersey City, NY-NJ MSA	20,112,448	Somerset County, New Jersey	356,486	Lakewood-New Brunswick, NJ MD	2,564,602
New York-Newark, NY-NJ-CT-PA CSA	22,535,017; 62,808 (PA)	New York-Newark-Jersey City, NY-NJ MSA	20,112,448	Essex County, New Jersey	896,379	Newark, NJ MD	2,302,337
New York-Newark, NY-NJ-CT-PA CSA	22,535,017; 62,808 (PA)	New York-Newark-Jersey City, NY-NJ MSA	20,112,448	Union County, New Jersey	601,863	Newark, NJ MD	2,302,337
New York-Newark, NY-NJ-CT-PA CSA	22,535,017; 62,808 (PA)	New York-Newark-Jersey City, NY-NJ MSA	20,112,448	Morris County, New Jersey	524,251	Newark, NJ MD	2,302,337
New York-Newark, NY-NJ-CT-PA CSA	22,535,017; 62,808 (PA)	New York-Newark-Jersey City, NY-NJ MSA	20,112,448	Sussex County, New Jersey	148,063	Newark, NJ MD	2,302,337
New York-Newark, NY-NJ-CT-PA CSA	22,535,017; 62,808 (PA)	New York-Newark-Jersey City, NY-NJ MSA	20,112,448	Hunterdon County, New Jersey	131,781	Newark, NJ MD	2,302,337
New York-Newark, NY-NJ-CT-PA CSA	22,535,017; 62,808 (PA)	Bridgeport-Stamford-Danbury, CT MSA	951,558	Western Connecticut Planning Region, Connecticut	640,482	none	
New York-Newark, NY-NJ-CT-PA CSA	22,535,017; 62,808 (PA)	Bridgeport-Stamford-Danbury, CT MSA	951,558	Greater Bridgeport Planning Region, Connecticut	337,697	none	
New York-Newark, NY-NJ-CT-PA CSA	22,535,017; 62,808 (PA)	Kiryas Joel-Poughkeepsie-Newburgh, NY MSA	718,377	Orange County, New York	417,669	none	
New York-Newark, NY-NJ-CT-PA CSA	22,535,017; 62,808 (PA)	Kiryas Joel-Poughkeepsie-Newburgh, NY MSA	718,377	Dutchess County, New York	300,708	none	
New York-Newark, NY-NJ-CT-PA CSA	22,535,017; 62,808 (PA)	Trenton-Princeton, NJ MSA	399,289	Mercer County, New Jersey	399,289	none	
New York-Newark, NY-NJ-CT-PA CSA	22,535,017; 62,808 (PA)	Kingston, NY MSA	183,330	Ulster County, New York	183,330	none	
New York-Newark, NY-NJ-CT-PA CSA	22,535,017; 62,808 (PA)	Monticello, NY μSA	80,586	Sullivan County, New York	80,586	none	
New York-Newark, NY-NJ-CT-PA CSA	22,535,017; 62,808 (PA)	Hemlock Farms, PA μSA	62,808	Pike County, Pennsylvania	62,808	none	
none		Sayre, PA μSA	59,600	Bradford County, Pennsylvania	59,600	none	
none		Oil City, PA μSA	49,346	Venango County, Pennsylvania	49,346	none	
none		Lewistown, PA μSA	46,127	Mifflin County, Pennsylvania	46,127	none	
none		Bradford, PA μSA	38,984	McKean County, Pennsylvania	38,984	none	
none		Warren, PA μSA	37,038	Warren County, Pennsylvania	37,038	none	
none		St. Marys, PA μSA	29,926	Elk County, Pennsylvania	29,926	none	
none		none		Wayne County, Pennsylvania	51,703	none	
none		none		Bedford County, Pennsylvania	47,480	none	
none		none		Jefferson County, Pennsylvania	43,255	none	
none		none		Tioga County, Pennsylvania	40,502	none	
none		none		Susquehanna County, Pennsylvania	38,237	none	
none		none		Clarion County, Pennsylvania	36,680	none	
none		none		Greene County, Pennsylvania	33,885	none	
none		none		Juniata County, Pennsylvania	23,403	none	
none		none		Potter County, Pennsylvania	15,897	none	
none		none		Fulton County, Pennsylvania	14,483	none	
none		none		Forest County, Pennsylvania	6,614	none	
none		none		Sullivan County, Pennsylvania	5,856	none	
none		none		Cameron County, Pennsylvania	4,211	none	
Commonwealth of Pennsylvania					13,059,432	none	

The 36 core-based statistical areas of the Commonwealth of Pennsylvania (Note: For CBSAs comprising populations from multiple states, they are listed twice to show both their intrastate population within that CBSA as well as the CBSA's total population. Only the intrastate population is ranked.)
2025 rank	Core-based statistical area	Population				
2025 rank	Core-based statistical area	2025 estimate	Change	2020 Census	Change	2010 Census
1	Philadelphia-Camden-Wilmington, PA-NJ-DE-MD MSA (PA)	4,237,805	+0.47%	4,218,131	+5.22%	4,008,994
2	Pittsburgh, PA MSA	2,421,992	−1.42%	2,457,000	+0.39%	2,447,393
3	Allentown-Bethlehem-Easton, PA-NJ MSA (PA)	774,662	+2.98%	752,257	+5.58%	712,481
4	Harrisburg-Carlisle, PA MSA	617,427	+4.35%	591,712	+7.69%	549,475
5	Scranton--Wilkes-Barre, PA MSA	574,418	+1.21%	567,559	+0.70%	563,631
6	Lancaster, PA MSA	563,159	+1.84%	552,984	+6.46%	519,445
7	York-Hanover, PA MSA	473,197	+3.67%	456,438	+4.94%	434,972
8	Reading, PA MSA	440,072	+2.62%	428,849	+4.23%	411,442
9	Erie, PA MSA	265,832	−1.86%	270,876	−3.45%	280,566
10	East Stroudsburg, PA μSA	167,179	−0.68%	168,327	−0.89%	169,842
11	Chambersburg, PA MSA	160,652	+3.03%	155,932	+4.22%	149,618
12	State College, PA MSA	157,393	−0.49%	158,172	+2.72%	153,990
13	Lebanon, PA MSA	146,380	+2.18%	143,257	+7.25%	133,568
14	Pottsville, PA μSA	145,085	+1.42%	143,049	−3.53%	148,289
15	Johnstown, PA MSA	128,968	−3.37%	133,472	−7.10%	143,679
16	Altoona, PA MSA	119,541	−2.67%	122,822	−3.36%	127,089
17	Williamsport, PA MSA	112,587	−1.40%	114,188	−1.66%	116,111
18	Hermitage, PA μSA	107,860	−2.52%	110,652	−5.13%	116,638
19	Sunbury, PA μSA	107,788	−1.82%	109,783	−2.67%	112,795
20	Gettysburg, PA MSA	107,594	+3.60%	103,852	+2.41%	101,407
21	Indiana, PA μSA	82,878	−0.44%	83,246	−6.34%	88,880
22	Meadville, PA μSA	81,792	−2.56%	83,938	−5.44%	88,765
23	DuBois, PA μSA	78,100	−3.06%	80,562	−1.32%	81,642
24	Somerset, PA μSA	72,004	−2.87%	74,129	−4.65%	77,742
25	Bloomsburg-Berwick, PA μSA	66,193	+2.26%	64,727	−3.82%	67,295
26	Hemlock Farms, PA μSA	62,808	+7.30%	58,535	+2.03%	57,369
27	Sayre, PA μSA	59,600	+1.84%	58,524	−6.54%	62,622
28	Oil City, PA μSA	49,346	−2.20%	50,454	−8.24%	54,984
29	Lewistown, PA μSA	46,127	−0.03%	46,143	−1.15%	46,682
30	Huntingdon, PA μSA	43,001	−2.47%	44,092	−3.97%	45,913
31	Lewisburg, PA μSA	42,313	−0.86%	42,681	−5.04%	44,947
32	Selinsgrove, PA μSA	39,655	−0.20%	39,736	+0.09%	39,702
33	Bradford, PA μSA	38,984	−3.58%	40,432	−6.95%	43,450
34	Lock Haven, PA μSA	37,870	+1.12%	37,450	−4.56%	39,238
35	Warren, PA μSA	37,038	−4.01%	38,587	−7.72%	41,815
36	St. Marys, PA μSA	29,926	−3.43%	30,990	−2.99%	31,946
	Allentown-Bethlehem-Easton, PA-NJ MSA	887,615	+2.98%	861,889	+4.96%	821,173
	Philadelphia-Camden-Wilmington, PA-NJ-DE-MD MSA	6,329,118	+1.35%	6,245,051	+9.65%	5,695,343

The 12 combined statistical area of the Commonwealth of Pennsylvania (Note: For CSAs comprising populations from multiple states, they are listed twice to show both their intrastate population within that CSA as well as the CSA's total population. Only the intrastate population is ranked. New York CSA's overall population is not listed due to lack of historic census data for Connecticut planning regions.)
2025 rank	Combined statistical area	Population				
2025 rank	Combined statistical area	2025 estimate	Change	2020 Census	Change	2010 Census
1	Philadelphia-Reading-Camden, PA-NJ-DE-MD CSA (PA)	4,677,877	+0.66%	4,646,980	+5.12%	4,420,436
2	Pittsburgh-Weirton-Steubenville, PA-OH-WV CSA (PA)	2,612,730	−1.44%	2,650,898	−0.08%	2,652,911
3	Harrisburg-York-Lebanon, PA CSA	1,344,598	+3.81%	1,295,259	+6.22%	1,219,422
4	Allentown-Bethlehem-East Stroudsburg, PA-NJ CSA (PA)	941,841	+2.31%	920,584	+4.34%	882,323
5	Erie-Meadville, PA CSA	347,624	−2.03%	354,814	−3.93%	369,331
6	Bloomsburg-Berwick-Sunbury, PA CSA	255,949	−0.38%	256,927	−2.95%	264,739
7	State College-DuBois, PA CSA	235,493	−1.36%	238,734	+1.32%	235,632
8	Johnstown-Somerset, PA CSA	200,972	−3.19%	207,601	−6.24%	221,421
9	Altoona-Huntingdon, PA CSA	162,542	−2.62%	166,914	−3.52%	173,002
10	Washington-Baltimore-Arlington, DC-MD-VA-WV-PA CSA (PA)	160,652	+3.03%	155,932	+4.22%	149,618
11	Williamsport-Lock Haven, PA CSA	150,457	−0.78%	151,638	−2.39%	155,349
12	New York-Newark, NY-NJ-CT-PA CSA (PA)	62,808	+7.30%	58,535	+2.03%	57,369
	Allentown-Bethlehem-East Stroudsburg PA-NJ CSA	1,054,794	+2.39%	1,030,216	+3.96%	991,015
	Philadelphia-Reading-Camden, PA-NJ-DE-MD CSA	7,493,171	+1.54%	7,379,700	+4.41%	7,067,807
	Pittsburgh-Weirton-Steubenville, PA-OH-WV CSA	2,725,198	−1.54%	2,767,801	−0.34%	2,777,365
	Washington-Baltimore-Arlington, DC-MD-VA-WV-PA CSA	10,274,894	+2.46%	10,028,331	+10.17%	9,102,983

== See also ==
- Geography of Pennsylvania
  - Demographics of Pennsylvania
