= Queen, Pennsylvania =

Unincorporated community in Pennsylvania, US

- Unincorporated community
- Location within Pennsylvania
- Coordinates: 40°15′33″N 78°30′27″W
- Country: United States
- State: Pennsylvania
- County: Bedford
- Elevation: 1,286 ft (392 m)
- Time zone: UTC-5 (Eastern (EST))
  - Summer (DST): UTC-4 (EDT)
- ZIP code: 16670
- Area code: 814
- GNIS feature ID: 1184536

Queen is an unincorporated community in Bedford County, Pennsylvania, United States. The community is 16.6 miles (26.7 km) north of Bedford. Queen had a post office until April 23, 2005; it retains its own ZIP code, 16670.
