= 201st Pennsylvania Infantry Regiment =

Union Army infantry regiment

201st Pennsylvania Volunteer Infantry
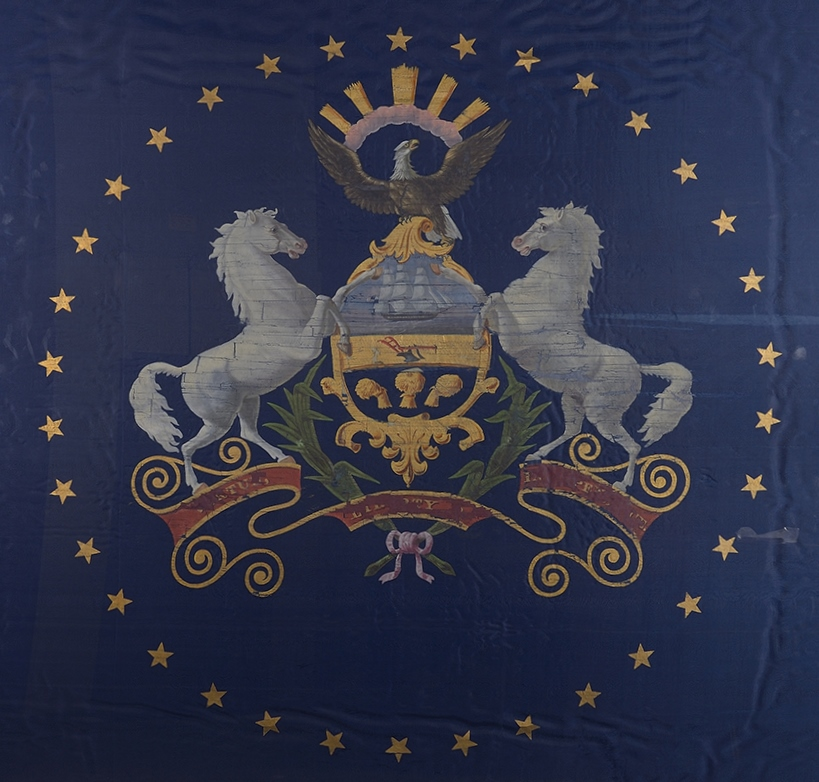
- State Flag of Pennsylvania, circa 1863.
- Active: 29 August 1864 – 21 June 1865
- Country: United States of America
- Allegiance: Union
- Branch: Union Army
- Role: Infantry

The 201st Regiment Pennsylvania Volunteer Infantry was an infantry regiment of the Union Army in the American Civil War. Raised in the Harrisburg, Pennsylvania area during August 1864, the regiment initially guarded the Manassas Gap Railroad and detachment elements on provost duty in Virginia. The regiment then moved to Alexandria in November, where it performed guard and escort duty. After the end of the war the main body of the regiment garrisoned Fort Delaware before mustering out in mid-1865.

== History ==
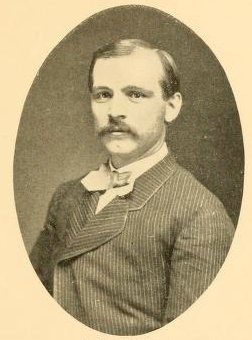
Colonel F. Asbury Awl, regimental commander

The 201st Pennsylvania was raised in the Harrisburg area during August 1864 for a one-year term in response to President Abraham Lincoln's call for 500,000 men. Within 30 days of the start of recruitment, it reached its required membership strength, and became the first of ten regiments to fulfill the state's assigned enrollment quota. Although the majority of its members were residents of Dauphin County, others came from Duncannon and Fairview, in Perry and Cumberland Counties while part of Company K was composed of men from Franklin County. The regiment concentrated at Camp Curtin and was organized there on 29 August, under the command of Colonel F. Asbury Awl. Many of the 201st Pennsylvania's officers and enlisted men had served previously with other regiments from the state, including the entire group of field and staff officers who had fought with the 127th Pennsylvania Infantry at Fredericksburg and Chancellorsville.

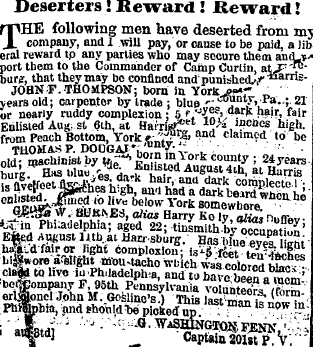
A newspaper reward notice for returning deserters from a company of the regiment

Shortly after its organization, the regiment moved to Chambersburg, where it encamped five miles from the town near the Black Creek crossing of the Chambersburg turnpike. After training at the camp, the 201st went on a three-day march for exercise on 12 September. Company H was sent to York for duty at the army hospital there on 17 September, while Companies F and G were sent to Bloody Run on the same day to join the Juniata District under General Orris S. Ferry. Company F soon transferred to McConnellsburg, and Companies F and G spent the northern hemisphere fall and winter arresting deserters, ultimately detaining nearly 500. Following the relief of Ferry in December, Major John T. Morgan of the regiment became district commander. Company E was moved to Scranton on 18 September, where it served on provost duty.

The six remaining companies went on a three-day exercise march alongside artillery on 22 September. The regiment began moving to Pittsburgh on 28 September, but when it reached Huntingdon the order was changed. The regiment instead entrained aboard the Washington and Alexandria Railroad to Manassas Junction, serving along the Manassas Gap Railroad with its headquarters at Gainesville. It later moved to Thoroughfare Gap, remaining there until the rail was broken up. This duty was to protect railroad work crews from being attacked by the Confederate partisan rangers of John Mosby.

The 201st moved to Alexandria on 13 November, where it was stationed at Camp Slough. For the rest of the war, the regiment served on guard duty in the city, in the defenses south of the Potomac, on railroad trains, and escorted recruits and stragglers towards the front. Many officers served on court martial boards, and Lieutenant Colonel J. Wesley Awl was appointed commander of the Alexandria Soldiers' Rest distribution camp in early May. Company G was sent to Pittsburgh on 24 May, where it served on provost duty. The main body of the regiment was ordered transferred to Fort Delaware on 26 May, and served there for the rest of its term. It was stationed at the fort alongside the 215th Pennsylvania Infantry, and helped to process Confederate prisoners of war for release. In mid-June the regiment concentrated at Harrisburg, where it mustered out on 21 June. During its service, the regiment suffered a total of sixteen deaths: one enlisted man killed and fifteen died of disease.

== See also ==
- List of Pennsylvania Civil War regiments
- Pennsylvania in the Civil War
