= 20th Pennsylvania Cavalry Regiment =

Union Army cavalry regiment

20th Pennsylvania Cavalry (181st Pennsylvania Volunteers)
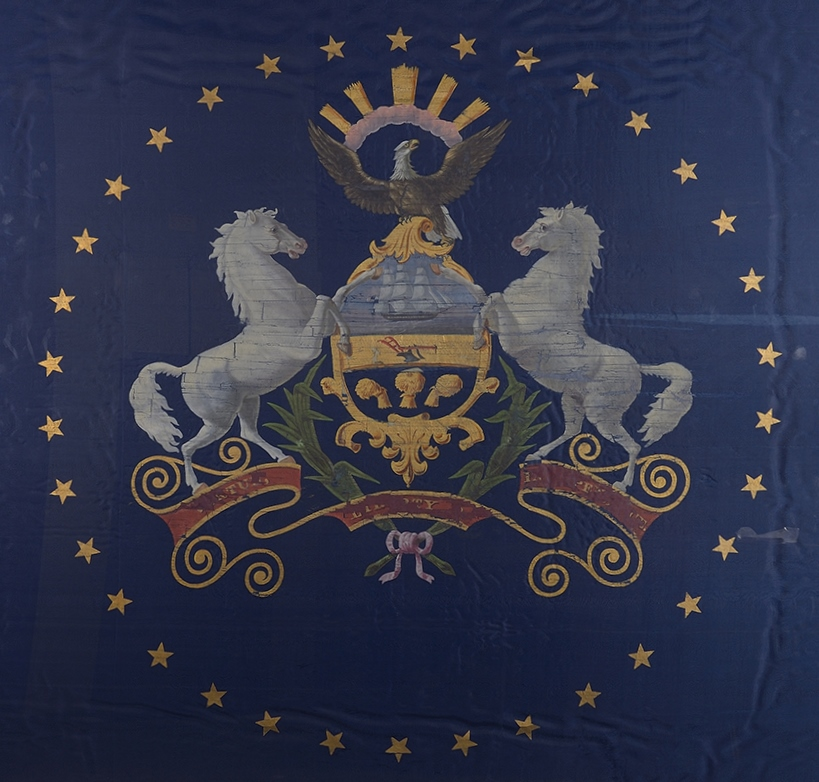
- State flag of Pennsylvania, c. 1863
- Active: June 1863 – June 17, 1865 (consolidated with the 2nd Pennsylvania Cavalry, which then mustered out July 13, 1865)
- Country: United States
- Allegiance: Union
- Branch: Infantry
- Size: Regiment
- Engagements: American Civil War: Battle of New Market; Battle of Lynchburg; Battle of Cool Spring; Valley Campaigns of 1864; Siege of Petersburg; Appomattox Campaign

Commanders
- Notable commanders: Colonel John E. Wynkoop

The 20th Pennsylvania Cavalry was a cavalry regiment of the Union Army which fought during the American Civil War. Also known as the 181st Pennsylvania Volunteers, it was initially led by Colonel John E. Wynkoop, Lieutenant Colonel William Rotch Wister, and Major Samuel W. Comly.

== History ==
Recruiting men from the counties of Bucks, Chester, Cumberland, Dauphin, Montgomery, and Union, as well as from the city of Philadelphia during June and July 1863, this regiment was composed of six companies of men who were commissioned for six months' service plus five companies of existing emergency militia units that had been assigned to picket and scout duties along the Susquehanna River and the roads leading toward Carlisle, Marysville and York during the Emergency of 1863 when regiments of the Confederate States Army invaded Pennsylvania.

Established in July 1863, the members of this regiment mustered in at Camp Couch near Harrisburg. On July 7, its men marched up the Cumberland Valley to Greencastle before being assigned to scout duty in Maryland. In partnership with three companies of the First New York Cavalry, a detachment of the 20th Pennsylvania was then assigned to follow the army of Confederate General Robert E. Lee to Hagerstown, near which it captured several prisoners and horses after engaging that army's rear-guard. After marching to Falling Waters, the regiment bivouacked there and performed picket duties along the Potomac River before being moved into camp near Clear Spring, Maryland.

Ordered to Sir John's Run, West Virginia in early August 1863, the regiment was next assigned to guard part of the Baltimore and Ohio Railroad, as well as sections of the countryside near Winchester. Companies F and I were stationed at Berkeley Springs under the command of Major Comly while Company C was moved to Hancock and Companies D and E were assigned to Bloomery Gap under Major Thorp. Companies A and H were assigned to Great Cacapon Station. Assigned to detached service under Major Douglass, the remaining five companies were splot between duty stations at Philadelphia, Pottsville and Reading; they did not rejoin the rest of the regiment until the final muster-out. Another hundred dismounted men remained behind at headquarters.

During an attack by Confederate cavalrymen on the Berkeley Springs command during the early part of September 1863, 20 members of the 20th Pennsylvania Cavalry were captured; horses and equipment were also lost. Afterward, the companies were once again stationed together — concentrated at headquarters. Daily scouting parties fired upon enemy scouts and snipers, but did not engage any great strength of the CSA during this time.

Brigaded with the 54th Pennsylvania, 15th Virginia, 1st Pennsylvania Battalion, and the 3rd Virginia Artillery, two of the 20th Pennsylvania's companies were then sent on a reconnaissance to the south of Romney. After venturing nearly a hundred miles into Virginia, they engaged and defeated part of Imboden's command, capturing a number of small arms and several prisoners, and destroying a piece of artillery in the process. After torching the Columbian Furnace, the 20th Pennsylvania returned to Springfield and, on December 24, was ordered back to Harrisburg, where the regiment was officially mustered out on January 7, 1864.

Reorganized and mustered in for three years' service in February, the 20th Pennsylvania Cavalry was led by Colonel John E. Wynkoop, Lieutenant Colonel Gabriel Middleton, and Majors J. Harry Thorp, Robert W. Douglass and W. W. Anderson, who later died at Harper's Ferry, Virginia.

Union and Confederate positions near New Market, Virginia, May 15, 1865.

Assigned to the command of General Sigel, who was in charge of the army in the Shenandoah Valley, the regiment engaged in an intense battle on May 15 as Sigel's army battled the troops of CSA General Breckenridge at New Market. The 20th Pennsylvania lost three men that day. Next placed under the command of Major-General David Hunter, who had taken over for Sigel, the 20th Pennsylvania Cavalry joined other Union troops in combat at Staunton on June 10, where it lost three men, and at New Glasgow on June 14, where it lost two more men.

The regiment then sustained far heavier casualties while engaged with Hunter's forces in the Battle of Lynchburg, beginning June 17. Retreating with Hunter's army into the Kanawha Valley, the regiment then moved with that army to Parkersburg and by rail to Martinsburg. On June 21, the regiment lost four more men while engaged in the fighting at Salem.

The 20th Pennsylvania Cavalry then became part of the Eighth Corps when General Crook succeeded Hunter as commander and, on July 18, lost an additional 14 men as it helped to defeat the forces of Early and Breckenridge at Snicker's Gap during the Battle of Cool Spring. Engaged in "a daring charge down the Winchester Pike" on July 24, according to historian Samuel P. Bates, the regiment was then ordered by Crook to attack the rear of CSA General Jubal Early's army. Moving by way of Ashby's Gap, the 20th Pennsylvania lost 118 in killed, wounded and missing during this phase of duty.

The 20th Pennsylvania then was placed under the command of General Philip Sheridan, who had taken over the Army of the Shenandoah. According to Bates, during the reorganization, "the Twentieth was assigned to the Second Brigade, of the First Division, General Devin in command," and subsequently participated in the Valley Campaigns of 1864 "in which a series of brilliant victories were gained, and the power of the enemy in the valley was completely annihilated, the subsistence of any considerable hostile force being rendered impossible." Afterward, the regiment was moved to winter quarters with its brigade, and assigned to guard and scout duty. Colonel Wynkoop then retired, and Lieutenant Colonel Middleton was placed in charge of the regiment.

On February 27, 1865, the regiment then rejoined Sheridan's campaign, which opened with a major cavalry raid of 10,000 riders on Lynchburg. After routing Early's forces at Waynesboro, Sheridan's men then also caused major damage to the James River Canal and Virginia Central Railroad. By March 27, they were collaborating with Grant in the Siege of Petersburg. Separated from the bulk of Sheridan's command while it was engaged in the actions near Dinwiddie Court House, the 20th Pennsylvania "united in the attack which was made on the morning of the 1st of April, by which the enemy was driven by impetuous charges from one line of works after another, until he finally took shelter behind his main fortifications, on the White Oak Road," according to Bates. Now engaged in the Appomattox Campaign, the cavalry was ordered to turn the CSA's right flank in order to free up the Fifth Corps to attack the enemy's left side. The maneuver was successful, and the 20th Pennsylvania Cavalry was commended for its valor, but as a regiment, it sustained heavy casualties.

Following the Lee's surrender on April 9 at Appomattox, the regiment was ordered back to Washington, D.C., where it marched in the Grand Review of the Armies. Consolidated with the 2nd Pennsylvania Cavalry on June 17, 1865, to form the 1st Pennsylvania Provisional Cavalry, which then mustered out on July 13 at Cloud's Mills, Virginia.

== See also ==
- List of Pennsylvania Civil War regiments
