= 169th Pennsylvania Infantry Regiment =

- Also known as the 169th Pennsylvania or the 169th Pennsylvania Volunteers
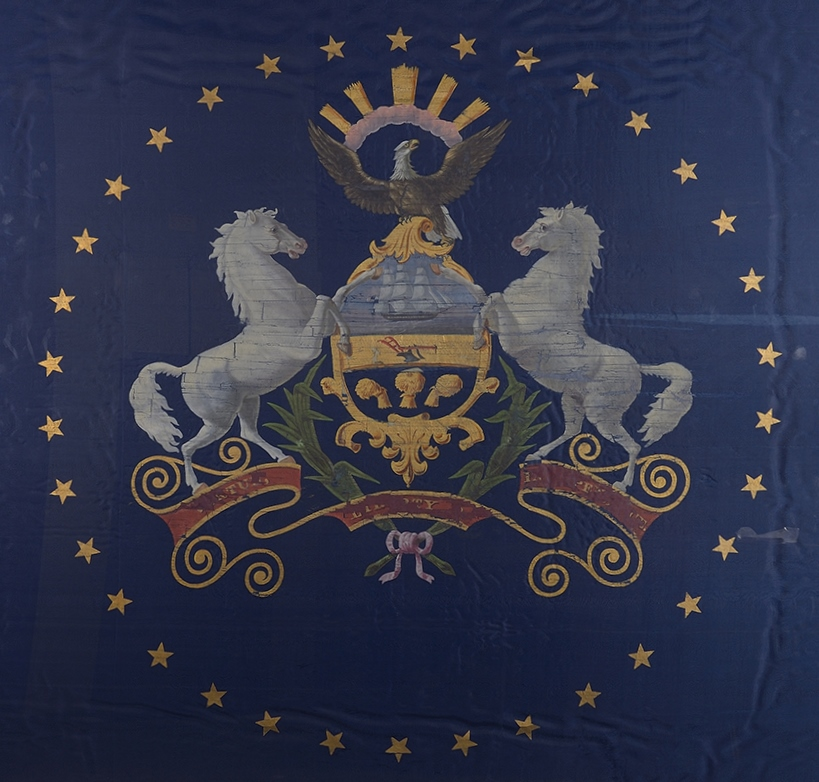
- State Flag of Pennsylvania Circa 1863
- Active: October 16, 1862 - June 27, 1863
- Country: United States
- Allegiance: Union
- Branch: Union Army
- Type: Infantry
- Size: Regiment
- Engagements: Expedition to Gloucester Court House (April 7, 1863); Expedition from Yorktown to Walkerton and Aylett's (June 4-5); Pursuit of Lee (July 5–12, 1863)

Commanders
- Notable commanders: Col. Lewis W. Smith; Lieutenant Col. Samuel M. Wickersham; Maj. William Smyth

The 169th Pennsylvania Infantry Regiment, was an infantry regiment that served with the Union Army during the American Civil War.

The regiment was organized in 1863, as a draftee-only regiment, and was sent to Fort Monroe and various points for drill and picket duties. The regiment was then sent to take part in the Pursuit of Lee's army after its defeat at Gettysburg, where it witnessed the final elements of the Confederate army disappear into Virginia. The regiment was mustered out in 1863 once their enlistments had ended.

== Organization ==
When Pennsylvania did not meet Lincoln's August 1862 request for 300,000 nine-month volunteers, the Commonwealth drafted fifteen regiments between mid-October and early December, totaling 15,000 men. All fifteen regiments were mustered out of service by mid-August 1863. Few saw any combat action.

The regiment was organized at Camp Howe, a camp near Pittsburgh, Pennsylvania October 16, 1862.

the companies of the regiment were recruited principally from:

- Company A - Mercer County
- Company B - Clarion County
- Company C - Mercer County
- Company D - Crawford County
- Company E - Butler County
- Company F - Erie County
- Company G - Erie County
- Company H - Crawford County
- Company I - Crawford County
- Company K - Crawford County

== Service ==
The regiment remained on Camp Howe until December 1, when it marched on Washington D.C., and was ordered to Fort Monroe on the evening of December 5, to report to General Dix of the Department of Virginia. On the morning of December 7, the regiment was sent to Yorktown, and then to Gloucester Point, where it was trained and were performing guard and picket duty. Near the end of December, the regiment was sent to Fort Keyes, for guard and picket duties.

During this period, the regiment sent out detachments to be sent out in expeditions. During one of these expeditions, Corporal Lewis Eaton, shot and wounded a Confederate colonel, before taking his sword and trappings. The regiment continued to be stationed in Fort Keyes, despite several men of the regiment dying due to sickness during the winter and spring of 1863.

On July 9, 1863, the regiment moved to Washington D.C, via transports and then marched to Funkstown, to be assigned to XI Corps. The regiment participated in the pursuit of Lee's army after their defeat at Gettysburg, where it witnessed Confederate pickets retreating alongside the Confederate column. The regiment made a rapid march to Williamsport, arriving just in time to engage with the Confederate rearguard, and witnessed the final Confederate supply trains to escape into Virginia.

On the following day, the regiment was detached from XI Corps and marched back to Harrisburg, where it was mustered out of Service on July 27, 1863.

== Organizational affiliation, battle honors and detailed service ==
=== Organizational affiliation ===
During its service, the regiment was assigned to various larger formations, those were:

- Attached to Busteed's Independent Brigade, Yorktown, Va., 4th Corps, Dept. of Virginia, to April, 1863.
- King's Independent Brigade, 4th Corps, Dept. of Virginia, to June, 1863.
- 1st Division, 4th Corps, Dept. of Virginia, to July, 1863.
- 1st Brigade, 3rd Division, 11th Army Corps, Army of the Potomac, to muster out.

=== Battle honors ===
The regiment have participated in battles and expeditions such as:

- Expedition to Gloucester Court House April 7.
- Expedition from Yorktown to Walkerton and Aylett's June 4-5.
- Dix's Peninsula Campaign June 27-July 7.

=== Detailed service ===
==== 1862 ====
- Organized at Pittsburg October 16, 1862.
- Duty at Camp Howe, Pittsburg, till December 1.
- Moved to Washington, D. C., thence to Fortress Monroe and Yorktown, Va., December 1-7, and to Gloucester Point, Va., December 8.

==== 1863 ====
- Duty at Yorktown and Gloucester Point, Va., till June, 1863.
- Expedition to Gloucester Court House April 7.
- Expedition from Yorktown to Walkerton and Aylett's June 4-5.
- Dix's Peninsula Campaign June 27-July 7.
- Ordered to Washington, D. C., July 9; thence march to Funkstown, Md. Joined Army of the Potomac at Hagerstown, Md., July 14.
- Pursuit of Lee to Williamsport, Md. Moved to Harrisburg, Pa., via Baltimore and Philadelphia.
- Mustered out July 27, 1863.

== Casualties ==
The regiment lost 11 men via disease

== Commanders ==
- Col. Lewis W. Smith
- Lieutenant Col. Samuel M. Wickersham
- Maj. William Smyth

== See also ==
- List of Pennsylvania units in the American Civil War
- Pennsylvania in the American Civil War
