= 133rd Pennsylvania Infantry Regiment =

Union Army infantry regiment

133rd Pennsylvania Volunteer Infantry
- Active: August 1862 to May 26, 1863
- Country: United States
- Allegiance: Union
- Branch: Infantry
- Engagements: Battle of Antietam; Battle of Fredericksburg; Battle of Chancellorsville

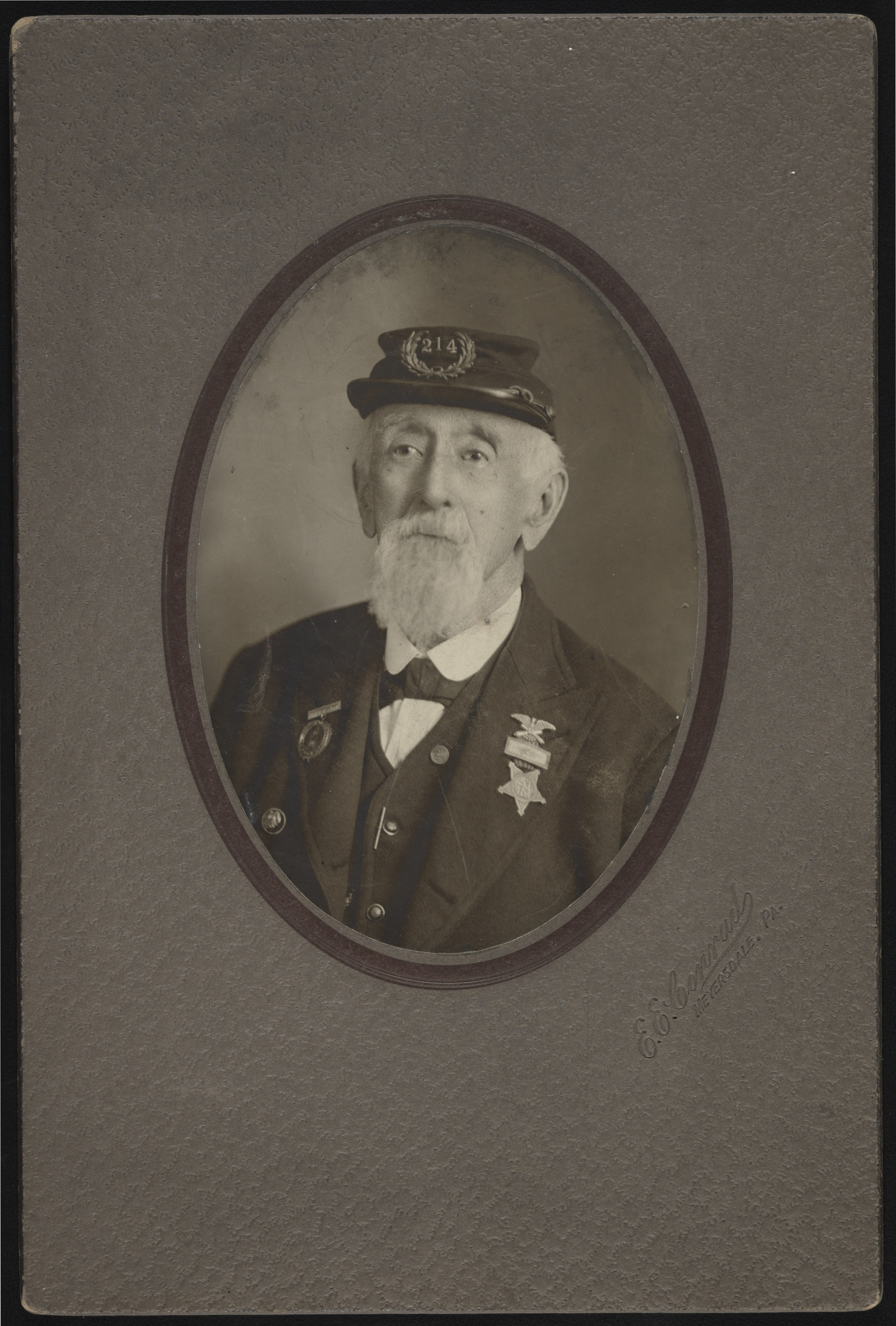
J.D.M. Armburst of Co. B, 133rd Pennsylvania Infantry Regiment. From the Liljenquist Family Collection of Civil War Photographs, Prints and Photographs Division, Library of Congress

The 133rd Pennsylvania Volunteer Infantry was an infantry regiment that served in the Union Army during the American Civil War.

== Service ==
The 133rd Pennsylvania Infantry was organized at Camp Curtin near Harrisburg, Pennsylvania, and mustered in August 1862 for nine month's service under the command of Colonel Franklin B. Speakman.

The regiment was attached to 2nd Brigade, 3rd Division, V Corps, Army of the Potomac.

The 133rd Pennsylvania Infantry mustered out May 26, 1863.

== Detailed service ==
The regiment initially moved to Washington, DC for duty from August 19, 1862, to September 2 of the same year; it subsequently moved to Rockville, Maryland for duty until October 30, when it moved to Falmouth, Virginia for several weeks. The regiment fought in the Battle of Fredericksburg from December 12–15, and was part of General Ambrose Burnside's second campaign, nicknamed the "Mud March" from January 20–24, 1863. During spring of 1863, the regiment was located in Falmouth, until April 27, when it departed to take part in the Chancellorsville campaign, participating in the Battle of Chancellorsville from May 1–5 of 1863. Enlisted in the regiment was Private John Suhre, who was mortally wounded at Fredericksburg and whose last days are described by Louisa May Alcott in her short novel Hospital Sketches.

== Casualties ==
The regiment lost a total of 77 men during service; 4 officers and 40 enlisted men killed or mortally wounded, 33 enlisted men died of disease.

== Commanders ==
- Colonel Franklin B. Speakman

== See also ==
- List of Pennsylvania Civil War Units
- Pennsylvania in the Civil War
