= 206th Pennsylvania Infantry Regiment =

Union Army infantry regiment

206th Pennsylvania Volunteer Infantry
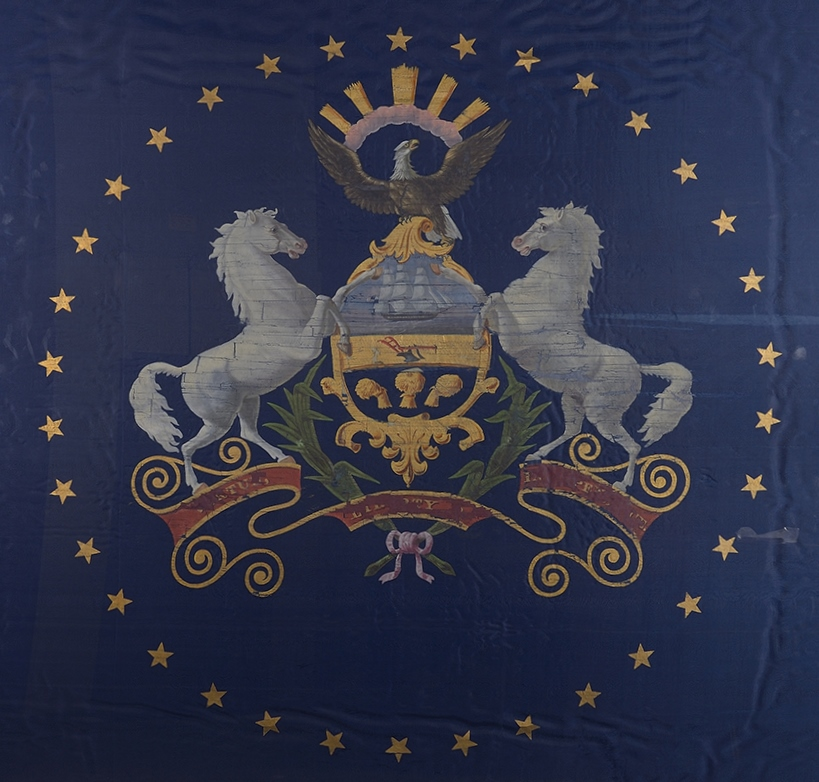
- State Flag of Pennsylvania, circa 1863.
- Active: 8 September 1864–26 June 1865
- Country: United States of America
- Allegiance: Union
- Branch: Union Army
- Role: Infantry
- Engagements: American Civil War

Insignia
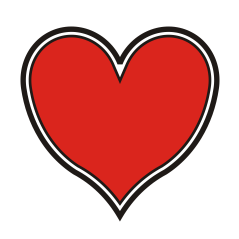
- Badge of 1st Division, XXIV Corps

The 206th Regiment Pennsylvania Volunteer Infantry was an infantry regiment of the Union Army in the American Civil War. Raised in the Pittsburgh area in August and September 1864, the regiment was sent to the Army of the James at Bermuda Hundred during the Siege of Petersburg. The regiment remained in camp during the Third Battle of Petersburg and instead marched into Richmond after its evacuation. After serving on provost duty in Virginia, it was mustered out in late June 1865.

== History ==
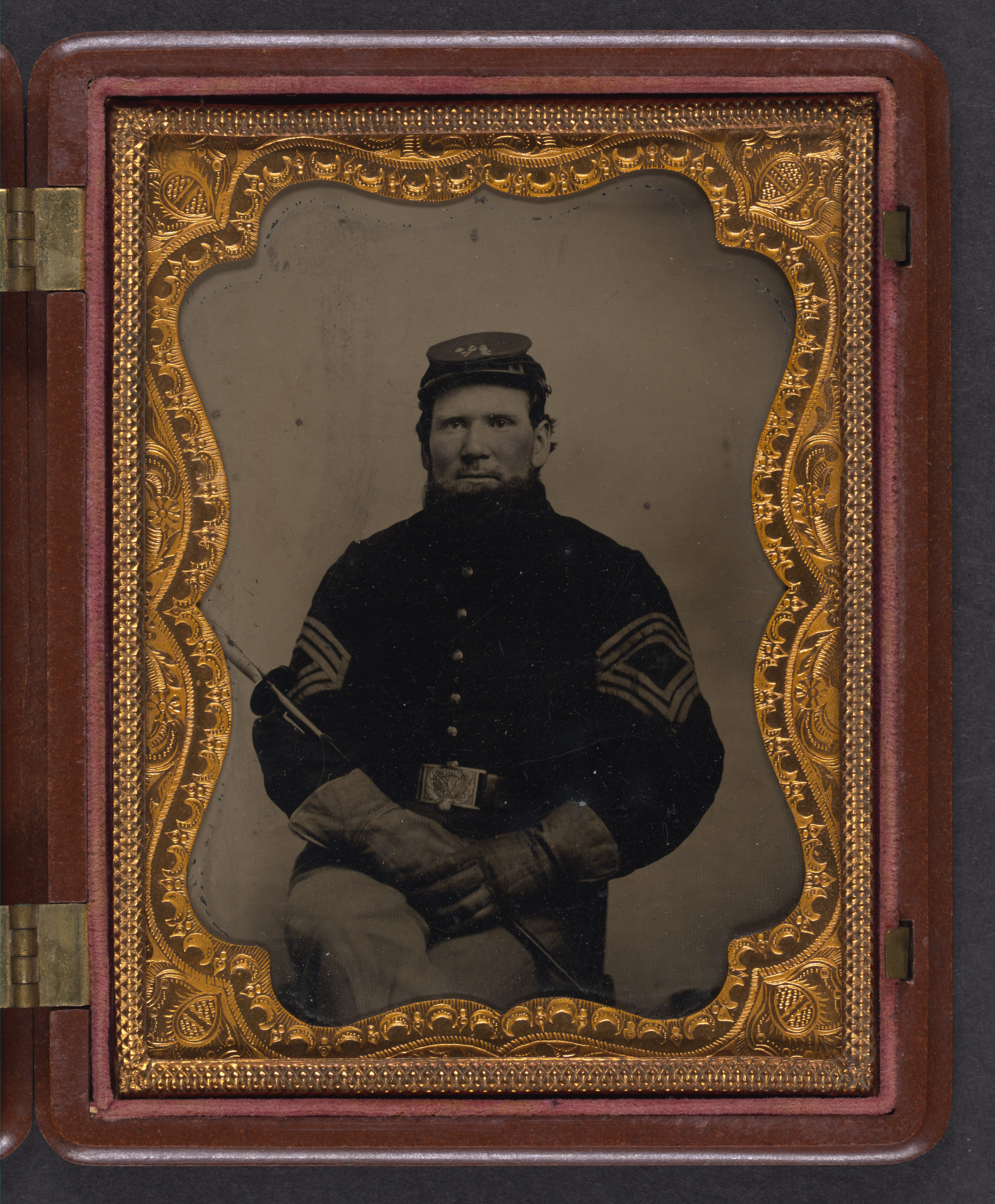
An unidentified sergeant major of the regiment, possibly Hugh Brady

The 206th Pennsylvania was raised in the Pittsburgh area during August 1864 for a one-year term in response to President Abraham Lincoln's call for 500,000 men. It was organized under the command of Colonel Hugh J. Brady at Camp Reynolds near Pittsburgh on 8 September. All companies were recruited in Indiana County except for Company B in Jefferson and Companies E and K in Westmoreland; most of its officers and men were veterans, including Brady, who had previously served as Lieutenant Colonel of the 177th Pennsylvania Infantry, and a large number of 135th Pennsylvania Infantry veteran enlisted men. The 206th was ordered to Washington, D.C., on the day after its organization, but it was diverted at Baltimore to City Point, where it joined a provisional brigade in the XVIII Corps of the Army of the James. The regiment took positions on the Bermuda Hundred front, and on 4 October was placed on engineer duty. It crossed to the north bank of the James on that day and worked to construct a fort one mile north of Dutch Gap under Confederate fire, losing one man killed and several wounded. The regiment was commended by army commander Benjamin Butler for its skill and the fort was named Fort Brady in recognition.

The 206th was transferred to the X Corps on 26 October and joined the 3rd Brigade of its 1st Division, along with the 11th Maine, 24th Massachusetts, 10th Connecticut, and 100th New York. Shortly afterwards, it went into winter quarters north of Fort Harrison, and continued training while on normal camp duties for the next several months. The regiment became part of the 1st Division of XXIV Corps on 3 December when X Corps was split. On 27 March, when the Army of the James began its movement to attack positions for the Petersburg breakthrough, the 206th was detached from the brigade and attached to the 3rd Division, remaining in camp on provost duty in spite of protests from the regiment. Brady was ordered to organize the convalescents of the 1st Division in preparation for movement. After the breakthrough, the 206th was among the first units to march into Richmond unopposed on 3 April, to discover that the Confederate forces had evacuated. Between 29 March and 9 April, the regiment suffered casualties of seven wounded and one officer and one man captured or missing, for a total of nine.

The regiment was subordinated to the Military Governor of Richmond for provost duty in the city on 22 April. It briefly returned to the 1st Brigade a month later; Brady took command of the latter as the senior officer. The regiment was detached for provost duty in Lynchburg, where it arrived on 30 May, for two weeks, then returned to the brigade at Richmond. The 206th was mustered out of Federal service on 26 June; its men returned to Pittsburgh and disbanded on 21 July. During its service, the regiment suffered a total of thirty deaths: one enlisted man killed and twenty-nine died of disease.

== See also ==
- List of Pennsylvania Civil War regiments
- Pennsylvania in the Civil War
