= 128th Pennsylvania Infantry Regiment =

Union Army infantry regiment

128th Pennsylvania Volunteer Infantry
- Active: August 14, 1862 to May 19, 1863
- Country: United States
- Allegiance: Union
- Branch: Infantry
- Engagements: Battle of Antietam; Battle of Chancellorsville

The 128th Pennsylvania Volunteer Infantry was an infantry regiment that served in the Union Army during the American Civil War.

== Service ==
The 128th Pennsylvania Infantry was organized at Camp Curtin near Harrisburg, Pennsylvania, and mustered in August 14, 1862 under the command of Colonel Samuel Croasdale.

The regiment was attached to 1st Brigade, 1st Division, XII Corps, Army of the Potomac.

The 128th Pennsylvania Infantry mustered out May 19, 1863.

== Detailed service ==
Left Pennsylvania for Washington, D.C., August 16, and duty there until September 6. Moved to Frederick, Md., September 6–14. Battle of Antietam, Md., September 16–17. At Sandy Hook and Maryland Heights September 22 to December 10. Moved to Fairfax Station, Va., December 10–14. Duty there until January 19, 1863. Moved to Stafford Court House January 19–23, and duty there until April 27. Chancellorsville Campaign April 27 – May 6. Battle of Chancellorsville May 1–5.

== Casualties ==
The regiment lost a total of 59 men during service; 2 officers and 31 enlisted men killed or mortally wounded, 26 enlisted men died of disease. More than half the regiment was surrounded and captured at the Battle of Chancellorsville (9 officers and 225 men).

== Commanders ==
- Colonel Samuel Croasdale – killed in action at the Battle of Antietam
- Colonel Joseph A. Mathews – captured at the Battle of Chancellorsville
- Lieutenant Colonel William W. Hammersly – commanded at the Battle of Antietam after Col. Croasdale was killed in action until wounded in action; resigned January 1863 due to his wounds received at Antietam
- Major Joel B. Wanner – commanded at the Battle of Antietam after Ltc. Hammersly was wounded in action

== Notable members ==
- Corporal Ignatz Gresser, Company D – Medal of Honor recipient for action at the Battle of Antietam

== See also ==
- List of Pennsylvania Civil War Units
- Pennsylvania in the Civil War
