= 176th Pennsylvania Infantry Regiment =

Unit in the American Civil War

- Also known as the 176th Pennsylvania or the 176th Pennsylvania Volunteers
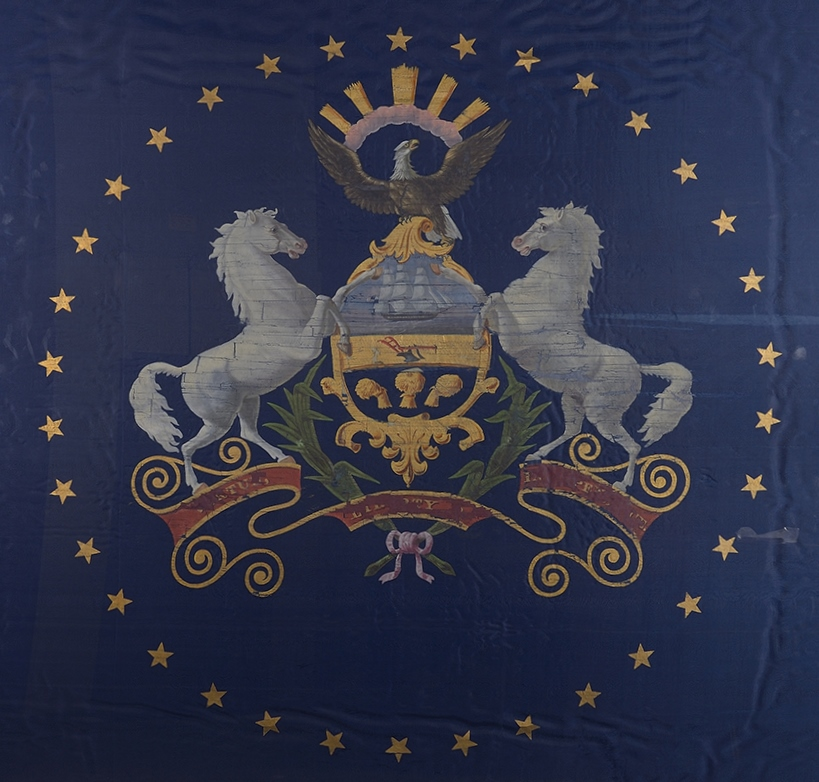
- Active: November 3 and 11, 1862 - August 17 and 19, 1863
- Country: United States
- Allegiance: Union
- Branch: Union Army
- Type: Infantry
- Role: Picket, Provost and Fatigue duties
- Size: 1,325
- Part of: VII Corps; XVIII Corps; X Corps
- Engagements: None

Commanders
- Notable commanders: Colonel Ambrose A. Lechler; Lieutenant Colonel George Pilkington; Major William Schoonover

The 176th Pennsylvania Infantry Regiment, also known as the 176th Pennsylvania Volunteer Infantry Regiment, was an infantry regiment that served with the Union army during the American Civil War. Composed of drafted men from the counties of Lehigh and Monroe, the regiment would serve its nine months' service primarily in South Carolina, conducting non-combat duties, with them not participating in any field operations.

== Organization ==
When Pennsylvania did not meet President Lincoln's August 1862 request for 300,000 nine-month volunteers, the Commonwealth drafted (under the Federal Militia Act of 1862) fifteen regiments between mid-October and early December 1862, totaling 15,000 men. All fifteen regiments were mustered out of service by mid-August 1863. Few saw any combat action.

When local and county officials in Pennsylvania were unable to raise enough bounty money to recruit volunteers, the state relied on the draft. On October 16, 1862, amidst anti-war sentiment and opposition to the draft. Lehigh County assessed that they required 1,462 able-bodied men between 21 and 45 years for the 1862 draft.

The regiment was composed of 10 companies, 7 from Lehigh County and 3 from Monroe County, with the majority of Company A being recruited from Millerstown and Lower Macungie Township. The regiment included several men who had previously served in the 54th Pennsylvania's regimental band. In total, the regiment numbered over 1,325 men.

The companies of this regiment were recruited from the counties of:

- A - Lehigh County
- B - Lehigh County
- C - Monroe County
- D - Lehigh County
- E - Lehigh County
- F - Monroe County
- G - Lehigh County
- H - Monroe County
- I - Lehigh County
- K - Lehigh County

The recruits were assembled at Camp Philadelphia on October 30, which was a rendezvous point for drafted men from eastern Pennsylvania, despite the camp being unruly and disorganized, with the Allentown Democrat reporting on November 5, 1862: "The whole thing is conducted like a disorderly camp meeting - everyone his own boss and doing pretty much as he pleases..." Nevertheless, The regiment was organized from November 3–11, 1862, and mustered into service for a nine-month term.

== Service ==
On November 27, 1862, the regiment left Camp Philadelphia, subsequently leaving the state and moving to Washington, D.C., and to Suffolk, Virginia, where they were attached to Foster's Brigade of VII Corps, undergoing a month of rigorous training and drill there.

On December 31, 1862, the regiment was transferred to New Berne, North Carolina, and was attached to the 1st Brigade, 2nd Division of XVIII Corps. In late January 1863, Col. Robert S. Foster, who was in command of a provisional brigade where the 176th was attached to, was ordered to launch an expedition to reinforce Union troops operating against the Confederate defenses in Charleston, South Carolina. The brigade would sail from South Carolina and would arrive at Port Royal Harbor, South Carolina, on February 5. The regiment would be stationed there for a week.

For the remainder of their service, the regiment continue to operate within the Department of the South, now attached to the X Corps, and would be stationed at several locations, such as St. Helena Island, Port Royal Island and Hilton Head Island, performing picket, provost and fatigue duties, while the regiment was stationed at Port Royal Island on June 3, 1863, the regiment was present for the arrival of the 54th Massachusetts.

Upon expiration of their nine months' service, the 176th was ordered back to Harrisburg, Pennsylvania, where it was mustered out of Service between August 17 and 19, 1863.

== Commanders ==
- Colonel Ambrose A. Lechler
- Lieutenant Colonel George Pilkington
- Major William Schoonover

== Casualties ==
The regiment lost 44 men to disease.

== See also ==
- List of Pennsylvania Civil War regiments
- Pennsylvania in the Civil War
