= 174th Pennsylvania Infantry Regiment =

- Also known as the 174th Pennsylvania or the 174th Pennsylvania Volunteers
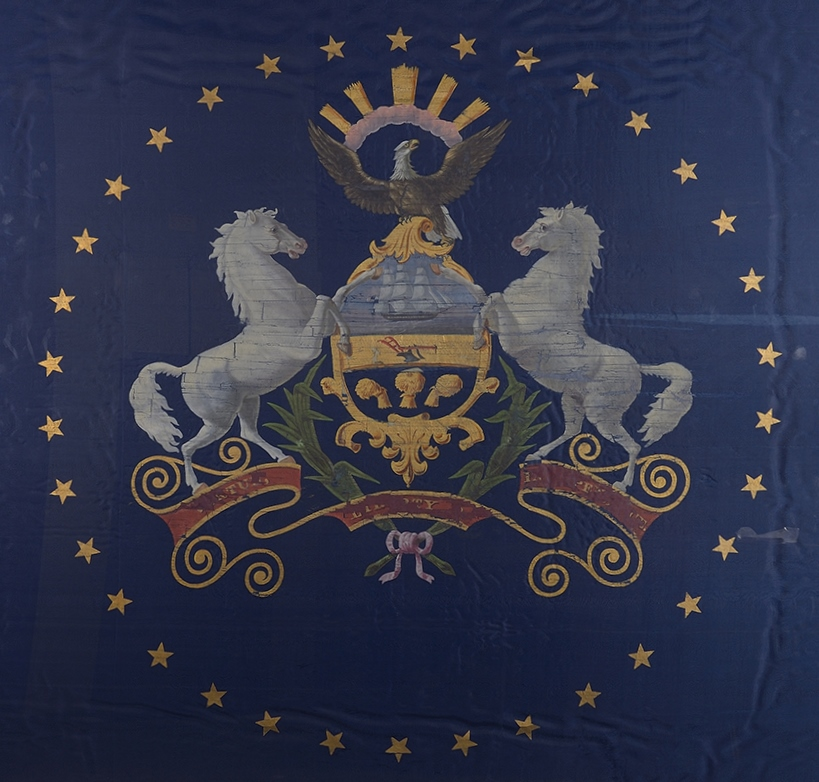
- State Flag of Pennsylvania (Circa 1863)
- Active: October to November, 1862 - August 7, 1863
- Country: United States
- Allegiance: Union
- Branch: Union Army
- Type: Infantry
- Size: 1,267
- Engagements: None

Commanders
- Notable commanders: Colonel John Nyce; Lieutenant Colonel Edward T. Hess; Major Joseph B. Roberts

The 174th Pennsylvania Volunteer Infantry Regiment, also known as the 174th Pennsylvania Infantry Regiment, was an infantry regiment that served with the Union army during the American Civil War. Composed of drafted men serving nine-month enlistments, the regiment spent its service conducting duty in the Departments of Virginia and North Carolina.

== Organization ==
When Pennsylvania did not meet President Lincoln's August 1862 request for 300,000 nine-month volunteers, the Commonwealth drafted (under the Federal Militia Act of 1862) fifteen regiments between mid-October and early December 1862, totaling 15,000 men. All fifteen regiments were mustered out of service by mid-August 1863. Few saw any combat action.

The regiment was organized at Philadelphia from October to November, 1862. The companies of the regiment were recruited from Northampton County and Bucks County. In all, the regiment was mustered with 1,267 men.

The companies of the regiment were recruited from:

- Company A - Bucks County
- Company B - Bucks County
- Company C - Bucks County
- Company D - Bucks County
- Company E - Bucks County
- Company F - Bucks County
- Company G - Bucks County
- Company H - Northampton County
- Company I - Northampton County
- Company K - Bucks County

== Service ==
After the regiment was mustered into service, it left the state for Washington, D.C., then moved to Suffolk, Virginia, where it reported to General John J. Peck and was attached to Ferry's Brigade of the VII Corps.

On December 31, the regiment was ordered to New Berne, North Carolina, on January 6, 1863. The regiment's deployment was shifted again, when General Foster was ordered to bring a part of his forces from North Carolina to reinforce the Union army operating in front of Charleston. The regiment sailed from Beaufort on January 27 and arrived at Hilton Head, South Carolina on February 5.

Upon arrival, it debarked to Helena Island, remaining there until February 27. The regiment then moved to Beaufort, where they were engaged in routine camp and garrison duties until June. The regiment was ordered back to Hilton Head.

Towards the end of July, the enlistment period of the regiment was close to expiring, the regiment headed back to Philadelphia. the 174th was mustered out of service in Philadelphia on August 7, 1863

The regiment was assigned to larger formations during its service, such as Ferry's Brigade, Division at Suffolk, Va., 7th Corps, Dept. of Virginia, to December, 1862, 2nd Brigade, 3rd Division, 18th Corps, Dept. of North Carolina, to February, 1863, 2nd Brigade, 2nd Division, 18th Corps, Dept. of the South, to February, 1863, District of Beaufort, S.C., 10th Corps, Dept. of the South, to June, 1863, and District of Hilton Head, S.C., 10th Corps, Dept. of the South, to August, 1863.

== Detailed service ==
=== 1862 ===
- Organized at Philadelphia, November 19, 1862.
- Moved to Washington, D.C., in November; thence to Suffolk, Va.
- Duty at Suffolk, Va., till December 31, 1862.

=== 1863 ===
- Moved to New Berne, N. C., December 31-January 6, 1863, and to Port Royal Harbor, S.C., January 27-February 5.
- At St. Helena Island, S.C., till February 27.
- At Beaufort, S.C., till June, and at Hilton Head, S.C., till July 28.
- Moved to Philadelphia and mustered out August 7, 1863.

== Commanders ==
- Colonel John Nyce
- Lieutenant Colonel Edward T. Hess
- Major Joseph B. Roberts

== Casualties ==
The 174th would lose 13 men by disease during its service

== See also ==
- List of Pennsylvania Civil War regiments
- Pennsylvania in the Civil War
