= 3rd Pennsylvania Infantry Regiment =

Union Army infantry regiment

3rd Pennsylvania Volunteer Infantry
- Pennsylvania flag
- Active: April 20 – July 29, 1861
- Country: United States
- Allegiance: Union
- Branch: United States Army; Union Army
- Type: Infantry
- Engagements: American Civil War

The 3rd Pennsylvania Infantry was an infantry regiment in the Union Army during the American Civil War that served for three months at the beginning of the war.

== History ==
The 3rd Pennsylvania was composed of independent volunteer companies, existing prior to the breaking out of the war, that responded to Governor Andrew Curtin of Pennsylvania issued a proclamation asking for 13,000 able-bodied men to volunteer to help preserve the Union. It drew these companies from Blair, Cambria and Allegheny counties and was mustered in for three months' service, April 20, 1861, at Harrisburg. Company G arrived early on Thursday morning April 18, and was the first company to enter Camp Curtin. Company K arrived on the same day, and the two companies alone occupied the camp during the day and night. Other companies arrived on Friday and Saturday. The regiment was organized on Friday, April 20 under the command of Col. Francis P. Minier, of Hollidaysburg, Blair county.

The regiment was ordered from Camp Curtin, on Saturday evening and immediately started by the Northern Central railroad for Baltimore. Arriving at Cockeysville, MD, further advance by rail was found to be cut off, by reason of the destruction of the bridge at that point. Orders were received from Maj. Gen. Scott for the 3rd to remain, and not attempt to pass through Baltimore due to the political unrest. It camped near Cockeysville until Monday night, April 22, when it returned to York, PA and went into camp there. The regiment and its companies began daily drilling as the weather permitted.

The men enjoyed the hospitality of York citizens who voluntarily contributed food until the commissary department was fully organized. They remained near York until Monday, May 27. On that day, the regiment took the railroad to Chambersburg, PA, and went into camp at Camp Chambers, about three miles from the town. Assigned to Brig. Gen. George C. Wynkoop's 2nd Brigade, of Maj. Gen. William H. Keim's 2nd Division, it continued its regular drill, gaining marked proficiency.

On Friday, June 7, the 3rd took the railroad south to Hagerstown, MD and continued on foot the same day to Funkstown, MD, to defend against Maj. Gen. Joseph E. Johnston's Rebel forces at Harpers Ferry. Drill and camp duty continued for the next three weeks in this encampment.

On Monday, July 1, the 3rd marched to Williamsport, MD, and Tuesday, it crossed the Potomac. On Wednesday, it arrived at the Baltimore & Ohio's critical rail center at Martinsburg VA. The regiment camped to the north of the town. The logistics line from Williamsport to Martinsburg was run by wagon train. To protect this vital line, the 3rd regiment was detached from the 2nd Brigade, and sent back to Williamsport. It remained on duty there until Friday, July 26, when its enlistment expired. It departed for Hagerstown where it entrained for Harrisburg arriving the next day. On Monday, July 29, the 3rd Pennsylvania mustered out of service.

== See also ==
- List of Pennsylvania Civil War Units

== External resources ==
- "Pennsylvania in the Civil War." PA-Roots, retrieved online July 1, 2018.
- Registers of Pennsylvania Volunteers, 1861–1865, vol. 1: 1st–25th Regiments (3 months' service, April–May 1861). Harrisburg: Pennsylvania State Archives.
- Soldiers and Sailors Database. Washington, D.C.: U.S. National Park Service.
