= List of Pennsylvania units in the American Civil War =

This is a list of Civil War units from Pennsylvania.

== Infantry ==
=== Volunteer Infantry ===
There are gaps in the numbering of infantry regiments because Pennsylvania numbered all volunteer regiments, regardless of branch, in sequence depending on when the regiment was raised. For example, the 6th Cavalry was also numbered the 70th Volunteer Regiment since it was raised between the 69th Infantry and the 71st Infantry, so there is no 70th Infantry.

- 1st Regiment
- 2nd Regiment
- 3rd Regiment
- 4th Regiment
- 5th Regiment
- 6th Regiment
- 7th Regiment
- 8th Regiment
- 9th Regiment
- 10th Regiment
- 11th Regiment
- 12th Regiment
- 13th Regiment
- 14th Regiment
- 15th Regiment
- 16th Regiment
- 17th Regiment
- 18th Regiment
- 19th Regiment
- 20th Regiment
- 21st Regiment
- 22nd Regiment
- 23rd Regiment
- 24th Regiment
- 25th Regiment
- 26th Regiment
- 27th Regiment
- 28th Regiment
- 29th Regiment
- 30th through 44th Regiment – See Pennsylvania Reserves section below
- 43rd Pennsylvania Militia Infantry Regiment
- 45th Regiment
- 46th Regiment
- 47th Regiment
- 48th Regiment
- 49th Regiment
- 50th Regiment
- 51st Regiment
- 52nd Regiment
- 53rd Regiment
- 54th Regiment
- 55th Regiment
- 56th Regiment
- 57th Regiment
- 58th Regiment
- 61st Regiment
- 62nd Regiment
- 63rd Regiment
- 66th Regiment
- 67th Regiment
- 68th Regiment
- 69th Regiment (Originally 2nd California)
- 71st Regiment (Originally 1st California)
- 72nd Regiment (Originally 3rd California)
- 73rd Regiment
- 74th Regiment
- 75th Regiment
- 76th Regiment
- 77th Regiment
- 78th Regiment
- 79th Regiment
- 81st Regiment
- 82nd Regiment
- 83rd Regiment
- 84th Regiment
- 85th Regiment
- 86th Regiment - failed to complete organization
- 87th Regiment
- 88th Regiment
- 90th Regiment
- 91st Regiment
- 93rd Regiment
- 94th Regiment - Failed to complete organization
- 95th Regiment
- 96th Regiment
- 97th Regiment
- 98th Regiment
- 99th Regiment
- 100th Regiment
- 101st Regiment
- 102nd Regiment
- 103rd Regiment
- 104th Regiment
- 105th Regiment - The Wildcat Regiment
- 106th Regiment (Originally 5th California)
- 107th Regiment
- 109th Regiment
- 110th Regiment
- 111th Regiment
- 112th Regiment - See 2nd Heavy Artillery
- 113th Regiment - See 12th Cavalry
- 114th Regiment
- 115th Regiment

- 116th Regiment
- 118th Regiment
- 119th Regiment
- 120th Regiment - failed to complete organization
- 121st Regiment
- 122nd Regiment
- 123rd Regiment
- 124th Regiment
- 125th Regiment
- 126th Regiment
- 127th Regiment
- 128th Regiment
- 129th Regiment
- 130th Regiment
- 131st Regiment
- 132nd Regiment
- 133rd Regiment
- 134th Regiment
- 135th Regiment
- 136th Regiment
- 137th Regiment
- 138th Regiment
- 139th Regiment
- 140th Regiment
- 141st Regiment
- 142nd Regiment
- 143rd Regiment
- 144th Regiment - failed to complete organization
- 145th Regiment
- 146th Regiment - failed to complete organization
- 147th Regiment
- 148th Regiment
- 149th Regiment
- 150th Regiment
- 151st Regiment
- 152nd Regiment
- 153rd Regiment
- 154th Regiment
- 155th Regiment
- 156th Regiment - failed to complete organization
- 157th Regiment
- 158th Regiment
- 164th Regiment - failed to complete organization
- 165th Regiment
- 166th Regiment
- 167th Regiment
- 168th Regiment
- 169th Regiment
- 170th Regiment -failed to complete organization
- 171st Regiment
- 172nd Regiment
- 173rd Regiment
- 174th Regiment
- 175th Regiment
- 176th Regiment
- 177th Regiment
- 178th Regiment
- 179th Regiment
- 183rd Regiment
- 184th Regiment
- 186th Regiment
- 187th Regiment
- 188th Regiment
- 189th Regiment - failed to complete organization
- 190th Regiment
- 191st Regiment
- 192nd Regiment
- 193rd Regiment
- 194th Regiment
- 195th Regiment
- 196th Regiment
- 197th Regiment
- 198th Regiment
- 199th Regiment
- 200th Regiment
- 201st Regiment
- 202nd Regiment
- 203rd Regiment
- 205th Regiment
- 206th Regiment
- 207th Regiment
- 208th Regiment
- 209th Regiment
- 210th Regiment
- 211th Regiment
- 213th Regiment
- 214th Regiment
- 215th Regiment
- Erie Regiment

=== U.S. Colored Troops ===
- 3rd Regiment
- 6th Regiment
- 8th Regiment
- 24th Regiment
- 25th Regiment
- 32nd Regiment
- 41st Regiment
- 43rd Regiment
- 45th Regiment
- 127th Regiment

=== Pennsylvania Reserves ===
- 1st Reserves (30th Infantry)
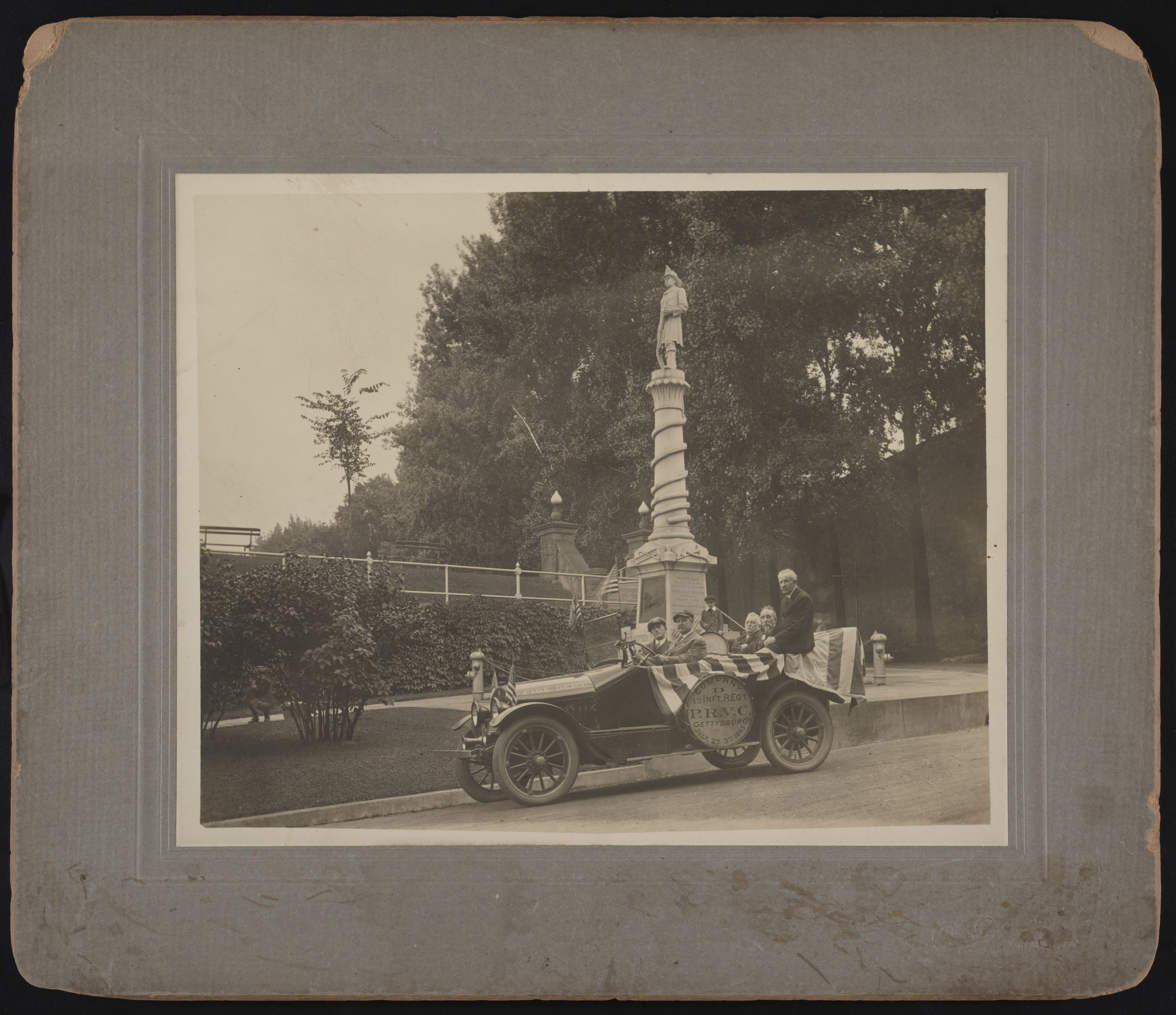
  Union veterans of 30th Pennsylvania Infantry Regiment, 1st Pennsylvania Reserve Corps, next to the Volunteer Firemen's Monument in Reading, Pennsylvania. They are riding in an American LaFrance chemical combination truck decorated with American flags. The inscription on the drum reads "Company D 1st Inft. Regt. P.R.V.C. Gettysburg July 2nd 3rd 1863."
- 2nd Reserves (31st Infantry)
- 3rd Reserves (32nd Infantry)
- 4th Reserves (33rd Infantry)
- 5th Reserves (34th Infantry)
- 6th Reserves (35th Infantry)
- 7th Reserves (36th Infantry)
- 8th Reserves (37th Infantry)
- 9th Reserves (38th Infantry)
- 10th Reserves (39th Infantry)
- 11th Reserves (40th Infantry)
- 12th Reserves (41st Infantry)
- 13th Reserves (42nd Infantry) - (1st Pennsylvania Rifles, "Bucktails")
- 14th Reserves (1st Light Artillery) - (43rd Volunteers)
- 15th Reserves (1st Cavalry) (44th Volunteers)

=== Others ===
- Philadelphia Brigade (California Brigade) (69th, 71st, 72nd and 106th Infantry Regiments)
- Southard's Independent Company, Colored Infantry

== Cavalry ==
- 1st Regiment -- See "15th Reserves (1st Pennsylvania Cavalry)"
- 2nd Regiment -- ("59th Volunteers")
- 3rd Regiment
- 4th Regiment
- 5th Regiment -- ("65th Volunteers")
- 6th Regiment -- ("70th Volunteers")
- 7th Regiment
- 8th Regiment -- ("89th Volunteers")
- 9th Regiment
- 10th Regiment
- 11th Regiment -- ("108th Volunteers")
- 12th Regiment
- 13th Regiment -- ("117th Volunteers")
- 14th Regiment -- ("159th Volunteers")
- 15th Regiment -- ("160th Volunteers")
- 16th Regiment -- ("161st Volunteers")
- 17th Regiment
- 18th Regiment -- ("163rd Volunteers")
- 19th Regiment -- ("180th Volunteers")
- 20th Regiment -- ("181st Volunteers")
- 21st Regiment
- 22nd Regiment
- 1st Provisional Regiment
- 2nd Provisional Regiment
- 3rd Provisional Regiment
- Anderson Troop

== Artillery ==
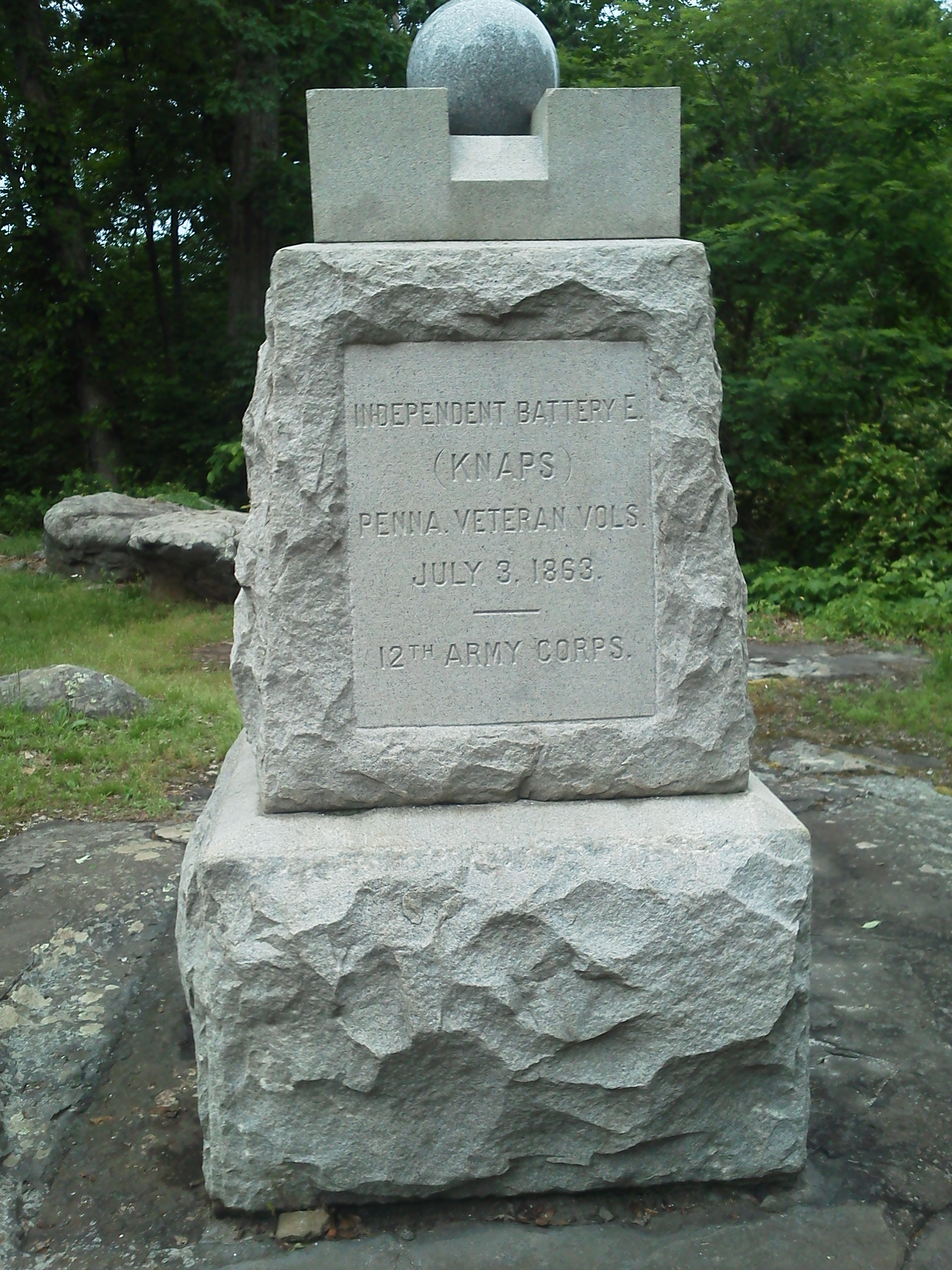
Knap's Battery monument.

=== Light Artillery ===
- 1st Regiment, Light Artillery (14th Reserves)
  - Battery A
  - Battery B
  - Battery C
  - Battery D
  - Battery F
  - Battery G
  - Battery H
  - Battery I

==== Independent Light Artillery Batteries ====
- Battery A ("Schaffer's Battery") - garrison duty 1861–1865
- Battery B (also known as Muehler's or Stevens' Battery, or 26th Indp't Battery, PA Artillery)
- Battery C ("Thompson's Battery")
- Battery D ("Durell's Battery")
- Battery E ("Knap's Battery")
- Battery F ("Hampton's Battery")
- Battery G ("Young's Battery") - garrison duty 1862–1865
- Battery H ("John Nevin's Battery") - garrison duty 1862–1865
- Battery I ("Robert J. Nevin's Battery") - garrison duty 1863–1865

=== Heavy Artillery ===
- 2nd Regiment
- 2nd Provisional Regiment
- 3rd Regiment
- 5th Regiment
- 6th Regiment

== See also ==
- List of American Civil War units by state
- United States Colored Troops
- Pennsylvania volunteer military units
