= 154th Pennsylvania Infantry Regiment =

- Also known as the 154th Pennsylvania
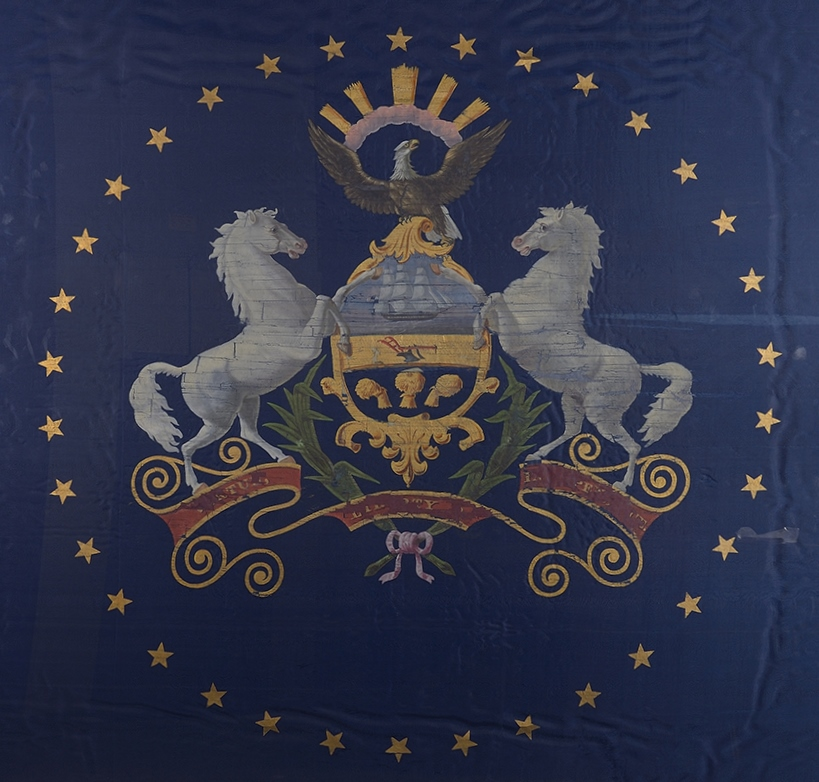
- Active: November 1, 1862, to January 21, 1863 - October 21, 1863
- Country: United States
- Allegiance: Union
- Branch: Union Army
- Type: Infantry
- Size: 165 (3 companies)
- Part of: None
- Garrison/HQ: Philadelphia
- Duties: Provost duty in Philadelphia

The 154th Pennsylvania Infantry Regiment, was an infantry regiment that served with the Union army during the American Civil War. Organized in Philadelphia for nine months' service, its only assignments were provost duty in the city of Philadelphia before they were mustered out.

== Service ==
The regiment was organized in December, 1862, but seven companies of this regiment were detached for special duty before the officers were commissioned, leaving only companies A, B and C remaining, consisting of 165 men, and they were mustered into service from November 1, 1862, to January 21, 1863 for nine months' service.

The regiment wasn't attached to any larger formations, nor participated in combat operations, and instead spent its entire service conducting provost duty in Philadelphia, where its primary responsibilities were:

- Maintaining order
- Enforcing military regulations
- Supporting local authorities

The regiment continued this assignment until September, 1863, when the companies of this regiment began to be mustered out, it started from Companies A and B mustered out in Philadelphia on September 29, 1863, and ended with Company C on October 21, 1863.

The regiment was mustered out of service on October 21, 1863.

== Detailed Service ==
=== 1863 ===
- Organized at Philadelphia October 29, 1862, to January 21, 1863.
- On provost duty at Philadelphia entire term. Mustered out September 29 to October 21, 1863.

== Casualties ==
The 154th lost 4 men to disease.

== Commanders ==
The regiment didn't receive any officers and was only left with the Assistant Surgeon.

- Assistant Surgeon George Huhn

== See also ==
- List of Pennsylvania Civil War regiments
- Pennsylvania in the Civil War
