= 200th Pennsylvania Infantry Regiment =

Union Army infantry regiment

200th Pennsylvania Volunteer Infantry
- Active: September 3, 1864 – May 30, 1865
- Country: United States of America
- Allegiance: Union
- Branch: Infantry
- Engagements: Siege of Petersburg; Appomattox Campaign; Battle of Fort Stedman; Third Battle of Petersburg; Battle of Appomattox Court House

The 200th Pennsylvania Volunteer Infantry was an infantry regiment that served in the Union Army during the American Civil War.

== Service ==
The 200th Pennsylvania Infantry was organized at Harrisburg, Pennsylvania on September 3, 1864 and mustered in under the command of Colonel Charles Worth Diven.

The regiment was attached to Engineer Brigade, Army of the Potomac, to October 1864. Provisional Brigade, Army of the James, to November 1864. Provisional Brigade, IX Corps, Army of the Potomac, to December 1864. 1st Brigade, 3rd Division, IX Corps, to May 1865.

The 200th Pennsylvania Infantry mustered out of service on May 20, 1865. Recruits whose term of service had not expired were transferred to the 51st Pennsylvania Infantry.

== Detailed service ==
Left Pennsylvania for Bermuda Hundred, Va., September 9. Duty near Dutch Gap, Va., with the Army of the James September 11 to November 28, 1864. Repulse of attack November 19. Transferred to the Army of the Potomac November 28. Siege of Petersburg December 1864 to April 1865. Dabney's Mills, Hatcher's Run, February 5–7, 1865. Fort Stedman March 25. Appomattox Campaign March 28-April 9. Assault on and capture of Petersburg April 2. Occupation of Petersburg April 3. Pursuit of Lee April 3–9. Appomattox Court House April 9. Surrender of Lee and his army. Duty at Nottaway Court House until May. Ordered to City Point, then to Alexandria and duty there until May 30.

== Casualties ==
The regiment lost a total of 54 men during service; 30 enlisted men killed or mortally wounded, 24 enlisted men died of disease.

== Commanders ==
- Colonel Charles Worth Diven
- Colonel William H. H. McCall

== See also ==
- List of Pennsylvania Civil War Units
- Pennsylvania in the Civil War
