= Pennsylvania military volunteer units =

More than 200 regiments of military volunteers were raised in Pennsylvania to serve in the United States Volunteers at various times, beginning during the War of 1812 and continuing until the passage of the Militia Act of 1903.

== Units ==
=== War of 1812 ===
Among the units raised for the War of 1812 were:

- Pittsburgh Blues. "This formation was extensively employed throughout the Old Northwest, distinguished itself at such notable engagements as Mississinewa, Fort Meigs, and Fort Stephenson, and won official commendation from General William Henry Harrison."
- Fenton's Volunteer Infantry Regiment, more commonly known as the "Pennsylvania Volunteers." Authorized by the Pennsylvania State Assembly on March 8, 1814, the regiment consisted of two battalions of five companies each. Hailing from Adams, Cumberland, and Franklin counties, the volunteers mustered at Carlisle under the command of Col. James Fenton. The unit joined others in fighting at 1814 Niagara campaign, particularly in the battles of Chippewa, Lundy's Lane, and Fort Erie.
- Washington Guards. Organized on March 22, 1813.
- Philadelphia Blues
- Independent Volunteers

Philadelphia continued to raise volunteer units throughout the war: "During the autumn of 1814, a large number of Volunteer Companies were organized in the City and County but did not take the field".

=== Post-1812 ===
- Washington Grays. Formed in 1822 by veterans of the Washington Guards who fought in the War of 1812, the Grays were first a light infantry unit, then an artillery unit. In 1879, the regiment became part of the new Pennsylvania National Guard.

=== Civil War ===
More than 200 volunteer regiments were raised in Pennsylvania for the Civil War.

== See also ==
- List of Pennsylvania Civil War units#Volunteer Infantry
