= Battery H, 1st Pennsylvania Light Artillery =

Light artillery battery in Civil War

- Active: 5 Aug. 1861 – 27 June 1865
- Country: United States
- Allegiance: (United States) Union; Pennsylvania
- Branch: Union Army
- Type: Field Artillery
- Size: Artillery Battery
- Equipment: 10-lb Parrott Rifle, M1857 12-lb Napoleon
- Engagements: American Civil War; Siege of Yorktown (1862); Battle of Williamsburg (1862); Battle of Seven Pines (1862); Seven Days Battles (1862); Battle of Glendale (1862); Battle of Malvern Hill (1862)

Battery H, 1st Pennsylvania Light Artillery was a light artillery battery that served in the Union Army as part of the Pennsylvania Reserves infantry division during the American Civil War.

== Service ==
The battery was organized at Philadelphia, Pennsylvania and mustered in for a three-year enlistment on August 5, 1861 under the command of Captain James Brady.

The battery was attached to Buell's Division, Army of the Potomac, October 1861 to March 1862. Artillery, 1st Division, IV Corps, Army of the Potomac, to July 1862. Reserve Artillery, IV Corps, Yorktown, VA, to June 1863. Camp Barry, Defenses of Washington, D.C., XXII Corps, to May 1864. 1st Brigade, DeRussy's Division, XXII Corps, to June 1865.

On April 3, 1865, upon news of Richmond, Virginia, being captured by the Union Army, Battery H started firing one hundred guns in celebration at Camp Barry.

The battery mustered out of service June 27, 1865.

== Detailed service ==
Duty in the defenses of Washington, D.C., until March, 1862. Advance on Manassas, Va., March 10–15. Ordered to the Virginia Peninsula. Siege of Yorktown April 5-May 4. Battle of Williamsburg May 5. Battle of Fair Oaks (Seven Pines) May 31-June 1. Seven days before Richmond June 25-July 1. Bottom's Bridge June 28–29. Glendale June 30. Malvern Hill July 1. At Harrison's Landing until August 16. Moved to Yorktown, Va., and duty there until June, 1863. Ordered to Washington, D.C., arriving July 1, and march to Gettysburg July 1–4. Return to Washington, and duty at Camp Barry until May, 1864. Garrison duty at Fort Whipple until December, and at Fort Marcy until February, 1865. Outpost duty at Edward's Ferry, Md., until June. Mustered out June 27, 1865.

== Commanders ==
- Captain James Brady - promoted to Major, July 19, 1862
- Captain Andrew R. Fagan - promoted to 1st Lieut., March 12, 1862; to Captain, August 1, 1862; dismissed May 1, 1865
- Captain Lord B. Richards - promoted to 2nd Lt., May 25, 1864; to 1st Lt., September 19, 1864; to Captain, June 5, 1865; mustered out with Battery, June 27, 1865

== Losses ==
Battery H sustained losses of one officer and one enlisted man killed or mortally wounded in action, while 18 enlisted men died of disease; there were 20 fatalities.

== See also ==
- List of Pennsylvania Civil War Units
- Pennsylvania in the Civil War
