= 186th Pennsylvania Infantry Regiment =

- Also known as the 186th Pennsylvania or the 186th Pennsylvania Volunteers
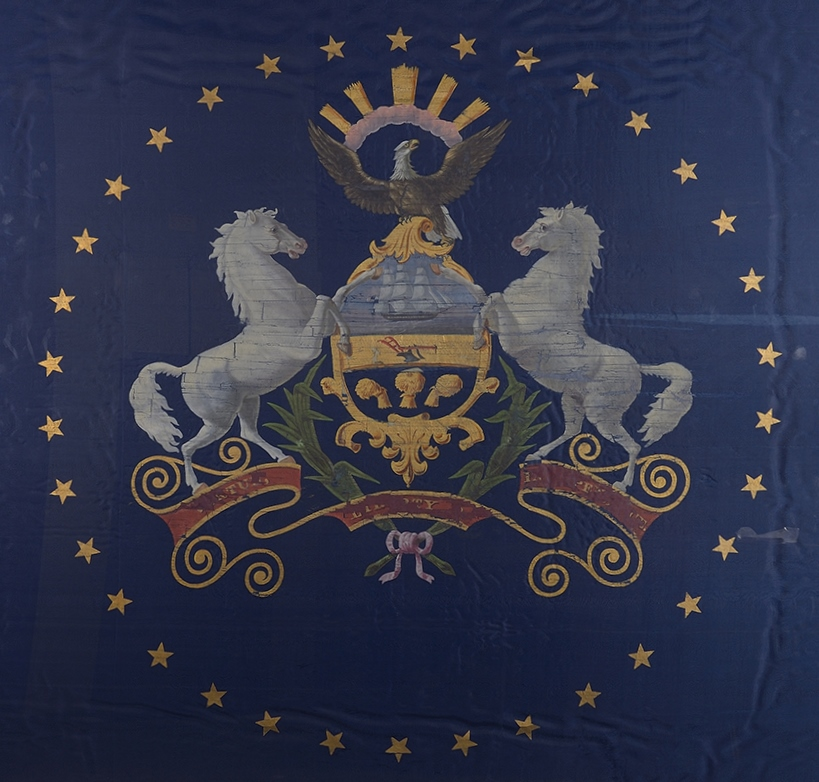
- Active: January 29 to May 31, 1864 - August 15, 1865.
- Country: United States
- Allegiance: Union
- Branch: Union Army
- Type: Infantry
- Role: Provost duties
- Size: 1,079
- Garrison/HQ: Philadelphia

The 186th Pennsylvania Infantry Regiment, also known as the 186th Pennsylvania Volunteer Infantry Regiment , was an infantry regiment that served in the Union army during the American Civil War. Recruited from Philadelphia, and served in the Department of the East, the regiment spent its service conducting duty on Philadelphia and Fort Mifflin until they were mustered out.

== Organization ==
The regiment was recruited in Philadelphia and was mustered into service from January 29 to May 31, 1864, for three years' service, under the command of Colonel Henry A. Frink, who had previously served as a Major and Lieutenant Colonel of the 11th Pennsylvania. Upon taking command of the regiment, He was appointed to be the Provost marshal of Philadelphia.

== Service ==
After being mustered into service, the 1,079-strong regiment conduct provost duty in Philadelphia, its primary responsibilities included:

- Maintaining civil order
- guarding military installations in Philadelphia (notably Fort Mifflin)
- Overseeing prisoners and deserters

On may 6, 1864, two companies were assigned to serve garrison duty for a draft rendezvous at Camp Cadwallader in Philadelphia. while the unit was primarily stationed in Philadelphia, several companies were temporarily deployed outside the city. By the summer of 1864, four companies were stationed in Wilmington, Delaware. On July 10, 1864, Major General Lew Wallace requested that four companies of the 186th be returned to Philadelphia.

On May 9, 1865, The Department of the Susquehanna was directed by Major General Hancock to deploy a company from either the 186th or the 187th Pennsylvania Infantry to Greencastle, McConnellsburg and Bedford, Pennsylvania, to prevent border incursions by Confederate guerillas and horse thieves. Because of its assignments, the 186th wasn't attached to any field army or corps, and would continue its provost duties until August, 1865.

The regiment was mustered out of service in Philadelphia, on August 15, 1865.

== Detailed service ==
=== 1864-1865 ===
- Organized at Philadelphia January 29 to May 31, 1864
- Duty at Fort Miflin and on provost duty at Philadelphia entire term
- Mustered out August 15, 1865

== Casualties ==
The regiment lost 17 by disease.

== Commanders ==
- Colonel Henry A. Frink (Promoted to Brevet Brigadier General on 4 October 1865)

== See also ==
- List of Pennsylvania Civil War regiments
- Pennsylvania in the Civil War
