= Independent Battery E, Pennsylvania Light Artillery =

- Active: 21 Sept. 1861 – 13 June 1865
- Country: United States
- Allegiance: (United States) Union; Pennsylvania
- Branch: Union Army
- Type: Field Artillery
- Size: Artillery Battery
- Equipment: 6 10-pounder Parrott rifles (1862)
- Engagements: American Civil War; Battle of Cedar Mountain (1862); Battle of Antietam (1862); Battle of Chancellorsville (1863); Battle of Gettysburg (1863); Battle of Wauhatchie (1863); Battle of Lookout Mountain (1863); Battle of Missionary Ridge (1863); Battle of Ringgold Gap (1863); Atlanta campaign (1864); Battle of Peachtree Creek (1864); Sherman's March to the Sea (1864); Battle of Averasborough (1865); Battle of Bentonville (1865)

Commanders
- Notable commanders: Joseph M. Knap

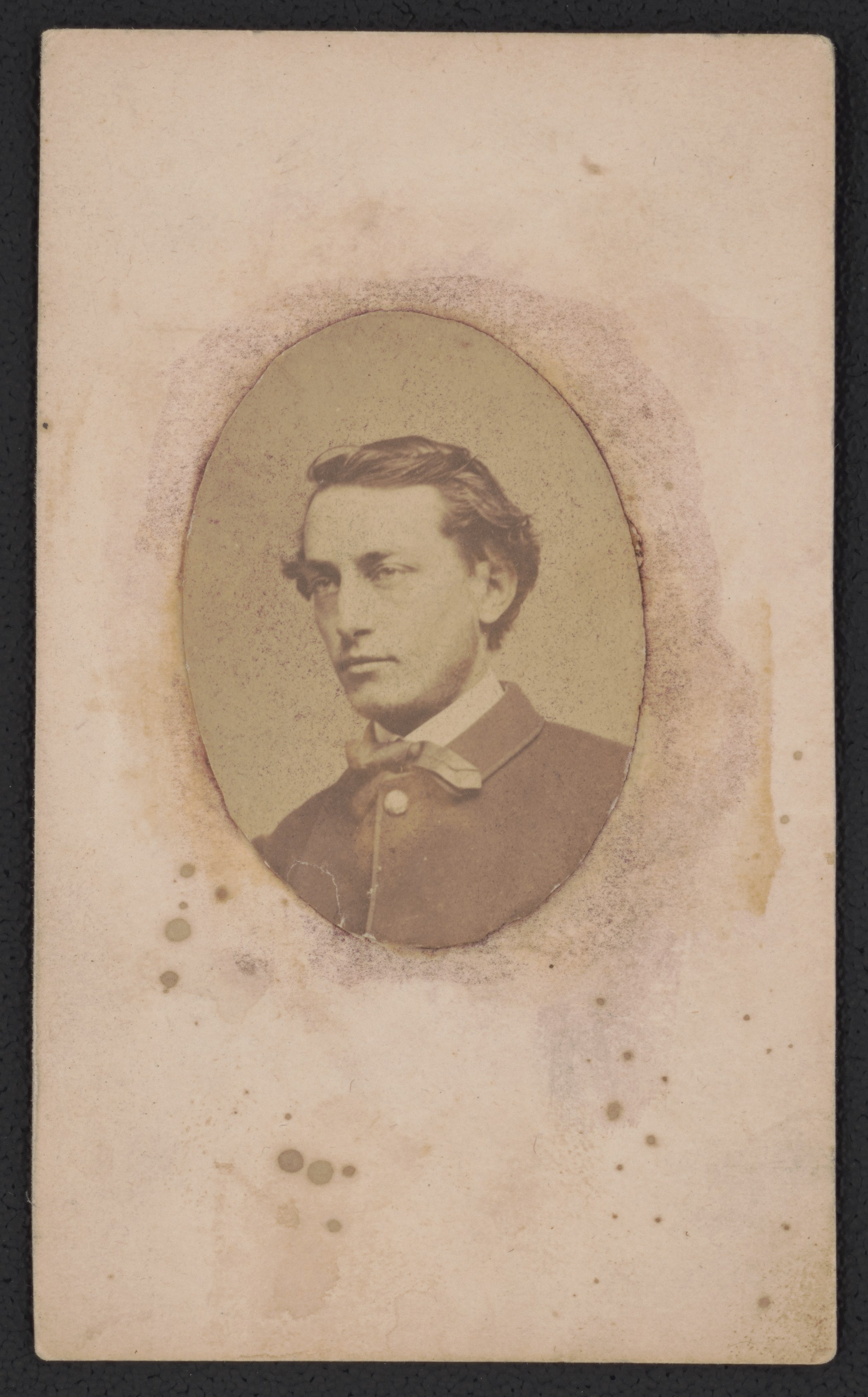
Major Joseph M. Knap of Independent Battery E, Pennsylvania Light Artillery (Knap's Light Artillery). From the Liljenquist Family Collection of Civil War Photographs, Prints and Photographs Division, Library of Congress

Independent Battery E, Pennsylvania Light Artillery, was an artillery battery that served in the Union Army during the American Civil War. The unit organized in September 1861 from the elements of two infantry regiments and served until 14 June 1865. The battery participated in the battles of Cedar Mountain and Antietam in 1862 and Chancellorsville and Gettysburg in 1863. That fall, Battery E transferred to the Western theater where it fought in the battles of Wauhatchie, Lookout Mountain, Missionary Ridge, and Ringgold Gap. The years 1864–65 saw the unit take part in the Atlanta campaign, Sherman's March to the Sea, and the battles of Averasborough and Bentonville. Battery E marched in the Grand Review of the Armies before being mustered out.

== Service ==
Organized at Point of Rocks, Md., from a Company formed for 63rd Pennsylvania and surplus men of the 28th Pennsylvania Infantry September, 1861. Attached to W. F. Smith's Division, Army of the Potomac, to November, 1861. Banks' Division, Army of the Potomac, to March, 1862. Geary's Separate Brigade, Banks' 5th Army Corps, to April, 1862. Geary's Separate Brigade, Dept. of the Shenandoah, to May, 1862. Geary's Separate Brigade, Dept. of the Rappahannock, to June, 1862. Artillery, 2nd Corps, Army of Virginia, to September, 1862. Artillery, 2nd Division, 12th Army Corps, Army of the Potomac, to May, 1863. Artillery Brigade, 12th Army Corps, to December, 1863. Artillery, 2nd Division, 12th Corps, Army of the Cumberland, to April, 1864. Artillery, 2nd Division, 20th Army Corps, to July, 1864. Artillery Brigade, 20th Army Corps, to June, 1865.

== History ==
SERVICE.--Camp at East Capital Hill, Defenses of Washington, until November 24, 1861. Moved to Point of Rocks November 24. Duty there and near Harper's Ferry until February 28, 1862. Action at Point of Rocks December 19. Occupation of Loudon Heights February 28. Operations on line of Manassas Gap Railroad March 1–April 14. Capture of Lovettsville March 1. March to Wheetland and Leesburg March 7–8. Capture of Leesburg March 8. Advance to Snickersville March 12. Upperville March 14. Ashby's Gap March 15. Middleburg March 27. Operations about Middleburg and White Plains March 27–28. Salem April 1. Thoroughfare Gap April 2. Piedmont April 14. Guarding Railroad at Salem until May 23. Front Royal May 23. Retreat to Manassas May 24–25. Guard Railroad and operations in the Valley until August. Reconnaissance to Orange and Culpeper Court House July 12–17. Battle of Cedar Mountain August 9. Pope's Campaign in Northern Virginia August 16–September 2. Rappahannock Bridge August 21. Sulphur Springs August 23–25. Maryland Campaign September 2–23. Battle of Antietam September 16–17. Moved to Harper's Ferry September 19–23. Duty at Sandy Hook until December. Reconnaissance to Rippon November 9. Reconnaissance to Winchester December 2–6. Berryville December 2. Winchester December 4. March to Fairfax Station December 9–17, and duty there until January 20, 1863. "Mud March" January 20–24. At Aquia Creek until April 27. Chancellorsville Campaign April 27–May 6. Battle of Chancellorsville May 1–5. Gettysburg (Pa.) Campaign June 11–July 24. Battle of Gettysburg July 1–3. Movement to Bridgeport, Ala., September 24–October 3. Wauhatchie, Tenn., October 28–29. Battles of Chattanooga November 23–25; Lookout Mountain November 23–24; Mission Ridge November 25; Ringgold Gap, Taylor's Ridge, November 27. Reenlisted January, 1864, and on furlough January and February. Expedition down Tennessee River to Triana April 12–16. Atlanta (Ga.) Campaign May to September. Demonstration on Rocky Faced Ridge May 8–11. Dug Gap or Mill Springs May 8. Battle of Resaca May 14–15. Near Cassville May 19. New Hope Church May 25. Operations on line of Pumpkin Vine Creek and battles about Dallas, New Hope Church and Allatoona Hills May 26–June 5. Operations about Marietta and against Kenesaw Mountain June 10–July 2. Pine Mountain June 11–14. Gilgal or Golgotha Church June 15. Lost Mountain June 15–17. Muddy Creek June 17. Noyes Creek June 19. Kolb's Farm June 22. Assault on Kenesaw June 27. Ruff's Station or Smyrna Camp Ground July 4. Chattahoochie River July 5–17. Peach Tree Creek July 19–20. Siege of Atlanta July 22–August 25. Operations at Chattahoochie River Bridge August 26–September 2. Occupation of Atlanta September 2–November 15. Near Atlanta November 9. March to the sea November 15–December 10. Siege of Savannah December 10–21. Campaign of the Carolinas January to April, 1865. Averysboro, N. C., March 16. Battle of Bentonville March 19–21. Occupation of Goldsboro March 24. Advance on Raleigh April 9–13. Neuse River April 10. Occupation of Raleigh April 14. Bennett's' House April 26. Surrender of Johnston and his army. March to Washington, D.C., via Richmond. Va., April 29–May 20. Grand Review May 24. Mustered out at Pittsburg June 14, 1865.

== Losses ==
Battery lost during service 2 Officers and 12 Enlisted men killed and mortally wounded and 11 Enlisted men by disease. Total 25.

== See also ==
- List of Pennsylvania Civil War units
