= Ignatz Gresser =

American soldier

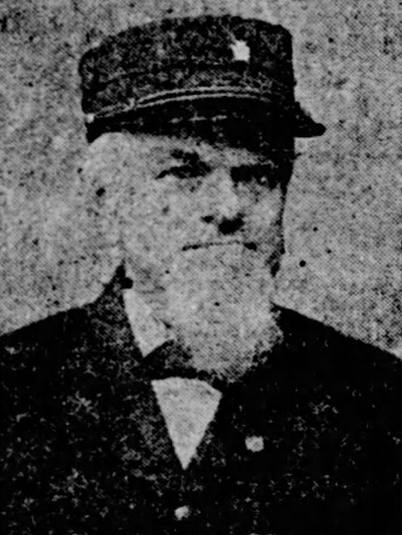
- Ignatz Gresser
- Born: August 15, 1835; Germany
- Died: August 1, 1919 (aged 83); Allentown, Pennsylvania, U.S.
- Burial place: Union-West End Cemetery, Allentown
- Military career
- Allegiance: United States of America
- Branch: United States Army; Union Army
- Rank: Corporal
- Units: Company D, 128th Pennsylvania Infantry Regiment
- Conflicts: American Civil War
- Awards: Medal of Honor

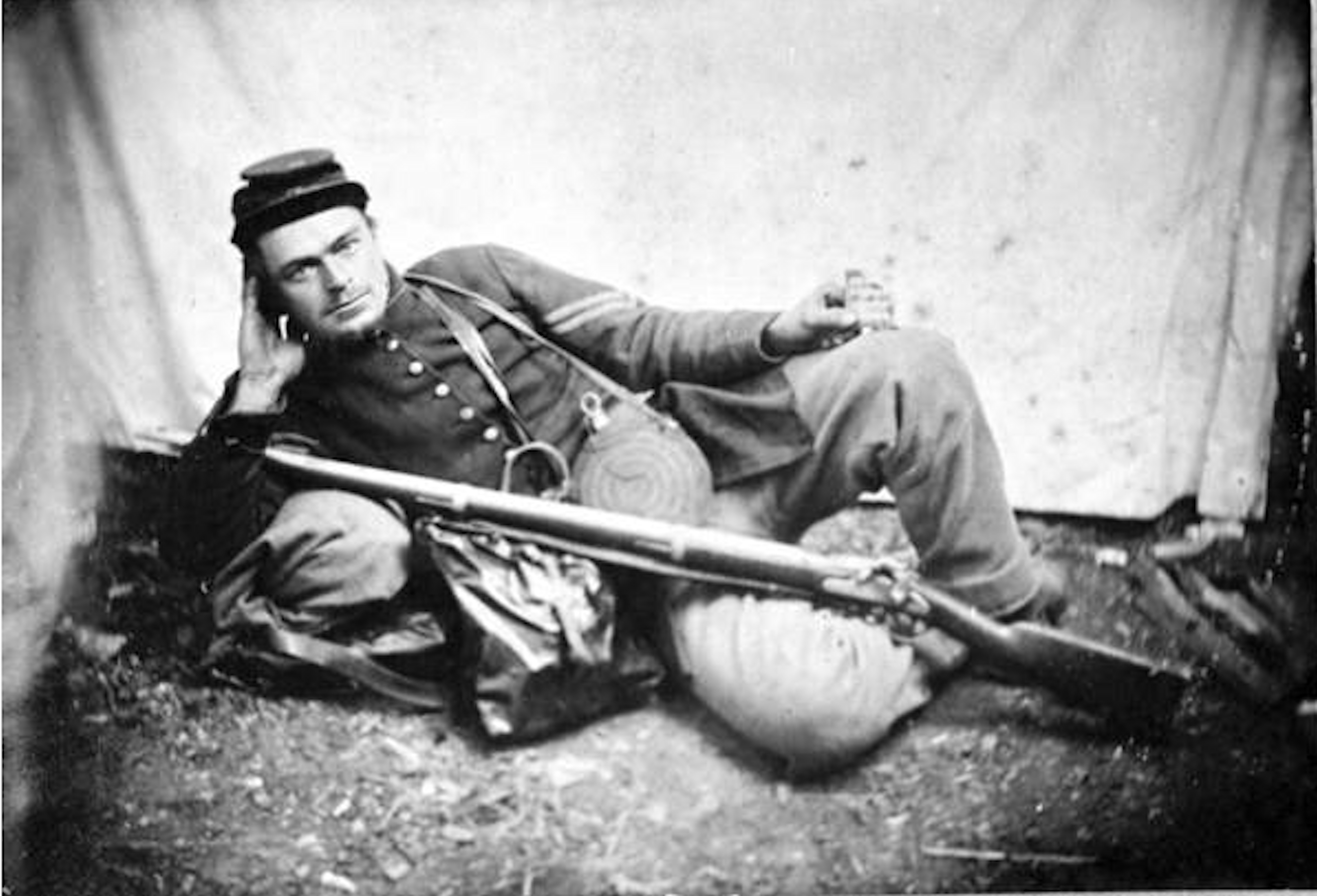
Private Ignatz Gresser in 1862

Ignatz Gresser (August 15, 1835 – August 1, 1919) was an American soldier and member of the 128th Pennsylvania Infantry Regiment who fought in the American Civil War and was awarded the Medal of Honor for carrying a wounded Union soldier from the field of battle at Antietam.

Gresser was born in Germany and emigrated to the United States in 1851 at the age of 15. He was a cobbler before and after the war. The soldier he saved was William Henry Sowden, who would go on to serve in the U.S. House of Representatives.

Ignatz Gresser died in Allentown, Pennsylvania, on August 1, 1919, and was buried in West End cemetery in Allentown, where a statue is erected in his honor.

== Medal of Honor citation ==
Rank and organization. Corporal, Company D, 128th Pennsylvania Infantry Regiment. Place and date: At Antietam, Maryland, September 17, 1862. Entered service at: Lehigh County, Pennsylvania. Birth: Germany. Date of issue: December 12, 1895.

Citation

While exposed to the fire of the enemy, carried from the field a wounded comrade.
