= Independent Battery B, Pennsylvania Light Artillery =

Light artillery battery of the Union Army

Independent Battery "B", Pennsylvania Light Artillery
- Active: August 1861 to October 12, 1865
- Country: United States
- Allegiance: (United States) Union; Pennsylvania
- Branch: Artillery
- Engagements: American Civil War; Battle of Shiloh (1862); Siege of Corinth (1862); Battle of Perryville (1862); Battle of Stones River (1862–63); Tullahoma Campaign (1863); Battle of Chickamauga (1863); Siege of Chattanooga (1863); Battle of Lookout Mountain (1863); Battle of Missionary Ridge (1863); Atlanta campaign (1864); Battle of Resaca (1864); Battle of Kennesaw Mtn. (1864); Siege of Atlanta (1864); Battle of Jonesboro (1864); Battle of Spring Hill (1864); Second Battle of Franklin (1864); Battle of Nashville (1864)

Independent Battery "B", Pennsylvania Volunteers was a light artillery battery that served in the Union Army during the American Civil War. The unit was also referenced as the Twenty-sixth Independent Battery, Pennsylvania Artillery, and commonly as "Muehler's Battery," or "Stevens' Battery," after its first two commanders.

== Service ==
The order for recruiting the Pennsylvania Seventy-seventh Regiment, provided for eight companies of infantry, and one of artillery. The artillery unit was recruited in Franklin County, in August 1861, by Captain Peter B. Housum; but not having the required strength, it was consolidated with one recruited for similar service in Erie County, by Captain Charles F. Muehler, and was mustered into service for a three-year enlistment at Pittsburgh, on October 11, 1861. Capt. Muehler was given command of the unit, until his resignation on November 16, 1862; he was replaced by Captain Alanson Stevens, on January 5, 1863. Stevens was the nephew, and former ward, of congressman Thaddeus Stevens.

The battery was attached to Negley's Brigade, McCook's Command, Army of the Ohio, to December 1861. Artillery, 2nd Division, Army of the Ohio, to June 1862. Artillery, 5th Division, Army of the Ohio, to September 1862. Artillery, 5th Division, II Corps, Army of the Ohio, to November 1862. Artillery, 3rd Division, Left Wing, XIV Corps, Army of the Cumberland, to January 1863. Artillery, 3rd Division, XXI Corps, Army of the Cumberland, to October 1863. Artillery, 3rd Division, IV Corps, Army of the Cumberland, to April 1864. Artillery, 1st Division, 4th Corps, to July 1864. Artillery Brigade, IV Corps, to August 1865. Department of Texas to October 1865.

Battery "B", Pennsylvania Light Artillery mustered out of service on October 12, 1865.

== Detailed service ==
Monument to Independent Battery 'B', Pa. Volunteers, at Chickamauga Battlefield Military Park, circa 1897.

Moved down the Ohio River with the 77th Pennsylvania, in November 1861, to Louisville, Ky.; then to General McCook's Headquarters at Camp Nevin, Kentucky, for instruction and drill. Camp at Nolin River, Ky., until February 1862. March to Bowling Green, Ky.; then to Nashville, Tenn., February 14-March 3. March to Savannah, Tenn., March 16-April 6. Battle of Shiloh, April 6–7 (reserve). Advance on and Siege of Corinth, Miss., April 29-May 30. Pursuit to Booneville May 31-June 6. Buell's Campaign in northern Alabama and middle Tennessee June to August. March to Louisville, Ky., in pursuit of Bragg, August 20-September 26. Pursuit of Bragg into Kentucky October 1–22. Battle of Perryville, Ky., October 8. Logan's Cross Roads October 18. March to Nashville, Tenn., October 22-November 6 and duty there until December 26. Advance on Murfreesboro December 26–30. Battle of Stones River December 30–31, 1862 and January 1–3, 1863. Duty at Murfreesboro until June. Tullahoma Campaign June 23-July 7. Occupation of middle Tennessee until August 16. Passage of Cumberland Mountains and Tennessee River, and Chickamauga Campaign, August 16-September 22. Battle of Chickamauga September 19–20. Siege of Chattanooga September 24-October 27. Battles of Chattanooga November 23–25; Missionary Ridge November 24–25; Atlanta Campaign May to September 1864. Demonstration on Rocky Faced Ridge May 8–11. Buzzard's Roost Gap May 8–9. Demonstration on Dalton May 9–13. Battle of Resaca May 14–15. Near Kingston May 18–19. Near Cassville May 19. Kingston May 21. Cassville May 24. New Hope Church May 25. Operations on line of Pumpkin Vine Creek and battles about Dallas, New Hope Church, and Allatoona Hills, May 26-June 5. Operations about Marietta and against Kennesaw Mountain June 10-July 2. Pine Hill June 11–14. Lost Mountain June 15–17. Assault on Kennesaw June 27. Ruff's Station, or Smyrna Camp Ground, July 4. Chattahoochee River July 5–17. Peachtree Creek July 19–20. Siege of Atlanta July 22-August 25. Flank movement on Jonesboro August 25–30. Battle of Jonesboro August 31-September 1. Operations in northern Georgia and northern Alabama against Hood September 29-November 3. Nashville Campaign November–December. Spring Hill November 23 and November 29. Battle of Franklin November 30. Near Nashville December 6. Battle of Nashville December 15–16. Pursuit of Hood to the Tennessee River December 17–28. Moved to Huntsville, Ala., and duty there until March 1865. Operations in northern Georgia and eastern Tennessee January 31-April 24. Duty at Nashville, until June. Moved to New Orleans, then to Texas and duty there until October 1865. While in Texas the battery was part of a 50,000-man force garrisoned at the U.S.-Mexican border, placed as a deterrent to the French imperialist attempt to take over Mexico.

== Casualties ==
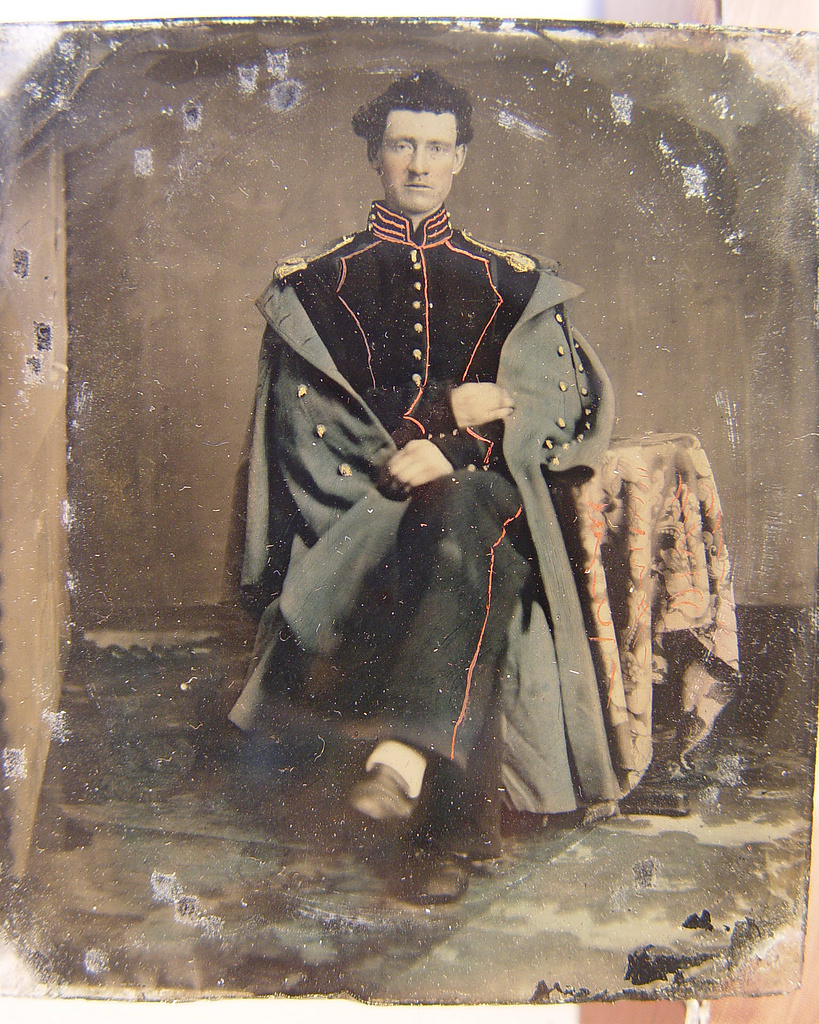
Private William P. Haberlin, of Pa. Independent Battery "B", killed in action on Dec. 16, 1864, at Nashville, Tennessee. Handwritten poem found with photograph reads: "Now to the field again I'll go, for the union to defend, until Jeff Davis is made to know, his kingdom is about to end. And now if I would not live, to hear f[r]eemen shout for joy, this miniature to you I give, in memory of a soldier boy. William P. Haberlin." (Library of Congress collection)

The battery lost a total of 35 men during service: 2 officers (Stevens & McDowell) and 8 enlisted men killed or mortally wounded (Cuddy, Feirstine, Haberlin, Hasenflugh, Heller, Reins, Schlof); 25 enlisted men died of disease.

== Commanders ==
- Captain Charles F. Muehler (also appears as "Mueller") - resigned commission on November 16, 1862
- Captain Alanson Joshua Stevens - commanded at the battles of Perryville and Stones River as a lieutenant; killed in action, September 20, 1863, battle of Chickamauga
- Captain Samuel M. McDowell - commanded at the battle of Chickamauga as a lieutenant; killed in action, June 27, 1864, battle of Kennesaw Mountain
- Captain Jacob Ziegler - commanded at the battle of Nashville

== See also ==
- List of Pennsylvania Civil War Units
- Pennsylvania in the Civil War
