= 173rd Pennsylvania Infantry Regiment =

173rd Pennsylvania Volunteer Infantry Regiment
- Also known as the 173rd Pennsylvania or 173rd Pennsylvania Volunteers
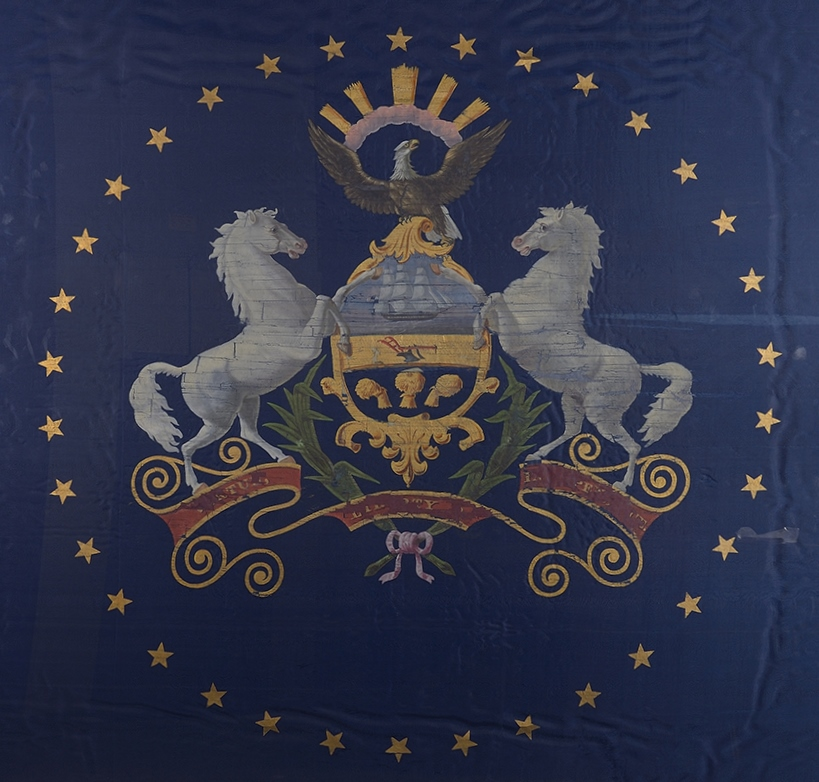
- State Flag of Pennsylvania (Circa 1863)
- Active: October and November, 1862 – August 18, 1863
- Country: United States
- Allegiance: Union
- Branch: Union Army
- Type: Union Army
- Part of: VII Corps (1862); XI Corps (1863)
- Engagements: Guard, outpost and provost duty at Norfolk, Virginia. Pursuit of Lee July 12–24. Guard duty on Orange & Alexandria Railroad.

Commanders
- Notable commanders: Colonel Daniel Nagle; Lieutenant Colonel Zaccur P. Boyer; Major Grant Weidman

The 173rd Pennsylvania Volunteer Infantry Regiment, also known as the 173rd Pennsylvania Infantry Regiment, was an infantry regiment that served with the Union Army during the American Civil War. Composed of drafted men serving a nine-year enlistment period, the regiment spent its service conducting guard, outpost, and provost duty at various points in their service before being mustered out.

== Organization ==
When Pennsylvania did not meet President Lincoln's August 1862 request for 300,000 nine-month volunteers, the Commonwealth drafted (under the Federal Militia Act of 1862) fifteen regiments between mid-October and early December 1862, totaling 15,000 men. All fifteen regiments were mustered out of service by mid-August 1863. Few saw any combat action.

The regiment was organized at Camp Curtin in Harrisburg, Pennsylvania, from October to November, 1862, with 1,267 men.

The companies of the regiment were recruited from:

- Company A. - Schuylkill County
- Company B. - Lebanon County
- Company C. - Lebanon County
- Company D. - Schuylkill County
- Company E. - Perry County
- Company F. - Schuylkill County
- Company G. - Schuylkill County
- Company H. - Schuylkill County
- Company I. - Lebanon County
- Company K - Dauphin County

== Service ==
After being mustered into service, the regiment left the state for Washington D.C., where it was then moved to Suffolk, Virginia, and was scheduled to move to Fort Monroe. Still, it was changed to Norfolk, Virginia, where it was stationed at Camp Veile, performing guard and drill duties. During this period, the regiment was fractured into multiple detachments to guard key installations in the region.

In early May 1863, the regiment was ordered directly to Norfolk for provost duty until July 9. After the Battle of Gettysburg, the regiment, alongside the 177th Pennsylvania, moved to Washington, D.C. and then to Frederick, Maryland, reporting to General Meade, participating in the Pursuit of Robert E. Lee's Army of Northern Virginia after their defeat at the Battle of Gettysburg. The regiment was ordered to report to General Howard and would be attached to the 1st Brigade, 2nd Division of the XI Corps

Unaccustomed to long marches, the regiment would later perform guard duty on the Orange & Alexandria Railroad until August, when it was ordered back to Harrisburg, to be mustered out of Service on August 18, 1863. The regiment was assigned to larger formations during its service, as follows:

- District of Norfolk, Va., 7th Corps, Dept. of Virginia, to July, 1863.
- 1st Brigade, 2nd Division, 11th Army Corps, Army of the Potomac, to August, 1863.

== Detailed service ==
=== 1862 ===
- Organized at Harrisburg in October and November 1862.
- Left State for Washington, D.C., November 30;
- thence moved to Suffolk and Norfolk, Va.
- Attached to District of Norfolk, Va., 7th Corps, Dept. of Virginia, to July, 1863.
- Guard, outpost, and provost duty at Norfolk, Va., till July 1863.

=== 1863 ===
- Pursuit of Lee July 12–24.
- 1st Brigade, 2nd Division, 11th Army Corps, Army of the Potomac, to August, 1863.
- Guard duty on the Orange & Alexandria Railroad till August.
- Mustered out August 18, 1863

== Commanders ==
- Colonel Daniel Nagle
- Lieutenant Colonel Zaccur P. Boyer
- Major Grant Weidman

== Casualties ==
The regiment lost 19 men to disease during its entire service

== See also ==
- List of Pennsylvania Civil War regiments
- Pennsylvania in the Civil War
