= 172nd Pennsylvania Infantry Regiment =

- 172nd Pennsylvania regimental colors. Photo: Pennsylvania Capitol Preservation Committee
- Active: November 29, 1862 to August 1, 1863
- Country: United States
- Allegiance: Union
- Branch: Infantry
- Size: 1,332
- Engagements: Gettysburg Campaign

The 172nd Pennsylvania Infantry was an infantry regiment in the Union Army during the American Civil War.

== Formation ==
When Pennsylvania did not meet President Lincoln's August 1862 request for 300,000 nine-month volunteers, the Commonwealth drafted (under the Federal Militia Act of 1862) fifteen regiments between mid-October and early December 1862, totaling 15,000 men. All fifteen regiments were mustered out of service by mid-August 1863. Few saw any combat action.

The 172nd Pennsylvania Infantry was organized at Harrisburg, Pennsylvania (Camp Curtin). The regiment’s soldiers were selected principally from Snyder and Northumberland Counties, with detachments from Clearfield, Elk, McKean, Union, Montour, and Butler Counties. In all, 1,332 men were mustered into the regiment.

By company, most soldiers hailed from the following counties:

- Company A: Snyder, Northumberland, and Union
- Company B: Northumberland
- Company C: Snyder, Elk, Union, and Northumberland
- Company D: Northumberland
- Company E: York and Elk
- Company F: Clearfield, Montour, and Union
- Company G: Snyder and Union
- Company H: Northumberland, Montour, and Elk
- Company I: Snyder
- Company K: Northumberland

== Service ==
The regiment mustered in for nine months service between October 27 and November 29, 1862, under the command of Colonel Charles Kleckner.

The regiment was assigned to larger formations as follows:

- Garrison duty at Yorktown, Va. assigned to IV Corps, Department of Virginia, to April 1863
- Advance Brigade (West), IV Corps, Dept. of Virginia, to June 1863
- 3rd Brigade (Kleckner), 1st Division, IV Corps, to July 1863
- 1st Brigade (Tyndale), 3rd Division, XI Corps, Army of the Potomac, to August 1863.

On the day after their arrival at Yorktown in December 1862 with three other drafted regiments from Pennsylvania, Maj. Gen. Erasmus D. Keyes, IV Corps commander, wrote that he found the regiments to be “perfectly green” and that “none of them are in a condition to meet the enemy.” Thus he assigned the 172nd to the heavy guns at Yorktown and until April 1863 they remained unassigned to any brigade.

In June 1863, the men of the 172nd offered to re-enlist for six months at the end of their term of service. The War Department originally intended to accept their offer but upon learning that it was contingent upon serving in the Department of the Susquehanna in Pennsylvania, declined, and the regiment mustered out as scheduled on August 1, 1863.

== Detailed service ==
=== 1862 ===
- Moved to Washington, D.C., December 2.
- To Newport News. Va., December 4.
- To Yorktown, Va., December 12.
- Garrison duty at Yorktown, Va. assigned to IV Corps, Dept. of Virginia, December.

=== 1863 ===
- Assigned to Advance Brigade, IV Corps, Dept. of Virginia, April.
- Maj. Gen. John Dix’s Peninsula Campaign, assigned to 3rd Brigade, 1st Division, IV Corps, June 27-July 7.
- Ordered to Washington, D.C., July 9, moved to Frederick, Md., July 11.
- Joined Army of the Potomac at Hagerstown, Md., assigned to 1st Brigade, 3rd Division, XI Corps, July 14.
- Pursuit of Robert E. Lee's Army of Northern Virginia from Williamsport, Md.; crossed Potomac at Berlin and marched to Warrenton Junction, Va., July 19–25.
- Ordered to Harrisburg, Pa., and mustered out under Colonel Kleckner, August 1.

== Casualties ==
The regiment lost 13 enlisted men to disease. In addition to those who died, some soldiers were discharged from the regiment due to illness and other reasons and some deserted. The strength of the regiment was reported as 671 men on July 16, 1863, after they joined XI Corps.

== Commanders ==
The regiment was formed under Colonel Charles Kleckner, Lt. Colonel Thaddeus G. Bogle, and Major M. T. Heintzelman. On December 10, 1862, Lt. Colonel Bogle was discharged and replaced by Lt. Colonel James A. Johnson. The regiment mustered out on August 1, 1863, under Colonel Kleckner.

Before serving in the 172nd, Col. Kleckner served as a private in Company K of the 6th Pennsylvania Infantry (in 1861) and then as a first lieutenant in Company D of the 48th Pennsylvania Infantry (in 1861-62). Afterwards he served as a lieutenant colonel in the 184th Pennsylvania Infantry (in 1864-65). After the war, he was elected to the Pennsylvania House of Representatives as a Republican, in 1868 and 1869.

== See also ==
- List of Pennsylvania Civil War regiments
- Pennsylvania in the Civil War
