= 192nd Pennsylvania Infantry Regiment =

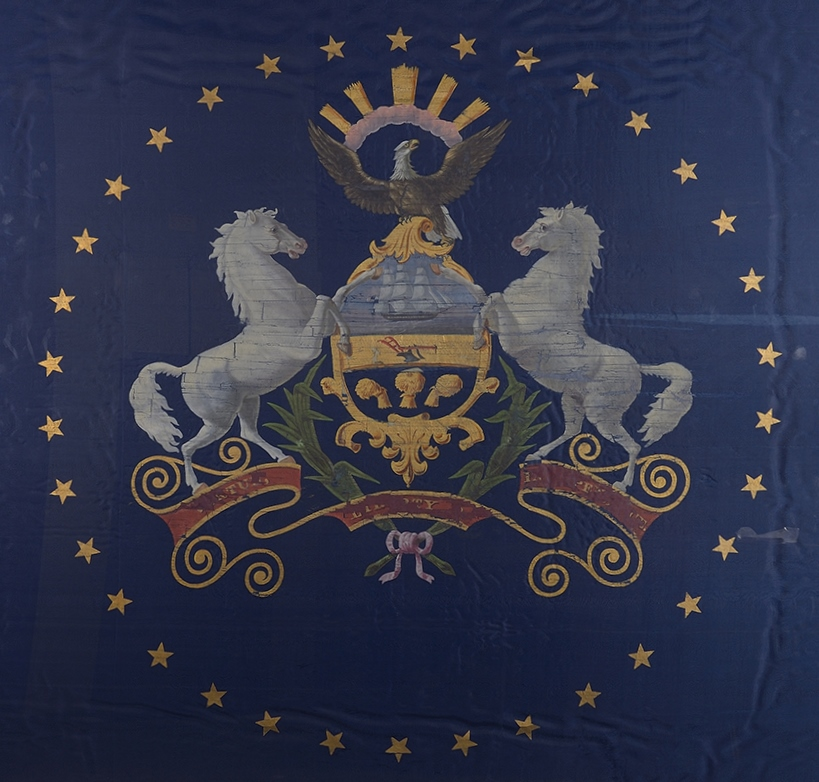
- State Flag of Pennsylvania, circa 1863.
- Active: July, 1864 - November 11, 1864 (100 days service); February, 1865 - August 24, 1865 (1 year service)
- Country: United States
- Allegiance: Union
- Branch: Union Army
- Type: Infantry
- Size: 1,500 (100 days service); 1,000 (1 years service)
- Part of: VIII Corps (1864); Army of the Shenandoah (1865); District of West Virginia, Middle Department (1865)
- Engagements: None

The 192nd Pennsylvania Infantry Regiment was an infantry regiment that served with the Union Army during the American Civil War. Organized in Philadelphia for 100 days' service, the's first assignment was being trained in heavy artillery at Fort McHenry, before being assigned to guard duty and forwarding supplies to the Union army, while a battalion of the regiment was detached and sent to West. The regiment was mustered out of service on November 11, 1864.

The regiment mustered into service again in February, 1865 for one years service, and spent its entire service stationed in Virginia before being mustered out of August 24, 1865.

== Organization ==
Before joining the 192nd Pennsylvania, a portion of the men previously served in the 20th Pennsylvania Militia Regiment in 1862 and in 1863. by Col. William B. Thomas. The 192nd Pennsylvania was organized in Philadelphia for 100 days' service, consisting of 14 companies. The regiment was mustered into service at Camp Cadwalader in July 1864.

== Service ==
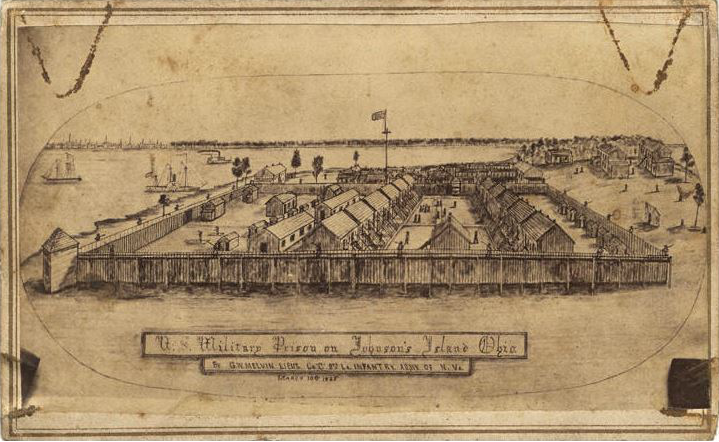
A drawing of Johnson's Island Prison.

=== Hundred days' service ===
The 1,500-strong regiment left Philadelphia on July 23 and was subsequently encamped 5 miles away from Baltimore, Maryland , until August 1. The regiment was ordered to Fort McHenry, where it performed guard duty and was also trained in heavy artillery, despite being previously trained in light infantry tactics by Col. William B. Thomas.

After two weeks of being stationed at Fort McHenry, they were relieved of their post there and proceeded via Harrisburg and Pittsburgh to Johnson's Island, an island on Lake Erie holding Confederate officers as prisoners. The regiment was stationed there for a few days, performing guard duty on the prisoners, before heading southward by rail to Gallipolis, Ohio. At Gallipolis, the regiment was assigned to guard and forward supplies for the Union army. Detachments of the regiment were also sent to guard the boats on the Ohio River, and detachments were also sent to break up bands of Confederate guerrillas.

On October 30, Companies A, B, F, D, L, and G under Major McClintock were detached and proceeded to Weston, West Virginia, and there, they served with General Benjamin F. Kelley until they were mustered out. On the night of October 21, Lieutenant William E. Tyndale of Company K was on his way to rejoin the remaining companies still stationed in Gallipolis, after six weeks of duty at Ironton, when he drowned on the Ohio River after being accidentally thrown from the transport he was on.

On October 31, once the regiment's enlistment period had expired, the battalion that remained at Gallipolis returned to Philadelphia, while the other battalion at Weston also returned to Philadelphia. The two battalions were mustered out of service on November 11, 1864.

=== 1 Year's service ===
Despite the regiment being mustered out of service, Company A under Captain William F. Johnston, re-enlisted for another 1 year, and in the spring of 1865, 9 new companies were raised, totaling over 1,000 men with 10 companies, and were immediately assigned to the 2nd Brigade, 3rd Division, Army of the Shenandoah. By April, it was assigned to the District of West Virginia of the Middle Department. The regiment spent its service stationed in the vicinity of Staunton and Lexington, Virginia, despite not facing Confederate resistance, due to the war having ended.

The regiment was mustered out of service on August 24, 1865.

== Organizational affiliations, detailed service, and casualties ==
During their Service, the regiment was attached to larger formations such as:

=== 1864 ===
- Attached to 2nd Separate Brigade, 8th Corps, Middle Department, July, 1864.

=== 1865 ===
- Attached to 2nd Brigade, 3rd Division, Army of the Shenandoah, to April, 1865.
- Sub-District of Harper's Ferry, District of West Virginia, Middle Department, to August, 1865.

=== 1864 ===
- Organized at Philadelphia for 100 days July, 1864.
- At Camp Cadwalader till July 23.
- Moved to Baltimore, Md., July 23.
- Attached to 2nd Separate Brigade, 8th Corps, Middle Department, July, 1864.
- Gallipolis, Ohio, Northern Department, to November.
- Duty at Baltimore, Md., till August 1 and at Fort McHenry till August 15.
- Moved to Johnson's Island, Lake Erie, August 15.
- Company "K," at Ironton, Ohio, August to November.
- Duty at Gallipolis, Ohio, September to November.
- Mustered out November 11, 1864.

=== 1865 ===
- Regiment reorganized for one year February, 1865.
- Duty in the Shenandoah Valley. Mustered out August 24, 1865.

=== Casualties ===
The regiment lost 16 men to disease during their service

== Commanders ==
=== 100 days' service ===
- Colonel William B. Thomas
- Lieutenant Colonel Benjamin L. Taylor
- Major C.W. McClintock
- Major Henry J. Snyder

=== One years' service ===
- Colonel William W. Stewart
- Lieutenant Colonel Thomas McLeester
- Major William F. Johnston

== See also ==
- List of Pennsylvania Civil War regiments
- Pennsylvania in the Civil War
