= 22nd Pennsylvania Infantry Regiment =

Union Army infantry regiment

22nd Pennsylvania Volunteer Infantry
- Pennsylvania flag
- Active: April 23, 1861 – July 31, 1861
- Country: United States
- Allegiance: Union
- Branch: United States Army; Union Army
- Type: Infantry
- Nickname: Philadelphia Light Guard

Commanders
- Colonel: Turner G. Morehead

The 22nd Pennsylvania Volunteer Infantry was a three-month infantry regiment that served in the Union Army during the American Civil War.

== Service ==
This regiment was organized at Philadelphia and mustered into federal service on May 1, 1861. This regiment was also a Philadelphia militia regiment and was recruited in that city. It was known as the Philadelphia Light Guard.

After mustering in, it went into camp near Philadelphia. In May the regiment was ordered to Baltimore and encamped at Locust Point. Later, it moved to Patterson's park and at Mount Clare. It performed guard and police duty in Baltimore until mustered out on August 7, at Philadelphia.

=== Organizational affiliation ===
Attached to the defenses of Baltimore in the Department of Annapolis commanded by Brigadier General Benjamin F. Butler (Note: A colorful and often controversial figure on the national stage and on the Massachusetts political scene, Butler was an American soldier, politician, lawyer, and businessman from Massachusetts. Born in New Hampshire and raised in Lowell, Massachusetts, Butler is best known as a political major general of the U. S. Army during the American Civil War and for his leadership role in the impeachment of U.S. President Andrew Johnson. He served five terms in the U.S. House of Representatives and running several campaigns for governor before his election to that office in 1882.) (until May 15) and then Major General George Cadwalader. (Note: A Philadelphia native from a prominent family, Cadwalader was an officer in the Pennsylvania militia and a general in the United States Army during the Mexican–American War and American Civil War. In 1834, a commander of the First Brigade, First Division of the Pennsylvania State Militia, he was criticized for his weak role in the Philadelphia anti-Catholic riots. Cadwalader refused to allow the militia to take action as rioters destroyed the Irish-Catholic neighborhood on Kensington in May 1844. When he did call out the militia five days after the violence began, his troops primarily stood as observers and did not actively try to suppress the riots. Cadwalader argued that he could not do so without express order from the governor. As a result, state law was changed several years later to permit emergency action without express approval from the governor. Two months later in July, during three days of rioting in Southwark, a largely Catholic neighborhood in South Philadelphia, Cadwalader ordered his troops to fire into the crowd of nativists trying to destroy St. Philip Neri Church, resulting in the deaths of twelve rioters and two militiamen, with many more injured. The ensuing concern over the use of the military against civilian populations and led directly to the creation of a much stronger and more professional police force in Philadelphia. He served in the Mexican-American War seeing action at Contreras, Churubusco, and Chapultepec, being brevetted major general in the Regular Army, September 13, 1847. When the Civil War broke out, Cadwalader immediately volunteered and was appointed major general of Pennsylvania Volunteers by Governor Andrew Curtin in April 1861. As military commander in Maryland, where Union communications were being threatened by local Confederate sympathizers, he was involved in the famous Ex parte Merryman habeas corpus case. Commissioned major general in the United States Volunteers, he Cadwalader commanded the post at Corinth, Mississippi, returning to command the post at Philadelphia and successively the District of Philadelphia, the District of the Brandywine, and the District of the Susquehanna before resigning in July 1865.)

=== List of battles ===
The regiment participated in no battles during its service.

=== Detailed service ===
- Left Philadelphia for Baltimore, MD., May 17
- Duty near Fort McHenry, Locust Point, Patterson's Park and Mt. Clair till August
- Mustered out in Philadelphia, August 7, 1861

== Casualties ==
The regiment suffered no losses during its service.

== Regimental staff ==
- Colonel Turner G. Morehead
- Lieutenant-Colonel William L. Curry
- Major John McManus

== See also ==
- List of Pennsylvania Civil War Units
- Pennsylvania in the Civil War
