= Southard's Independent Company =

Colored unit of the Union Army

Company "A" (Southard's Independent Company), Pennsylvania (Colored) Infantry was a United States Colored Troops unit briefly formed during the Civil War in the Union Army. The unit was organized at Camp William Penn, Pennsylvania on July 28, 1864 It was named for its commander, Captain Converse Southard. The unit was disbanded November 14, 1864 at Philadelphia, Pennsylvania and its remaining members sent to reinforce existing U.S.C.T. regiments.

== Purpose ==
Not much is known about this unit, except that it did not see combat. It was enlisted for a period of only 100 days; enlistments of 3 to 4 months or so were usually for emergencies. Many members transferred to other units before the unit was disbanded, including its officers.

An army under CSA General Jubal Early had threatened Washington DC in the beginning of July but had fled to West Virginia by August. The troops may have been raised to serve in the defense of Washington DC or replace Pennsylvanian units sent to Maryland.

== Known members ==
There were 100 men (3 officers, 18 NCOs, 2 Musicians, and 77? Soldiers) assigned to the unit at formation.

=== Officers ===
==== Captain Converse Southard ====
(b. Unknown (c.1838) - d. November 20, 1876; 37 yrs old).

Converse A. Southard was born in Newark, Licking County, Ohio the son of Joseph and Priscilla Southard. In 1860 Southard was residing in Peoria City, Peoria County, Illinois and was a clerk before the war. He was commissioned as a 1st Lieutenant in the Illinois Militia on Aug 16, 1861 and was assigned to Company "A", 47th Illinois Volunteer Infantry (IVI). He was promoted to Captain of Company "A", 47th Illinois on May 9, 1862 but resigned his commission on October 29, 1862. He attended the Command School at Camp William Penn from March 30, 1864 and was commissioned as a Captain in the Pennsylvania Militia on July 20, 1864. He was assigned to command a company in what was anticipated to be a full regiment of Colored Troops that was later reorganized as an Independent Company. Southard was given an honorable discharge on August 11, 1864 and was then transferred to Paducah, Kentucky to command Company "C", 119th US Colored Infantry Regiment, U.S. Colored Troops and mustered in on February 28, 1865. He was later charged in July with "Behavior Unbecoming of an Officer"; reportedly he had been found with a woman in his quarters who was undressing. He requested to resign his commission for the good of the service on July 7, was marked Absent Without Leave on August 19, and was mustered out on September 7, 1865. He later resided in Buffalo, New York after the war and died there of "congestion of the brain" on November 20, 1876. His remains were shipped by rail to his birthplace of Newark, Ohio where he was interred in the Cedar Hill Cemetery on November 23, 1876.

==== First Lieutenant Enon M. Harris ====
(b. March 3, 1839 - d. October 26, 1908; 69 yrs old)

Enon Major Harris was commissioned as a First Lieutenant in the Pennsylvania Militia on July 20, 1864. He received a transfer to the 8th US Colored Heavy Artillery Regiment. He had the distinction of being one of 27 veteran Navy and Army officers assigned to the Honor Guard for Abraham Lincoln's coffin. They escorted it to and from Independence Hall in Philadelphia and guarded Lincoln while he lay in state. Harris was buried at Arlington Cemetery.

==== Second Lieutenant George W. Keys ====
Was commissioned as a Second Lieutenant in the Pennsylvania Militia on July 21, 1864. He transferred to Company A, 41st US Colored Infantry Regiment, U.S.C.T. on September 10, 1864. Promoted to Adjutant on August 14, 1865.

=== Non-Commissioned Officers ===
- First Sergeant William Lee
- Sergeant Daniel Young
- Sergeant Daniel Wright
- Sergeant Enoch P. Gibbs
- Sergeant Levi M. Hood
- Sergeant Crawford Hardy
- Sergeant Harvy P. London
- Sergeant Anthony Y. Wilson
- Corporal Martin Gibbs
- Corporal Thomas L. Wesley
- Corporal Jacob T. Compton
- Corporal Jacob S. Christy
- Corporal James Patten
- Corporal Isaac P. Brown
- Corporal Charles W. Calaman
- Corporal Henry P. M’Kinsey
- Corporal Ebenezer J. Miller
- Corporal Jacob M. Miller

=== Musicians ===
- Enoch Ferguson
- Abraham Brown

=== Private Soldiers ===
- Levi Alexander
- John A. Archie
- William Brown
- Christopher Brown
- Jacob Boyer
- Philip Bell
- William S. Bell
- Ephraim Brown
- Henderson Brown
- William H. D. Bush
- William Cain
- William Cole
- John Clemans
- James Chambers
- Samuel Christy
- Jacob T. Cumpton (b? - d. September 6, 1905) mustered into the company as a private on July 28, 1864. He transferred as a corporal to Company D, 24th US Colored Infantry Regiment, U.S.C.T. on November 14, 1864 and was promoted to Sergeant on February 23, 1865. Cumpton was mustered out with his Company on October 1, 1865.
- John Davis
- William H. Dixson
- Franklin Duffin
- Edward Emery
- Isaac B. Fray
- William Fray
- John Giddings
- Benjamin M. Gooseberry (b? - d. September 16, 1906) mustered in as a private on July 28, 1864. He transferred as a private into the 41st US Colored Infantry Regiment, U.S.C.T. on September 21, 1864. Gooseberry was discharged on completion of his term of service on September 30, 1865.
- Benjamin Hill
- Ferdinand Hearkless
- Daniel Harmon
- James Hallow
- John Hood
- Alfred W. Jones
- Andrew Jackson
- Cyrus Johnson
- Samuel L. Little
- Isaac Lewis
- Michael Lamborn
- Joshua Mason
- Lewis L. Nixon
- Richard Plater
- William H. Paxson
- William Platter
- George W. Patts
- William Prigg
- Robert Peck
- Isaiah Queman
- William H. Rudolph
- George W. Richardson
- John H. Rozell
- William H. Smith
- Charles Sheridan
- William P. Scott
- Henry Smith
- James H. Samons
- Francis H. Smith
- William H. Thomas
- Henry Wilson
- William H. White
- David M. Wells
- Joseph Wilkinson
- John Wooden
- Richard Wilson

== See also ==
- List of Pennsylvania Civil War regiments
- List of United States Colored Troops Civil War units
