= 123rd Pennsylvania Infantry Regiment =

Union Army infantry regiment

123rd Pennsylvania Volunteer Infantry
- Active: August 1862 - May 13, 1863
- Country: United States
- Allegiance: Union
- Branch: Infantry
- Engagements: American Civil War: Battle of Antietam (in reserve); Battle of Fredericksburg; Battle of Chancellorsville

Commanders
- Notable commanders: Col. John B. Clark

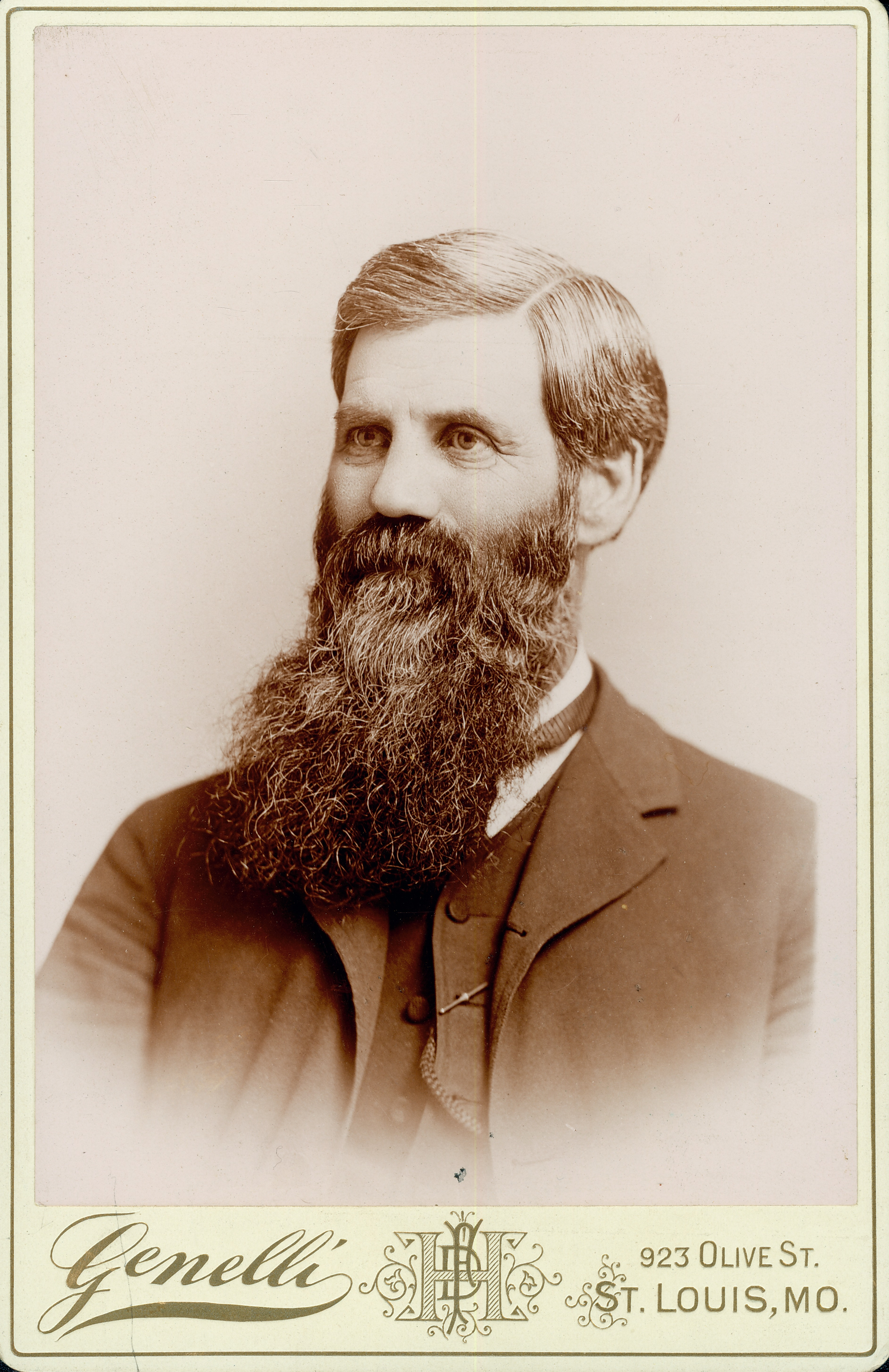
1st Lieutenant William P. McNary, 123rd Pennsylvania

The 123rd Pennsylvania Volunteer Infantry was an infantry regiment that served in the Union Army during the American Civil War.

== Service ==
The 123rd Pennsylvania Infantry was organized at Allegheny City, Pennsylvania, and mustered in August 1862 for nine month's service under the command of Colonel John B. Clark.

The regiment was attached to 2nd Brigade, 3rd Division, V Corps, Army of the Potomac, to May 1863.

The 123rd Pennsylvania Infantry mustered out May 13, 1863.

== Detailed service ==
Moved to Harrisburg, Pennsylvania, then to Washington, D.C., August 20 to 23, 1862. Maryland Campaign September 6 to 24, 1862. Duty at Sharpsburg, Maryland, until October 30. Movement to Falmouth, Virginia, October 30 to November 19. Battle of Fredericksburg, December 12 to 15. Burnside's Second Campaign, "Mud March," January 20 to 24, 1863. Duty at Falmouth until April 27. Chancellorsville Campaign, April 27 to May 6. Battle of Chancellorsville, May 1 to 5.

== Casualties ==
The regiment lost a total of 72 men during service; 3 officers and 27 enlisted men killed or mortally wounded, 1 officer and 41 enlisted men died of disease.

== Commanders ==
- Colonel John B. Clark

== See also ==
- List of Pennsylvania Civil War Units
- Pennsylvania in the Civil War
