= 215th Pennsylvania Infantry Regiment =

Union Army infantry regiment

215th Pennsylvania Volunteer Infantry (9th Union League)
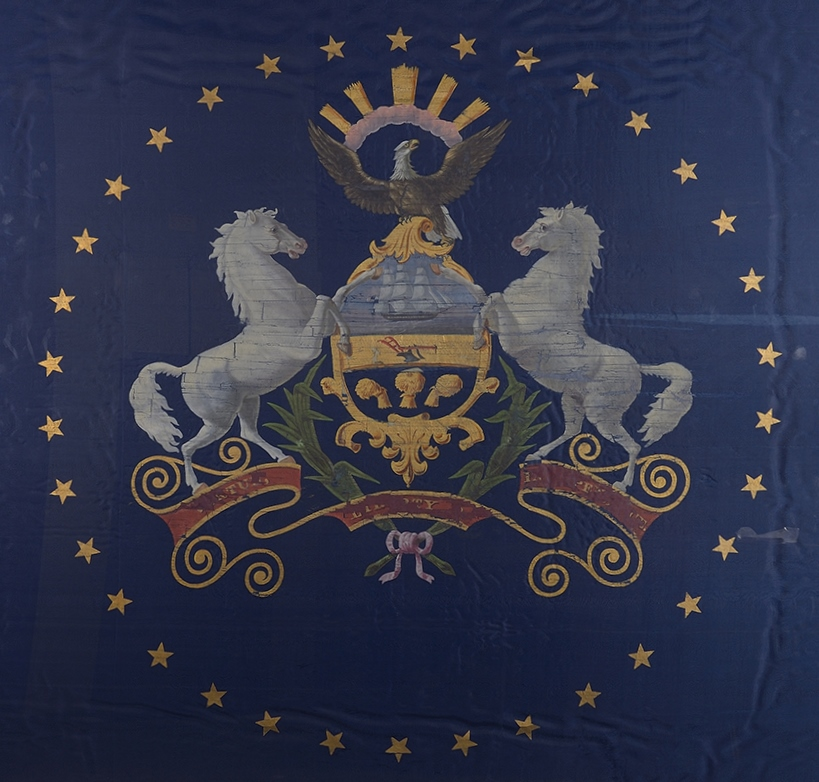
- State Flag of Pennsylvania, circa 1863.
- Active: 21 April – 31 July 1865
- Country: United States of America
- Allegiance: Union
- Branch: Union Army
- Role: Infantry
- Size: 1,117 (mustered in)

The 215th Regiment Pennsylvania Volunteer Infantry (9th Union League) was an infantry regiment of the Union Army in the American Civil War. It was raised in Philadelphia close to the end of the war, and spent most of its slightly more than three months of service guarding Confederate prisoners while garrisoning Fort Delaware.

== History ==
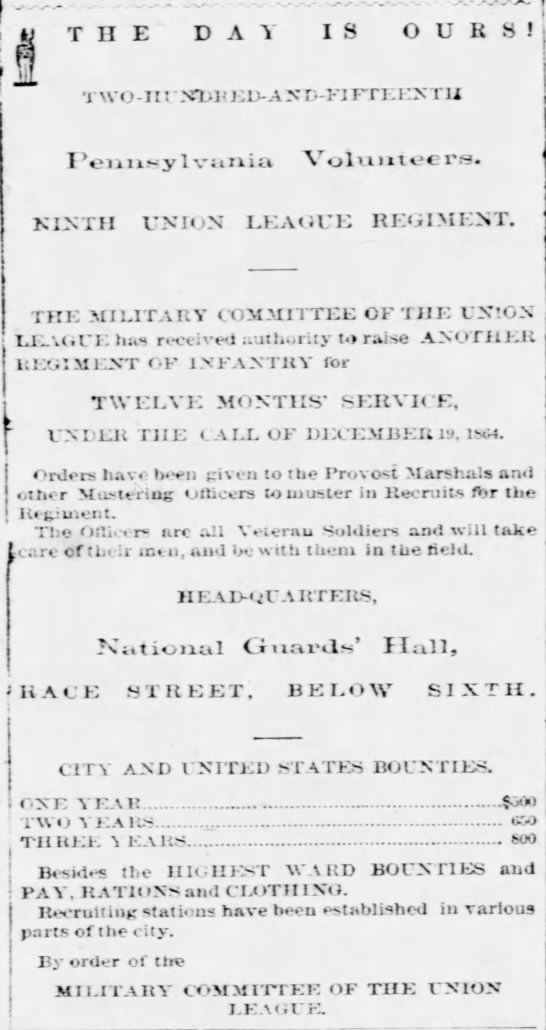
A newspaper recruiting advertisement for the regiment

The 1,117-strong 215th Pennsylvania Infantry was organized at Camp Cadwalader on 21 April 1865, with men from Philadelphia and the counties of Lancaster, Bucks, and Northampton, under the command of Regular Army officer Colonel Francis Wister, the last Pennsylvania regiment raised for the war. Though most of the regiment was from Philadelphia, Company G was recruited at Easton in Northampton County. It was raised by the Union League for a one year term of service to replace returning veteran units, and was also known as the 9th Union League Regiment. The regiment left Philadelphia on 26 April. After its organization, the regiment was sent to Dover, Delaware, and was split into detachments that served in Delaware and the Eastern Shore of Maryland on guard duty. The entire regiment was relocated to Fort Delaware in early June to guard Confederate prisoners and garrison the fort before being mustered out on 31 July. During its service, eleven men of the regiment died of disease.

== See also ==
- List of Pennsylvania Civil War regiments
- Pennsylvania in the Civil War
