= Culture of Allentown, Pennsylvania =

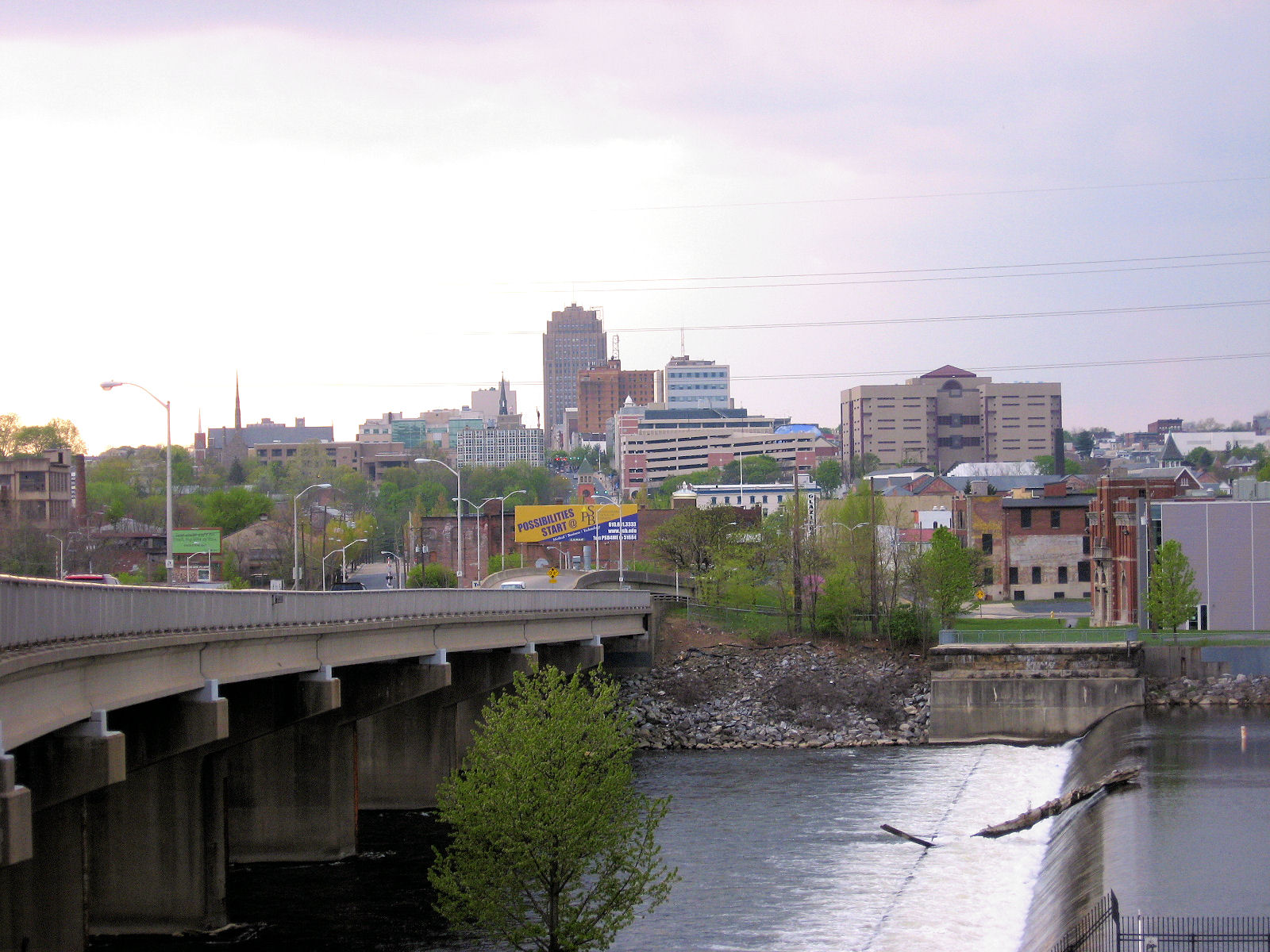
Allentown, the largest city in the Lehigh Valley, third-largest city in Pennsylvania, and county seat of Lehigh County, in May 2010

The culture of Allentown, Pennsylvania dates back to the early 18th century settlement of the city and the surrounding Lehigh Valley, which was then part of the Province of Pennsylvania, one of the original Thirteen Colonies, by German immigrants almost exclusively affiliated the Lutheran, Moravian, and Reformed faiths, three of the most prominent Protestant denominations.

Prior to the arrival of German immigrants, Allentown and the region was inhabited by the Lenape Native American tribe, which spoke the Unami language.

The German immigrants who settled present-day Allentown and the surrounding Lehigh Valley were mostly fleeing religious persecution and war at the time in Germany and were drawn to Allentown and its surrounding communities by the region's reputation for religious freedom and fertile farming land. Later, in the 19th and early 20th centuries, the city and region's reputation as a central manufacturing location during the American Industrial Revolution attracted a second wave of German and other European immigrants who sought economic opportunity and jobs afforded by its anthracite coal, iron ore, steel, railroad, and other manufacturing and mining industries.

== History ==
=== American Revolution ===
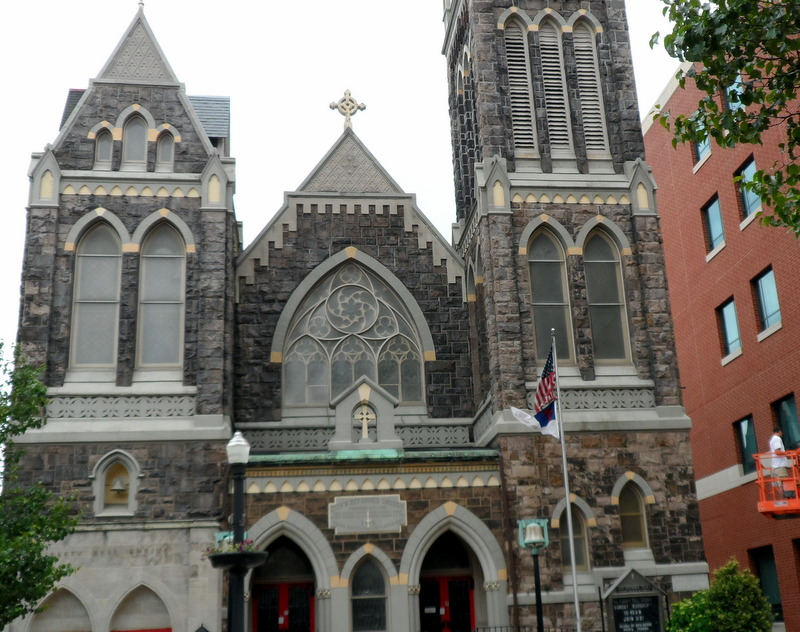
Zion Reformed Church at 622 Hamilton Street in Center City Allentown, where the Liberty Bell was hidden from the British for nine months during the occupation of Philadelphia from September 1777 to June 1778

Allentown's influential role in support of the American Revolution and Revolutionary War is celebrated in the city with various museums and memorials. Until 2023, the Liberty Bell Museum inside Zion Reformed Church at 622 West Hamilton Street in Allentown honored the role Allentown played in protecting and concealing the Liberty Bell, which was hidden underneath this Allentown church's floor boards from September 1777 to June 1778 during the British Army's occupation of Philadelphia. At the corner of Jordan and Gordan streets in Center City, a memorial exists on the site where General George Washington and the Continental Army housed Hessian mercenary prisoners of war during the Revolutionary War.

=== American Civil War ===
The Soldiers and Sailors Monument, located on Allentown's center square on South 7th Street, was erected on October 19, 1899, in honor of Union Army soldiers from Allentown and local Lehigh Valley towns and boroughs who died in combat in the American Civil War. In April 1861, the 47th Pennsylvania Infantry Regiment from Allentown and its suburbs was deployed to defend the national capital in Washington, D.C., and later launched bold and effective attacks on Confederate positions, tilting the Civil War in the Union's favor.

=== Industrial Revolution ===
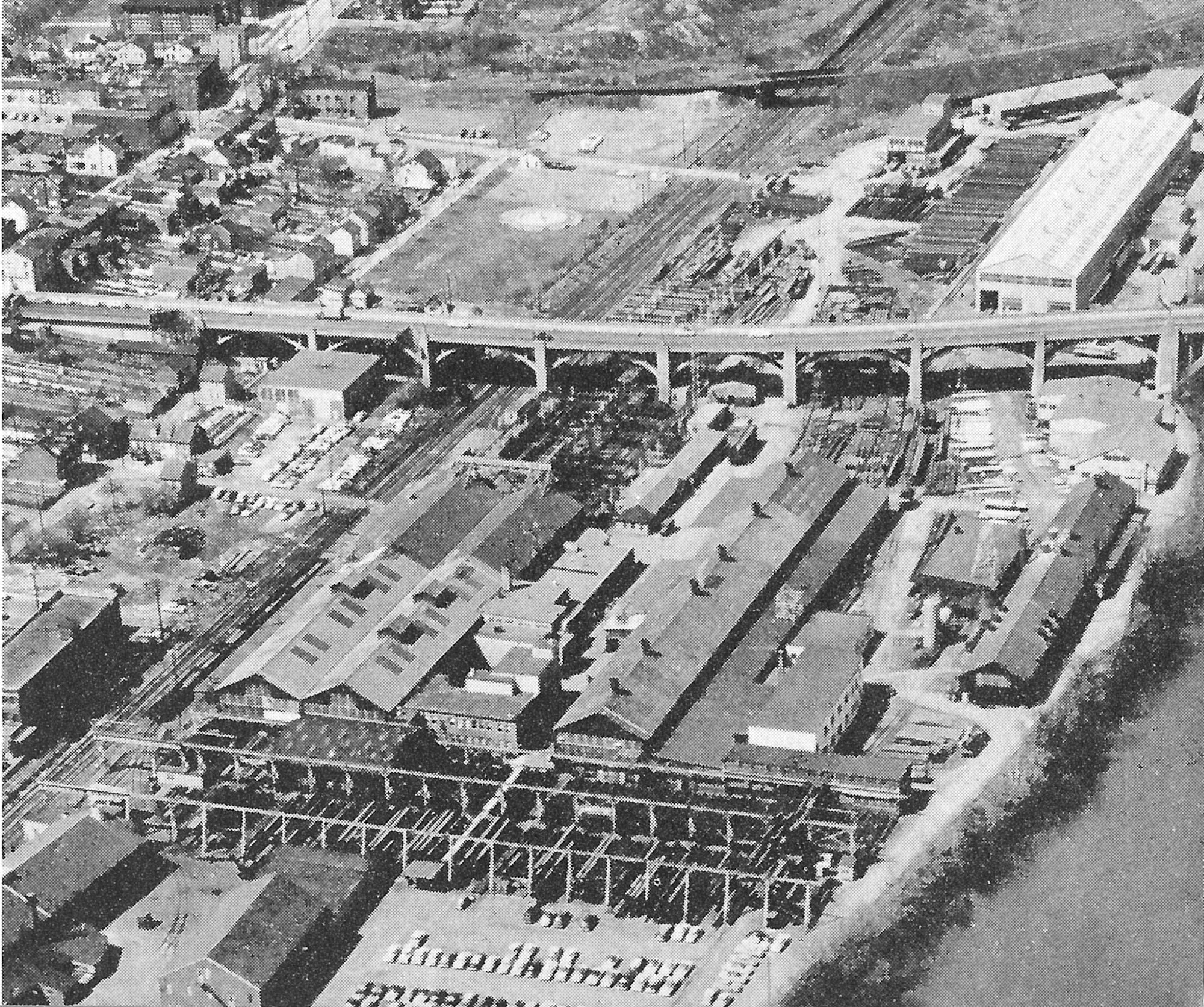
An aerial view of Lehigh Structural Steel Company in Allentown in 1959

In the early 19th century, Allentown was one of the cities and regions that sparked the Industrial Revolution in the United States as the city emerged as an early national mining and industrial manufacturing hub. Allentown's Lehigh Canal, which afforded the city and region the ability to utilize the Lehigh River for the transport of anthracite coal, iron ore, steel, and other products from the region to nation's largest markets, especially New York City and Philadelphia made Allentown a center of early American industrialization, which continued until the late 20th century when foreign competition, regulations, trade practices, manufacturing costs, innovation and other trends combined to force substantial downsizings, bankruptcies, and outsourcing of many of these traditionally strong regional manufacturing industries.

=== Immigration ===
Migration to Allentown and the region continued through most of the 19th and 20th century with additional German immigrants followed by waves of Italians and Asians. In the late 20th century, Hispanics, primarily Puerto Ricans arriving directly from Puerto Rico or indirectly from nearby New Jersey and New York City, immigrated to the city and currently comprise a sizable percentage of the city's population.

As of the 2010 census, Allentown's demographic composition was 43.2% White (non-Hispanic), 42.8% Hispanic, 11.6% Black, and 2.2% Asian.

=== Rust Belt reputation ===
In the late 20th and early 21st century, Allentown's image and character as one of the nation's most prominent examples of a rugged industrial Rust Belt city was reflected globally in the city's appearance in several movies, television shows, and songs.

== Media ==
Allentown's media includes print, web, radio and television outlets. Allentown is part of the Philadelphia television media market, the fourth-largest television market in North America as of 2023. WFMZ-TV Channel 69, based in Allentown, has studios and a transmitting site atop South Mountain. WLVT-TV, also based in Allentown, is the local PBS affiliate.

Major Philadelphia-based network stations serving Allentown include: KYW-TV (CBS), WCAU (NBC), WPVI-TV, and WTXF-TV (Fox). There are also other network and local television stations.

Allentown has two daily newspapers, The Morning Call and The Express-Times, and numerous weekly and monthly print publications.

Allentown has the 68th-largest radio market in the United States by Arbitron. Stations licensed to Allentown include WAEB-AM (talk, news and sports), WAEB-FM (Top 40 music), WDIY (NPR and public radio), WHOL (rhythmic contemporary), WLEV (adult contemporary music), WMUH (Muhlenberg College campus radio), WSAN (Fox Sports Radio and Philadelphia Phillies broadcasts), WZZO (hard rock music) and others. Most major New York City and Philadelphia radio stations are received in Allentown.

== Recreation ==
=== Amusement parks and zoos ===
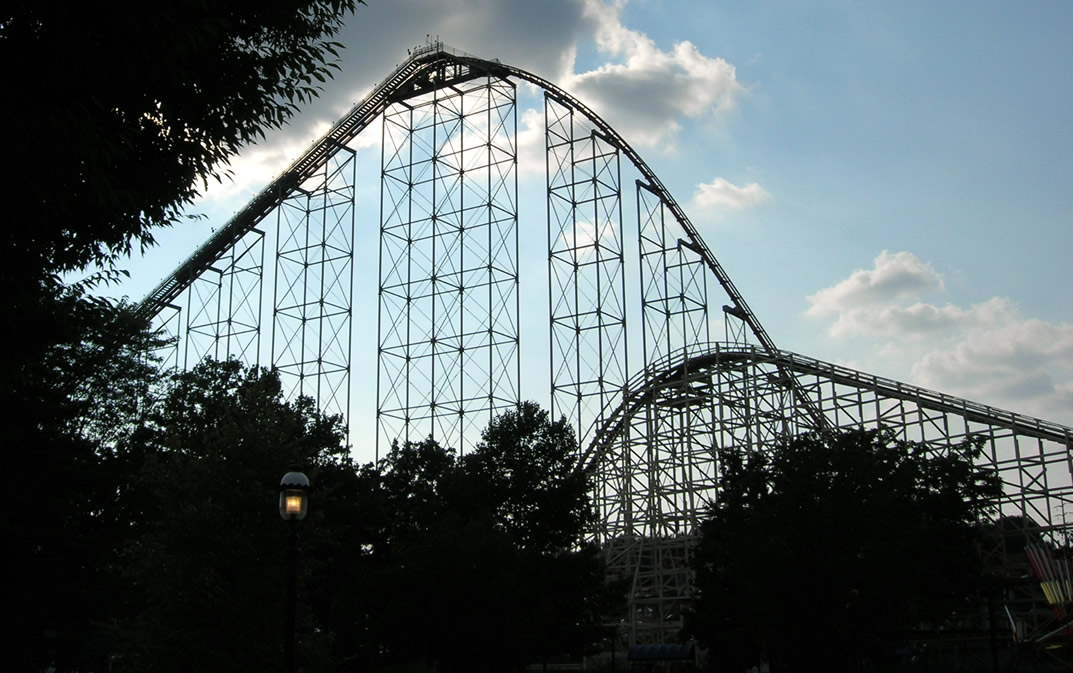
The first drops of Dorney Park's Steel Force and Thunderhawk rollercoasters in Allentown. At 5,600 ft (1,700 m), Steel Force is eighth longest steel rollercoaster in the world.

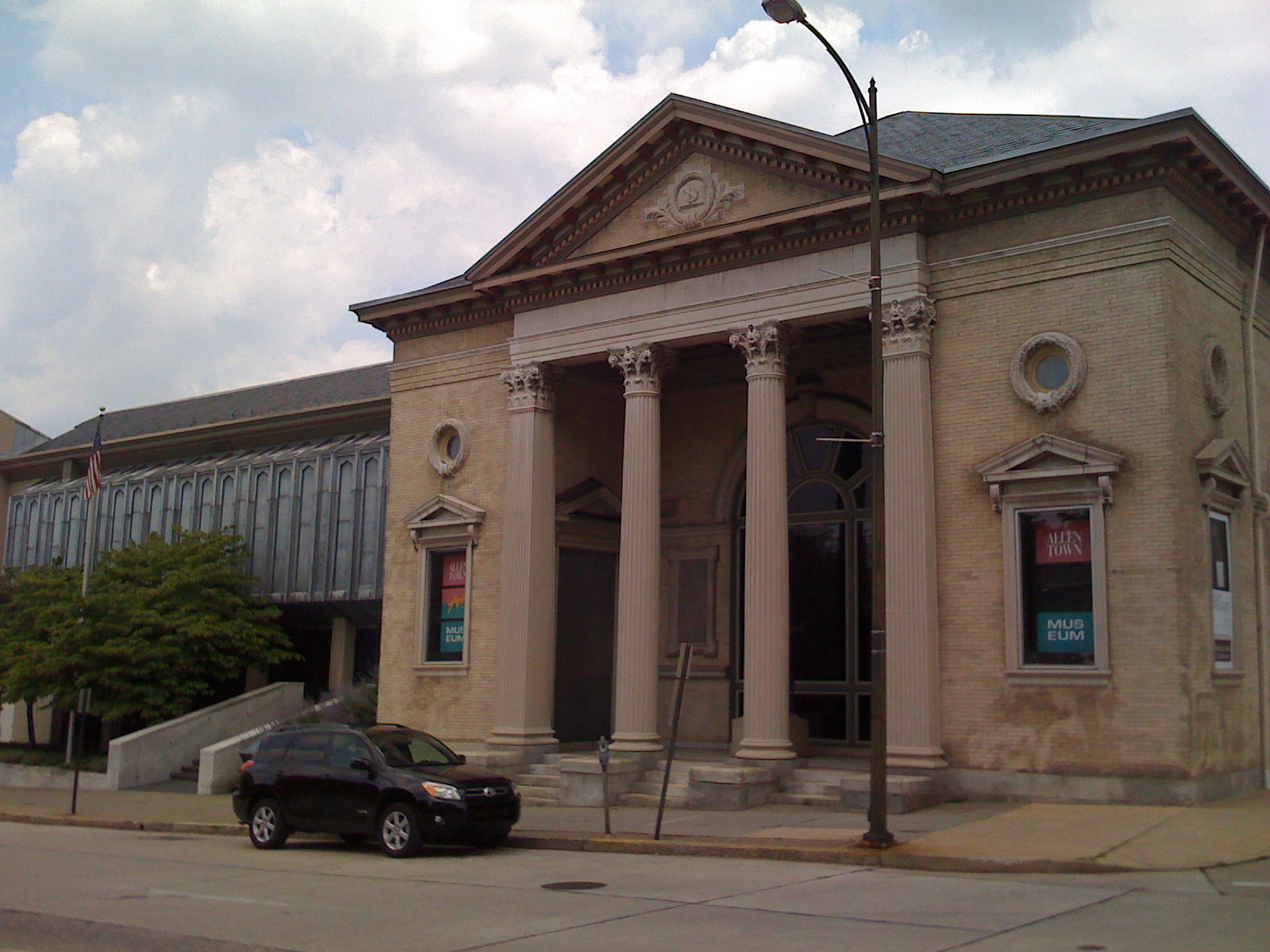
Allentown Art Museum at 31 N. 5th Street in July 2008

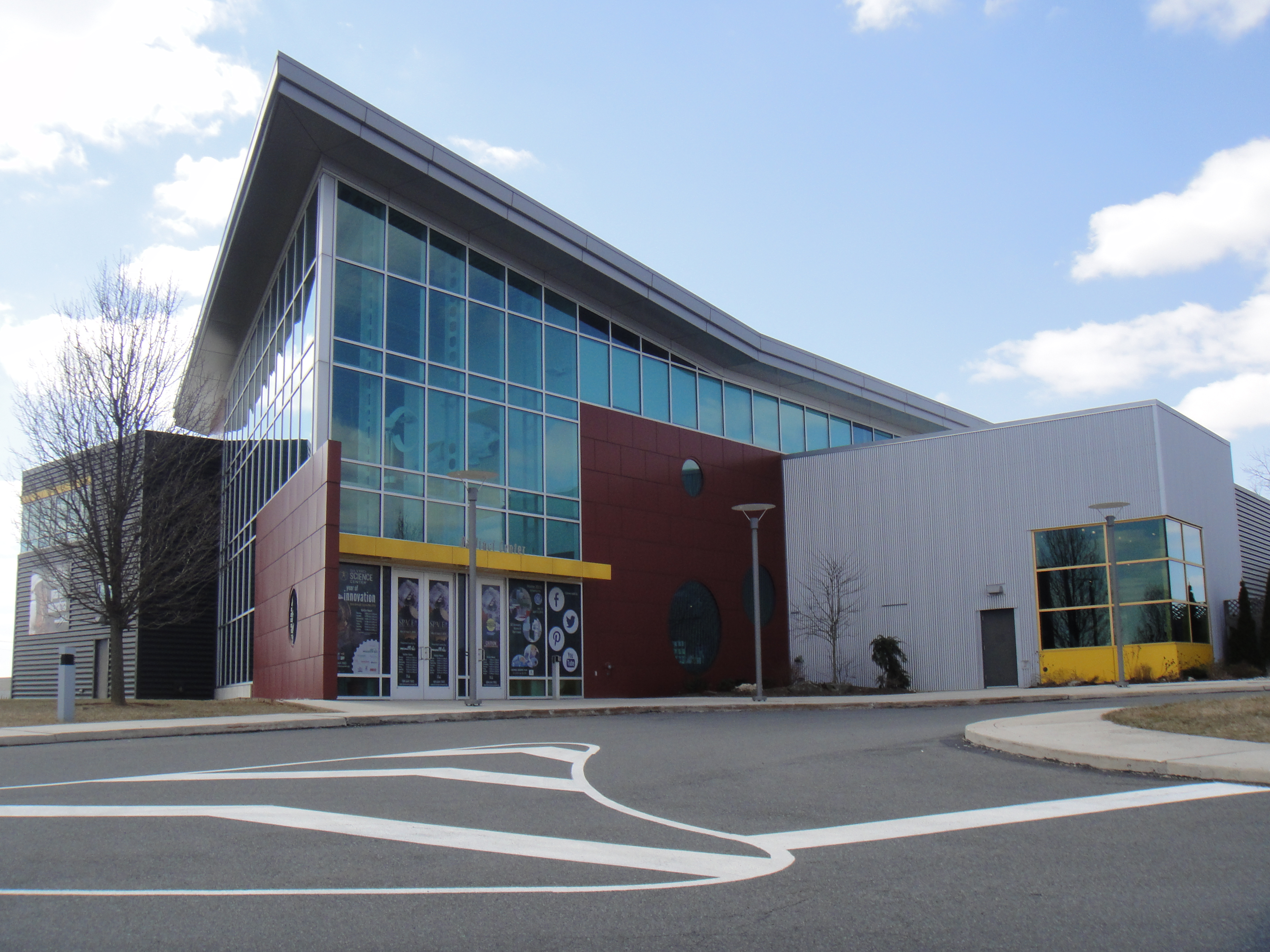
Da Vinci Science Center at Cedar Crest College in March 2014

Dorney Park & Wildwater Kingdom is the area's main amusement park. The Lehigh Valley Zoo and the Trexler Nature Preserve are the two zoos in the Lehigh Valley. The William F. Curtis Arboretum is the area's arboretum.

=== Annual events ===
The Great Allentown Fair, one of the nation's longest standing fairs held annually since 1852, is held the end of each August and early September. Mayfair Festival of the Arts, an arts festival, is held annually on the campus of Cedar Crest College each May. Musikfest, the nation's largest free music festival, is held annually in neighboring Bethlehem each August. Das Awkscht Fescht, the country's largest antique and classic car show, is held annually in early August in neighboring Macungie; in August 2022, it will hold its 58th consecutive show.

The Lehigh Valley Spring Home Show is held annually in March at the Allentown Fairgrounds, and the Lehigh Valley Auto Show is also held annually in March at Stabler Arena in Center Valley.

The Drum Corps International has been held for over thirty years at J. Birney Crum Stadium, bringing together the top junior drum and bugle corps in the world over two nights of competition.

=== Art ===
Allentown Art Museum, founded in 1934, is the city's main fine art institution. Baum School of Art, located in Center City Allentown and founded in 1926, is the city's leading art school.

The city has long struggled with graffiti throughout the city. In an effort to eliminate it, the city has painted murals in some of its city parks and high graffiti locations, arresting graffiti artists and giving out rewards for turning in those who deface buildings with graffiti.

=== Cuisine ===
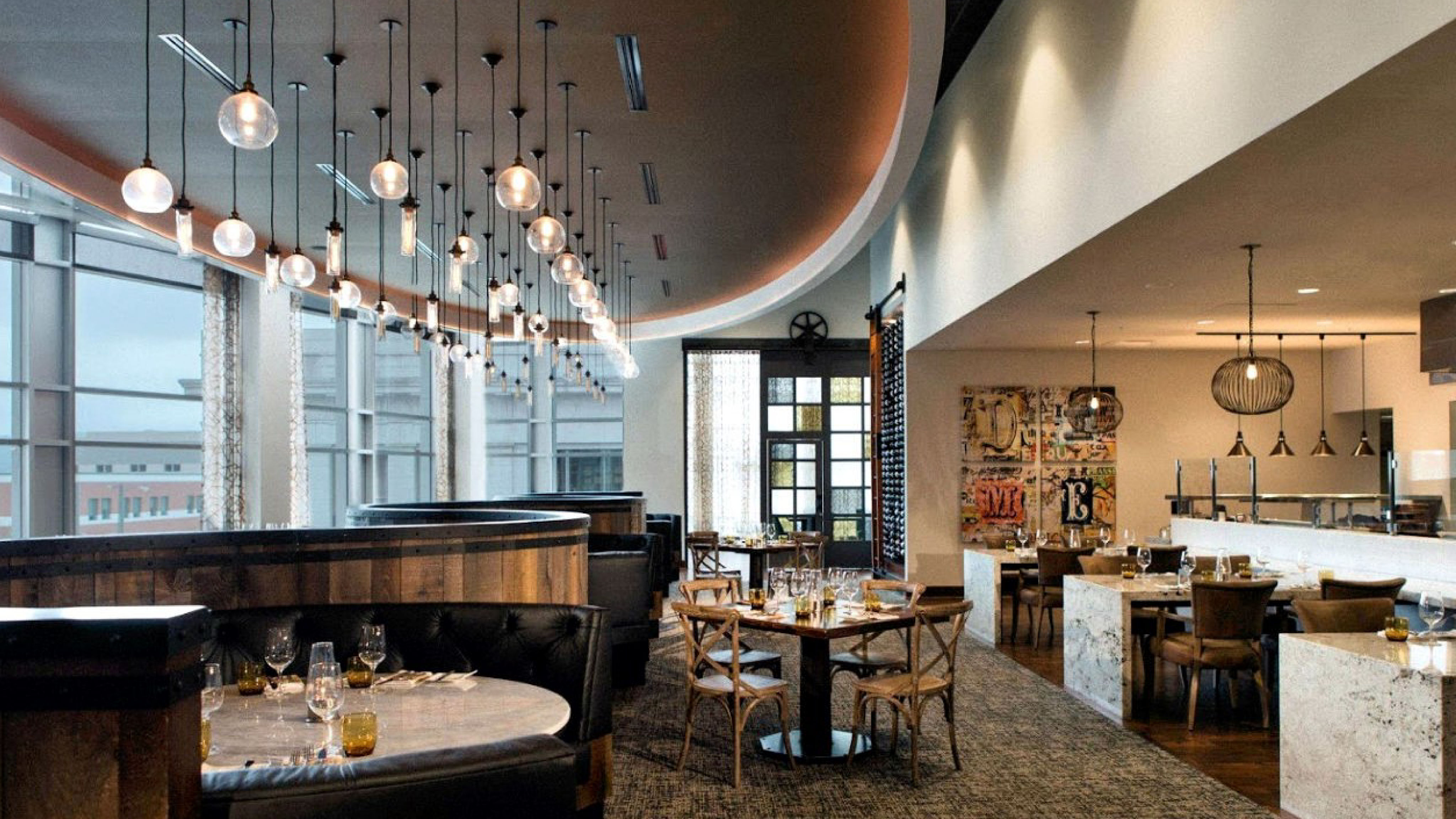
The Dime, an upscale restaurant and bar in Center City Allentown

Allentown is influenced by cuisine from the Pennsylvania Dutch, Hispanic and Latino Americans, and Philadelphia. Allentown has a local variant of the Philadelphia cheesesteak, and local pizza parlors. Pennsylvania Dutch foods, including head cheese, liver pudding, sous vide, chow-chow, apple butter, and others are available at some diners across the region. Ethnic food types represented include Dominican, Puerto Rican, West Indian, Japanese, Italian, Lebanese and Syrian. A regionally-famous hot dog chain, Yocco's Hot Dogs, founded in 1922, maintains two restaurants in the city and two additional locations in Allentown suburbs.

=== Golf ===
Allentown and its suburbs are home to several golf courses. Saucon Valley Country Club, located in Upper Saucon Township, hosted the 2009 U.S. Women's Open. Allentown is home to a high quality city-run golf course, Allentown Municipal Golf Course, located at 3400 Tilghman Street. Others include Brookside Country Club in Macungie, Lehigh Country Club on Cedar Crest Boulevard in Allentown, Olde Homestead Golf Club in New Tripoli, Shepherd Hills Golf Club in Wescosville, and Wedgewood Golf Course in Coopersburg.

=== Museums ===
Allentown is home to multiple museums, including:

- Allentown Art Museum, art
- America On Wheels, automotive transportation
- Da Vinci Science Center, science
- George Taylor House, historic house
- Lehigh Valley Heritage Museum, local history
- Liberty Bell Museum, history
- Mack Trucks Historical Museum, automotive transportation
- Museum of Indian Culture, Native American
- Trout Hall, historic house

=== Music ===
==== Rock, hip hop, and punk music ====
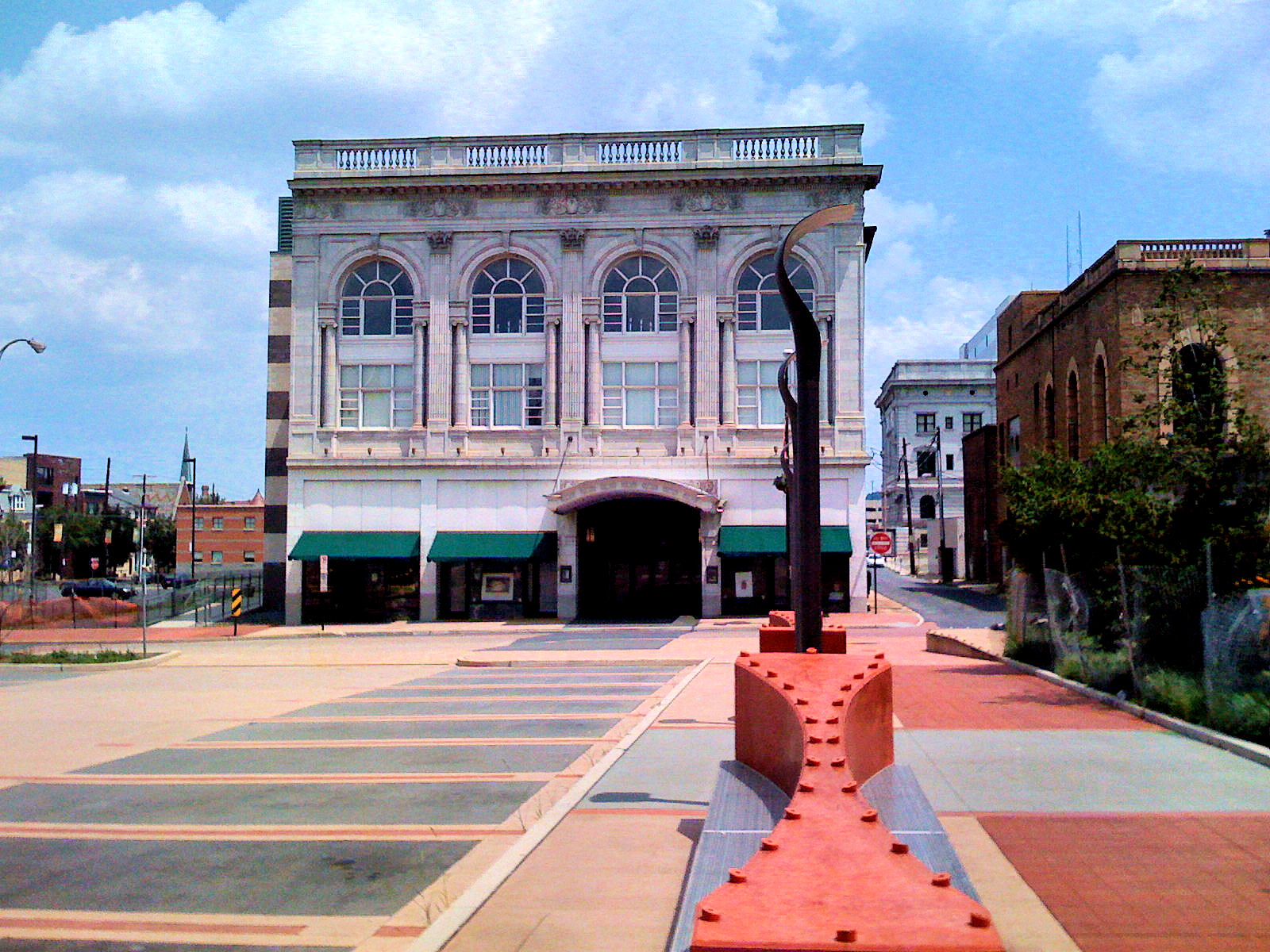
Miller Symphony Hall in Allentown is the home to the Allentown Symphony Orchestra

Allentown has a long tradition of producing successful national musical acts and groups. In the 21st century, Pissed Jeans, a hardcore punk group founded in Allentown in 2005, and Pearls and Brass, a stoner rock band founded in 2001 from neighboring Nazareth, both started as local Allentown acts, were ultimately signed, and have since developed strong national and global followings.

Rock and hip hop performances at Allentown nightclubs have included appearances by Hollywood Undead, Pitbull, Day26, Metro Station, Fabolous, and other performers.

Allentown has a large radio market featuring many genres of music and also is within broadcasting reach of most major Philadelphia and New York City stations.

==== Symphony and bands ====
Allentown Symphony Orchestra performs at Miller Symphony Hall in Center City Allentown north of Hamilton Street on North 6th Street. The city also has several citizen bands, which perform at the West Park bandshell and elsewhere, including the Allentown Band, the oldest civilian concert band in the United States, the Marine Band of Allentown, the Municipal Band of Allentown, and the Pioneer Band of Allentown.

Youth Education in the Arts (YEA) is headquartered in Allentown its home and sponsors The Cadets Drum and Bugle Corps, a ten-time DCI world champion, in addition to a senior drum and bugle corps, a competitive scholastic marching band circuit, and the Urban Arts Center in the Lehigh Valley.

=== Shopping ===
Allentown and its suburbs are home to several shopping areas and indoor malls, including Lehigh Valley Mall in Whitehall Township, South Mall in Salisbury Township, Promenade Saucon Valley in Center Valley, The Shoppes at Trexler in Trexlertown, Whitehall Plaza in Whitehall Township, and others.

== In popular culture ==
Allentown's reputation as a rugged blue collar city has led to many references to the city in popular culture:

=== 21st century ===
- Parts of the 2019 movie Glass were filmed in Allentown at the Allentown State Hospital and elsewhere.
- Allentown is mentioned in the 2011 movie The Hangover Part II when Ed Helms sings a profane, modified version of "Allentown" to Zach Galifianakis as they ride in a boat in Thailand. The version appears on the film's soundtrack, The Hangover Part II: Original Motion Picture Soundtrack.
- Allentown is mentioned in the lyrics of indie rock band Say Anything in their song "Fed to Death," the opening song on their 2009 album Say Anything. The song's lyrics also reference neighboring Nazareth, Pennsylvania.
- In the 2008 movie The Wrestler, Allentown is mentioned by Mickey Rourke as a location where he had wrestled leading up to his comeback.
- On Season 4, Episode 9 of the HBO series The Sopranos, titled "Whoever Did This", which aired initially on November 10, 2002, the scene in which Christopher Moltisanti is ordered by Tony Soprano to dispose of the remains of Ralph Cifaretto after Tony kills him were filmed in Lower Nazareth Township.

=== 20th century ===
- The television production company Medstar Television, which produced the series Medical Detectives from 1996 to 2000, and the series Forensic Files from 2000 on, is headquartered in Allentown. Locations throughout the city have been used as settings for dramatic reenactments of crimes profiled in the shows.
- Portions of the 1988 movie Hairspray were filmed at Dorney Park & Wildwater Kingdom and other Allentown locations.
- The city is the subject of the popular Billy Joel song, "Allentown", originally released on The Nylon Curtain album in 1982. Joel's song uses Allentown as a metaphor for the resilience of working class Americans in distressed industrial cities during the recession of the early 1980s.
- The X-Files season 3 episode "Nisei," which aired November 25, 1995, is the first of a two-part episode in which character Dana Scully joins a UFO abductee group in Allentown. In the season 4 episode "Memento mori," which aired February 9, 1997, characters Fox Mulder and Scully return to Allentown to follow up with one of the women from Nisei.
- Allentown is referenced as the secret location of a bomb planted by The Joker in Frank Miller's comic book series, Batman: The Dark Knight Returns, published in 1986.
- Allentown is the hometown of up and coming showgirl Peggy Sawyer in the long-running, Tony Award-winning Broadway musical 42nd Street, released in 1980, and its associated Academy Award-nominated movie. When Sawyer expresses her desire to leave Broadway to return to Allentown, the show's director and entire cast successfully dissuade her by singing the famed musical number "Lullaby of Broadway".
- Hiding The Bell, a 1968 historical fiction novel by Ruth Nulton Moore, chronicles events surrounding American patriots' hiding of the Liberty Bell in Allentown during the American Revolutionary War in 1777 to avoid its capture by the British Army.
- Allentown was the subject of the 1963 Irving Gordon song "Allentown Jail," which was subsequently recorded by several other artists, including The Kingston Trio, The Lettermen, The Seekers and Jo Stafford.
- In the 1960 musical Bye Bye Birdie, character Rosie Alvarez is from Allentown. In the song "Spanish Rose," she sings: "I'm just a Spanish Tamale according to Mae/ Right off the boat from the tropics, far, far away/ Which is kinda funny, since where I come from is Allentown, PA."
- Allentown was mentioned in the song "200 Years Old" on the 1975 Frank Zappa album Bongo Fury.
- Dorney Park & Wildwater Kingdom, located outside of Allentown in South Whitehall Township, is featured in the 1968 movie Where Angels Go, Trouble Follows.
- Exterior shots of Allentown's 24-story PPL Building are featured in the 1954 movie Executive Suite.

== See also ==
- Buildings and architecture of Allentown, Pennsylvania
- List of people from the Lehigh Valley
- Media in the Lehigh Valley
