= Haveli (disambiguation) =

A haveli is a historic private mansion in India or Pakistan.

Haveli may also refer to:

- Haveli (novel), a 1993 novel by Suzanne Fisher Staples
- Haveli, Pune, a town in Pune District, Maharashtra, India
- Haveli taluka, a taluka or tehsil in Haveli subdivision, Pune District, Maharashtra, India
- Haveli District, a district of Azad Kashmir, Pakistan
- Haveli Lakha, a town in Okara District, Punjab, Pakistan
- Haveli Tehsil, AK, Azad Kashmir, Pakistan
- Haveli Tehsil, J&K, Jammu and Kashmir, India

== See also ==
- Nagar Haveli, a taluka (subdistrict) in Dadra and Nagar Haveli and Daman and Diu, India
