= Family of Secrets =

Book by Russ Baker

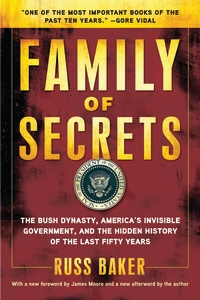
- Author: Russ Baker
- Original title: Family of Secrets: The Bush Dynasty, the Powerful Forces That Put It in the White House, and What Their Influence Means for America
- Language: English
- Subject: Political history
- Genre: Nonfiction
- Publisher: Bloomsbury Press
- Publication date: 2008
- Publication place: United States
- Pages: viii, 577
- ISBN: 978-1-5012-6397-2
- Dewey Decimal: 973.931092
- LC Class: E904 .B35 2009

Family of Secrets is a book by Russ Baker. Published by Bloomsbury Press in 2008, it describes alleged connections between the Bush family and the Central Intelligence Agency. The book asserts that President George H. W. Bush was linked to the Watergate scandal and the assassination of John F. Kennedy. Family of Secrets was poorly received by critics.

== The book's allegations ==
Baker was reportedly drawn to John F. Kennedy assassination conspiracy theories after discovering a report that George H. W. Bush could not remember where he was on November 22, 1963.

In the book he levels various charges of corruption at the Bush family, whom he ties into the entry of the United States into World War II, the formation of the CIA, the assassination of John F. Kennedy and the Watergate scandal.

According to Baker, the first President Bush became an intelligence agent in his teenage years and was later at the center of a plot to assassinate Kennedy that included his father, Prescott Bush, Vice President Lyndon B. Johnson, CIA Director Allen Dulles, Cuban and Russian exiles and emigrants, and various Texas oilmen. He also names Bob Woodward of The Washington Post as an intelligence agent who conspired with John Dean to remove President Richard Nixon from office for opposing the oil depletion allowance.

The book observes that when George H.W. Bush was at Phillips Academy his roommate was the nephew of George de Mohrenschildt, and that in later years, Bush and De Mohrenschildt fraternized in Dallas. In 1962, de Mohrenschildt befriended Lee Harvey Oswald. Baker also makes a connection between the Bushes and the Watergate scandal. He describes Watergate "not as a ham-handed act of political espionage but as a carefully orchestrated farce designed to take down President Richard Nixon".

== Reviews ==
In his 2015 profile of Baker, Ben Schreckinger observed that the book was "trounced by the mainstream media". Lev Grossman of Time magazine said that Baker "connects the dots between the Bushes and Watergate, which he far-fetchedly describes not as a ham-handed act of political espionage but as a carefully orchestrated farce designed to take down President Richard Nixon." Washington Post reviewer Jamie Malanowski contended that Baker "overplayed his hand" and "stretches evidence," using rhetorical devices to do so. Malanowski opined that "there are more crutches in these pages than in the grotto at Lourdes. In a Los Angeles Times review, Tim Rutten called the book "preposterous" and said that it was "singularly offensive" because it "recklessly impugns, in the most disgusting possible way," the reputations of living and dead people. Salon published excerpts from the book in 2018 upon the occasion of Bush's death.

Investigative journalist Tim Weiner, winner of the Pulitzer Prize and author of CIA and FBI histories, said the book is "a carnival of conspiracy theory". He told Boston magazine in 2015 that Baker is "driven by the search for truth that drives reporters everywhere, but conspiracy theory in which there's a giant octopus that connects disparate events and provides a unified field theory explanation of otherwise disparate events is not either journalism or history."

In the 2019 anthology Conspiracies and Conspiracy Theories in American History, the authors observe that a CIA memo indicates that a "George Bush" was briefed on the Kennedy assassination. But the book describes as "tenuous at best" Baker's claim that George H.W. Bush was connected to supposed CIA involvement in the assassination.
