= Jane Amsterdam =

American magazine and newspaper editor (born 1951)

- Born: June 15, 1951 (age 74); Philadelphia, Pennsylvania, U.S.
- Education: Cedar Crest College
- Occupation: Editor
- Years active: 1973–1993
- Known for: Manhattan, inc.; New York Post
- Spouse: Jonathan Larsen (m. 1985; div. 2000)

Jane Ellen Amsterdam (born June 15, 1951) is a former American magazine and newspaper editor. After successive magazine editorships during the 1970s, she joined The Washington Post as section editor. She later became founding editor of Manhattan, inc., and was widely credited with making it into a dynamic, National Magazine Award-winning magazine. She later joined the New York Post, becoming the first female editor of a major New York City newspaper. At the New York Post, she worked to increase the paper's credibility and journalism standards. By the time she left the Post in 1989, she was one of only six women in the country editing a newspaper with a circulation of over 100,000.

== Early life and education ==
Amsterdam was born in Philadelphia, the third of four children. Her mother, Fay, was a housewife and her father, Morton, a dentist, university professor, and former dean of University of Pennsylvania School of Dental Medicine. She was raised in Bala Cynwyd, Pennsylvania and worked for her high school newspaper. She attended Cedar Crest College in Allentown, Pennsylvania, where which she interned at Philadelphia magazine.

== Career ==
After graduating from Cedar Crest College in 1973, she joined Connecticut Magazine, where she worked until 1976 as assistant editor, associate editor, and executive editor. In 1976, she became the founding managing editor of New Jersey Monthly, which she left in early 1978 to become editor of New Times magazine, which folded by the end of the year.

In 1979, she edited The American Lawyer for six months, then spent seven weeks as executive editor of New York magazine. Later that year, she was hired by The Washington Post as Style section editor, where she worked until 1983. At the Post, she collaborated with reporters Bob Woodward and Patrick Tyler on an article regarding allegations of improper stock practices by CIA deputy director Max Hugel, who resigned the day after the article appeared. Shortly afterward, Amsterdam was made deputy editor of a Washington Post investigative unit under Woodward.

=== Manhattan, inc. ===
In 1983, Amsterdam was hired by D. Herbert Lipson to begin assembling his new magazine, Manhattan, inc. The first issue debuted in September 1984. After only four issues, it won the 1985 National Magazine Award for general excellence. Under Amsterdam's editorship the magazine was also a National Magazine Award finalist for the same category in 1986 and 1987 and for the Single-Topic Issue category in 1988. Amsterdam was widely credited for the magazine's success.

A colleague at Manhattan, inc. recalled: "one of her great gifts is that she packages stories so that people love to read them." She also had a reputation for being hard to work with, going through two executive editors before the third issue. In March 1987, Amsterdam abruptly resigned in a dispute over editorial control, accusing Lipson of wanting to favor advertisers.

Fortune editor John Huey lists Amsterdam as a formative influence. Journalist Ron Rosenbaum dedicated his 1987 book Manhattan Passions to her.

In January 1988, Amsterdam joined book publishing company Alfred A. Knopf as senior editor.

=== New York Post ===
In May 1988, Amsterdam was hired by the New York Post as editor and was given full control over all of the newspaper's sections except the editorial division. Within six months the paper, famous for tabloid journalism and headlines such as "Headless Body in Topless Bar," had toned down sensationalism and increased investigative reporting. She also oversaw the debut of the Post's new Sunday edition, a feature intended to compete against rival New York tabloids the Daily News and Newsday, and worked on the section's book review and travel supplements. Within a year after her hiring, Amsterdam was forced out by Post publisher Peter Kalikow, who reportedly complained that the more credible form of journalism was not helping sell more papers.

Amsterdam was a member of the American Society of Newspaper Editors, and served as a judge for the National Magazine Awards in 1988 and 1989, and the Pulitzer Prize in 1989 and 1990. Cedar Crest College, her alma mater, awarded her an honorary degree in 1989. In 1993, she became a senior producer on the ABC News program Day One before retiring from the media industry. That same year, she took up competitive carriage driving.

== Personal life ==
From 1985 to 2000, Amsterdam was married to writer Jonathan Z. Larsen, the former editor-in-chief of The Village Voice, with whom she adopted a son, Edward Roy, in 1990.
