= Russ Baker =

American investigative journalist

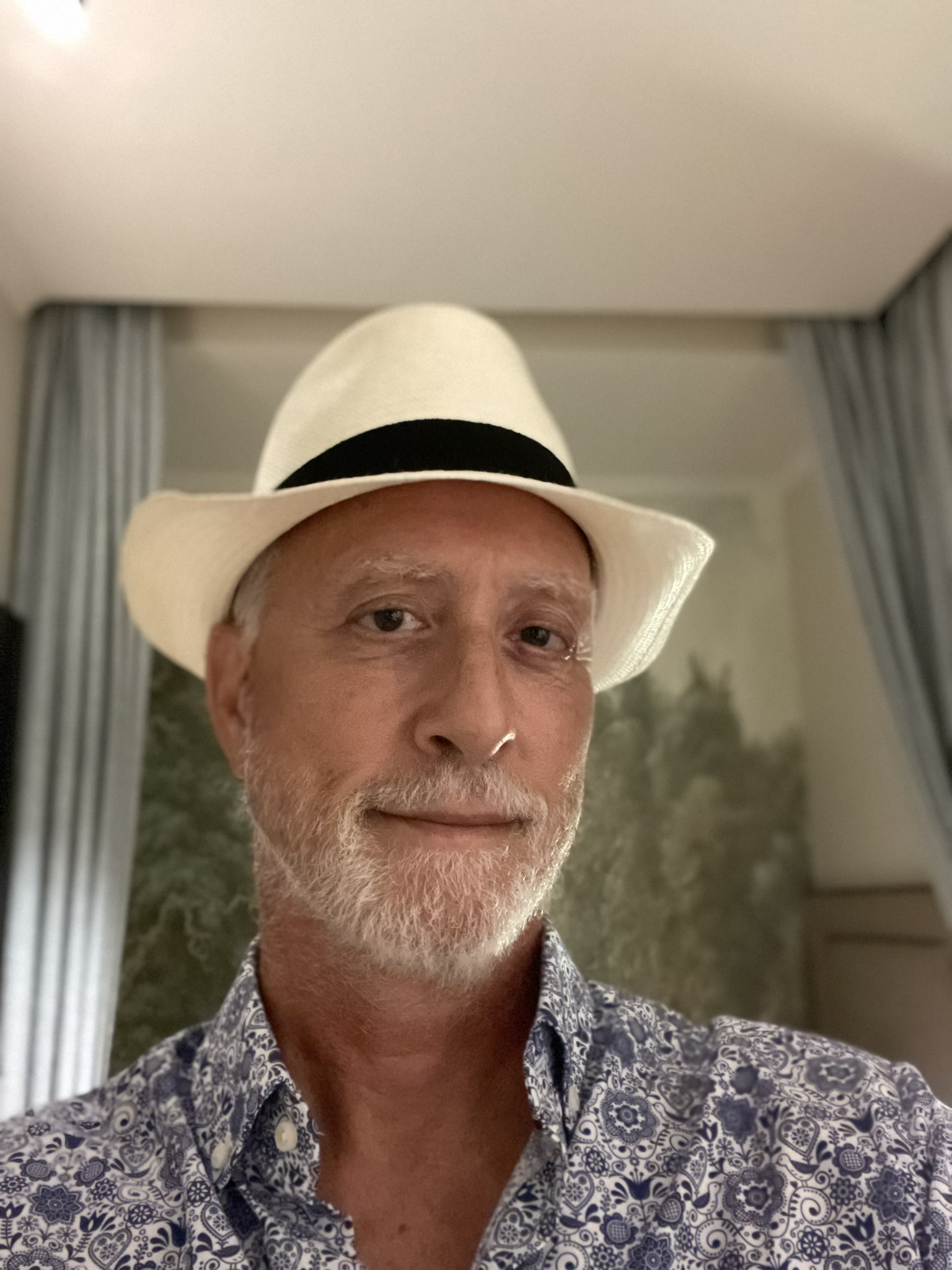
Baker in 2024

Russ Baker (born 1958) is an American author and investigative journalist. Baker is the editor-in-chief and founder of the nonprofit news website WhoWhatWhy. Earlier in his career he wrote for a variety of publications, including The New York Times Magazine, The New Yorker, The Washington Post, Esquire, Vanity Fair, The Christian Science Monitor, The Nation, The Guardian, Wired, and The Village Voice.

Baker is the author of the 2008 investigative history book Family of Secrets that alleges that a young future president George H.W. Bush served secretly in the CIA in the 1950s and 1960s and investigates his network and activities in Dallas at the time of the assassination of President John F. Kennedy and later in Washington during the Watergate scandal.

== Career ==
Baker grew up in California, received a bachelor’s degree in political science from UCLA and a master’s degree in journalism from the Graduate School of Journalism at Columbia University. After graduation, Baker worked as a metro reporter with Newsday in New York City. He then reported on tribal genocide in Burundi for the largest circulation newspaper in the Netherlands and for the St. Louis Post-Dispatch, the fall of the Berlin Wall for CBS Radio and The Christian Science Monitor, and, for a variety of publications, the fall of Romanian dictator Nicolae Ceausescu.

In 1989, he became a New York correspondent for The Christian Science Monitor. He also wrote for the Village Voice.

His articles included a report on the efforts of the controversial Church of Scientology to recruit Michael Jackson, produced an early critique of New York Times journalist Judith Miller’s claims that Iraq possessed “weapons of mass destruction” (which became a factor in the US’s subsequent invasion of that country), and on the West’s indifference to capturing accused Serbian war criminal Radovan Karadzic. An article in The Nation on George W. Bush's disappearance from his US-based military unit during the Vietnam War received a 2005 award from the Deadline Club, the New York chapter of the Society of Professional Journalists, for a web-exclusive article.

Baker has been on the adjunct faculty of the Columbia University Graduate School of Journalism and was a contributing editor to the Columbia Journalism Review.

Following the 2013 Boston Marathon bombings, Baker and his team at WhoWhatWhy published dozens of articles and podcasts about inconsistencies in government statements regarding the alleged perpetrators. Among other things, they noted that the FBI had visited with the Tamerlan Tsarnaev in years prior to the bombings he was accused of, noted ties between the Tsarnaev family and people in the US national security apparatus, and pointed out that US government itself had said that the brothers were themselves unable to make the types of sophisticated bombs used at the marathon.

=== WhoWhatWhy ===
At the time that Family of Secrets was released, Baker founded an independent, nonprofit news organization, WhoWhatWhy. Board members and advisory board members have included journalism figures, among them Alicia Patterson Foundation director Margaret Engel, former Village Voice editor Jonathan Larsen, Pulitzer Prize winner Sydney Schanberg and Salon founder David Talbot. WhoWhatWhy accepts no ads and is funded entirely on reader contributions and the work of "a mix of paid journalists and skilled volunteers." Its donors have included Joan Konner, a former dean of the Columbia Journalism School, the Larsen Fund, and TV producer and activist Norman Lear. WhoWhatWhy generated strong interest in its reporting that raised questions about whether the full story had been told about the alleged Boston Marathon bombers, and noted inconsistencies and anomalies in accounts provided by the FBI and other law enforcement entities.

He was interviewed on a television program, Greater Boston, and profiled by Boston magazine. The latter explored Baker’s career and reputation as context for evaluating the reporting. The article included this statement: "Baker has abandoned the mainstream media and become a key player on the fringe, walking that murky line between conventional investigative journalist and wild-eyed conspiracy theorist." However, the Boston writer, Ben Schreckinger, got a different perspective when he interviewed former CBS News anchor Dan Rather, who described Baker as "an indefatigable reporter who has made a specialty of digging deep into stories when most other people have left the story. And he's very good at raising the right questions." Schreckinger said "it would be a lot easier to dismiss Baker as a nut and move on if it weren't for his three decades of award-winning investigative-reporting experience", noting that Baker was among the first to raise concerns about Colin Powell's now-infamous presentation on Iraq at the United Nations at a time when The New York Times and The Washington Post were still praising Powell.

In a 2016 Columbia Journalism Review profile, Neal Gabler reported that journalist Bill Moyers called him an "indefatigable researcher from whom I could learn something about a subject that I hadn't known because he so often looked under the next rock, rounded the next corner, asked the next question after everyone else had gone home or to the local bar", adding that Baker seemed "unimpressed with conventional wisdom, quickly spotted and dismissed spin, and wasn't intimidated by the powers-that-be." Baker told Gabler that in journalism, "everyone has been taught: Don't go too far. Don't dig too deep."

WhoWhatWhy covers national and international topics, with an emphasis on politics and power, the environment, and war and peace. Its editors include Gerald Jonas, formerly of the New York Times and the New Yorker, William Dowell, who served as a correspondent for Time and CNN, and Klaus Marre, who worked for The Hill. It has a weekly podcast.

=== Family of Secrets ===
Baker's 2008 book Family of Secrets outlines historical connections of members of the Bush political dynasty, including Prescott Bush, President George H.W. Bush and President George W. Bush, to individuals in the Central Intelligence Agency, military-industrial complex and global financial system. Baker asserts that George H. W. Bush was linked to the Watergate scandal and the assassination of John F. Kennedy. Family of Secrets contends that the first President Bush became an intelligence agent in his teenage years and was later at the center of a plot to assassinate Kennedy that included his father, Prescott Bush, Vice President Lyndon B. Johnson, CIA Director Allen Dulles, Cuban and Russian exiles and emigrants, and various Texas oilmen. It asserts that Bob Woodward of The Washington Post was an intelligence agent who conspired with John Dean to remove President Richard Nixon from office for opposing the oil depletion allowance.

In his 2015 profile of Baker, Schreckinger observed that the book was "trounced by the mainstream media". Lev Grossman of Time magazine said that Baker "connects the dots between the Bushes and Watergate, which he far-fetchedly describes not as a ham-handed act of political espionage but as a carefully orchestrated farce designed to take down President Richard Nixon." Washington Post reviewer Jamie Malanowski contended that Baker "overplayed his hand" and "stretches evidence," using rhetorical devices to do so. Malanowski opined that "there are more crutches in these pages than in the grotto at Lourdes. In a Los Angeles Times review, Rutten called the book "preposterous" and said that it was "singularly offensive" because it "recklessly impugns, in the most disgusting possible way," the reputations of living and dead people.

Salon published excerpts from the book in 2018 upon the occasion of Bush's death. A 2019 Salon article by Jefferson Morley noted that a "handful of declassified records suggest that Bush’s relationship to the agency might have run deeper than his overt roles as director, vice president, and president. The records, which I believe were first reported in Russ Baker’s 2009 book, 'Family of Secrets,' went unmentioned in the recent media coverage of Bush’s death."

== Personal life ==
Baker says that because of his work as an investigative journalist, he prefers not to discuss his family or details on his location.
