= Cedar Realty Trust =

American real estate company

Cedar Realty Trust, Inc.
- Company type: Subsidiary
- Founded: 1984; 42 years ago
- Headquarters: Virginia Beach, Virginia
- Key people: M. Andrew Franklin, President & CEO; Crystal Plum, CFO
- Revenue: ▼$34 million (2022)
- Net income: ▲$44 million (2022)
- Total assets: ▼$234 million (2022)
- Total equity: ▼$82 million (2022)
- Parent: Wheeler Real Estate Investment Trust
- Website: cedarrealtytrust.com

Cedar Realty Trust, Inc. is a real estate investment trust that invests in shopping centers. It is a subsidiary of Wheeler Real Estate Investment Trust. As of December 31, 2022, the company owned 19 properties with 2.9 million square feet of leasable space primarily in the Northeastern United States, including 7 properties in Pennsylvania. The company's major tenants are TJX Companies (4.8% of revenues), Kohl's (4.2% of revenues), Shaw's (3.8% of revenues), Dollar Tree (3.5% of revenues), and Walmart (3.5% of revenues). The only notable property owned by the company is The Shoppes at Trexler.

== History ==
The company was founded in 1984 as Cedar Shopping Centers. In October 2003, the company became a public company via an initial public offering.

In 2005, the company acquired a 27-property portfolio for $90 million.

In 2009, RioCan Real Estate Investment Trust acquired a 15% stake in the company as part of a joint venture agreement.

In 2010, the company acquired 7 shopping centers from PREIT for $168 million.

In 2011, the company changed its name to Cedar Realty Trust. It also sold 5 sites in Ohio anchored by Discount Drug Mart.

In 2011, Bruce Schanzer became chief executive officer.

In July 2022, the company sold a portfolio of 33 shopping centers to a joint venture between a fund managed by DRA Advisors LLC and KPR Centers for $879 million.

In August 2022, Wheeler Real Estate Investment Trust acquired the company. M. Andrew Franklin became president and chief executive officer of the company and Crystal Plum became chief financial officer.
