= Jonathan Larsen =

American journalist and philanthropist (born 1940)

Jonathan Zerbe Larsen (born January 6, 1940) is an American journalist and philanthropist who was editor-in-chief of The Village Voice from 1989 to 1994 and is senior editor and board member of the news website WhoWhatWhy.

The son of former Time Inc. President Roy Larsen, he was previously a correspondent and editor of Time magazine, working as its Saigon bureau chief during the Vietnam War.

From 1974 to 1979, he was editor of New Times. After leaving journalism in the 1990s he devoted his time to environmental and charitable interests. He is a trustee of the Natural Resources Defense Council, Cambridge College (Massachusetts) and Sterling College (Vermont). From 1985 to 2000 he was married to Jane Amsterdam, former editor of Manhattan, inc. and the New York Post, and was previously married to Katharine Wilder.
