= Mayfair Festival of the Arts =

Arts festival in Pennsylvania, United States

Coordinates: 40.60010°N 75.50032°W

Mayfair
- Genre: Visual arts, performing arts, garden arts, children's art, art education
- Dates: Annually the third week in May (from Friday through Sunday)
- Locations: Allentown, Pennsylvania, U.S.
- Years active: 1984–2019, 2021–
- Website: www.cedarcrest.edu/mayfair

Mayfair Festival of the Arts is a multidisciplinary arts festival, including visual arts, performing arts, garden arts, children's art, and art education, held annually in May on the campus of Cedar Crest College in Allentown, Pennsylvania.

The annual festival began in 1984, and was held continuously until 2020, when it was cancelled during the COVID-19 pandemic. It returned in May 2021, and has been held continuously since.
