= Shabanu: Daughter of the Wind =

1989 novel by Suzanne Fisher Staples

- First edition cover
- Author: Suzanne Fisher Staples
- Publisher: Alfred A. Knopf Books for Young Readers
- Publication date: 1989
- ISBN: 978-0-394-84815-0

Shabanu: Daughter of the Wind is a 1989 novel by American author Suzanne Fisher Staples. It is narrated by a young girl who lives in the Cholistan Desert and centers on the story of her coming-of-age. It is succeeded by the novels Haveli and The House of Djinn. Staples had lived in Asia for about twelve years prior to writing the novel.

== Plot summary ==
Shabanu lives in the Cholistan Desert in Pakistan, where they play games near the border of India. She is the second daughter of a peaceful, loving family of camel breeders. Shabanu is on the brink of womanhood; her older sister Phulan is already marriageable, and soon will be married to Hamir, a cousin of their family's. Shabanu is also betrothed to Hamir's brother, Murad. At twelve years old, Shabanu is not interested in marriage; she enjoys tending to the animals and especially teaching tricks to her beloved camels, Mithoo and Xhush Dil and Guluband, a camel her father had recently sold against her will. Before Phulan's wedding, however, disaster strikes: Shabanu and Phulan accidentally stumble upon several strange men in the desert, among them an old, wicked landowner named Nazir Mohammad, who was known to have murdered Shabanu's cousin, Lal Khan, in the past. Nazir notices Phulan while hunting quail with his brother and nephew. He decides that Phulan will be the prize for whoever bags the most quail. When Shabanu tells her father, he is enraged and goes to tell Nazir that Phulan is betrothed and that Nazir does not have legal ownership of her. Out of anger, Nazir later murders Hamir, whom Phulan was to marry. Phulan has to marry Hamir's brother, Murad, instead, a decision she doesn't oppose, much to Shabanu's anger. When Shabanu learns that she must marry Nazir's brother, Rahim-sahib, an old man who already has three wives, to save her family and her sister's new marriage, she must make a choice between running away, or staying to let her family have their way, which in her eye she thinks is akin to sacrificing her.

== Main characters ==
- Shabanu – an eleven-year-old girl living in the Cholistan Desert with her family
- Phulan – Shabanu's older sister who later takes Murad away from her as her husband.
- Mama – Shabanu's mother
- Dalil Abbasi (Dadi) – Shabanu's father, a camel breeder
- Auntie – the sister-in-law of Dalil Abbasi
- Grandfather - Shabanu's grandfather and Dadi's father
- Fatima - Sharma's daughter
- Sharma - A female cousin of mama and dadi who was known for illegally leaving her abusive husband
- Hamir - Shabanu's cousin; Phulan's husband-to-be, but was murdered by Nazir Mohammad
- Murad - Shabanu's cousin; Shabanu's husband-to-be, but who later marries Phulan instead
- Nazir-Mohammad - wicked landowner who murders Hamir
- Rahim-sahib - Nazir's brother, who later takes Shabanu as his fourth wife

== Sequel ==
In 1993, Suzanne Fisher published a sequel to Shabanu: Daughter of the Wind, Haveli. Haveli shows Shabanu as a mother at age 18 and her ups and downs of her new life at home, her marriage, her daughter, and her life.

In the recent installment of the Shabanu series, The House of Djinn follows the life, hardships, decisions, and events that occur in the life of Mumtaz, Shabanu's daughter.

== Awards and nominations ==
Awarded the Newbery Honor in 1990.

== Reception and criticism ==
Shabanu has received mainly negative reviews from critics, being criticized for the at times shallow plot and under-developed characters. Shabanu: Daughter of the Wind has also received a number of criticisms for not being up-to-date on Islamic marital customs.
