= Suzanne Fisher Staples =

American children's author (1945–2022)

- Born: August 27, 1945; Philadelphia, Pennsylvania, U.S.
- Died: April 29, 2022 (aged 76); Nicholson, Pennsylvania, U.S.
- Education: Cedar Crest College
- Occupation: Writer
- Writing career
- Genre: Children's literature

Suzanne Fisher Staples was an American writer of children's books.

== Early life and education ==
Born in Philadelphia, Pennsylvania on August 27, 1945, Suzanne Staples was a daughter of Robert Charles Fisher and Helen (Brittain) Fisher. She grew up in northeastern Pennsylvania with her sister and two brothers.

Staples graduated from Lakeland High School in Jermyn, Pennsylvania and earned a Bachelor of Arts degree from Cedar Crest College in Allentown, Pennsylvania.

== Career ==
Staples worked in Asia as a correspondent and editor at United Press International for 13 years during the 1970s and 1980s and then for two years at The Washington Post. While in Pakistan, Staples learned to speak Urdu, which she credited with helping her to develop relationships with people, listen to their stories, and understand nuance. These experiences enriched her writing, providing the geographical and cultural details that made her settings integral to the novels she eventually wrote. She covered events in Afghanistan from 1979 to 1982, noting later that it was the most important period of her reporting. In 1981 she was present at a war council of Afghan tribal elders that was led by Ahmed Shah Massoud, who told her she would be hearing about the Soviet–Afghan War for years to come.

Staples's first two novels, Shabanu: Daughter of the Wind (1989) and its sequel Haveli (1993) are set in Pakistan and explore the life of a young woman facing an arranged marriage. Shabanu, a Newbery Honor book in 1990, is a story about a girl who longs for the freedom to shape her own destiny in a society where women face arranged marriages and have minimal autonomy. Haveli, set several years later, delves into Shabanu's feelings of entrapment after marrying a wealthy landowner with three jealous, spiteful wives. The House of Djinn (2008) is a sequel to Shabanu and Haveli taking place ten years after the events in Haveli. It completes the Pakistani trilogy.

Staples' third novel Dangerous Skies (1996) set in Virginia's Chesapeake Bay follows two children, a white boy and a black girl, who struggle to hold their friendship together. In Shiva's Fire (2000) Staples returns to South Asia to tell the tale of Parvati, a girl in India blessed with the magical ability to dance through fire akin to the Hindu god Shiva, who learns to use her magic wisely. Under the Persimmon Tree (2005) is set in Afghanistan and Pakistan after the 2001 terrorist attacks and centers on Najmah, an Afghan refugee whose family is devastated by war, and her teacher. The Green Dog (2003) is a memoir about the author's childhood.

== Personal life ==
Following her time in Asia, Staples returned to the U.S. and settled in Nicholson, Pennsylvania. She was married to Wayne Harley. She died April 29, 2022.

== Books ==
- Staples, Suzanne Fisher (1989). Shabanu: Daughter of the Wind. New York: Knopf Books for Young Readers. ISBN 0-394-84815-2.
- Staples, Suzanne Fisher (1993). Haveli. New York: Knopf Books for Young Readers. ISBN 978-0-679-84157-9.
- Staples, Suzanne Fisher (1996). Dangerous Skies. New York: Farrar, Straus & Giroux (BYR). ISBN 978-0-374-31694-5.
- Staples, Suzanne Fisher (2000). Shiva's Fire. New York: Farrar, Straus & Giroux (BYR). ISBN 978-0-374-36824-1.
- Staples, Suzanne Fisher (2003). The Green Dog: A Mostly True Story. New York: Farrar, Straus and Giroux. ISBN 978-0-374-32779-8.
- Staples, Suzanne Fisher (2005). Under the Persimmon Tree. New York, NY: Macmillan Publishers. ISBN 978-0-374-38025-0.
- Staples, Suzanne Fisher (2008). The House of Djinn. New York: Farrar, Straus and Giroux. ISBN 978-0-374-39936-8.
