= D. Herbert Lipson =

American magazine publisher (1929-2017)

David Herbert Lipson
- Born: May 3, 1929; Philadelphia, Pennsylvania, U.S.
- Died: December 25, 2017 (aged 88); Philadelphia, Pennsylvania, U.S.
- Resting place: West Laurel Hill Cemetery, Bala Cynwyd, Pennsylvania, U.S.
- Education: Lafayette College (BA)
- Occupations: Publisher; Magazine owner

David Herbert Lipson (May 3, 1929 – December 25, 2017) was an American magazine publisher. He was the executive chairman of Metrocorp Publishing and owner of Boston, Manhattan, inc., and Philadelphia magazines.

== Early life and education ==
Lipson was born May 3, 1929, in Philadelphia and raised in Easton, Pennsylvania. He graduated from Lafayette College in 1952. His father, Arthur Lipson, was a co-owner of a former Chamber of commerce publication named Greater Philadelphia.

== Career ==
He joined his father's publication Greater Philadelphia in 1952 as an advertisement salesman. He became publisher in 1963, the owner in 1968, and changed the publication's name to Philadelphia. In 1967, the magazine developed a reputation for investigative journalism with an expose written by Gaeton Fonzi on The Philadelphia Inquirer journalist Harry Karafin for accepting bribes from subjects to not publish negative articles about them. By the end of the 1960s, the magazine had a circulation of 70,000.

He repeated the formula in Boston with the purchase of another Chamber of commerce publication in 1971 which he named Boston. He launched Manhattan, inc. in 1984. It had a male, high-income clientele. In 1985 it had a circulation of 55,000 and won a National Magazine Award for general excellence. He briefly owned the Atlanta magazine. He served as the executive chairman of Metrocorp Publishing.

He died December 25, 2017, in Philadelphia and was interred at West Laurel Hill Cemetery in Bala Cynwyd, Pennsylvania.

== Personal life ==
He was married three times and had a son and two daughters. He had homes in Margate, New Jersey, and Naples, Florida. His son David was CEO of Metrocorp Publishing.

In 2019, his wife Carol Lipson sued Metrocorp for $1.6 million for failure to make payment under the terms of a prenuptial agreement between her and D. Herbert Lipson.
