= Depletion (accounting) =

Reduction of the quantity of natural resources

Depletion is an accounting and tax concept used most often in the mining, timber, and petroleum industries. It is similar to depreciation in that it is a cost recovery system for accounting and tax reporting: "The depletion deduction" allows an owner or operator to account for the reduction of a product's reserves.

== Types of depletion ==
For tax purposes, the two types of depletion are percentage depletion and cost depletion.

For mineral property, the method leading to the largest deduction is generally used. For standing timber, use of the cost depletion method is required.

Depletion, for both accounting purposes and United States tax purposes, is a method of recording the gradual expense or use of natural resources over time. Depletion is the using up of natural resources by mining, quarrying, drilling, or felling.

According to the IRS Newswire, over 50 percent of oil and gas extraction businesses use cost depletion to figure their depletion deduction. Mineral property includes oil and gas wells, mines, and other natural resource deposits (including geothermal deposits). For that purpose, property is each separate interest businesses own in each mineral deposit in each separate tract or parcel of land. Businesses can treat two or more separate interests as one property or as separate properties.

=== Percentage depletion ===
To figure percentage depletion, a certain percentage, specified for each mineral, is multiplied by gross income from the property during the tax year. The rates to be used and other conditions and qualifications for oil and gas wells are discussed below under Independent Producers and Royalty Owners and under Natural Gas Wells. Rates and other rules for percentage depletion of other specific minerals are found later in Mines and Geothermal Deposits.

=== Cost depletion ===
Cost depletion is an accounting method by which costs of natural resources are allocated to depletion over the period that make up the life of the asset. Cost depletion is computed by estimating the total quantity of mineral or other resources acquired and assigning a proportionate amount of the total resource cost to the quantity extracted in the period. For example, assume Big Texas Oil, Co. had discovered a large reserve of oil and estimates that the oil well will produce 200,000 barrels of oil. If the company invests $100,000 to extract the oil and extracts 10,000 barrels the first year, the depletion deduction is $5,000 ($100,000 X 10,000/200,000).

Cost depletion for tax purposes may be completely different from cost depletion for accounting purposes:

$$CD = S/(R+S) \times AB = AB/(R+S) \times S$$
CD = Cost Depletion.
S = Units sold in the current year
R = Reserves on hand at the end of the current year
AB = Adjusted basis of the property at the end of the current year

== Accounting ==
Adjusted basis is the basis at end of year adjusted for prior years depletion in cost or percentage. It automatically allows for adjustments to the basis during the taxable year.

By using the units remaining at the end of the year, the adjustment allows for revised estimates of the reserves.

Depletion is based upon sales and not production. Units are considered sold in the year the proceeds are taxable under the taxpayer's accounting method.

== Reserves ==
Reserves generally include proven developed reserves and "probable" or "prospective" reserves if there is reasonable evidence to have believed that such quantities existed at that time.

== Example ==
If producer X has capitalized costs on property A of $40,000, originally consisting of the lease bonus, capitalized exploration costs, and some capitalized carrying costs, and the lease has been producing for several years and during this time, X has claimed $10,000 of allowable depletion. In 2009, X's share of production sold was 40,000 barrels and an engineer's report indicated that 160,000 barrels could be recovered after December 31, 2009.

The calculation of cost depletion for this lease would be as follows:

Cost depletion = S/(R+S) × AB or AB/(R+S) × S
CD = 40,000/(40,000 + 160,000) × ($40,000 − $10,000)
= 40,000/200,000 × $30,000
= $6,000

== See also ==
- Depreciation
- Amortization (accounting)
- Oil depletion allowance
