= Da Vinci Science Center =

Science museum in Allentown, Pennsylvania

Coordinates: 40.58394°N 75.52207°W

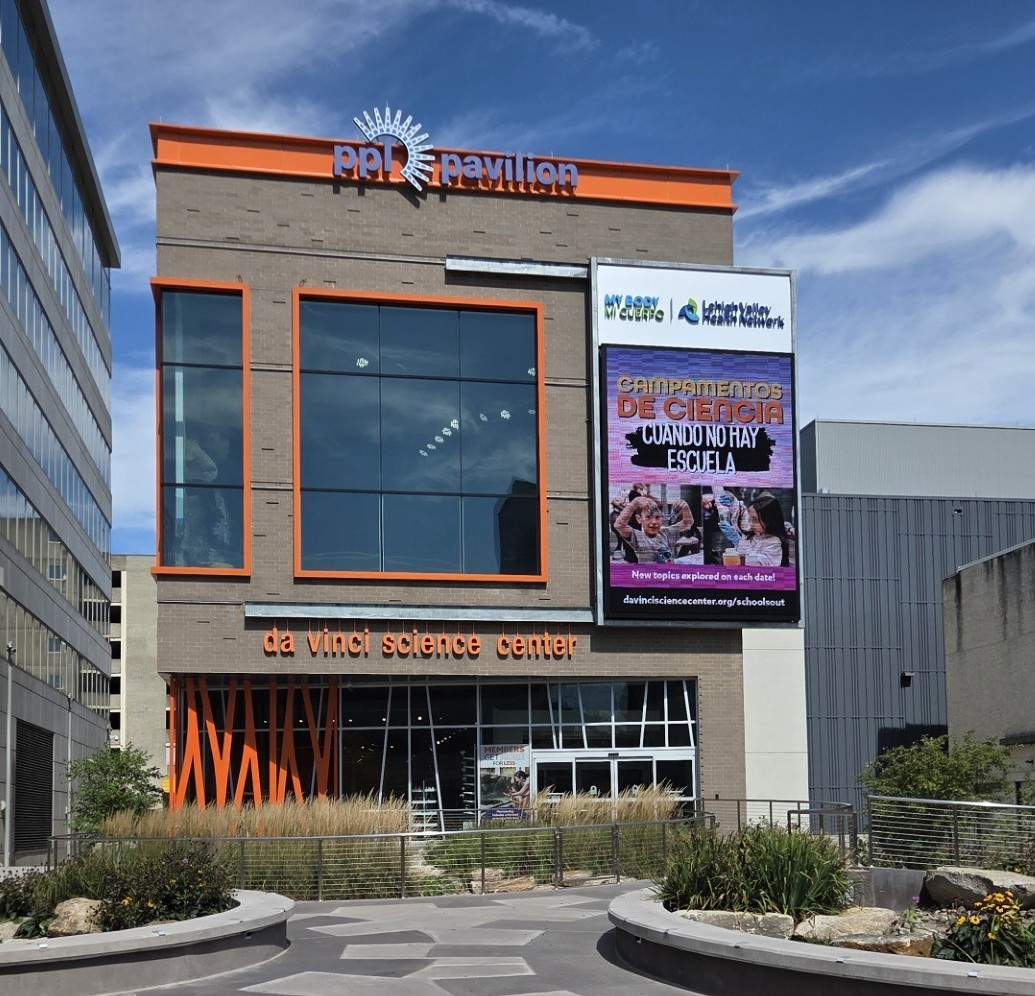
- Da Vinci Science Center in Allentown, Pennsylvania in September, 2025.

- Location within Pennsylvania Location within the United States
- Established: 2003
- Location: 815 W. Hamilton Street, Allentown, Pennsylvania, U.S.
- Type: Science, Technology, Careers, Children
- Accreditation: ASTC, NSF
- Visitors: 150,000 participants annually
- Director: Lin Erickson
- Public transit access: LANta Bus: 102, 211
- Website: DaVinci Science Center

The Da Vinci Science Center (DSC) is a science museum and nonprofit organization in Allentown, Pennsylvania. The earliest iteration of the center was created in 1992. The center's mission statement is "to bring science to life and lives to science."

DSC focuses on connecting people of all ages to science. Its interactive experiences include a two-story exhibit floor, nearly three-dozen programs for visitors of all ages, students, educators, and community groups, and regional workforce initiatives that integrate limited-engagement exhibits with programs highlighting workforce development opportunities. The center's primary focus is introducing children to the potential of the STEM-related subjects.

The Da Vinci Science Center is located in Pennsylvania's Lehigh Valley, approximately 48 miles (77 km) north-northwest of Philadelphia and 78 miles (126 km) west of New York City.

== History ==
The earliest incarnation of the DSC was as the Science Model Area Resource Team (SMART) Center at Lehigh University in Bethlehem, Pennsylvania created in 1992. Its primary purpose was originally to host interactive JASON Project broadcasts for students featuring Robert Ballard, the oceanographer who discovered the wreckage of the RMS Titanic.

The success of SMART Center public programing events encouraged Lehigh University and its partners to open a dedicated public visitor experience in a former Bethlehem Steel building in 1995 called the SMART Discovery Center. The new center quickly expanded to a larger, nearby building in 1997 and ceased its original JASON Project broadcasts in 1998.

The Discovery Center separated from Lehigh University in July 1999 and became a small, grass-roots organization that served school field trips for grades K-8 primarily and had limited exhibit and program engagement. In July 2003, the Discovery Center of Science and Technology merged with Leonardo da Vinci's Horse, Inc. This combined organization became known as the Da Vinci Science Center. With the merger, the center began to emphasize connecting science and technology to the arts and other disciplines.

In June 2005, the center moved to a custom-built exhibit building on land it leased from Cedar Crest College in Allentown. The expanded and modernized visitor experience was designed for a deeper emphasis on public visitation, expanding the organization's reach throughout the greater Lehigh Valley region and developing programs for other age groups.

In 2016, the Da Vinci Science Center and the city of Easton, Pennsylvania signed a one-year memorandum of understanding to explore the possibility of opening up a $130 million space on the city's waterfront area. The construction for this project would have taken place on the properties along South Third Street and Larry Holmes Drive. This would have required the purchase and removal of a Day's Inn on the premises. Da Vinci Science City was planned to feature traveling exhibit galleries shared with the main Allentown location, and would additionally host an aquarium restaurant, large screen theater, and event center. In 2019, DSC's CEO Lin Ericson announced that the organization would not build in Easton and would look elsewhere.

In late 2019, DSC announced plans to build a new, state-of-the-art facility in downtown Allentown. DSC broke ground on April 22, 2022 at the building site of their new location, funded in part by an $11 million investment from the state of Pennsylvania. The new center officially opened to the public on May 22, 2024.

== Current Exhibits ==
The current DSC building is divided into six main areas, each with their own exhibits and activities.

=== Lehigh Valley Health Network "My Body" ===
The My Body exhibit explores the human body through a variety of activities and exhibits. Guests can explore a two-story immersive body where they are able to climb through intestines, feel a heartbeat, and see emotions in the brain. There are exhibits on the body's senses, medical technology, and public health.

=== Lehigh River Watershed: Explore Nature Nearby ===
The Lehigh River Watershed exhibit space brings guests into simulated environments that can be found in the local watershed. Guests explore a limestone cavern adorned with stalagmites and stalactites; the Pocono Ravine, home to four North American River Otters; the pond tank, full of local fish and turtle species; the river tank, which holds the center's brook trout; and an upland forest enclosure holding two eastern box turtles and black rat snake.

=== Science in the Making ===
Science in the Making is themed around the science behind engineering and the processes that go into manufacturing local products. Exhibits include a display on Martin Guitar production, interactive die cut and corrugation machines, a controllable hydraulic dinosaur, and tesla coil. Also in this exhibit is the ATAS Innovation Studio, a craft space that encourages guests to create their own project with provided materials.

=== Curiosity Hall ===
Curiosity Hall consists of a 50-foot projection screen and multiple touch-screen kiosks. Guests can use the kiosks to interact with the projection screen, creating their own objects that appear on the screen. Current programs include: "Create a Self Portrait", "Design a Flying Machine", and "Make a Fit Kid."

=== City Center Gallery ===
City Center Gallery is the home for travelling exhibits at DSC. Exhibits hosted in this space have included "Dinos Alive: Immersive Experience", "Sharks", and "Mission Astronaut."

=== Science Theater ===
Science theater is a multi-purpose show space where DSC staff perform various live science shows and demonstrations. Some prior programming included: "The Scoop on Ice Cream", a live show about the process of making ice cream with samples; "Use the Force" a show/demonstration on the laws of motion; and regular surprise animal chats where animal care staff talk about one of the center's ambassador animals.

== Past exhibits ==
=== Cedar Crest College location ===
Exhibits at the Center's 2005-2024 location on Cedar Crest College campus included:

==== Engineers on a Roll ====
A combined engineering lab, playscape, and climbing space that offers students active fun while they explore math and engineering.

==== Tunnel Experience ====
One of the Da Vinci Science Center's most popular exhibits was the tunnel. Visitors learn how to hone their observational skills by using senses, other than vision, as they crawl through a 72-foot-long tunnel in complete darkness.

==== Physics Playground ====
Students take a hands-on approach to learning about forces, motion, and simple machines.

==== Animation Station ====
Here visitors learn the basics behind animation, including how still frame images are compiled together to create a continuous video. They get the opportunity to make their own stop-motion film by moving objects around while a computer captures photos of each scene and compiles them into a final product.

==== Built Like a Mack Truck ====
This video-game like exhibit has visitors develop virtual green trucks that are fuel-efficient and don't produce excessive waste. During the design process, they select elements like tire tread, horsepower and fuel source, which ultimately impact how the simulation performs while maneuvering through virtual obstacles.

==== Deer Park Water Table ====
The Deer Park Water Table is designed specifically for preschool-aged children and sits less than four feet above the ground. The exhibit features movable parts that visitors can position to change the flow of water. Visitors learn about water use, conservation, and the importance of healthy hydration.

==== Hurricane Simulator ====
Inside this attraction, guests experience what it would be like to be inside a Category 1 hurricane as the wind races past them at speeds of up to 78 miles per hour.

==== Invent-a-Car ====
This exhibit lets young children try their hand at designing a car from plastic parts.

==== Da Vinci Pond ====
The Da Vinci Pond is a 560-gallon tank, lit by LED lights that gives visitors a chance to view aquatic species indigenous to the area, including a painted turtle and several fish species.

==== Nano Exhibits ====
Nanotechnology refers to studying objects that are only a few atoms wide. At the center's Nano Exhibits, visitors learn the basic behind this field and get a glimpse at how it is used in the modern world. Visitors also get to apply what they learn themselves, building large replicas of carbon nanotubes and a feature the center calls "Balance Our Nano Future".

==== Newton Chairs ====
The Newton Chairs are chairs that roll back when visitors push each other. The simple design illustrates Newton's second law of motion – if two visitors apply the same force to each other (push each other), then the difference in their mass will create a proportional difference in their acceleration. In other words, if child does this with their parent, the child will travel back much faster because the same force input is acting against a smaller mass.

== Leadership ==
=== Board of Trustees ===
The Da Vinci Science Center is overseen by a board of trustees charged with ensuring the center functions consistent with the center's mission and is properly funded. The board of trustees also is responsible for electing the chief executive officer. The board consists of 28 members who meet quarterly.

The board of trustees has four committees, the Executive Committee, the Audit Finance Committee, the Governance and Nominating Committee and the Human Resources Committee, that meet throughout the year.

=== Chief Executive Officer ===
The chief executive officer of Da Vinci Science Center is Lin Erickson, who is in this role for the second time after being rehired for the position in 2013, having been CEO from 1997 to 2005. In 2005, she moved to Ohio but returned to Pennsylvania and the Da Vinci Science Center in March 2013. During her time in Ohio, Erickson worked for both the Air Force Museum Foundation and Wittenberg University. From 2005 until 2013, the CEO was Troy A. Thrash. In 2013, Erickson returned as CEO. Thrash, in turn, moved to become the president and CEO of Air Zoo museum in Portage, Michigan, an affiliate of the Smithsonian Institution.
