= Discount Drug Mart =

Drug store chain

Discount Drug Mart, Inc.
- Company type: Private
- Industry: Retail, Pharmacy
- Founded: 1969
- Founder: Parviz Boodjeh
- Headquarters: Medina, Ohio
- Number of locations: 78 (2023)
- Key people: Parviz Boodjeh, RPh
- Website: discount-drugmart.com

Discount Drug Mart, Inc., is a northeast Ohio based drug store chain. Its first store opened in Elyria, Ohio in 1969 by Parviz Boodjeh, RPh.

== History ==
In 1969, Parviz Boodjeh established the first Discount Drug Mart in Elyria, Ohio. The store originally filled prescriptions, and sold toiletries, grocery, and gift items.

In the early 1980s, Boodjeh began standardizing the merchandise offerings and commissioned an architect to develop a store design on which all Discount Drug stores would be based. A 22,000-square-foot (2,000 m^{2}) model was produced and adopted, and this design was later modified and enlarged to 24,000 square feet (2,200 m^{2}).

Discount Drug Mart expanded across Ohio through the 1990s.

In August 2015, MetroHealth partnered with Discount Drug Mart and opened its first primary care clinic in a Discount Drug Mart location.

In January 2020, the company announced the expansion of its partnership with the MetroHealth System, adding more clinics to its stores across Ohio.

Discount Drug Mart is now employee owned and operated and has welcomed its 78th store located in Columbiana, Ohio in September 2024.
