= Harry Karafin =

American investigative journalist (1915–1973)

Harry J. Karafin (September 4, 1915 – October 23, 1973) was an American investigative journalist associated with The Philadelphia Inquirer. He was a reporter at the Inquirer for 24 years (having worked his way up from copyboy, beginning in 1939), and in the 1950s and 1960s was considered the paper's star reporter as well as the city's best-known journalist, known for exposing corruption (partly through privileged access to district attorney files). Together with a colleague, Karafin was one of three finalists for the 1965 Pulitzer Prize for Local Investigative Specialized Reporting.

He was dismissed in 1967 after a Philadelphia magazine article exposed his willingness to accept payment from potential reporting subjects in order to avoid negative coverage. Karafin was convicted on 40 counts of blackmail and corrupt solicitation in 1968 and sentenced to 4-to-9 years; he was additionally convicted of perjury in 1971 in relation to statements in the 1968 trial, with a concurrent 2- to 7-year sentence. The perjury conviction was overturned by the Superior Court of Pennsylvania. Harry died in prison in 1973.
