= William F. Curtis Arboretum =

Arboretum in Allentown, Pennsylvania, United States

Coordinates: 40.58687°N 75.51508°W

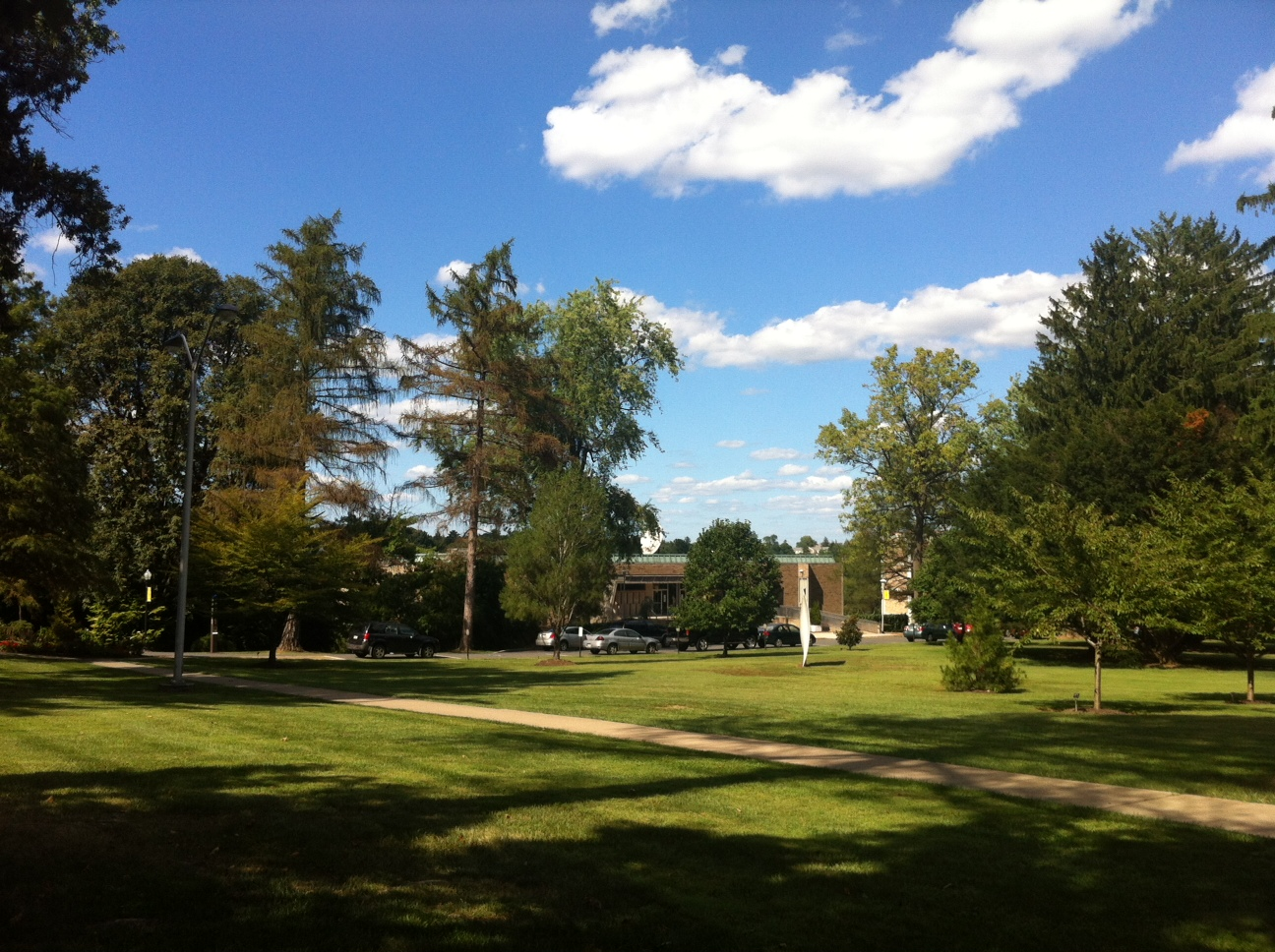
- Interactive map of William F. Curtis Arboretum
- Type: Arboretum
- Location: Allentown, Pennsylvania
- Area: 84 acres (34 ha)
- Website: Official website

William F. Curtis Arboretum, sometimes called Curtis Arboretum, is a 84 acres (34 ha) arboretum located on the campus of Cedar Crest College in Allentown, Pennsylvania. The arboretum contains more than 140 varieties of trees, shrubs, and flowering bushes.

== History ==
The arboretum began in 1915 when the college, at that time called the Allentown College for Women, moved to its current location from downtown Allentown. At the time, the campus was a cornfield with a single black walnut tree.

William F. Curtis, a minister and the college's seventh president, would not accept fees for speaking engagements, but instead welcomed donations of trees, shrubs, and flowering bushes for planting on campus. The original black walnut tree was destroyed in a violent storm on August 11, 1983. The campus was officially certified as an arboretum by the American Association of Botanical Gardens and Arboreta in 1985.

== Collection ==
- Acer palmatum
- Betula pendula
- Euonymus alatus
- Ginkgo biloba
- Platanus × hispanica
- Prunus serrulata

== Admission ==
The arboretum is open daily, and there is no fee for admission.

== See also ==
- List of botanical gardens and arboretums in the United States
- List of historic places in Allentown, Pennsylvania
