= Municipal Band of Allentown =

American concert band

The Municipal Band of Allentown is an American civilian concert band based in Allentown, Pennsylvania. The band was established in 1923 as the Allentown Police Band, which was renamed to the Municipal Band of Allentown in 1941.

The Municipal Band of Allentown performs a number of times each year in a number of venues, which include concerts at West Park and other locations throughout Allentown and the Lehigh Valley. The Municipal Band is part of Allentown's rich musical heritage of civilian concert bands, which also includes the Allentown Band, the Pioneer Band of Allentown and the Marine Band of Allentown.
