= Haveli (novel) =

1993 novel by Suzanne Fisher Staples

- First edition cover (publ. Knopf)
- Author: Suzanne Fisher Staples
- Publisher: Knopf
- Publication date: September 1, 1993
- ISBN: 0-679-84157-1

Haveli: A Young Woman's Courageous Struggle for Freedom in Present-day Pakistan is a 1993 novel by American children's author Suzanne Fisher Staples. It is the sequel to the 1989 book, Shabanu, Daughter of the Wind, also by Suzanne Fisher Staples. Haveli shows the ups and downs of Shabanu's new life as an 18-year-old mother.

== Plot ==
Shabanu (age 18) has many external and internal conflicts to face. She has a daughter named Mumtaz and she is the love of Shabanu's life. It has been years since Shabanu was with her family, and married to an older, very powerful clan leader named Rahim, Shabanu longs for the freedom that she no longer has. Although Rahim adores Shabanu, his youngest wife, he still fails to protect her and her daughter Mumtaz from the pampered women in his household who despise Shabanu for her youth and for her influence over Rahim. As Shabanu slowly plans a better life for herself and her daughter, they know they will not be welcome in the family home at Okurabad, after Rahim's death. After a visit to the haveli – Rahim’s home, in the ancient city of Lahore – a sequence of events start that threatens Shabanu’s plans, and even her life. In the haveli, she falls totally and unexpectedly in love with someone who is as bound by tradition as she is.

== Main characters ==
- Shabanu
- Mumtaz
- Rahim
- Zabo
- Ahmed
- Amina
- Ibne
- Nazir
- Dadi
- Leyla
- Selma
- Samiya

== Reception ==
Kirkus Reviews writes, "Again, Staples imbues Shabanu and her beautiful, brutally repressive world with a splendid reality that transcends the words on the page." According to LibrisNotes, "Once again Suzanne Staples writing makes accessible and real, the unique cultural life of a small part of Pakistan."
