= The Shoppes at Trexler =

- Location: Trexlertown, Pennsylvania, U.S.
- Coordinates: 40.5499°N 75.5923°W
- Opened: 1973
- Manager: Cedar Realty Trust
- Owner: Cedar Realty Trust
- Num. of stores: 21
- Floor area: 337,297 sq ft (31,335.9 m^{2})
- Floors: 1

The Shoppes at Trexler, formerly Trexler Mall, is an open-air shopping center and former enclosed community shopping mall in Trexlertown, Pennsylvania.

== History ==
=== 20th century ===
The Trexler Mall opened in 1973. It was not immediately successful, partly because it was built before the surrounding suburbs had developed sufficiently. Over time, however, the mall became more popular and successful. Its original anchors were a Grant City discount store, a Laneco department store (signed as LANE), and an A&P Food Market.

Three years after opening, Grant City closed as part of the W.T. Grant company's bankruptcy liquidation in 1976. The former Grant City was then leased to Hess's Department Stores of Allentown. Business in the mall was hurt in 1985 due to a weeks-long strike by Laneco employees.

The next major change occurred in 1988, when A&P switched banners into a Super Fresh grocery store. Super Fresh later closed in 1993 due to "extremely poor sales" that were attributed to competition from a much newer and larger Redner's Warehouse Market that had opened down the street in 1990.

In 1994, what remained of the Hess's department store chain was sold off. Hess's trademarks and most of its remaining stores, including the Trexler Mall location, were purchased by The Bon-Ton Stores, Inc of York, PA and were rebranded with the Bon-Ton name in 1995. By 1995, the Lane department store at Trexler Mall had closed, leaving Bon-Ton as the only anchor tenant. That same year, however, Giant food stores signed a 20-year lease and began demolishing the former Super Fresh store; a brand new Giant supermarket opened at the site in 1996. The former site of Lane became home to a flea market for some time, then by 2002 it had been leased out to the Health Center at Trexlertown, which is part of the Lehigh Valley Health Network.

=== 21st century ===
In 2002, the owners of the mall sought approval from local officials to redevelop much of the mall interior to make way for a new Kohl's department store, with a lawyer for the mall owners declaring "We're going through, as the professionals like to say, the de-malling of the Trexler Mall". Over the course of the next year, the Kohl's opened and the remainder of the mall was converted into a strictly open-air strip mall called The Shoppes at Trexler. In 2011, Giant supermarket left the Shoppes at Trexler to open a new facility adjacent to the former mall. Marshalls opened in the former Giant in 2012, though the space was later subdivided so that half would remain Marshalls while the other half became HomeGoods.

On January 31, 2018, it was announced that The Bon-Ton would be closing as part of a plan to close 42 stores nationwide. The store closed in April 2018. Until it was repainted in early 2018, a water tower behind the plaza remained painted with the words "Trexler Mall" despite the fact that the mall had been defunct for about 15 years prior.

In 2020, the former site of The Bon-Ton will become Urban Air Adventure Park, an indoor amusement park.

== Mall facts ==
- The Trexler Mall had a unique L-shape; the enclosed mall spanned between the original anchors Grant City and Laneco, while a section of outdoor strip mall connected Grant City to A&P at an irregular angle.
- The former mall apparently has three different names. While the pylon sign for the plaza refers to it as "The Shoppes at Trexler", the water tower behind the mall that formerly read "Trexler Mall" was repainted in 2018 and now reads "The Shops at Trexlertown". Meanwhile, the owners of the property, Cedar Realty Trust, continue to list the property as the "Trexler Mall" on their portfolio.
- Laneco, a local chain of stores in eastern Pennsylvania and New Jersey, typically operated stores that functioned as a combination of both a department store and a food market. However, the Lane department store at the Trexler Mall was a rare instance of a Laneco store that lacked a food market, likely due to the presence of A&P at the same mall.
- The Trexler Mall Coin Laundry, currently located in the rear of the shopping center, has been a tenant in the mall since 1981.
- The Trexler Mall was one of only two malls in the Lehigh Valley area that permitted smoking inside by 1995; the other was the Richland Mall of Quakertown. Coincidentally, the Richland Mall has also since been converted to a strictly open-air shopping plaza.
