= Marine Band of Allentown =

Concert band in Pennsylvania, US

The Marine Band of Allentown is a civilian concert band based in Allentown, Pennsylvania. Founded 1903, the band played over 130 engagements during its first year.

Despite its name, the Marine Band has no affiliation to the military or the United States Marine Corps. Today, the Marine Band performs a number of times each year in a number of venues, which include annual spring and Christmas concerts, West Park, the Festival of Bands, Mayfair and other locations throughout Allentown and the Lehigh Valley. The Marine Band is part of Allentown's rich musical heritage of civilian concert bands, which also includes the Allentown Band, the Municipal Band of Allentown and the Pioneer Band of Allentown.
