= Haveli, Pune =

Haveli Haveli, Pune
- Town
- Country: India
- State: Maharashtra
- District: Pune

Languages
  - Official: Marathi
- Time zone: UTC+5:30 (IST)
- Vehicle registration: MH-12
- City: Pune
- Lok Sabha constituency: Pune

Haveli is a taluka (Sub-division) of Pune district in the Indian state of Maharashtra.
