= Das Awkscht Fescht =

Car show in Macungie, Pennsylvania

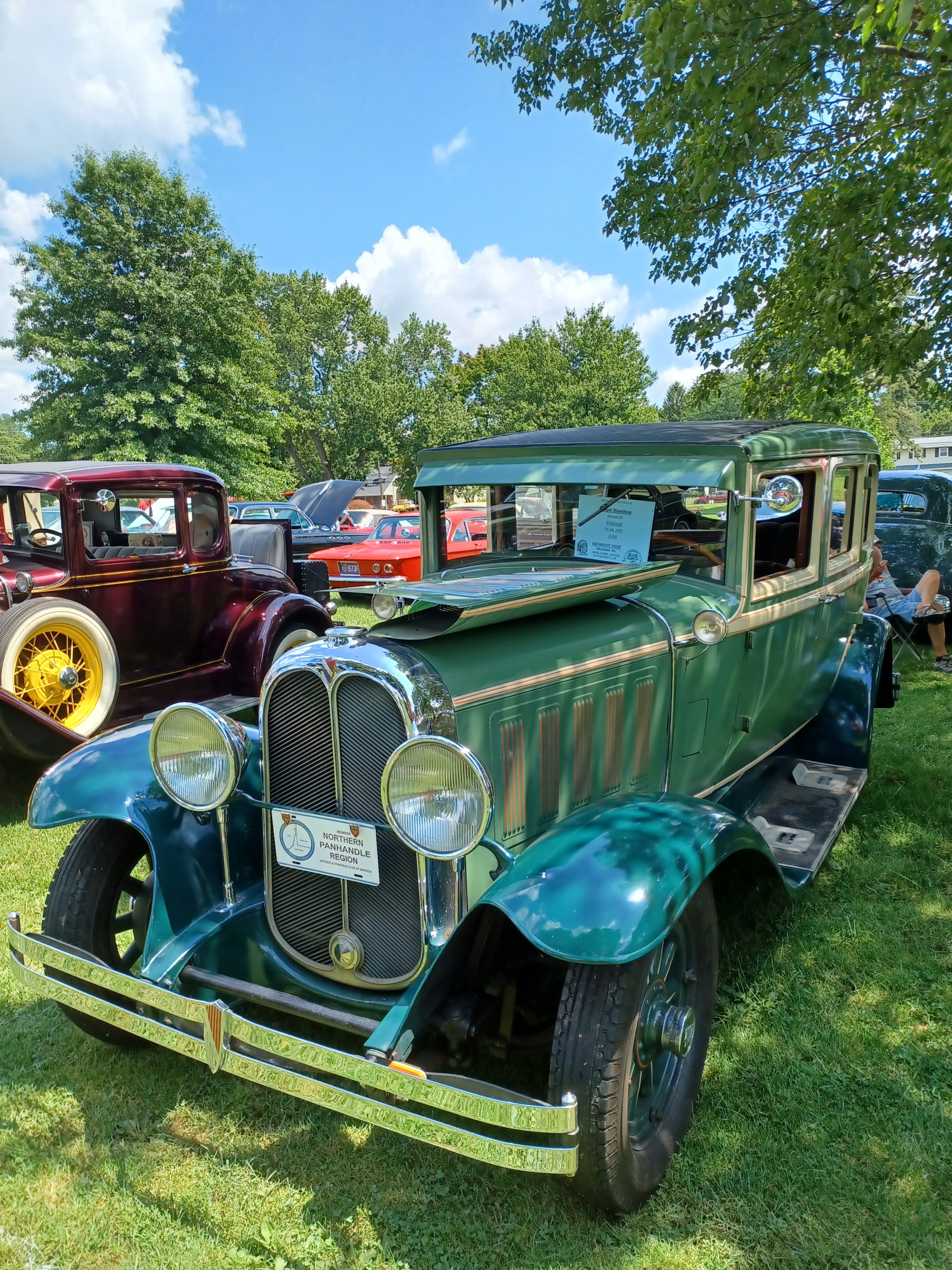
- A 1929 Oakland at the Fescht, 2026
- Status: Active
- Genre: Auto show
- Frequency: Annually
- Venue: Macungie Memorial Park
- Location: Macungie, Pennsylvania
- Years active: 1964–present
- Website: awkscht.com

Das Awkscht Fescht is an American antique and classic car show held in Macungie, Pennsylvania. The three-day show takes place annually on the first weekend in August, hence the name: Awkscht is Pennsylvania Dutch for August, and Fescht means festival. The first Awkscht Fescht was held in 1964..

The show is considered one of the country's largest events of its type. Besides cars and motorcycles, visitors will find flea markets, food, toy shows, arts and crafts (including quilts). Live music events are conducted daily. The Fescht takes place on the 42-acre grounds of the Macungie Memorial Park. There is a public swimming pool in the center of the park.
