= Oil depletion allowance =

Tax Loophole

The oil depletion allowance in American (US) tax law is a tax break claimable by anyone with an economic interest in a mineral deposit or standing timber. The principle is that the asset is a capital investment that is a wasting asset, and therefore depreciation can reasonably be offset (effectively as a capital loss) against income.

The allowance encouraged people who were taxed at a high marginal rate to invest in, perhaps risky, oil ventures. If the venture failed, then the costs would effectively reduce income, so the effective loss at a 90% marginal rate would only be 10% of the actual investment. Conversely if the venture was successful, an amount up to initial investment (under cost depletion, see below) would be tax free. Under the percentage depletion method the amount could potentially be even greater.

The oil depletion allowance has been subject of interest because one method (percentage depletion) of claiming the allowance makes it possible to write off more than the whole capital cost of the asset.

== Depletion calculation ==
Two methods of depletion calculations are available, detailed regulations determine which can be used, but in some circumstances the asset owner can choose.

=== Cost depletion ===
With this method the original investment is effectively amortized over the productive life of the asset, starting with the original capital investment, the annual percentage being the percentage of the reserves at the beginning of the year that are sold in the course of the year. The amortized amount is deducted from the net income before calculating taxes. The total amount deducted by this method cannot exceed the original value of the capital invested.

=== Percentage depletion ===
With this method, a fixed percentage of the gross income is treated as deductible. The percentage is dependent on the nature of the resource being extracted. It is possible under this scheme for the total deductibles (or indeed the annual deductible) to exceed the original capital investment.

==== Table of percentages ====
The following percentages are prescribed by the Internal Revenue Code, section 613(b).

Paragraph	Percentage	Resources
1	22%	(A) sulphur and uranium; and (B) if from deposits in the United States—anorthosite, clay, laterite, and nephelite syenite (to the extent that alumina and aluminum compounds are extracted from it), asbestos, bauxite, celestite, chromite, corundum, fluorspar, graphite, ilmenite, kyanite, mica, olivine, quartz crystals (radio grade), rutile, block steatite talc, and zircon, and ores of the following metals: antimony, beryllium, bismuth, cadmium, cobalt, columbium, lead, lithium, manganese, mercury, molybdenum, nickel, platinum and platinum group metals, tantalum, thorium, tin, titanium, tungsten, vanadium, and zinc.
2	15%	If from deposits in the United States— (A) gold, silver, copper, and iron ore, and (B) oil shale (except shale described in paragraph (5)).
3	14%	(A) metal mines (if paragraph (1)(B) or (2)(A) does not apply), rock asphalt, and vermiculite; and (B) if paragraph (1)(B), (5), or (6)(B) does not apply, ball clay, bentonite, china clay, sagger clay, and clay used or sold for use for purposes dependent on its refractory properties.
4	10%	Asbestos (if paragraph (1)(B) does not apply), brucite, coal, lignite, perlite, sodium chloride, and wollastonite.
5	7.5%	Clay and shale used or sold for use in the manufacture of sewer pipe or brick, and clay, shale, and slate used or sold for use as sintered or burned lightweight aggregates.
6	5%	(A) gravel, peat, pumice, sand, scoria, shale (except shale described in paragraph (2)(B) or (5)), and stone (except stone described in paragraph (7)); (B) clay used, or sold for use, in the manufacture of drainage and roofing tile, flower pots, and kindred products; and (C) if from brine wells — bromine, calcium chloride, and magnesium chloride.
7	14%	All other minerals, including, but not limited to, aplite, barite, borax, calcium carbonates, diatomaceous earth, dolomite, feldspar, Fuller's earth, garnet, gilsonite, granite, limestone, magnesite, magnesium carbonates, marble, mollusk shells (including clam shells and oyster shells), phosphate rock, potash, quartzite, slate, soapstone, stone (used or sold for use by the mine owner or operator as dimension stone or ornamental stone), thenardite, tripoli, trona, and (if paragraph (1)(B) does not apply) bauxite, flake graphite, fluorspar, lepidolite, mica, spodumene, and talc (including pyrophyllite), except that, unless sold on bid in direct competition with a bona fide bid to sell a mineral listed in paragraph (3), the percentage shall be 5 percent for any such other mineral (other than slate to which paragraph (5) applies) when used, or sold for use, by the mine owner or operator as rip rap, ballast, road material, rubble, concrete aggregates, or for similar purposes. For purposes of this paragraph, the term "all other minerals" does not include— (A) soil, sod, dirt, turf, water, or mosses; (B) minerals from sea water, the air, or similar inexhaustible sources; or (C) oil and gas wells.

For geothermal assets the rate is 15%

==== Limits ====
For independent producers or royalty owners of oil and gas, the deduction for percentage depletion is limited to the smaller of:

- The taxable mineral income from the property figured without the deduction for depletion and the deduction for domestic production activities under section 199 of the Internal Revenue Code.
- 65% of the taxpayer's gross taxable income from all sources.

Amounts not deductible due to the 65% limit can be carried forward.

== Impact ==
Over the nine decades of its existence since 1916, the oil depletion allowance has benefitted oil companies and the petrochemical industry by more than $470 billion as of 2014, everything else being equal.

== Proposals for repeal, and reduction in size and applicability ==
Several attempts have been advanced to repeal the allowance tax loophole. U.S. Secretary of the Treasury Henry Morgenthau in 1937 declared the depletion allowance “perhaps the most glaring loophole” in the tax code. US President Franklin D. Roosevelt decried it and other tax-avoidance stratagems by business as “so widespread and so amazing, both in their boldness and their ingenuity, that further action without delay seems imperative.” The US Congress refused to abolish the allowance.

Similarly, President Harry S. Truman unsuccessfully proposed repealing the allowance. In Congress in 1969 there was a cut in the depletion allowance from 27.5% to 23%, despite objections from Gulf Oil's president. As of 2014 it was 15%.

In 1975 Gerald Ford signed a tax bill that repealed the allowance for large companies.

In 2005 George W. Bush signed the Energy Policy Act of 2005, expanding the allowance to more drillers.

== Sources ==
This article uses text from Internal Revenue Code, Section 613(b), and Publication 535 (2013), Business Expenses which are in the Public Domain as works of the US Federal Government
