= Cedar Crest College =

Private women's college in Allentown, Pennsylvania, US

Coordinates: 40.587°N 75.519°W

- Former names: Lehigh Female Academy (1867–1868); Allentown Female College (1868–1893); Allentown College for Women (1893–1913)
- Motto: Religio, Libertas et Scientia (Latin)
- Motto in English: Divinity, Liberty and Knowledge
- Type: Private liberal arts women's college
- Established: July 12, 1867; 159 years ago
- Religious affiliation: United Church of Christ (historically related)
- Academic affiliations: LVAIC
- Endowment: $41.5 million (2022)
- President: Elizabeth M. Meade
- Faculty: 92 full-time
- Students: 1,248 (fall 2023)
- Undergraduates: 886 (fall 2023)
- Postgraduates: 362 (fall 2023)
- Location: Allentown, Pennsylvania, United States
- Campus: Suburban, 84 acres (34 ha)
- Colors: (Black, gold, and white)
- Nickname: Falcons
- Website: cedarcrest.edu

Cedar Crest College is a private liberal arts women's college in Allentown, Pennsylvania. In the fall of 2024, the college enrolled 886 undergraduate and 362 graduate students. Students of all genders can pursue degree programs through the School of Adult and Graduate Education (SAGE) at the undergraduate and graduate level.

== History ==
=== Lehigh Female Academy ===
Following discussions in the Zion Reformed Church in 1866 to establish a seminary for women, the church appointed a committee of five members to investigate the matter. At the annual meeting of the East Pennsylvania Classis at the Zion Reformed Church the following year, members discussed a proposal set forth by neighboring Muhlenberg College recommending the need to establish an institution to serve women.

=== Allentown Female College ===
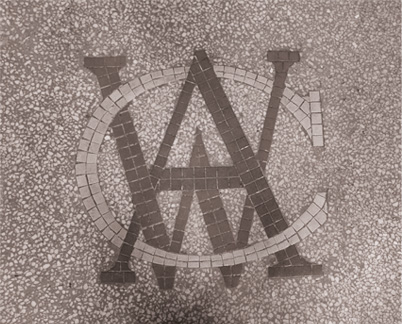
Fresco of the logo of the Allentown College for Women

The college moved in 1868 after having outgrown its former location. The academy bought Robert Emmett Wright's Clover Nook Estate in Allentown and changed its name to the Allentown Female College.

In 1872, the Cedar Crest Alumnae Association was founded; it later registered as a non-profit in 1933. In 1884, the campus was expanded to include 25 rooms, a gym, library, art room, and a chapel. The school was renamed to the "Allentown College for Women" in 1893.

=== Cedar Crest College ===
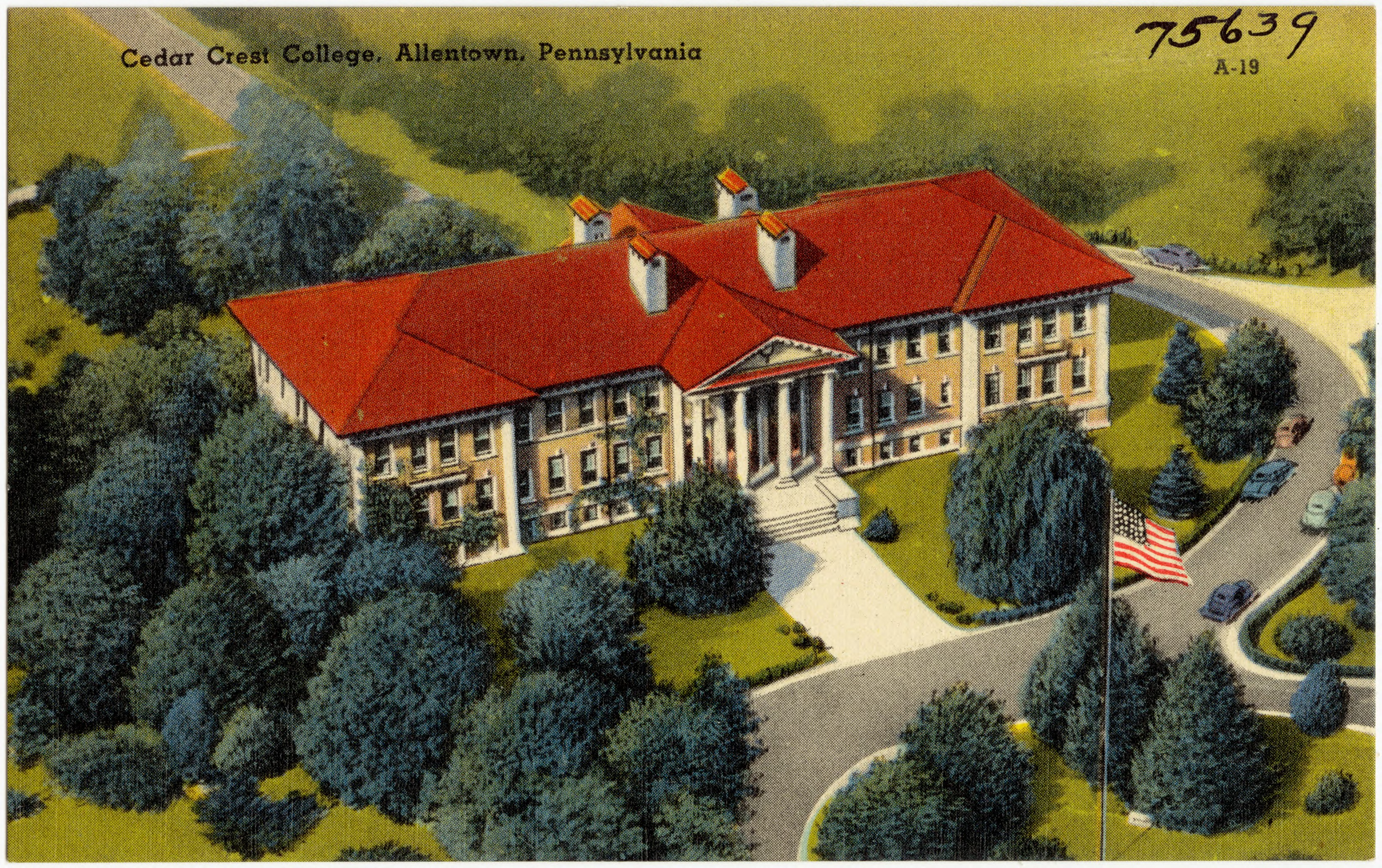
Aerial view of the college in the 1930s

On June 4, 1913, the school would move again, this time to its present location. It again changed its name, this time to Cedar Crest College. Classes began on the new campus on September 29, 1915.

In 1927, the Allen House was built as the president's residence. The building was later transformed into a library and administrative building. The Allen House was named in honor of college supporters and alumnae William and Roberta Ritter Allen, class of 1936.

In 2001, the school picked the falcon as its mascot, replacing the old team name the "Classics". Two years later, Cedar Crest began offering graduate courses and degrees with an MBA program that would be expanded to include doctoral-level degrees in nursing that later grew into an entire school of nursing.

== Academics ==
The college's Bachelor of Arts and Bachelor of Science programs span more than 35 majors. The curriculum also includes professional advising programs in Pre-Dentistry, Pre-Medicine, and Pre-Veterinary Medicine.

In 1974, the college offered its first bachelor's degree in nursing. The first nursing class graduated in 1978. This program was the first of its kind in the Lehigh Valley.

Cedar Crest College also offers over 15 programs at the graduate level. Its MBA Program offers a focus on Women's Leadership. The Pan-European MFA Program in Creative Writing is the first MFA low-residency program in the United States with entirely international residencies. Cedar Crest College is also home to the first Master of Crime Science degree in the United States.

The College expanded again to offer its first doctorate program in 2017. Starting with a Doctor of Nursing practice, the college now offers four doctoral degrees in Adult Gerontology Acute Care Nursing Practice, Family/Individual Across the Lifespan Nursing Practice, Nurse Anesthesia, and Occupational Therapy.

=== The Carmen Twillie Ambar Sophomore Expedition ===
Started in 2016 by college president Carmen Twillie Ambar, each sophomore class at Cedar Crest is offered a 7- to 10-day study abroad experience in the spring of their second year at no cost to the student, excluding passport and personal spending costs. All full-time, traditional students are eligible for the Sophomore expedition as long as they remain in good academic, social, and financial standing with the college. In 2023, the Sophomore Expedition received the National Association of International Educators (NAFSA) Senator Paul Simon Spotlight Award for Campus Internationalization.

== Campus ==
Cedar Crest is located off Cedar Crest Boulevard at 100 College Drive on the western edge of Allentown, Pennsylvania. The 84-acre (34 ha) campus is adjacent to the city's Cedar Beach Park.

Buildings include Blaney Hall, The Narrows, Curtis Hall, and Hamilton Boulevard Building. The college also has four residence halls: Butz Hall, Moore Hall, Steinbright Hall, and the upper level of Curtis Hall.

Cedar Crest's collection of 140 species of trees is designated as the William F. Curtis Arboretum, which is registered with the American Public Gardens Association. The arboretum is named for the college's seventh president, who after purchasing the property in 1915, beautified the campus by planting flowers, shrubs and trees from all over the world.

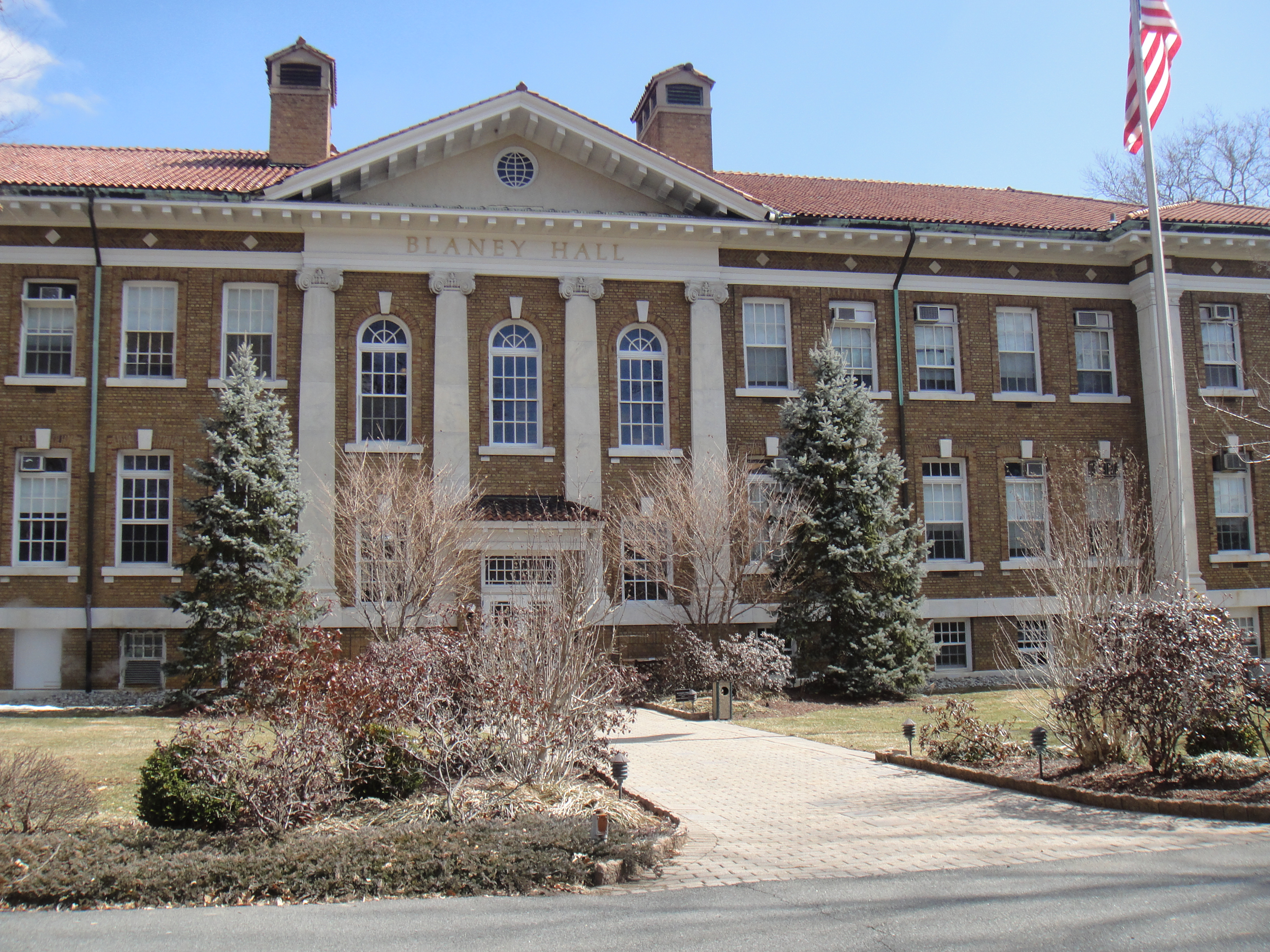
Blaney Hall

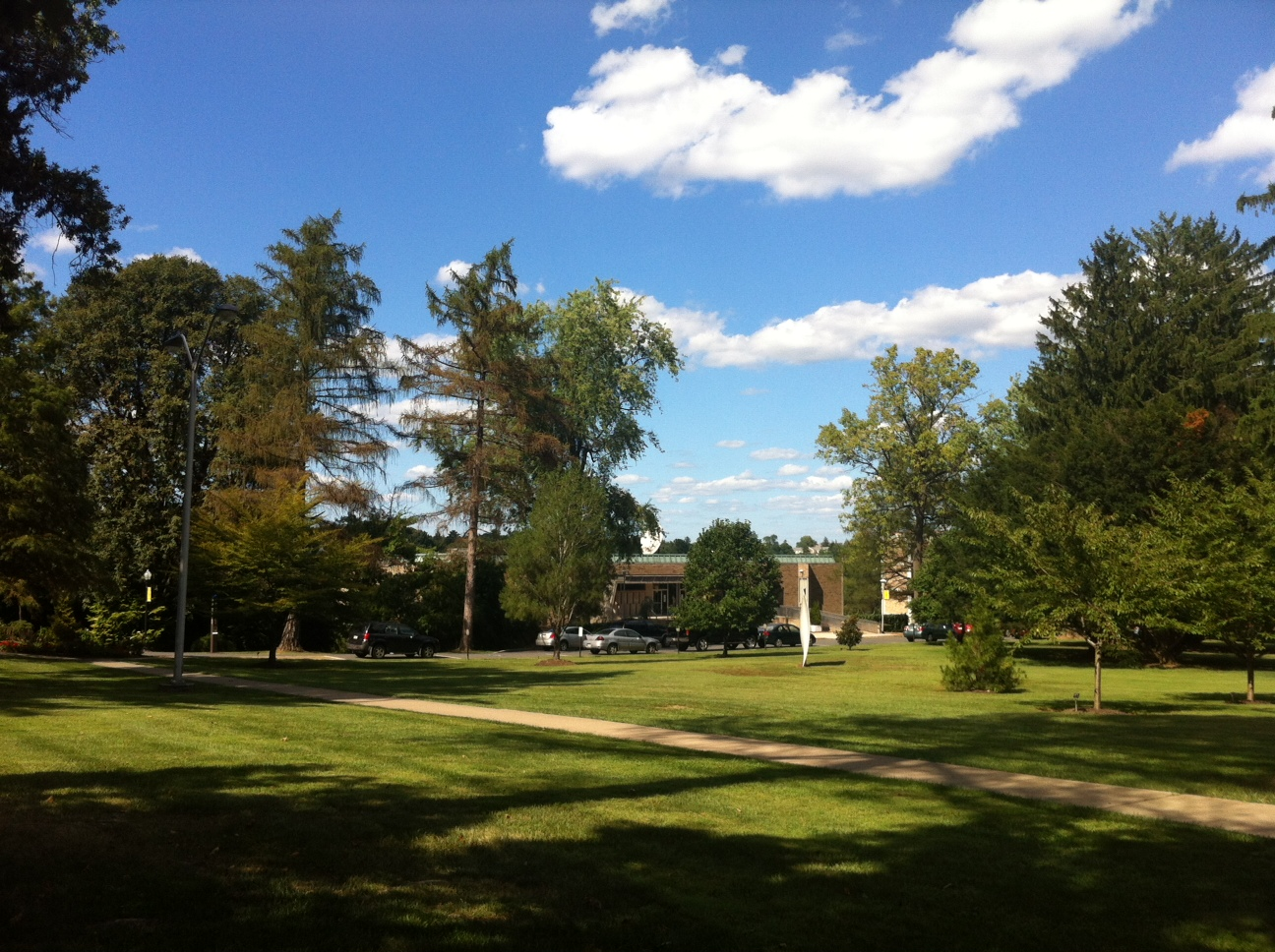
Cressman Library

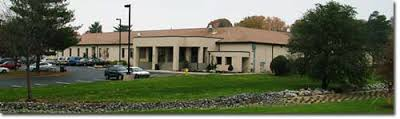
Hamilton Building

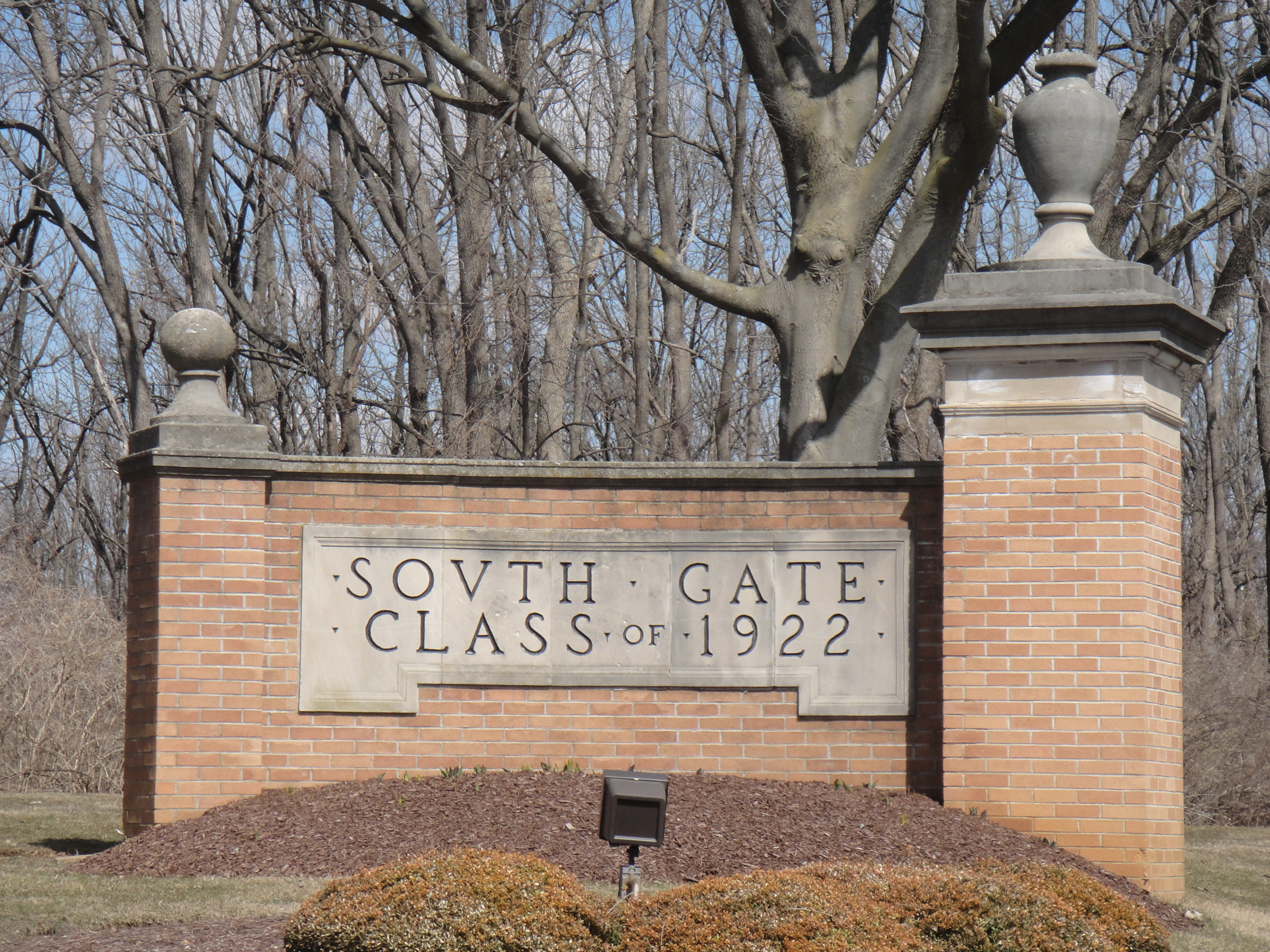
South gate

== Athletics ==
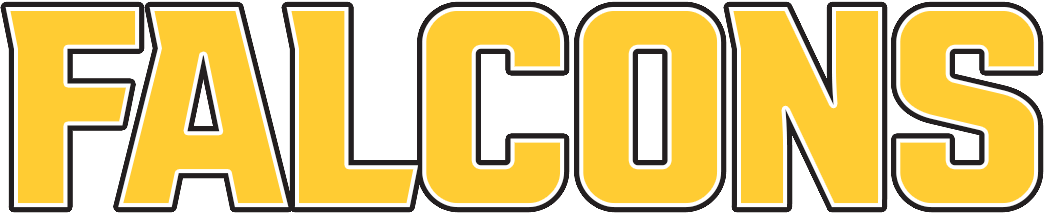
Cedar Crest athletics wordmark

Cedar Crest, known athletically as the Falcons, competes in NCAA Division III athletics. The college fields teams in basketball, cross country running, field hockey, lacrosse, soccer, softball, tennis, swimming and diving, track and field, wrestling, and volleyball.

The Rodale Aquatic Center on campus is home to the college's swimming and diving team.

== Notable alumni ==
- Jane Amsterdam, editor of Manhattan, inc. and the New York Post
- Rita Kogler Carver, theater and lighting designer
- Jane Dyer, illustrator of children's books
- Judy McGrath, CEO of MTV
- Milou Mackenzie, member of the Pennsylvania House of Representatives
- Dorothy Page, actress
- Suzanne Fisher Staples, author and international news reporter
- Blenda Wilson, first African-American woman to become president of a large American university

== Notable faculty ==
- Chrystelle Trump Bond, American dancer, choreographer, and dance historian
- Anthony S. Caprio, French language scholar and academic administrator
- Richard Druckenbrod, theology professor and Pennsylvania German language scholar
- Diane Moyer, Olympic field hockey player and psychologist
- Barton C. Shaw, historian
