= Manhattan, inc. =

- August, 1988 cover
- Editor: Jane Amsterdam (1984–1987); Clay Felker (1987–1990)
- Frequency: Monthly
- Circulation: 115,000
- Publisher: D. Herbert Lipson
- Founded: 1984
- Final issue: 1990
- ISSN: 0748-6472

Manhattan, inc. was an American monthly magazine published in New York City. From 1984 to 1990 it profiled the rich and powerful figures of New York City's business world, and featured stories by prominent freelancers such as John Seabrook, Ron Rosenbaum, and Gwenda Blair.

Manhattan, inc. was founded by D. Herbert Lipson, owner of Philadelphia and Boston magazines. The first issue debuted in September, 1984, edited by Jane Amsterdam, who previously edited New Times and The American Lawyer. In 1985, after only four issues, it received a National Magazine Award for General Excellence. Amsterdam and eight other staffers departed in March 1987 over a dispute with Lipson about editorial integrity. Clay Felker, the founding editor of New York, replaced Amsterdam as editor. Under Felker, the magazine became "less sassy, less critical, and more featurish in tone" (Spy magazine wrote Felker "helped dull the magazine's cutting edge"). It suffered financially after the October 1987 stock market crash, and ceased publication in July, 1990, merging with the men's lifestyle magazine M to become M, inc.

Calling it a "Yuppie Anti-Yuppie Magazine," writer Brian Morton described Manhattan, inc. as "aimed at a young, hip audience of people who see through the hypocrisies of the business world even as they want to make their way in it."
