= Outline of Pennsylvania =

Overview of and topical guide to Pennsylvania

The flag of Pennsylvania

The obverse of the seal of Pennsylvania

The location of the Commonwealth of Pennsylvania in the United States

The following outline is provided as an overview of and topical guide to the United States Commonwealth of Pennsylvania:

The Commonwealth of Pennsylvania is the fifth most populous of the 50 states of the United States. Pennsylvania lies west of the Delaware River in the Mid-Atlantic United States.

King Charles II of England granted William Penn a charter for a Colony of Pennsylvania in 1681. Philadelphia, the capital of the colony, soon rose to become the most populous city of British America. As Britain attempted to tighten its grip on its American colonies, many prominent Pennsylvanians called for greater independence for British America. The upper and lower counties of Pennsylvania (now known as Delaware) joined eleven other British colonies in declaring their autonomy with signing of the United States Declaration of Independence in Philadelphia on July 4, 1776.

The newly independent state chose the moniker "Commonwealth of Pennsylvania" as a token of its prominence and autonomy in the Americas. The American states prevailed in the American War of Independence which concluded with the Treaty of Paris of 1783. The Constitution of the United States was written in convention at Philadelphia in 1787. The State of Delaware and the Commonwealth of Pennsylvania became the first two states to ratify the new Constitution, thus Pennsylvania is ranked as the second state to join the Union.

== General reference ==
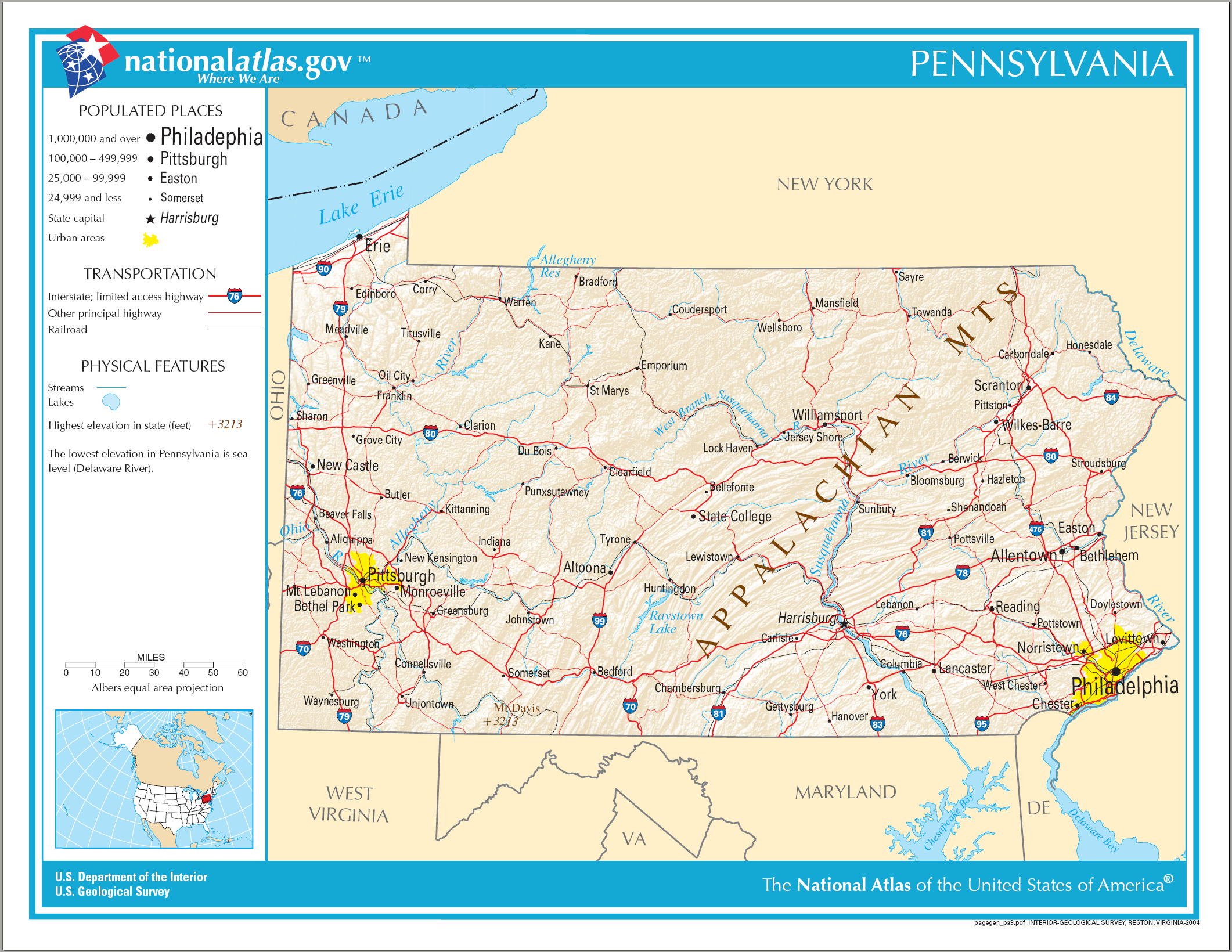
An enlargeable map of the Commonwealth of Pennsylvania

- Names
  - Common name: Pennsylvania
    - Pronunciation: /ˌpɛnsəlˈveɪniə, -sɪlˈ-/
  - Official name: Commonwealth of Pennsylvania (also known as the state of Pennsylvania)
  - Abbreviations and name codes
    - Postal symbol: PA
    - ISO 3166-2 code: US-PA
    - Internet second-level domain: .pa.us
  - Nicknames
    - Liberty Bell State
    - Independence State
    - Keystone State
    - Quaker State
- Adjectival: Pennsylvania
- Demonym: Pennsylvanian

== Geography of Pennsylvania ==
Geography of Pennsylvania

- Pennsylvania is: a U.S. state, a federal state of the United States of America
- Location
  - Northern Hemisphere
  - Western Hemisphere
    - Americas
      - North America
        - Anglo America
        - Northern America
          - United States of America
            - Contiguous United States
              - Eastern United States
                - East Coast of the United States – though Pennsylvania does not include any actual coastline, it is generally considered to be part of the Eastern Seaboard region.
                  - Northeastern United States
                - Mid-Atlantic states
              - Great Lakes Region
- Population of Pennsylvania: 12,702,379 (2010 U.S. Census)
- Area of Pennsylvania: 46,055 sq mi (119,283 km^{2})
- Atlas of Pennsylvania

=== Places in Pennsylvania ===
Places in Pennsylvania

- Historic places in Pennsylvania
  - Abandoned communities in Pennsylvania
    - Ghost towns in Pennsylvania
  - National Historic Landmarks in Pennsylvania
  - National Register of Historic Places listings in Pennsylvania
    - Bridges on the National Register of Historic Places in Pennsylvania
- National Natural Landmarks in Pennsylvania
- State parks in Pennsylvania

=== Environment of Pennsylvania ===
- Climate of Pennsylvania
- Geology of Pennsylvania
- Protected areas in Pennsylvania
  - State forests of Pennsylvania
- Superfund sites in Pennsylvania
- Wildlife of Pennsylvania
  - Fauna of Pennsylvania
    - Birds of Pennsylvania
    - Mammals of Pennsylvania

==== Natural geographic features of Pennsylvania ====
- Lakes of Pennsylvania
- Rivers of Pennsylvania

=== Regions of Pennsylvania ===
- Philadelphia metropolitan area
  - Philadelphia
  - Reading
- Lehigh Valley
  - Allentown
  - Bethlehem
- Northeastern Pennsylvania
  - Scranton
- Western Pennsylvania
  - Erie
  - Greater Pittsburgh
    - Pittsburgh

==== Administrative divisions of Pennsylvania ====
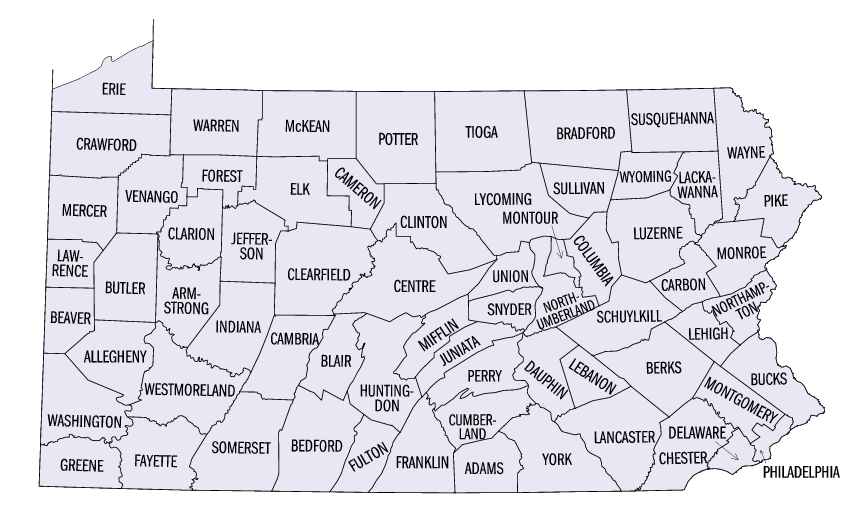
An enlargeable map of the 67 counties of the Commonwealth of Pennsylvania.

- The 67 Counties of the Commonwealth of Pennsylvania
  - Municipalities in Pennsylvania
    - Cities in Pennsylvania
      - State capital of Pennsylvania:
      - City nicknames in Pennsylvania
      - Sister cities in Pennsylvania

=== Demography of Pennsylvania ===
- Demographics of Pennsylvania
  - List of people from Pennsylvania

== Government and politics of Pennsylvania ==
Politics of Pennsylvania

- Form of government: U. S. state government
- Pennsylvania's congressional delegations
- Pennsylvania State Capitol
- Elections in Pennsylvania
  - Electoral reform in Pennsylvania
- Political party strength in Pennsylvania

=== Branches of the government of Pennsylvania ===
Government of Pennsylvania

==== Executive branch of the government of Pennsylvania ====
- Governor of Pennsylvania
  - Lieutenant Governor of Pennsylvania
  - Secretary of the Commonwealth of Pennsylvania
  - State Treasurer of Pennsylvania
- State departments
  - Pennsylvania Department of Transportation

==== Legislative branch of the government of Pennsylvania ====
- Pennsylvania General Assembly (bicameral)
  - Upper house: Pennsylvania Senate
  - Lower house: Pennsylvania House of Representatives

==== Judicial branch of the government of Pennsylvania ====
Unified Judicial System of Pennsylvania

- Supreme Court of Pennsylvania

=== Law and order in Pennsylvania ===
Law of Pennsylvania

- Cannabis in Pennsylvania
- Capital punishment in Pennsylvania
  - Individuals executed in Pennsylvania
- Constitution of Pennsylvania
- Crime in Pennsylvania
- Gun laws in Pennsylvania
- Law enforcement in Pennsylvania
  - Law enforcement agencies in Pennsylvania
    - Pennsylvania State Police
- Same-sex marriage in Pennsylvania

=== Military in Pennsylvania ===
- Pennsylvania Air National Guard
- Pennsylvania Army National Guard

=== Local government in Pennsylvania ===
Local government in Pennsylvania

== History of Pennsylvania ==
History of Pennsylvania

=== History of Pennsylvania, by period ===
- Indigenous peoples
- Indentured servitude in Pennsylvania
- Netherlands colony of Nieuw-Nederland, 1624–1652
  - History of slavery in Pennsylvania, 1639–1847
- Swedish colony of Nya Sverige, 1638–1655
- Netherlands province of Nieuw-Nederland, 1652–1664
- English Province of New-York, (1664–1681)–1688
- English Province of Pennsylvania, 1681–1707
- British Colony of Pennsylvania, 1707–1776
- French colony of la Louisiane, 1699–(1754–1763)
- French and Indian War, 1754–1763
  - Treaty of Fontainebleau of 1762
- British Indian Reserve in western Pennsylvania, 1763–1783
  - Royal Proclamation of 1763
- American Revolutionary War, April 19, 1775 – September 3, 1783
  - United States Declaration of Independence, July 4, 1776
  - Philadelphia campaign, 1777–1778
    - Battle of Germantown, October 4, 1777
    - Siege of Fort Mifflin, September 26 to November 16, 1777
- Commonwealth of Pennsylvania since 1776
  - Whiskey Rebellion, 1790s
    - Eighth state to ratify the Articles of Confederation and Perpetual Union, signed July 9, 1778
  - Second State to ratify the Constitution of the United States of America on December 11, 1787
  - Erie Triangle purchased 1792
  - War of 1812, June 18, 1812 – March 23, 1815
    - Treaty of Ghent, December 24, 1814
  - Mexican–American War, April 25, 1846 – February 2, 1848
  - James Buchanan becomes 15th President of the United States on March 4, 1857
  - American Civil War, April 12, 1861 – May 13, 1865
    - Pennsylvania in the American Civil War, 1861–1865
      - 47th Pennsylvania Infantry Regiment
      - Gettysburg campaign, June 9 – July 14, 1863
        - Battle of Gettysburg, July 1–3, 1863
        - Gettysburg Address, November 19, 1863

=== History of Pennsylvania, by region ===
==== By county ====
- History of Allegheny County
- History of Lycoming County
- History of Philadelphia County

==== By municipality ====
- History of Erie
- History of Harrisburg
- History of the Townships of Lycoming County, Pennsylvania
- History of Philadelphia
- History of Pittsburgh
- History of Williamsport

=== History of Pennsylvania, by subject ===
- List of Pennsylvania state legislatures
- History of the Pennsylvania State University
- History of rail transport in Philadelphia
- History of slavery in Pennsylvania
- History of veterinary medicine in Pennsylvania
- Jewish history in Pennsylvania

== Culture of Pennsylvania ==
Culture of Pennsylvania

- Cuisine of Pennsylvania
- Museums in Pennsylvania
- Religion in Pennsylvania
  - Episcopal Diocese of Pennsylvania
- Scouting in Pennsylvania
- State symbols of Pennsylvania
  - Flag of the Commonwealth of Pennsylvania
  - Great Seal of the Commonwealth of Pennsylvania

=== The Arts in Pennsylvania ===
- Music of Pennsylvania

=== Sports in Pennsylvania ===
- Sports in Pennsylvania
  - Sports in Allentown, Pennsylvania
  - Sports in Philadelphia
  - Sports in Pittsburgh

== Economy and infrastructure of Pennsylvania ==
Economy of Pennsylvania

- Communications in Pennsylvania
- Allentown economy
  - Newspapers in Pennsylvania
  - Radio stations in Pennsylvania
  - Television stations in Pennsylvania
- Energy in Pennsylvania
  - Coal mining in Pennsylvania
  - History of logging in Pennsylvania
  - Oil rush in Pennsylvania
  - Power stations in Pennsylvania
  - Solar power in Pennsylvania
  - Wind power in Pennsylvania
- Health care in Pennsylvania
  - Hospitals in Pennsylvania
- Transportation in Pennsylvania
  - Airports in Pennsylvania
  - Roads in Pennsylvania
    - Interstate Highways in Pennsylvania

== Education in Pennsylvania ==
Education in Pennsylvania

- Schools in Pennsylvania
  - School districts in Pennsylvania
    - High schools in Pennsylvania
  - Colleges and universities in Pennsylvania
    - Cedar Crest College (1867)
    - DeSales University (1964)
    - Lafayette College (1826)
    - Lehigh University (1865)
    - Moravian College (1742)
    - Muhlenberg College (1848)
    - University of Pennsylvania (1740)
    - University of Pittsburgh (1787)
    - Lincoln University (Pennsylvania) (1854)
    - Pennsylvania State University (1855)
    - Pennsylvania State System of Higher Education (1857)
    - Temple University (1884)

== See also ==
- Topic overview:
  - Pennsylvania
  - Index of Pennsylvania-related articles
