= Geography of Pennsylvania =

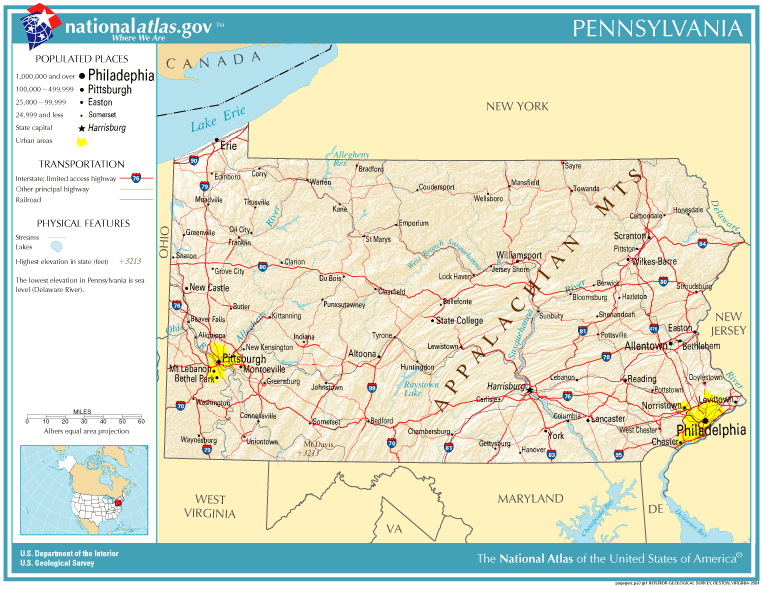
Map of Pennsylvania's cities and rivers

The geography of Pennsylvania varies from sea level marine estuary to mountainous plateau. The state is known for its natural resources, ports, and the leading role it played in the founding and history of the United States.

== Major features ==
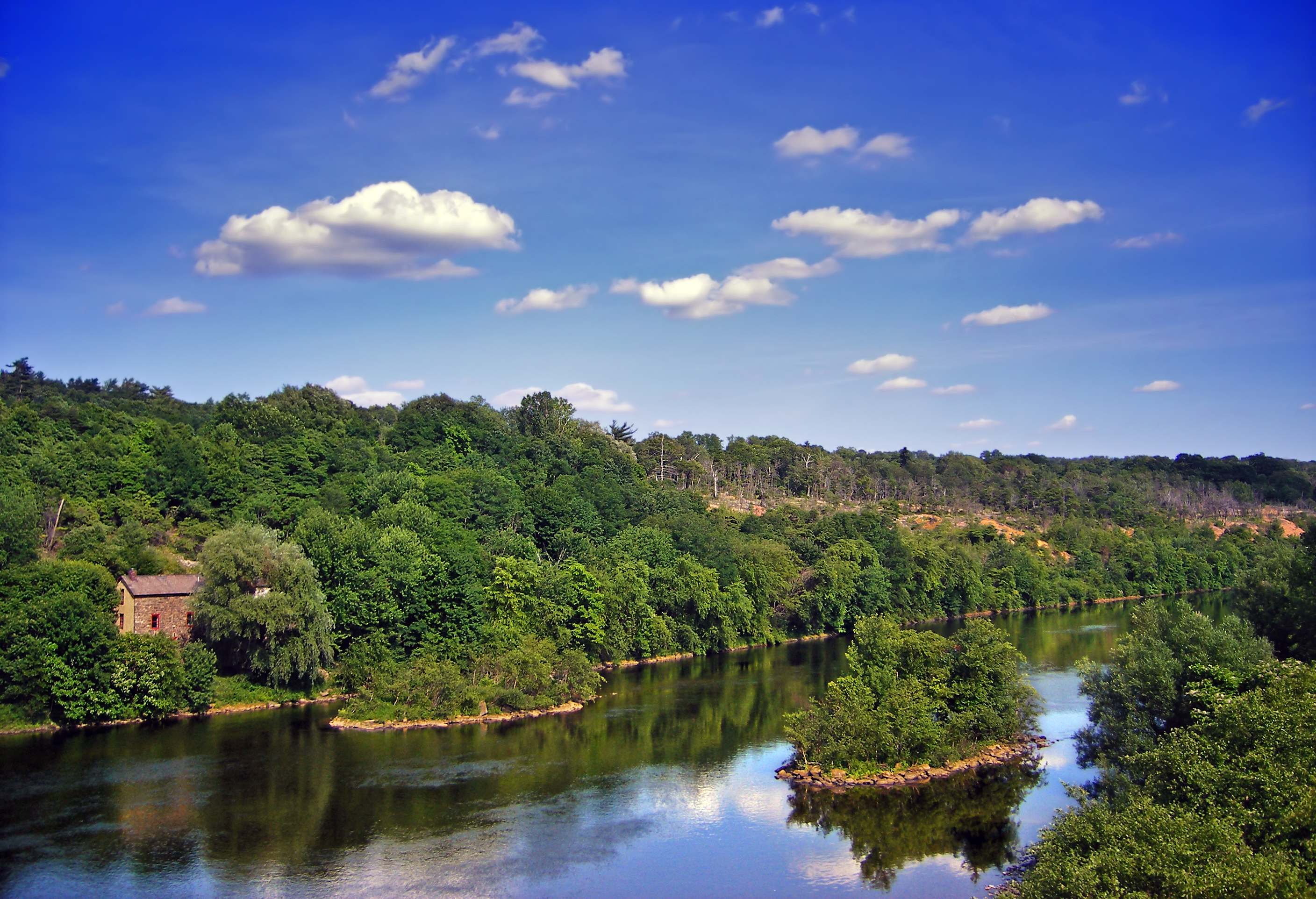
The Lehigh River in the Lehigh Valley

Pennsylvania's nickname, the Keystone State, derives from the fact that the state forms a geographic bridge both between the Northeastern United States and the Southern United States between the Atlantic seaboard and Midwest. The state western toehold extends to the Great Lakes at Erie.

Pennsylvania is bordered on the north and northeast by New York; on the east by New Jersey; on the south by Delaware, Maryland, and West Virginia; on the west by Ohio; and on the northwest by Lake Erie. It has a small border on Lake Erie with Canada. The Delaware, Schuylkill, Susquehanna, Monongahela, Allegheny, and Ohio rivers are the state's major rivers. The state has the highest density of waterways of any state in the continental United States. The Lehigh River in the state's east and Oil Creek in its west are smaller waterways that played vital roles in Pennsylvania's early industrial development. Pennsylvania is one of 13 original colonies that share a border with Canada.

Pennsylvania is 180 miles (290 km) north to south and 310 miles (500 km) east to west. The total land area is 44,817 square miles (116,080 km^{2})—739,200 acres (2,991 km^{2}) of which are bodies of water. It is the 33rd largest state in the United States. The state's highest point is 3,213 feet (979 m) above sea level at Mount Davis. Its lowest point is at sea level on the Delaware River.

== Regions ==
=== Pennsylvania Dutch region ===
The Pennsylvania Dutch region in south-central Pennsylvania is a favorite for sightseers. The Pennsylvania Dutch, including the Amish, Mennonites, and at least 15 other sects are common in the rural areas around the cities of Lancaster, York, and Harrisburg with smaller populations extending northeast to the Lehigh Valley and up to the Susquehanna Valley. Some adherents eschew modern conveniences and use horse-drawn farming equipment and carriages, while others are virtually indistinguishable from non-Amish or Mennonites. Descendants of these plain sect immigrants, who do not practice the faith, often refer to themselves as Pennsylvania Germans.

Despite the name, the Pennsylvania Dutch are from various parts of southwest Germany, Alsace, and Switzerland, not the Netherlands. The word Dutch is left over from the original meaning of the English word Dutch, which once referred to the entire West Germanic dialect continuum.

=== Western Pennsylvania ===
Western Pennsylvania, which comprises roughly a third of the state, is a separate large geophysical unit. Several factors set Western Pennsylvania apart from the east, including the initial difficulty of access across the mountains, rivers oriented to the Mississippi River drainage system, and complex economics involved in the rise and decline of the American steel industry centered in and around Pittsburgh, the state's second-largest city. Other factors, such as a markedly different style of agriculture, the rise of the oil industry, timber exploitation and the old wood chemical industry, and local dialect, all make Western Pennsylvania distinct from other regions of the state.

=== The mountains ===
The Ridge-and-Valley Appalachians curve in Pennsylvania terrain. From the Poconos, the parallel ridges again turn northerly diagonally across Eastern New York, where the Delaware and Hudson rivers both cut through the ridges, through Connecticut and Western Massachusetts, then continue on as the northern Appalachian Mountains in Northern New England.

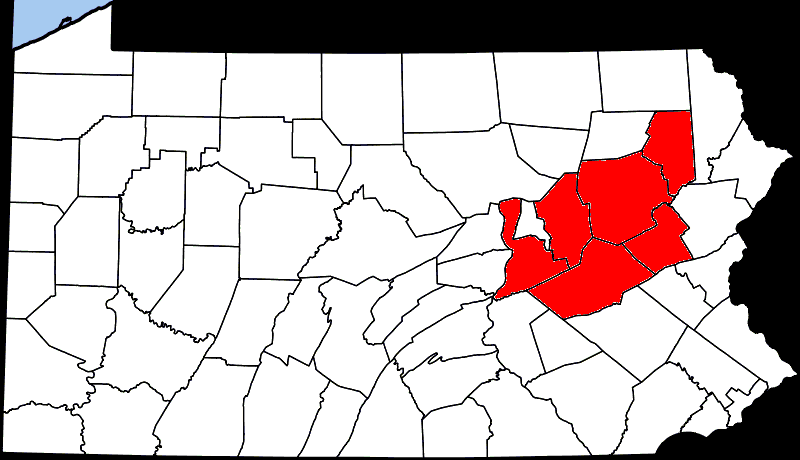
Counties of Pennsylvania's Coal Region, known for its anthracite

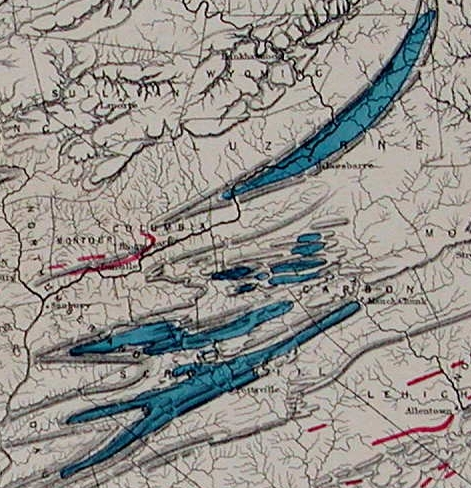
Pennsylvania's anthracite coal fields

Pennsylvania is bisected in an S-curve, or roughly diagonally, by the barrier ridges of the Appalachian Mountains from southwest to northeast, forcing pre-20th century ground travel most often on or near the ancient Amerindian trails along the higher terrains of the local watersheds with limited penetration and connectivity often only through water gaps. As rough looking as the first map appears, the valley bottoms throughout the entire central part of the state and parts of lower New York state are connected by the Susquehanna River and its tributaries, which included nearly the entire length of the Pennsylvania Canal System in the 1830s. To the northwest of the folded mountains is the Allegheny Plateau, which lies above the cliff-like Allegheny Front escarpment, continues into southwestern and south central New York, and is pierced in only a few places known as the Gaps of the Allegheny.

The Allegheny Plateau is dissected by valleys formed by small streams and springs with elevation differences between valley floors and hilltop peaks differences that usually vary by a few hundred feet. The plateau is underlain by sedimentary rocks of Mississippian and Pennsylvanian age, which bear abundant fossils, mineral deposits such as iron, as well as natural gas, coal and petroleum. These regions fostered 17th-19th century industries locally, even into the 1930s days of mass production. To the south and east of the escarpment/plateau region, the folded mountains and alternating valleys are known as the Ridge-and-Valley Appalachians. These extend from the South of the Appalachians to northern New England except where it is cut by water gaps. In Northeastern Pennsylvania east of Harrisburg on the Susquehanna River, these ridge and valley features contain the richest and most widespread deposits of high energy clean burning anthracite coal in the world—the Coal Region—without which the American Industrial Revolution likely would have been delayed or not possible.

In 1859, Edwin L. Drake drilled the first oil well in the U.S. near Titusville. Similar rock layers also contain coal to the south and east of the oil and gas deposits. In the metamorphic (folded) belt, anthracite (hard coal) is mined near Wilkes-Barre and Hazelton. These fossil fuels have been an important resource to Pennsylvania. Timber and dairy farming are also sources of livelihood for midstate and western Pennsylvania. Orchards and vineyards exist along the shore of Lake Erie in the state's far northwest.

During the most recent Ice Age, the northeastern and northwestern corners of present day Pennsylvania were buried under the southern fringes of the Laurentide Ice Sheet. Glaciers extended into the Appalachian valleys of Central Pennsylvania, but the ice did not top the mountains. At its furthest extent, it spread as far south as Moraine State Park, about 40 miles (64 km) north of Pittsburgh.

=== The shores ===
Pennsylvania has 57 miles (92 km) of shoreline along the Delaware River estuary, including the busy Port of Philadelphia, one of the largest seaports in the U.S. Chester, downstream, is a smaller but still important port. The tidal marsh of Pennsylvania's only saltwater shore has been protected as John Heinz National Wildlife Refuge at Tinicum.

Pennsylvania also has a narrow inland freshwater shore at Erie, the Great Lakes outlet on Lake Erie in the Erie Triangle.

In the west, the Port of Pittsburgh is large and even exceeds Philadelphia in rank by annual tonnage because of the large volume of bulk coal shipped by barge down the Ohio River.

== Ecological disasters ==
Pennsylvania has had several ecological disasters since the 19th century, including:

- In 1889, the South Fork Dam, impounding a recreational mountain lake for sportsmen, burst after a heavy rain and destroyed the downstream factory town of Johnstown, killing over 2,200 inhabitants in the notorious Johnstown Flood (the town was later rebuilt and is a reasonably large community today in the central mountains).
- In 1948, an air inversion over Donora trapped pollution from nearby metal processing plants, killing 20 and causing health complications for many more.
- In 1961, an exposed seam of coal at Centralia caught fire and eventually forced almost the entire community to abandon the area; the underground coal fire is still burning today, and it is estimated that it can burn for another 250 years.
- In 1979, the Three Mile Island Nuclear Power Incident near the state capital of Harrisburg, while not as destructive to the community, nevertheless cost close to $1 billion to clean up and changed the national public perception of nuclear power to a much less favorable viewpoint.

== Climate ==
Pennsylvania's Köppen climate classification map

Pennsylvania has three general climate regions, which are determined by altitude more than latitude or distance from the oceans. Most of the state falls in the humid continental climate zone. The lower elevations, including most of the major cities, has a moderate continental climate Köppen climate classification (Dfa), with cool to cold winters and hot, humid summers. Highland areas have a more severe continental climate (Köppen Dfb) with warm, humid summers and cold, more severe and snowy winters. Extreme southeastern Pennsylvania, around Philadelphia borders a humid subtropical climate (Köppen Cfa), with milder winters and hot, humid summers.

Precipitation is abundant throughout the state with the primary climatic influences being the Atlantic Ocean, the Gulf of Mexico, and Arctic influences that cross over the Great Lakes.

== See also ==
- Regions of Pennsylvania
- List of invasive plant species in Pennsylvania
