= Rust Belt =

Region in the U.S. affected by industrial decline

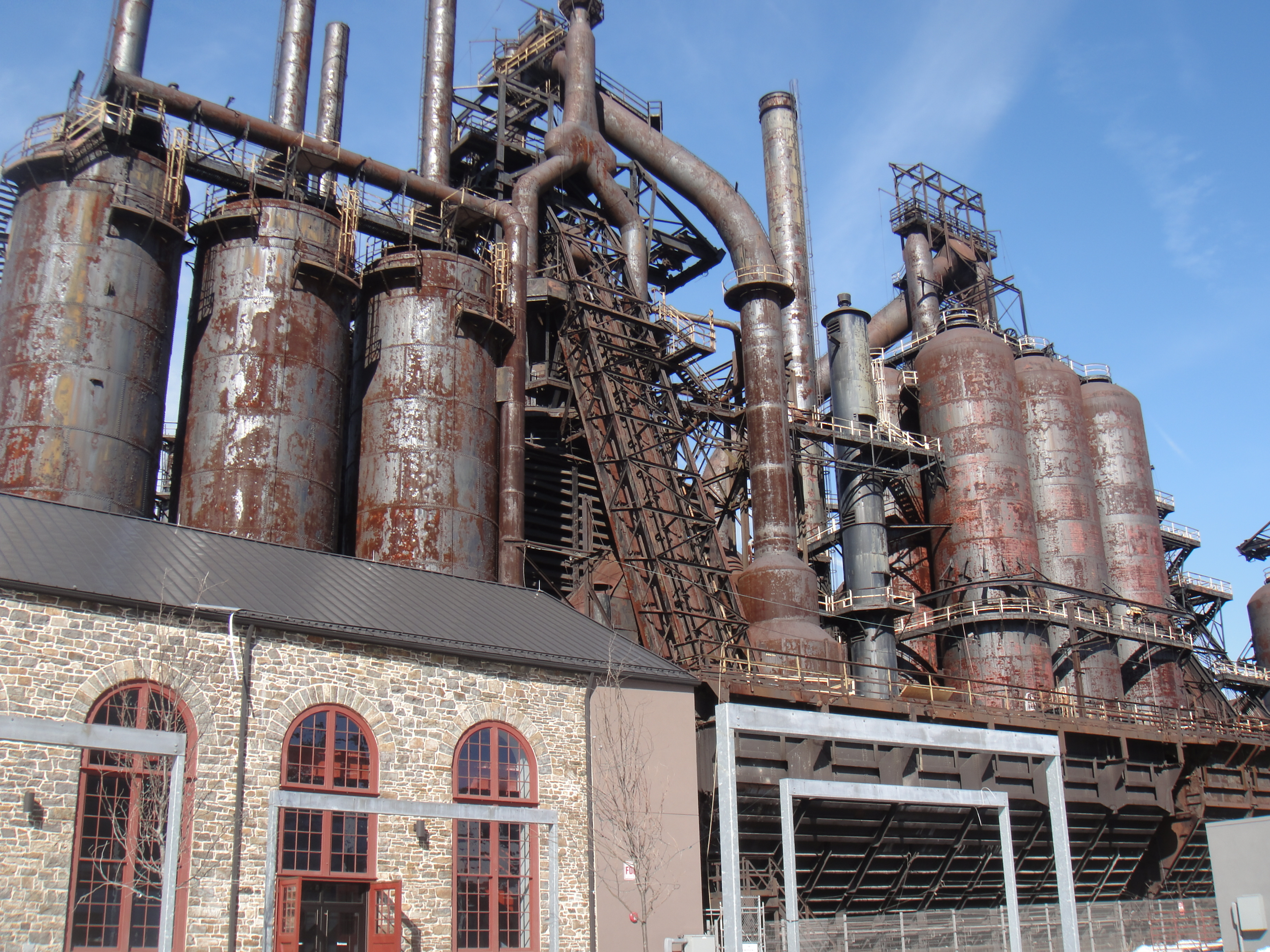
The rusting steel stacks of Bethlehem Steel in Bethlehem, Pennsylvania, one of the largest steel manufacturers for most of the 20th century until it abruptly discontinued most of its manufacturing in 1982, declared bankruptcy in 2001 and dissolved in 2003

The Rust Belt, formerly the Steel Belt or Factory Belt, is an area of the United States that underwent substantial industrial decline in the late 20th century. The region is centered in the Great Lakes and Mid Atlantic regions of the United States. Common definitions of the Rust Belt include Illinois, Indiana, Iowa, Michigan, Minnesota, New Jersey, New York, Ohio, Pennsylvania, and Wisconsin. The term "Rust Belt" is considered to be a pejorative by some people in the region.

Between the late 19th century and late 20th century, the Rust Belt formed the industrial heartland of the United States, and its economies were largely based on iron and steel, automobile manufacturing, coal mining, and the processing of raw materials. The term "Rust Belt", derived from the substance rust, refers to the socially corrosive effects of economic decline, population loss, and urban decay attributable to deindustrialization. The term gained popularity in the U.S. beginning in the 1980s, when it was commonly contrasted with the Sun Belt, whose economy was then thriving.

The Rust Belt experienced industrial decline beginning in the 1950s and 1960s, with manufacturing peaking as a percentage of U.S. GDP in 1953 and declining incrementally in subsequent years and especially in the late 1970s and early 1980s. Demand for coal declined as industry turned to oil and natural gas, and U.S. steel was undercut by competition from Germany and Japan. High labor costs in the Rust Belt were also a factor in encouraging the region's heavy manufacturing companies to relocate to the Sun Belt or overseas or to discontinue entirely. The U.S. automotive industry also declined as consumers turned to fuel-efficient foreign-manufactured vehicles after the 1973 oil crisis raised the cost of gasoline and foreign auto manufacturers began opening factories in the U.S., which were largely not strongly unionized like the U.S. auto manufacturers in the Rust Belt. Families moved away from Rust Belt communities, leaving cities with falling tax revenues, declining infrastructure, and abandoned buildings.

Major Rust Belt cities include Baltimore, Buffalo, Chicago, Cincinnati, Cleveland, Detroit, Milwaukee, Philadelphia, Pittsburgh, Rochester, St. Louis, and Syracuse, largely in the Midwest and by the Great Lakes. The Northeast was also hit hard by industrial decline, but cities closer to the East Coast, including in the metropolitan areas of Boston, New York, and Washington, D.C. were able to quickly adapt by diversifying or transforming their economies, shifting to services, advanced manufacturing, and high-tech industries. Conversely, parts of cities otherwise unaffected by the Rust Belt declined as a result of industrial dependence; such as Gert Town in New Orleans and South Los Angeles.

Since the 1980s, presidential candidates have devoted much of their time to the economic concerns of the Rust Belt region, which includes several populous swing states, including Michigan, Ohio, Pennsylvania, and Wisconsin.

== Background ==
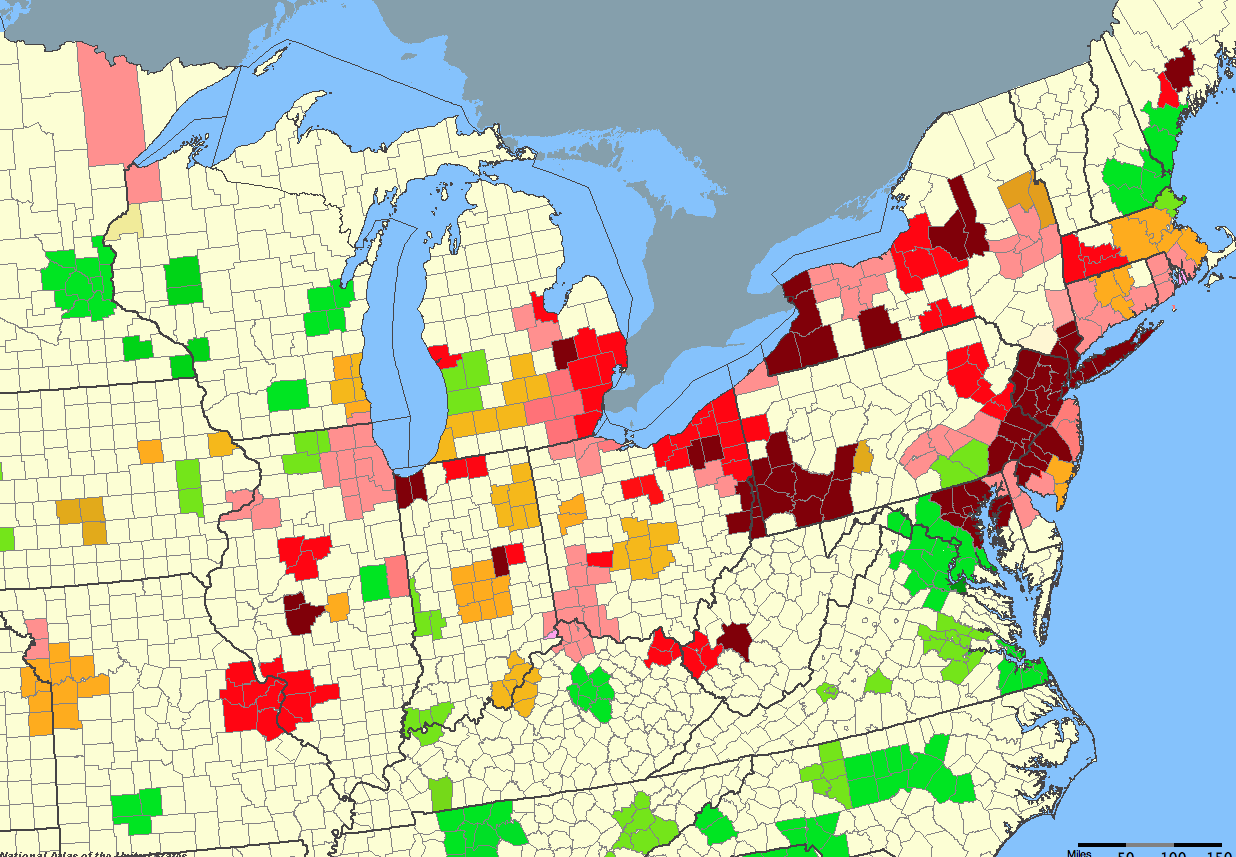
The change in the total number of manufacturing jobs in metropolitan areas between 1954 and 2002 (the figures for New England are from 1958 to 2002): >58% loss 43–56% loss 31–43.2% loss 8.7–29.1% loss [US avg.: 8.65% loss] 7.5% loss – 54.4% gain >62% gain

In the 20th century, local economies in these states specialized in large-scale manufacturing of finished medium to heavy industrial and consumer products, and the transportation and processing of the raw materials required for heavy industry. The area was referred to as the Manufacturing Belt, Factory Belt, or Steel Belt as distinct from the agricultural Midwestern states forming the so-called Corn Belt and Great Plains states that are often called the "breadbasket of America".

The flourishing industrial manufacturing in the region was caused in part by the proximity to the Great Lakes waterways, and abundance of paved roads, water canals, and railroads. After the transportation infrastructure linked the iron ore found in the so-called Iron Range of northern Minnesota, Wisconsin and Upper Michigan with the coking coal mined from the Appalachian Basin in Western Pennsylvania and Western Virginia, the Steel Belt was born. Soon it developed into the Factory Belt with its manufacturing cities: Chicago, Buffalo, Detroit, Milwaukee, Cincinnati, Toledo, Cleveland, St. Louis, Youngstown, and Pittsburgh, among others. This region for decades served as a magnet for immigrants from Austria-Hungary, Poland, and Russia, as well as Yugoslavia, Italy, and the Levant in some areas, who provided the industrial facilities with inexpensive labor. These migrants drawn by labor were also accompanied by African Americans during the Great Migration who were drawn by jobs and better economic opportunity.

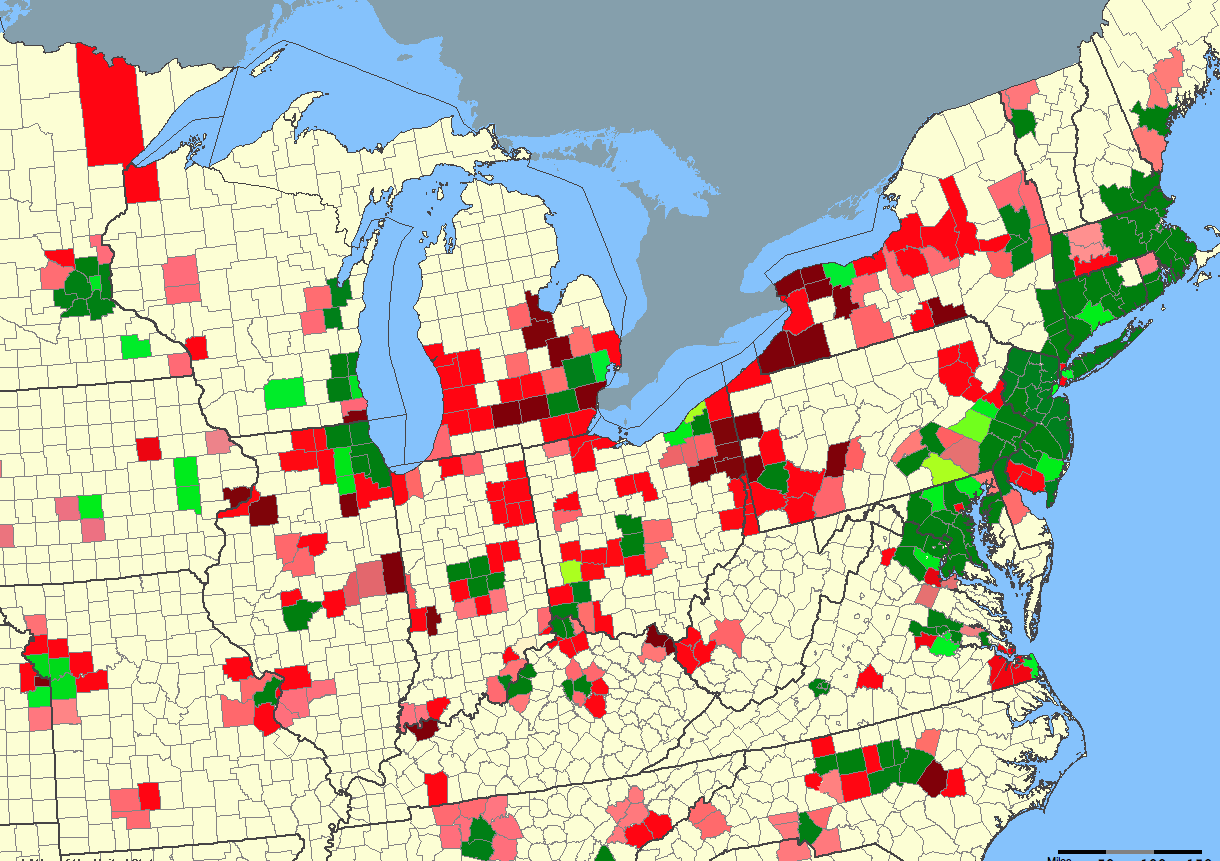
The change in per capita personal income in metropolitan counties relative to average U.S. metropolitan areas between 1980 and 2002: income above avg., growth faster than avg. income above avg., growth avg. or below avg. income above avg. but decreasing income below avg., growth faster than avg. income below avg., growth avg. or below avg. income below avg. and further decreasing

Following several "boom" periods from the late-19th to the mid-20th century, cities in this area struggled to adapt to a variety of adverse economic and social conditions. From 1979 to 1982, known as the Volcker shock, the U.S. Federal Reserve decided to raise the base interest rate in the United States to 19%. High interest rates attracted wealthy foreign "hot money" into U.S. banks and caused the U.S. dollar to appreciate. This made U.S. products more expensive for foreigners to buy and also made imports much cheaper for Americans to purchase. The misaligned exchange rate was not rectified until 1986, by which time Japanese imports, in particular, had made rapid inroads into U.S. markets.

From 1987 to 1999, the U.S. stock market went into a stratospheric rise, and this continued to pull wealthy foreign money into U.S. banks, which biased the exchange rate against manufactured goods. Related issues include the decline of the iron and steel industry, the movement of manufacturing to the southeastern states with their lower labor costs, the layoffs due to the rise of automation in industrial processes, the decreased need for labor in making steel products, new organizational methods such as just-in-time manufacturing which allowed factories to maintain production with fewer workers, the internationalization of American business, and the liberalization of foreign trade policies due to globalization. Cities struggling with these conditions shared several difficulties, including population loss, lack of education, declining tax revenues, high unemployment and crime, drugs, swelling welfare rolls, deficit spending, and poor municipal credit ratings.

== Geography ==
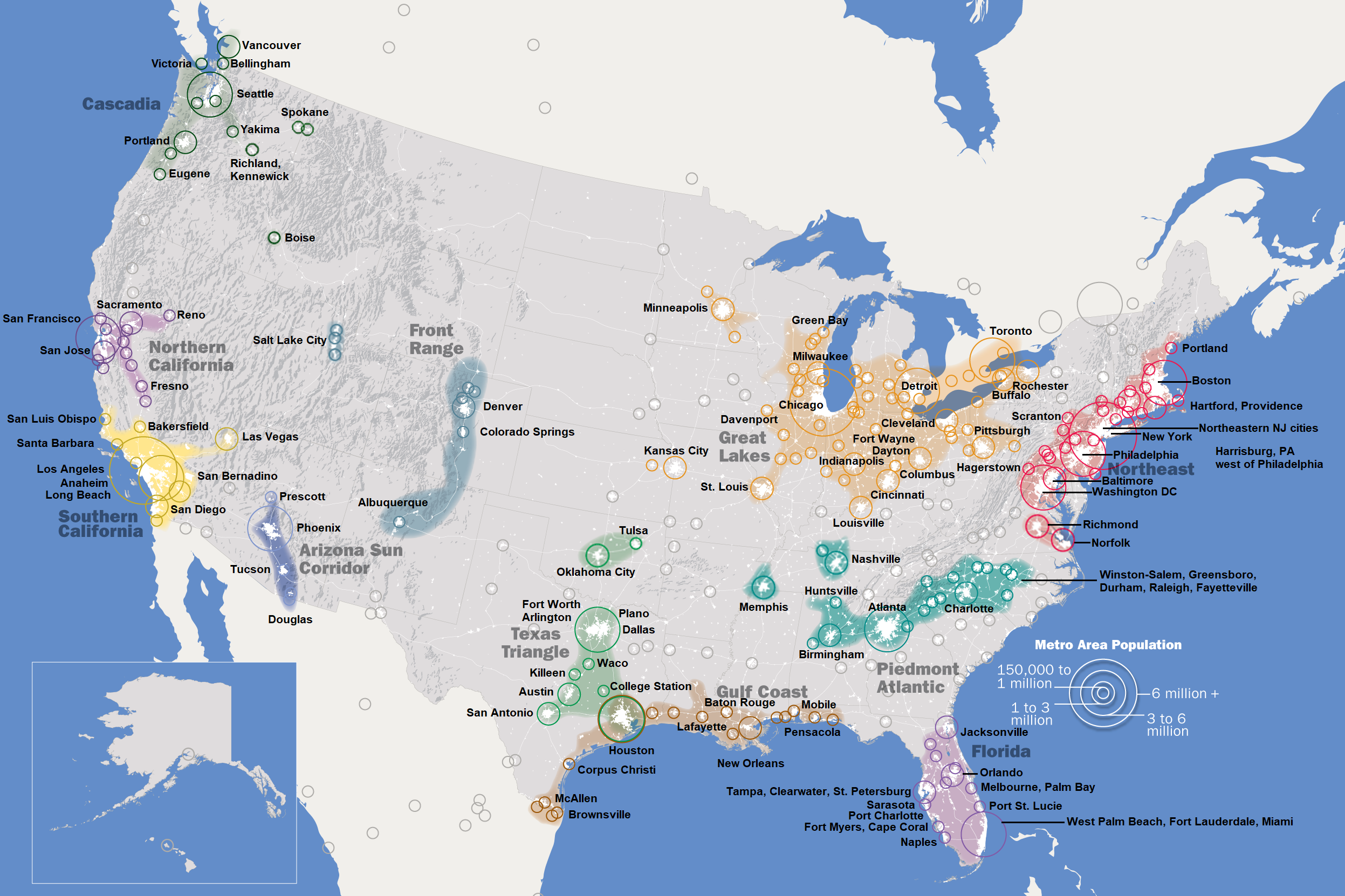
The Great Lakes megalopolis shown in orange, part of the Rust Belt

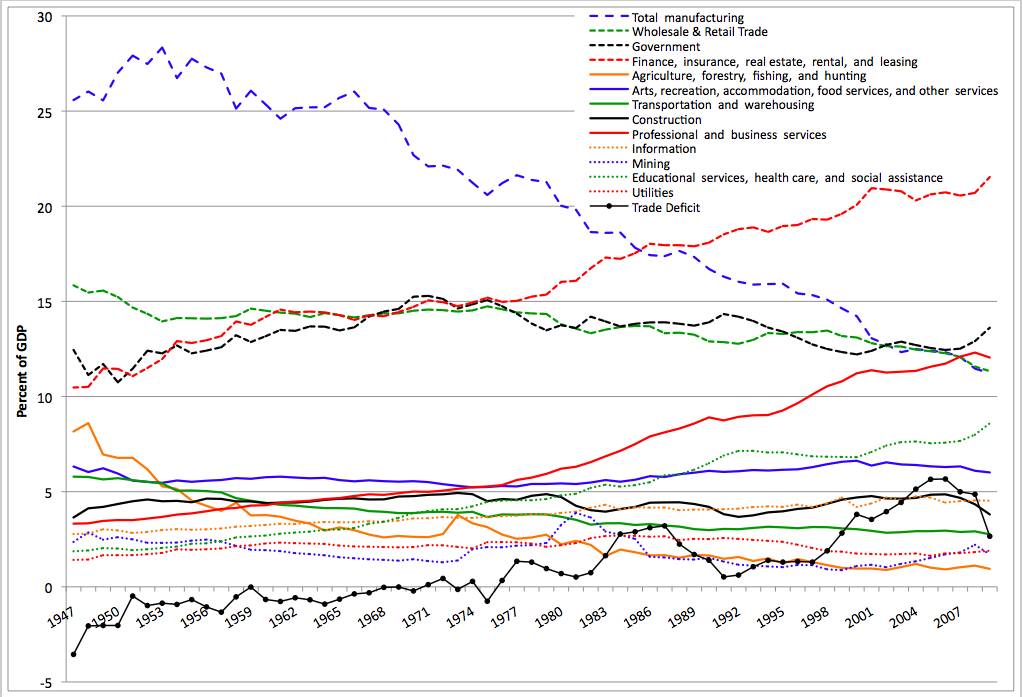
Sectors of the U.S. economy as a percentage of GDP between 1947 and 2009

Since the term "Rust Belt" is used to refer to a set of economic and social conditions rather than to an overall geographical region of the U.S., the Rust Belt has no precise boundaries. The extent to which a community may have been described as a "Rust Belt city" depends on how great a role industrial manufacturing played in its local economy in the past and how it does now, as well as on perceptions of the economic viability and living standards of the present day.

News media occasionally refer to a patchwork of defunct centers of heavy industry and manufacturing across the Great Lakes and Midwestern United States as the snow belt, the manufacturing belt, or the factory belt because of their vibrant industrial economies in the past. This includes most of the cities of the Midwest as far west as the Mississippi River, including St. Louis, and many of those in the Great Lakes and Northern New York. At the center of this expanse lies an area stretching from northern Indiana and southern Michigan in the west to Upstate New York in the east, where local tax revenues as of 2004 relied more heavily on manufacturing than on any other sector.

Prior to World War II, cities in the Rust Belt region were among the largest in the U.S. However, by the end of the 20th century, their population had fallen the most in the country.

== History ==
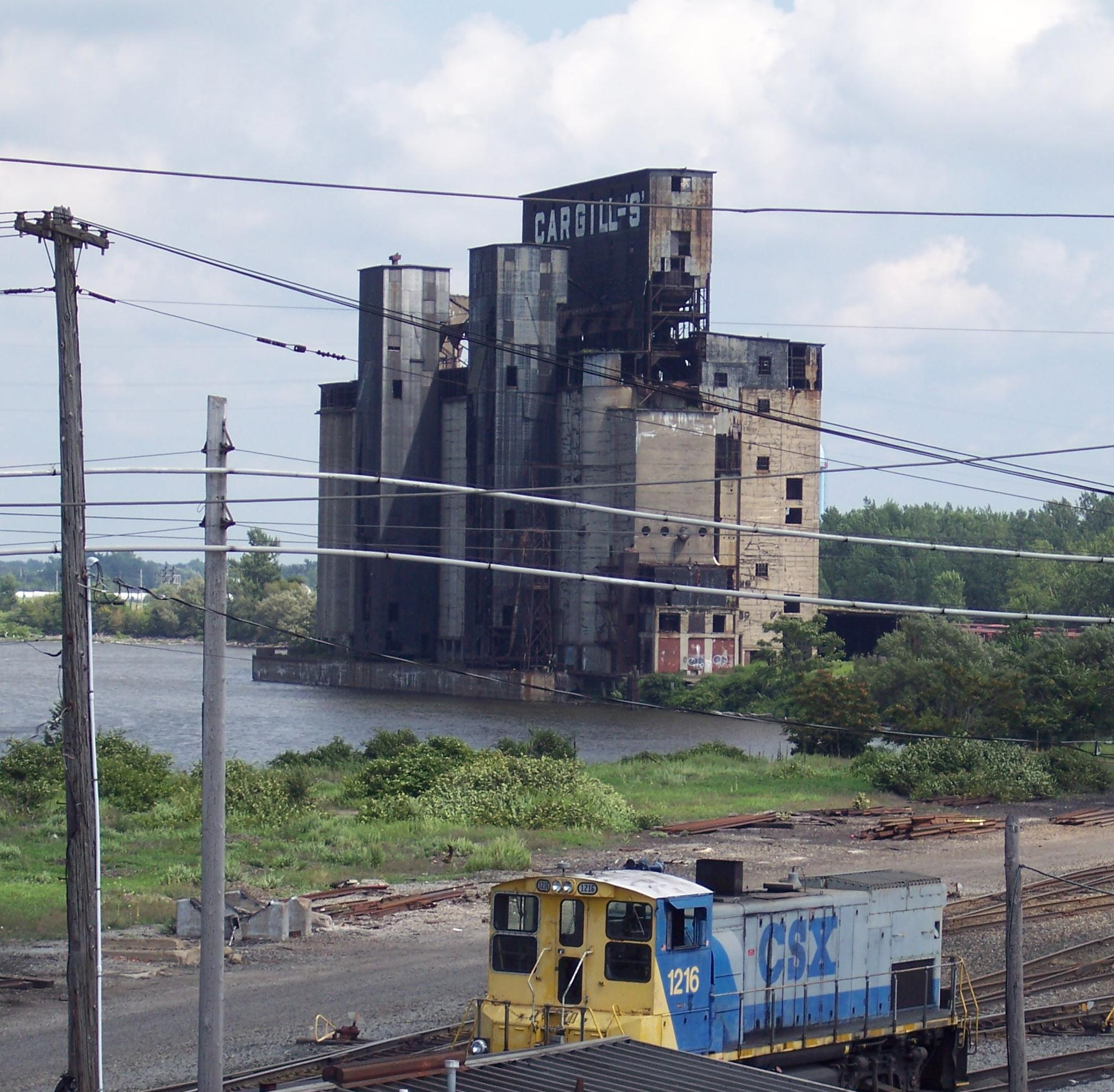
A disused grain elevator in Buffalo, New York

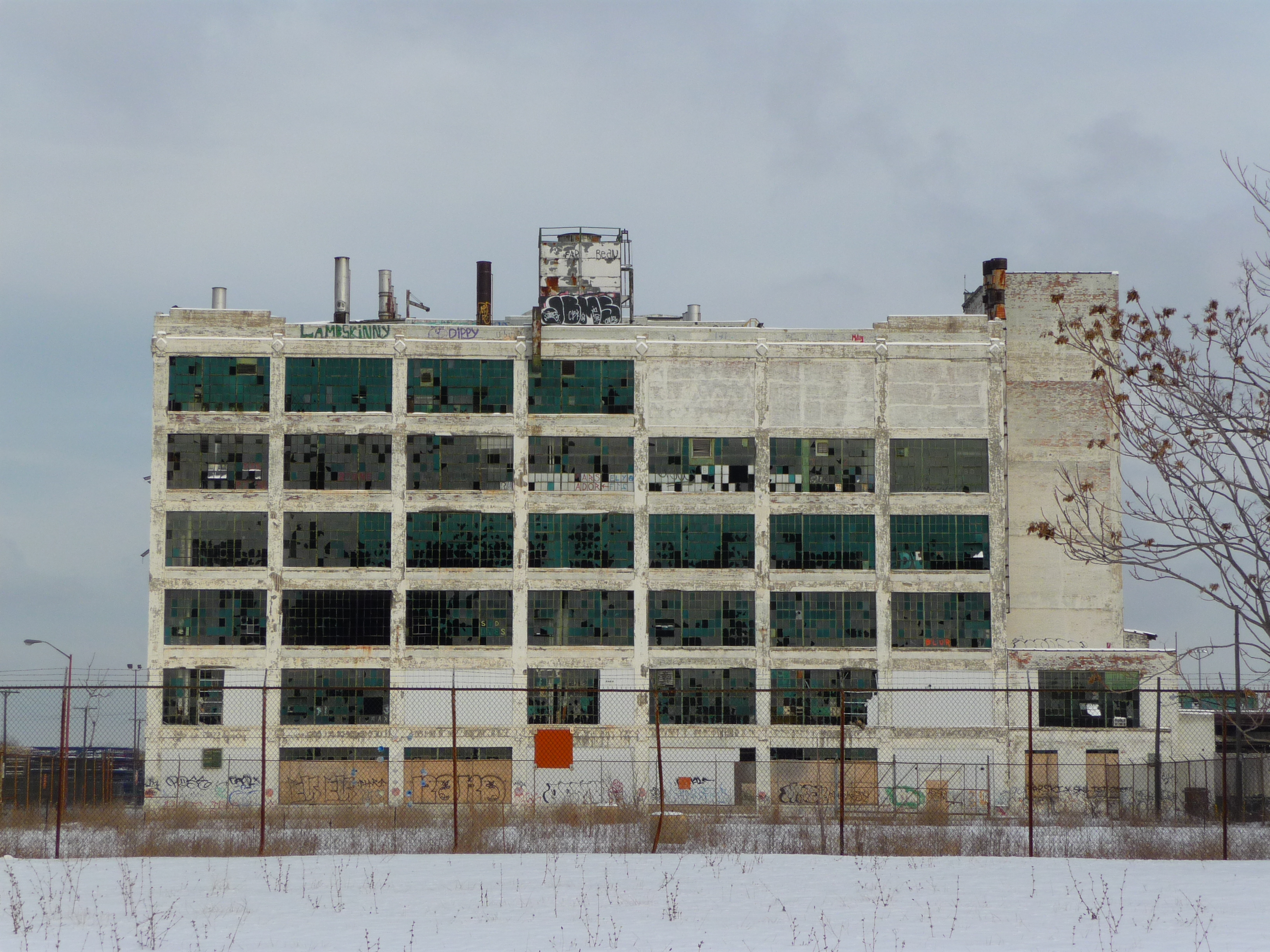
An abandoned Fisher auto body plant in Detroit

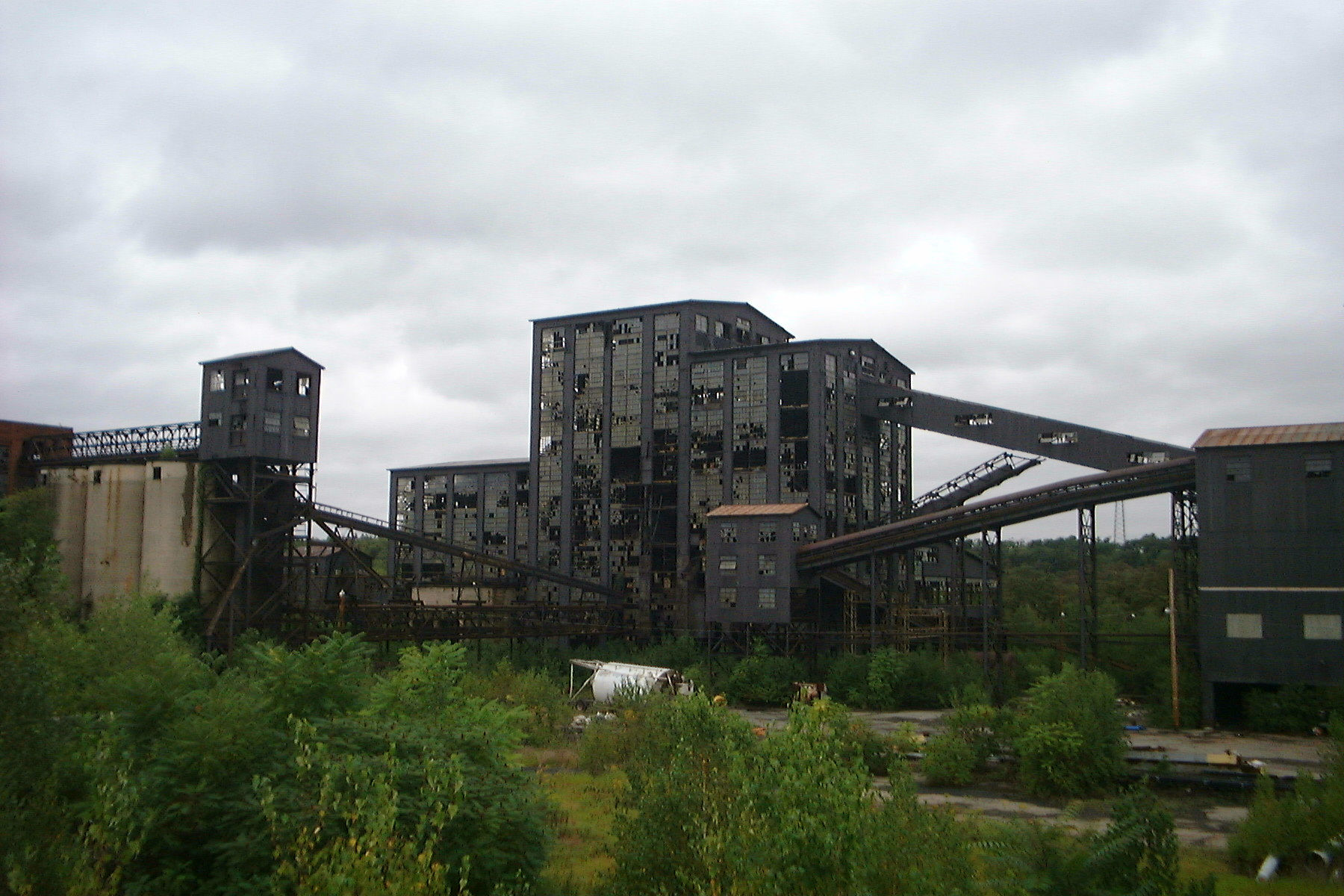
The Huber Breaker in Ashley, Pennsylvania, one of the largest anthracite coal breakers in North America; opened in the 1930s and closed in the 1970s.

The linking of the former Northwest Territory with the once-rapidly industrializing East Coast was effected through several large-scale infrastructural projects, most notably the Erie Canal in 1825, the Baltimore and Ohio Railroad in 1830, the Allegheny Portage Railroad in 1834, and the consolidation of the New York Central Railroad following the end of the American Civil War in 1875. A gate was opened between a variety of burgeoning industries on the interior North American continent and the markets of large East Coast cities and Western Europe.

Coal, iron ore, and other raw materials were shipped in from surrounding regions which emerged as major ports on the Great Lakes and served as transportation hubs for the region with proximity to railroad lines. Coming in the other direction were millions of European immigrants, who populated the cities along the Great Lakes shores with then-unprecedented speed. Chicago was a rural trading post in the 1840s but grew to be as big as Paris by the time of the 1893 Columbian Exposition.

Early signs of the difficulty in the northern states were evident early in the 20th century before the "boom years" were even over. Lowell, Massachusetts, once the center of textile production in the U.S., was described in the magazine Harper's as a "depressed industrial desert" as early as 1931, as its textile concerns were being uprooted and sent southward, primarily to the Carolinas.

In the first half of the 20th century, the Great Depression followed by American entry into World War II was followed by a rapid return to economic growth, during which much of the industrial North reached its peak population and industrial output.

The northern cities experienced changes that followed the end of World War II, with the onset of the outward migration of residents to newer suburban communities, and the declining role of manufacturing in the American economy.

Between 1969 and 1996 manufacturing employment declined by 32.9% in the Rust Belt, leading to severe dislocations in cities specialized in manufacturing. Imported goods such as steel cost much less to produce in Third World countries with cheap foreign labor (see steel crisis). The introduction of pollution regulation in the late 1960s, combined with rapidly increasing U.S. energy costs (see 1970s energy crisis) caused much U.S. heavy industry to begin moving to other countries. Beginning with the recession of 1970–71, a new pattern of deindustrializing economy emerged. Competitive devaluation combined with each successive downturn saw traditional U.S. manufacturing workers experiencing lay-offs. In general, in the Factory Belt employment in the manufacturing sector declined by 32.9% between 1969 and 1996.

In 1984, an incremental expansion of the U.S. trade deficit with China began combined with growing trade deficits with Japan, South Korea, and Taiwan. As a result, the traditional manufacturing workers in the region have experienced economic upheaval. This effect has devastated government budgets across the U.S. and increased corporate borrowing to fund retiree benefits. Some economists believe that GDP and employment can be dragged down by large long-run trade deficits.

== Deindustrialization and free trade ==
Studies by David Autor, David Dorn and Gordon Hanson show that increased free trade with China cost Americans around one million manufacturing workers between 1991 and 2007. Competition from Chinese imports has led to manufacturing job losses and declining wages. They also found that offsetting job gains in other industries never materialized. Closed companies no longer order goods and services from local non-manufacturing firms and former industrial workers may be unemployed for years or permanently. Increased import exposure reduces wages in the non-manufacturing sector due to lower demand for non-manufacturing goods and increased labor supply from workers who have lost their manufacturing jobs. Other work by this team of economists, with Daron Acemoglu and Brendan Price, estimates that competition from Chinese imports cost the U.S. as many as 2.4 million jobs in total between 1999 and 2011.

Avraham Ebenstein, Margaret McMillan, Ann Harrison also pointed out in their article “Why are American Workers getting Poorer? China, Trade and Offshoring” these negative effects of trade with China on American workers.

Although Autor, Dorn, and Hanson have documented the adverse effects of Chinese import competition on certain U.S. regions, they have emphasized that these findings reflect the broader impact of economic disruptions, including technological change and recessions, rather than trade alone. They do not dispute the overall economic benefits of free trade. Instead of advocating protectionist measures like tariffs, the authors argue that policy responses should focus on helping workers adapt to change.

Several empirical studies have challenged or nuanced the conclusions of the influential “China Shock” literature by David Autor, David Dorn, and Gordon Hanson, which attributes significant U.S. manufacturing job losses to rising Chinese import competition.

A general equilibrium model by Caliendo, Dvorkin, and Parro (2019) estimated that only around 15 percent of manufacturing job losses between 2000 and 2007 were attributable to the China Shock. Their analysis also found compensating gains in other sectors and regions, suggesting a more limited overall national impact.

Clément de Chaisemartin and Ziteng Lei (2023) identified a methodological flaw in the original 2013 Autor-Dorn-Hanson paper and found that, under a more robust empirical approach, Chinese imports did not cause statistically significant declines in U.S. manufacturing employment.

Other studies questioned the role of U.S. policy decisions such as the granting of permanent normal trade relations (PNTR) to China in 2000. George Alessandria and colleagues argued that the uncertainty surrounding China's trade status had already faded by the late 1990s, meaning PNTR had little practical effect on import flows. Similarly, Handley and Limão (2017) found that PNTR-induced policy certainty accounted for only one-third of Chinese export growth to the United States, with the remainder driven by China's own domestic reforms.

Mary Amiti et al. (2020) attributed around two-thirds of the U.S. manufacturing response to China's WTO accession to China's own tariff reductions, rather than U.S. trade liberalization. This view is supported by Zhi Wang and colleagues (2018), who found that while Chinese imports did lead to localized job losses, the aggregate effect on U.S. employment and wages was positive when supply-chain linkages were taken into account.

The consumer benefits of Chinese imports have also been emphasized. Xavier Jaravel and Erick Sager (2019) estimated that a one-percentage-point increase in imports from China reduced U.S. consumer prices by nearly two percentage points, leading to an average savings of $411,000 per lost manufacturing job — benefiting especially low- and middle-income households.

In a 2021 reassessment, Autor, Dorn, and Hanson themselves acknowledged these consumer benefits and revised their earlier conclusions. They found that once gains from lower prices were included, only about 6.3 percent of the U.S. population experienced net losses from Chinese import competition.

Further criticism has focused on the use of China Shock findings to justify protectionism. Jakubik and Stolzenburg (2023) argued that the China Shock literature has been misinterpreted in political debates and does not support current efforts to limit trade with China, especially given that the economic adjustment process has largely concluded.

Several authors, including Alan Reynolds, Philip Levy, and Charles Freeman, have emphasized that long-term factors such as automation, technological change, and global supply chains played a larger role in U.S. manufacturing decline than Chinese imports. They also noted that Chinese goods often displaced imports from other Asian countries, not domestic production.

== Outcomes ==
Every state that lost a House seat due to population loss following the 2020 census, except California, is part of the Rust Belt.

In 1999, Francis Fukuyama wrote that the social and cultural consequences of deindustrialization and manufacturing decline that turned a former thriving Factory Belt into a Rust Belt as a part of a bigger transitional trend that he called the Great Disruption: "People associate the information age with the advent of the Internet in the 1990s, but the shift from the industrial era started more than a generation earlier, with the deindustrialization of the Rust Belt in the United States and comparable movements away from manufacturing in other industrialized countries. … The decline is readily measurable in statistics on crime, fatherless children, broken trust, reduced opportunities for and outcomes from education, and the like".

Problems associated with the Rust Belt persist even today, particularly around the eastern Great Lakes states, and many once-booming manufacturing metropolises dramatically slowed down. From 1970 to 2006, Cleveland, Detroit, Buffalo, and Pittsburgh lost about 45% of their population and median household incomes fell: in Cleveland and Detroit by about 30%, in Buffalo by 20%, and Pittsburgh by 10%.

During the mid-1990s, several Rust Belt metropolitan areas experienced a suspension in negative growth, indicated by stabilizing unemployment, wages, and populations. During the first decade of the 21st century, however, a negative trend still persisted: Detroit, Michigan lost 25.7% of its population; Gary, Indiana, 22%; Youngstown, Ohio, 18.9%; Flint, Michigan, 18.7%; and Cleveland, Ohio, 14.5%.

The following table elaborates on the significant population decline in Rust Belt cities:

Population change in Rust Belt cities
City	County	State	Population change		Population		
City	County	State	2000 to 2020	peak to 2000 (years)	2020	2000	peak (year)
Akron	Summit	Ohio	-12.26%	-25.24% (40)	190,469	217,074	290,351 (1960)
Albany	Albany	New York	+3.66%	-29.14% (50)	99,224	95,658	134,995 (1950)
Amsterdam	Montgomery	New York	-0.74%	-47.28% (70)	18,219	18,355	34,817 (1930)
Anderson	Madison	Indiana	-8.28%	-15.61% (30)	54,788	59,734	70,787 (1970)
Altoona	Blair	Pennsylvania	-11.23%	-39.65% (70)	43,963	49,523	82,054 (1930)
Ashland	Boyd	Kentucky	-1.62%	-27.34% (40)	21,625	21,981	31,283 (1960)
Ashtabula	Ashtabula	Ohio	-14.25%	-13.78% (30)	17,975	20,962	24,313 (1970)
Baltimore	independent city	Maryland	-5.7%	-34.64% (50)	585,708	620,961	949,708 (1950)
Bay City	Bay	Michigan	-11.29%	-31.32% (40)	32,661	36,817	53,604 (1960)
Benton Harbor	Berrien	Michigan	-20.50%	-41.57% (40)	9,103	11,182	19,136 (1960)
Binghamton	Broome	New York	+1.24%	-41.27% (46)	47,969	47,380	80,674 (1954)
Buffalo	Erie	New York	-4.89%	-49.56% (50)	278,349	292,648	580,132 (1950)
Burlington	Des Moines	Iowa	-10.65%	-17.24% (40)	23,982	26,839	32,430 (1960)
Butler	Butler	Pennsylvania	-10.71%	-38.22% (60)	13,502	15,121	24,477 (1940)
Camden	Camden	New Jersey	-10.15%	-35.85% (50)	71,791	79,904	124,555 (1950)
Canton	Stark	Ohio	-12.29%	-30.88% (50)	70,872	80,806	116,912 (1950)
Charleston	Kanawha	West Virginia	-8.53%	-37.73% (40)	48,864	53,421	85,796 (1960)
Chester	Delaware	Pennsylvania	-11.53%	-44.19% (50)	32,605	36,854	66,039 (1950)
Chicago	Cook	Illinois	-5.17%	-20.02% (50)	2,746,388	2,896,016	3,620,962 (1950)
Chillicothe	Ross	Ohio	+1.21%	-12.67% (30)	22,059	21,796	24,957 (1970)
Cincinnati	Hamilton	Ohio	-6.63%	-34.27% (50)	309,317	331,285	503,998 (1950)
Clarksburg	Harrison	West Virginia	-4.20%	-47.7% (50)	16,039	16,743	32,014 (1950)
Cleveland	Cuyahoga	Ohio	-22.11%	-47.7% (50)	372,624	478,403	914,808 (1950)
Clinton	Clinton	Iowa	-11.9%	-20% (40)	24,469	27,772	34,719 (1960)
Corning	Steuben	New York	-2.68%	-38.69% (50)	10,551	10,842	17,684 (1950)
Covington	Kenton	Kentucky	-5.55%	-33.53% (70)	40,961	43,370	65,252 (1930)
Cumberland	Allegany	Maryland	-11.35%	-45.5% (60)	19,076	21,518	39,483 (1940)
Danville	Vermilion	Illinois	-13.86%	-20.36% (30)	29,204	33,904	42,570 (1970)
Dayton	Montgomery	Ohio	-17.17%	-36.65% (40)	137,644	166,179	262,332 (1960)
Decatur	Macon	Illinois	-13.85%	-12.99% (20)	70,522	81,860	94,081 (1980)
Detroit	Wayne	Michigan	-32.81%	-48.57% (50)	639,111	951,270	1,849,568 (1950)
DuBois	Clearfield	Pennsylvania	-7.55%	-40.63% (80)	7,510	8,123	13,681 (1920)
Duluth	Saint Louis	Minnesota	-0.25%	-19% (40)	86,697	86,918	107,312 (1960)
East Saint Louis	Saint Clair	Illinois	-41.45%	-61.71% (50)	18,469	31,542	82,366 (1950)
Elmira	Chemung	New York	-14.28%	-37.77% (50)	26,523	30,940	49,716 (1950)
Endicott	Broome	New York	+4.82%	-34.97% (50)	13,667	13,038	20,050 (1950)
Erie	Erie	Pennsylvania	-8.58%	-25.08% (40)	94,831	103,717	138,440 (1960)
Evansville	Vanderburgh	Indiana	-3.53%	-14.1%(40)	117,298	121,582	141,543 (1960)
Fairmont	Marion	West Virginia	-3.57%	-34.92% (50)	18,416	19,097	29,346 (1950)
Fall River	Bristol	Massachusetts	+2.21%	-23.69% (80)	94,000	91,938	120,485 (1920)
Flint	Genesee	Michigan	-34.97%	-36.56% (40)	81,252	124,943	196,940 (1960)
Franklin	Venango	Pennsylvania	-14.80%	-29.75% (60)	6,097	7,156	10,187 (1940)
Galesburg	Knox	Illinois	-10.84%	-9.5% (40)	30,052	33,706	37,243 (1960)
Gary	Lake	Indiana	-31.97%	-42.38% (40)	69,903	102,746	178,320 (1960)
Gloversville	Fulton	New York	-1.83%	-34.78% (50)	15,131	15,413	23,634 (1950)
Granite City	Madison	Illinois	-11.99%	-23.07% (30)	27,549	31,301	40,685 (1970)
Hammond	Lake	Indiana	-6.22%	-25.65% (40)	77,879	83,048	111,698 (1960)
Hamtramck	Wayne	Michigan	+23.75%	-59.17% (70)	28,433	22,976	56,268 (1930)
Harrisburg	Dauphin	Pennsylvania	+2.35%	-45.33% (50)	50,099	48,950	89,544 (1950)
Harrisburg	Saline	Illinois	-16.64%	-37.09% (70)	8,219	9,860	15,659 (1930)
Hartford	Capitol	Connecticut	-0.43%	-31.47% (50)	121,054	121,578	177,397 (1950)
Highland Park	Wayne	Michigan	-46.39%	-68.38% (70)	8,977	16,746	52,959 (1930)
Huntington	Cabell	West Virginia	-9.70%	-40.39% (50)	46,482	51,475	86,353 (1950)
Ironton	Lawrence	Ohio	-5.71%	-31.36% (50)	10,571	11,211	16,333 (1950)
Jamestown	Chautauqua	New York	-9.51%	-29.73% (70)	28,712	31,730	45,155 (1930)
Johnson City	Broome	New York	-1.24%	-19.29% (50)	15,343	15,535	19,249 (1950)
Johnstown	Cambria	Pennsylvania	-22.99%	-64.49% (80)	18,411	23,906	67,327 (1920)
Johnstown	Fulton	New York	-3.61%	-22.08% (50)	8,204	8,511	10,923 (1950)
Lakewood	Cuyahoga	Ohio	-10.07%	-19.66% (70)	50,942	56,646	70,509 (1930)
Lima	Allen	Ohio	-11.23%	-25.41% (40)	35,579	40,081	53,734 (1960)
Little Falls	Herkimer	New York	-11.24%	-60.18% (80)	4,605	5,188	13,029 (1920)
Lorain	Lorain	Ohio	-6.74%	-12.19% (30)	64,028	68,652	78,185 (1970)
Mansfield	Richland	Ohio	-3.67%	-10.34% (30)	47,534	49,346	55,047 (1970)
Marietta	Washington	Ohio	-7.79%	-13.91% (30)	13,385	14,515	16,861 (1970)
Marion	Grant	Indiana	-9.61%	-20.92% (30)	28,310	31,320	39,607 (1970)
Mason City	Cerro Gordo	Iowa	+6.08%	-15.12% (40)	27,591	26,009	30,642 (1960)
Milwaukee	Milwaukee	Wisconsin	-3.31%	-19.47% (30)	577,222	596,974	741,324 (1970)
Monessen	Westmoreland	Pennsylvania	-20.68%	-57.22% (70)	6,876	8,669	20,268 (1930)
Muncie	Delaware	Indiana	-3.32%	-11.81% (20)	65,194	67,430	76,460 (1980)
Muskegon	Muskegon	Michigan	-4.46%	-17.18% (50)	38,318	40,105	48,429 (1950)
New Bedford	Bristol	Massachusetts	+7.7%	-22.65% (80)	101,079	93,768	121,217 (1920)
Newark	Essex	New Jersey	+12.99%	-38.16% (70)	311,549	273,546	442,337 (1930)
Niagara Falls	Niagara	New York	-12.45%	-45.71% (40)	48,671	55,593	102,394 (1960)
Oil City	Venango	Pennsylvania	-16.48%	-47.89% (70)	9,608	11,504	22,075 (1930)
Olean	Cattaraugus	New York	-9.19%	-32.94% (40)	13,937	15,347	22,884 (1950)
Ottumwa	Wapello	Iowa	+2.12%	-26.2% (40)	25,529	24,998	33,871 (1960)
Parkersburg	Wood	West Virginia	-10.12%	-26.11% (40)	29,749	33,099	44,797 (1960)
Parma	Cuyahoga	Ohio	-5.26%	-14.53% (30)	81,146	85,655	100,216 (1970)
Peoria	Peoria	Illinois	+0.19%	-11.05% (30)	113,150	112,936	126,963 (1970)
Philadelphia	Philadelphia	Pennsylvania	+5.86%	-26.75% (50)	1,603,797	1,517,550	2,071,605 (1950)
Pittsburgh	Allegheny	Pennsylvania	-9.44%	-50.75% (50)	302,971	334,563	676,806 (1950)
Pittsfield	Berkshire	Massachusetts	-4.08%	-20.88% (40)	43,927	45,793	57,879 (1960)
Pontiac	Oakland	Michigan	-7.13%	-22.11% (30)	61,606	66,337	85,279 (1970)
Portsmouth	Scioto	Ohio	-12.71%	-50.87% (70)	18,252	20,909	42,560 (1930)
Providence	Providence	Rhode Island	+9.50%	-31.51% (60)	190,934	173,618	253,504 (1940)
Racine	Racine	Wisconsin	-4.93%	-13.98% (30)	77,816	81,855	95,162 (1970)
Richmond	Wayne	Indiana	-8.70%	-11.38% (20)	35,720	39,124	44,149 (1980)
Rochester	Monroe	New York	-3.71%	-33.99% (50)	211,328	219,474	332,488 (1950)
Rock Island	Rock Island	Illinois	-6.49%	-23.48% (40)	37,108	39,684	51,863 (1960)
Rome	Oneida	New York	-8.08%	-32.33% (40)	32,127	34,950	51,646 (1960)
Saginaw	Saginaw	Michigan	-28.47%	-37.11% (40)	44,202	61,799	98,265 (1960)
Saint Joseph	Berrien	Michigan	-11.21%	-25.23% (40)	7,856	8,789	11,755 (1960)
Saint Louis	independent city	Missouri	-13.39%	-59.36% (50)	301,578	348,189	856,796 (1950)
Sandusky	Erie	Ohio	-9.87%	-14.78% (30)	25,095	27,844	32,674 (1970)
Schenectady	Schenectady	New York	+8.45%	-35.4% (70)	67,047	61,821	95,692 (1930)
Scranton	Lackawanna	Pennsylvania	-0.11%	-46.72% (70)	76,328	76,415	143,433 (1930)
Somerville	Middlesex	Massachusetts	+4.5%	-25.44% (70)	81,045	77,478	103,908 (1930)
South Bend	Saint Joseph	Indiana	-4.02%	-18.62% (40)	103,453	107,789	132,445 (1960)
Springfield	Clark	Ohio	-10.25%	-20.99% (40)	58,662	65,358	82,723 (1960)
Springfield	Hampden	Massachusetts	+2.53%	-12.83%(40)	155,929	152,082	174,463 (1960)
Steubenville	Jefferson	Ohio	-4.49%	-49.5% (60)	18,161	19,015	37,651 (1940)
Superior	Douglas	Wisconsin	-2.25%	-32.23% (90)	26,751	27,368	40,384 (1910)
Syracuse	Onondaga	New York	+1.75%	-33.78% (50)	148,620	146,070	220,583 (1950)
Terre Haute	Vigo	Indiana	-2.06%	-16.96% (40)	58,389	59,614	71,786 (1960)
Toledo	Lucas	Ohio	-13.63%	-18.29% (30)	270,871	313,619	383,818 (1970)
Trenton	Mercer	New Jersey	+6.20%	-33.28% (50)	90,871	85,403	128,009 (1950)
Troy	Rensselaer	New York	+4.54%	-32% (50)	51,401	49,170	72,311 (1950)
Utica	Oneida	New York	+7.87%	-40.51% (70)	65,287	60,523	101,740 (1930)
Waterloo	Black Hawk	Iowa	-2.08%	-9.53% (20)	67,314	68,747	75,985 (1980)
Warren	Trumbull	Ohio	-16.29%	-26.2% (30)	39,201	46,832	63,494 (1970)
Weirton	Hancock	West Virginia	-6.11%	-27.62% (40)	19,163	20,411	28,201 (1960)
Wheeling	Ohio	West Virginia	-13.88%	-49.04% (70)	27,062	31,419	61,659 (1930)
Wilkes-Barre	Luzerne	Pennsylvania	+2.79%	-50.22% (70)	44,328	43,123	86,626 (1930)
Williamsport	Lycoming	Pennsylvania	-9.6%	-32.85% (40)	27,754	30,706	45,729 (1960)
Wilmington	New Castle	Delaware	-2.43%	-35.41% (60)	70,898	72,664	112,504 (1940)
Youngstown	Mahoning	Ohio	-26.77%	-51.75% (70)	60,068	82,026	170,002 (1930)
Zanesville	Muskingum	Ohio	-3.21%	-36.85% (50)	24,765	25,586	40,517 (1950)

Some of the manufacturing and industrial cities listed above have recovered population (like Pittsburgh and Syracuse), but only slightly and still well below their peak years. Many towns reliant on coal mining (such as most of West Virginia) declined earlier and thus have exacerbated problems associated with the Rust Belt. In the late 2000s, American manufacturing recovered faster from the Great Recession of 2008 than the other sectors of the economy, and a number of initiatives, both public and private, are encouraging the development of alternative fuel, nano and other technologies. Others have actually continued to grow in size despite an economic downturn by becoming satellite cities (Battle Creek, Janesville, Kokomo, Medina, Reading, Waukegan), or by absorbing a surrounding rural population (Allentown, Davenport, Findlay, Fort Wayne, Owensboro, Rockford). A disproportionate amount have also become college towns: including Akron, Bethlehem, Binghamton, Bloomington, Carbondale, Lafayette, Muncie, Providence, Somerville, South Bend, Utica, and Ypsilanti, among others.

Along with the neighboring Golden Horseshoe of southern Ontario, the Rust Belt composes one of the world's major manufacturing regions.

=== Transformation ===
Delving into the past and musing on the future of Rust Belt states, a 2010 Brookings Institution report suggests that the Great Lakes region has a sizable potential for transformation, citing already existing global trade networks, clean energy/low carbon capacity, developed innovation infrastructure, and higher educational network.

Different strategies were proposed in order to reverse the fortunes of the former Factory Belt including building casinos and convention centers, retaining the creative class through arts and downtown renewal, encouraging the knowledge economy type of entrepreneurship, and other steps. This includes growing new industrial base with a pool of skilled labor, rebuilding the infrastructure and infrasystems, creating research and development-focused university-business partnerships, and close cooperation between central, state and local government, and business.

New types of research and development-intensive nontraditional manufacturing have emerged recently in the Rust Belt, including biotechnology, the polymer industry, infotech, and nanotech. Information technology is seen as representing an opportunity for the Rust Belt's revitalization. Among the successful recent examples is the Detroit Aircraft Corporation, which specializes in unmanned aerial systems integration, testing and aerial cinematography services.

In Pittsburgh, robotics research centers and companies such as the National Robotics Engineering Center and Robotics Institute, Aethon Inc., American Robot Corporation, Automatika, Quantapoint, Blue Belt Technologies, and Seegrid are creating robotic technologies and applications. Akron, historically known as the "Rubber Capital of the World", lost 35,000 jobs after major tire and rubber manufacturers Goodrich, Firestone, and General Tire closed their production lines, but is now well known around the world again as a center of polymer research with four hundred polymer-related manufacturing and distribution companies operating in the area. One economic redevelopment project includes a partnership between Goodyear Tire & Rubber Company, the University of Akron, and the mayor's office. The Akron Global Business Accelerator, based in the refurbished B.F. Goodrich tire factory, created a score of business ventures in Akron.

Additive manufacturing, or 3D printing, has been applied to a growing range of industrial and consumer products. Companies such as MakerGear from Beachwood, Ohio, or ExOne Company from North Huntingdon, Pennsylvania, are designing and manufacturing industrial and consumer products using 3-D imaging systems.

In 2013, The Economist reported a growing trend of reshoring, or inshoring, of manufacturing when a growing number of American companies were moving their production facilities from overseas back home. Rust Belt states can ultimately benefit from this process of international insourcing.

There have also been attempts to reinvent properties in the Rust Belt in order to reverse its economic decline. Buildings with compartmentalization unsuitable for today's uses were acquired and renewed to facilitate new businesses. These business activities suggest that the revival is taking place in the once-stagnant area. The CHIPS and Science Act, which became effective in August 2022, was justified as an attempt to rebuild the manufacturing sector with thousands of jobs and research programs in states like Ohio focusing on making products like semiconductors due to the global chip shortage of the early 2020s.

== See also ==
- Corn Belt
- Decline of Detroit
- Deindustrialization
- Dutch disease
- Early 1980s recession in the United States
- Economy of Allentown, Pennsylvania
- Economy of the United States
- Economy of Youngstown, Ohio
- Modern ruins
- Outsourcing
- Shrinking city
- Snowbelt
- Steel City
- Steel crisis
- Sunbelt
- Urban decay
