= List of sister cities in Pennsylvania =

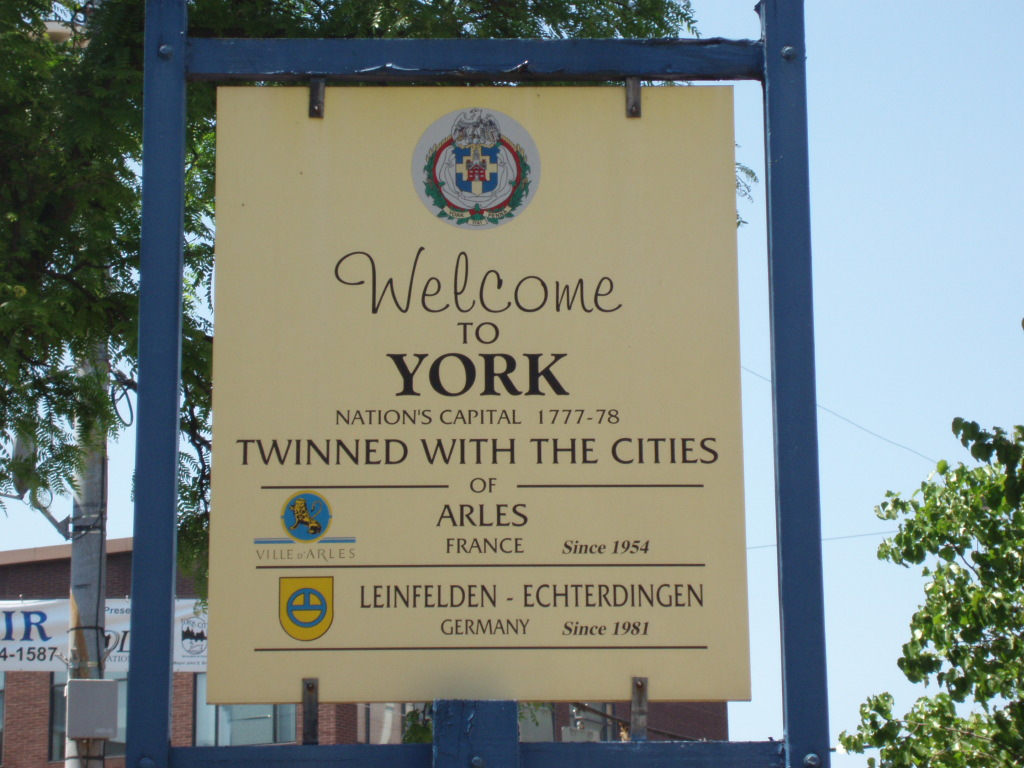
A sign with sister cities of York

This is a list of sister cities in the United States state of Pennsylvania. Sister cities, known in Europe as twin towns, are cities which partner with each other to promote human contact and cultural links, although this partnering is not limited to cities and often includes counties, regions, states and other sub-national entities.

Many Pennsylvania jurisdictions work with foreign cities through Sister Cities International, an organization whose goal is to "promote peace through mutual respect, understanding, and cooperation."

== A ==
Allentown

- Lelów, Poland
- Santo Domingo Este, Dominican Republic
- Tiberias, Israel
- Vinci, Italy

Altoona

- Sankt Pölten, Austria

Ambler

- Maida, Italy

== B ==
Bethlehem

- Corfu, Greece
- Foiano di Val Fortore, Italy
- Murska Sobota, Slovenia
- Schwäbisch Gmünd, Germany
- Tondabayashi, Japan

Boyertown

- Bohodukhiv, Ukraine

Bridgeport

- Longano, Italy

== C ==
Caln Township

- Calne, England, United Kingdom

Chambersburg

- Gotemba, Japan

Cheltenham Township

- Cheltenham, England, United Kingdom

Clarks Summit

- Ystradgynlais, Wales, United Kingdom

Cranberry Township

- Haiyang, China

== D ==
Dalton

- Dalton-in-Furness, England, United Kingdom

Downingtown

- Bradninch, England, United Kingdom

Drumore Township

- Dromore, Northern Ireland, United Kingdom

== E ==
East Norriton Township

- Treptow-Köpenick (Berlin), Germany

Elizabethtown

- (Republic of Ireland) Letterkenny, Ireland

Ephrata

- Eberbach, Germany

Erie

- Chornomorsk, Ukraine
- (Republic of Ireland) Dungarvan, Ireland
- Lublin, Poland
- Mérida, Mexico
- Zibo, China

== F ==
Fleetwood

- Fleetwood, England, United Kingdom

== G ==
Gettysburg

- Gettysburg, South Dakota, United States
- León, Nicaragua
- Morelia, Mexico
- Sainte-Mère-Église, France
- Sekigahara, Japan

Greensburg

- Cercemaggiore, Italy

== H ==
Harrisburg

- Ma'alot-Tarshiha, Israel

Hazleton

- Bussento - Lambro e Mingardo, Italy

== K ==
Kennett Square

- Moroleón, Mexico

Kutztown

- Altrip, Germany

== L ==
Lancaster

- Beit Shemesh, Israel
- Sano, Japan

Limerick Township

- (Republic of Ireland) Limerick, Ireland

Lititz

- Kunvald, Czech Republic

== M ==
Monongahela

- Ono San Pietro, Italy

== N ==
New Holland

- Longvic, France

Norristown

- Montella, Italy

Northampton

- Stegersbach, Austria

== P ==
Philadelphia

- Abruzzo, Italy
- Aix-en-Provence, France
- Douala, Cameroon
- Florence, Italy
- Frankfurt am Main, Germany
- Incheon, South Korea
- Nizhny Novgorod, Russia
- Tel Aviv, Israel
- Tianjin, China
- Toruń, Poland

Pittsburgh

- Bilbao, Spain
- Da Nang, Vietnam
- Fernando de la Mora, Paraguay
- Gaziantep, Turkey
- Karmiel, Israel
- Matanzas, Cuba
- Misgav, Israel
- Naucalpan, Mexico
- Ostrava, Czech Republic
- Prešov, Slovakia
- Saitama, Japan
- San Isidro, Nicaragua
- Sheffield, England, United Kingdom
- Skopje, North Macedonia
- Sofia, Bulgaria
- Wuhan, China
- Zagreb, Croatia

== R ==
Reading

- Reutlingen, Germany

Roseto

- Roseto Valfortore, Italy

== S ==
Saxonburg

- Mühlhausen, Germany

Scranton

- (Republic of Ireland) Ballina, Ireland
- Guardia Lombardi, Italy

== W ==
Warminster Township

- Warminster, England, United Kingdom

Williamsport

- Ma'ale Adumim, West Bank

== Y ==
York

- Arles, France
- Leinfelden-Echterdingen, Germany
