= Economy of Allentown, Pennsylvania =

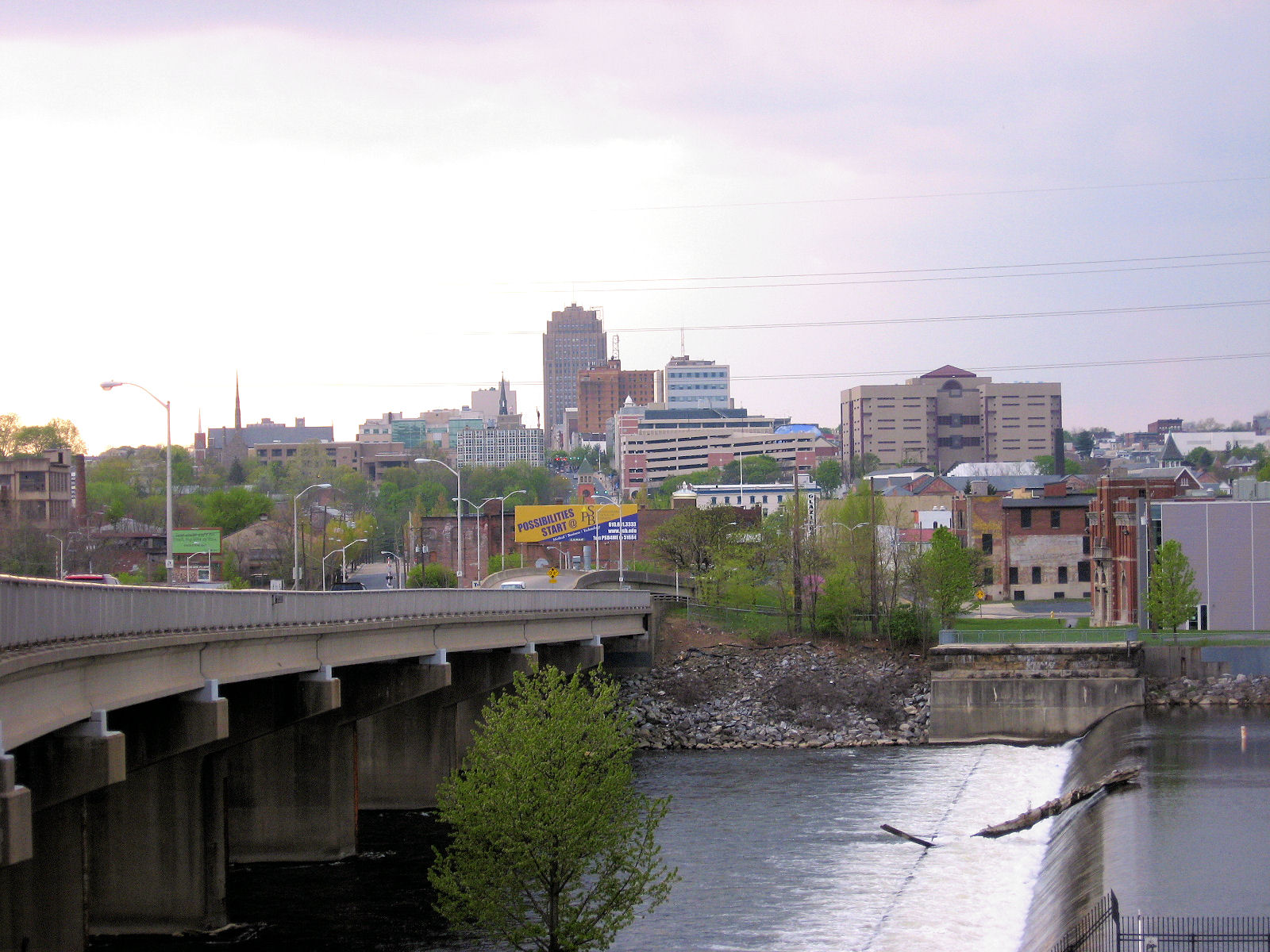
Allentown, the largest city in the Lehigh Valley, third-largest city in Pennsylvania, and county seat of Lehigh County in May 2010

Allentown, Pennsylvania is the home for the global and U.S. corporate headquarters of several companies, including Air Products, PPL Corporation, and others. The largest employer in the Lehigh Valley is Lehigh Valley Health Network with almost 8,000 employees.

== Tourism and activities ==
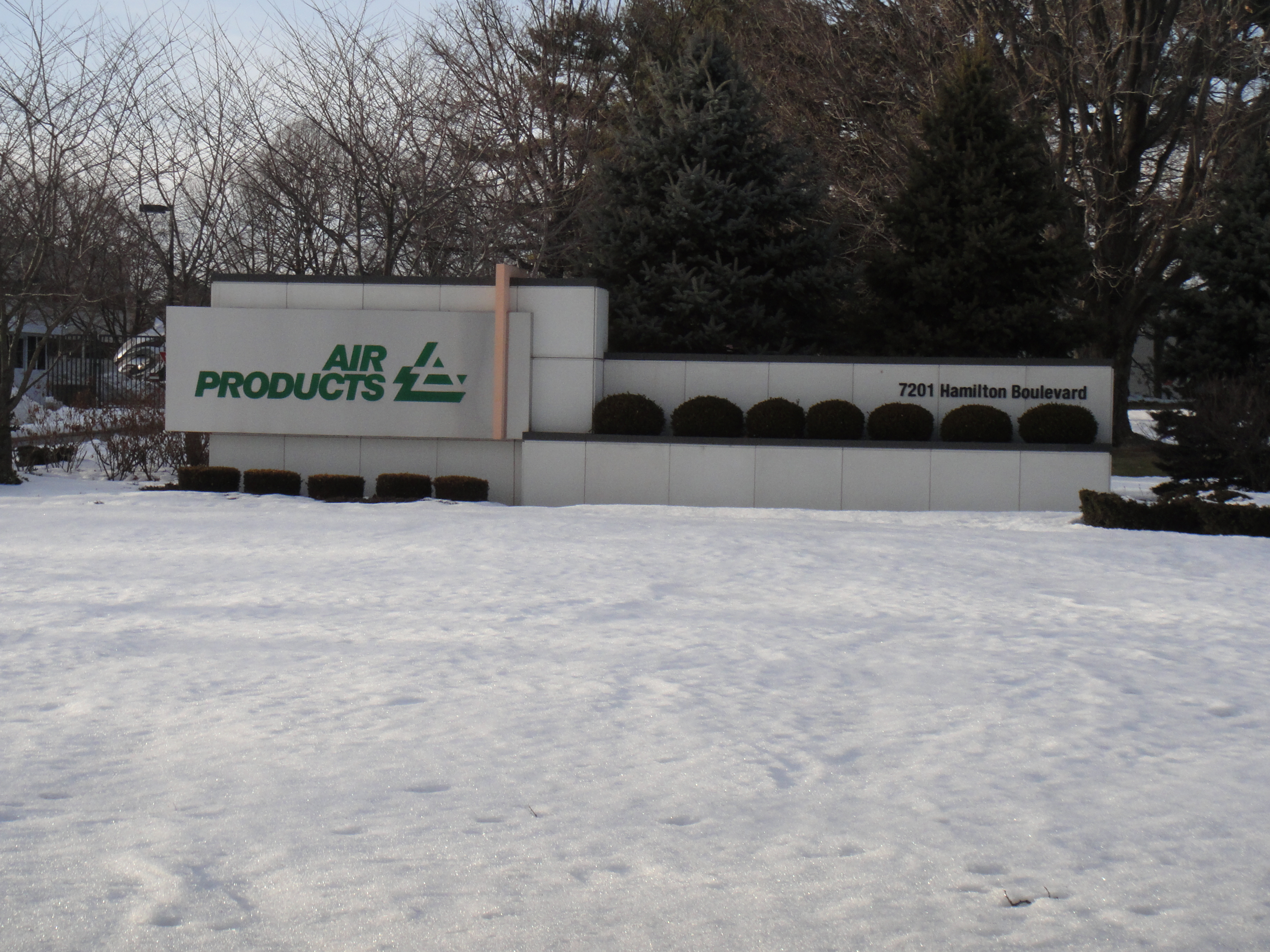
The global headquarters of Air Products, an $8.8 billion S&P 500 company headquartered outside Allentown in Trexlertown, Pennsylvania, March 2014

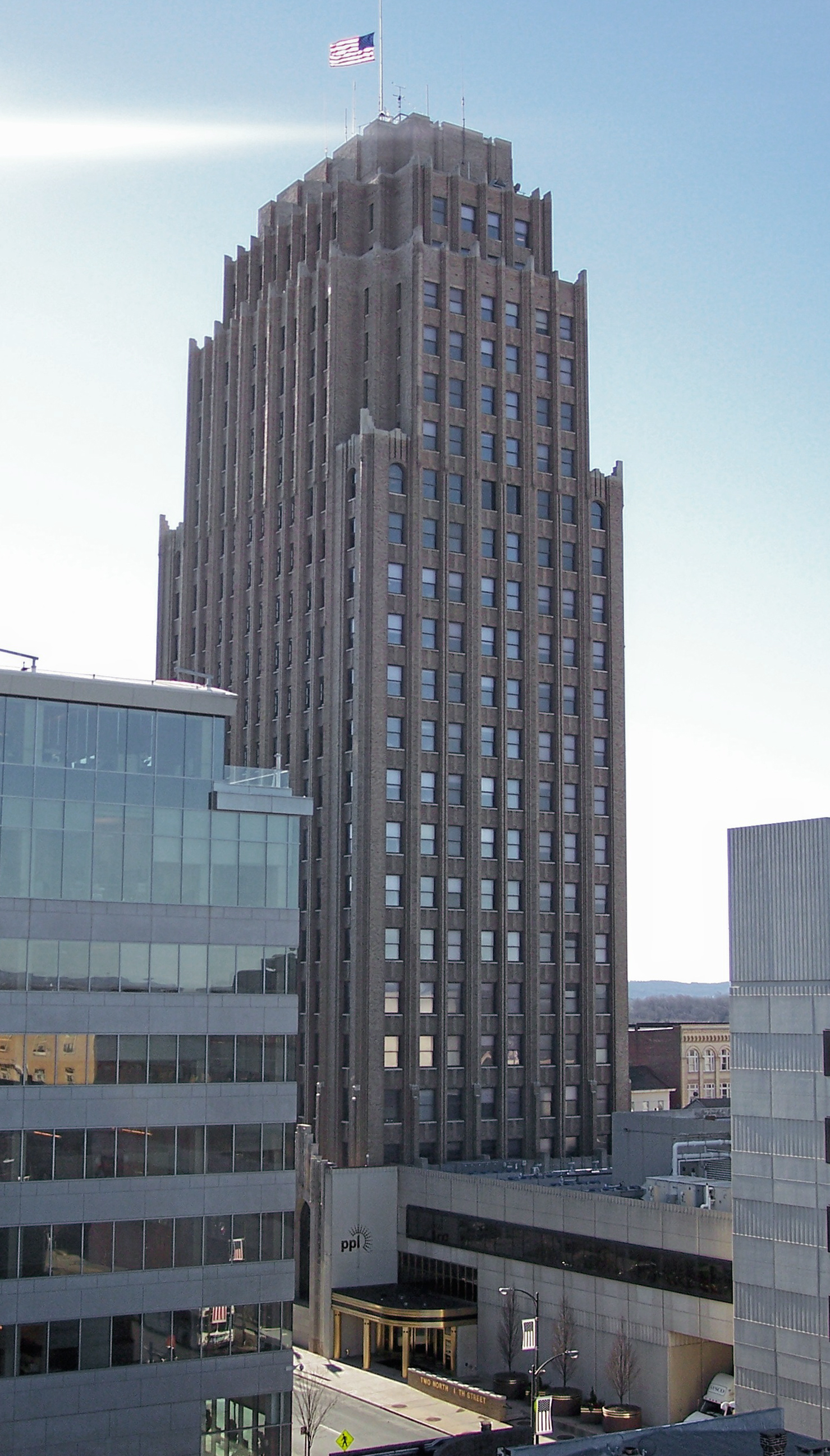
The corporate headquarters of PPL Corporation, a $7.6 billion S&P 500 company in Center City Allentown, January 2007

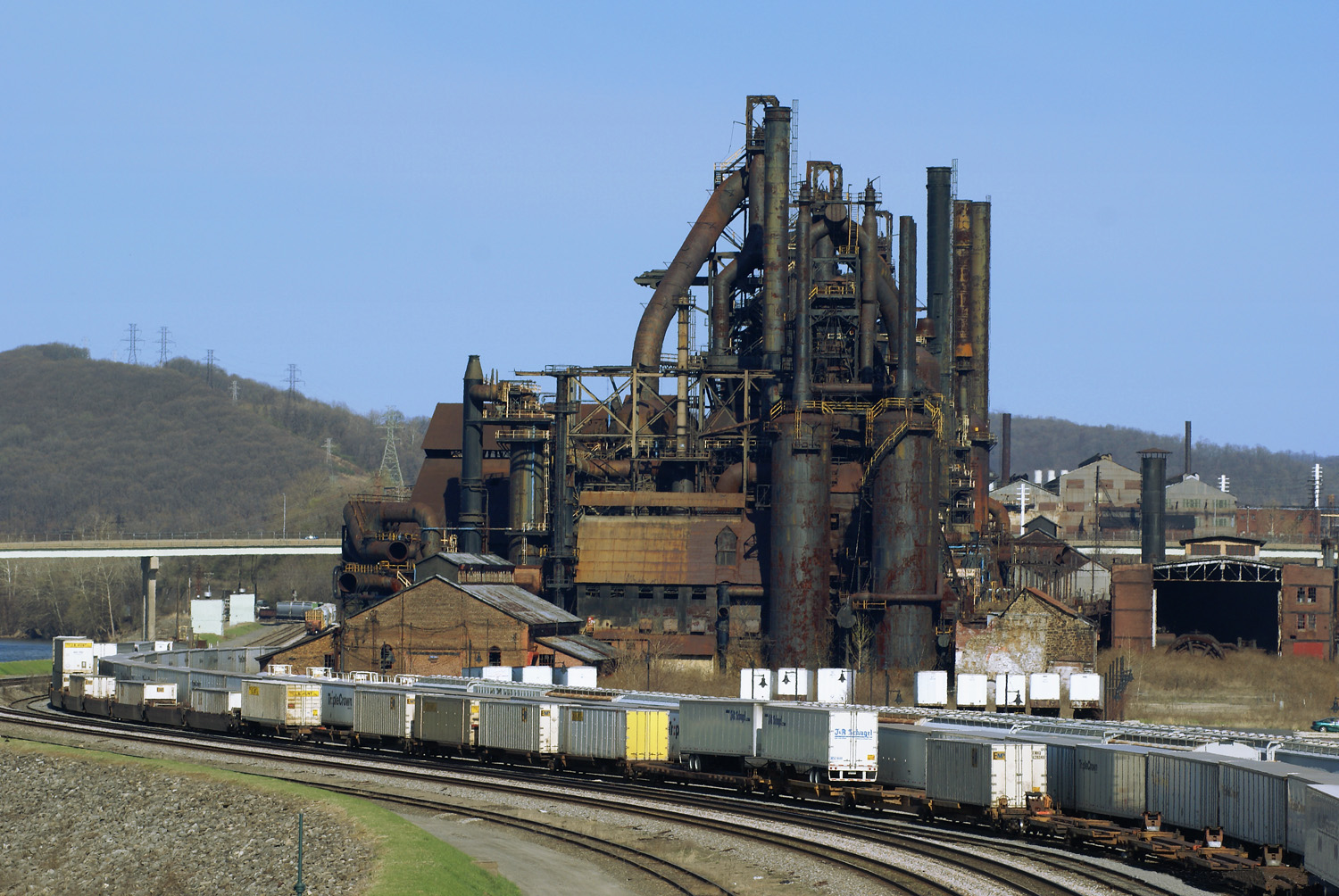
Bethlehem Steel in Bethlehem was the second largest steel manufacturer in the United States and one of the Lehigh Valley's largest employers until it began downsizing in the 1980s, ultimately declaring bankruptcy in 2001.

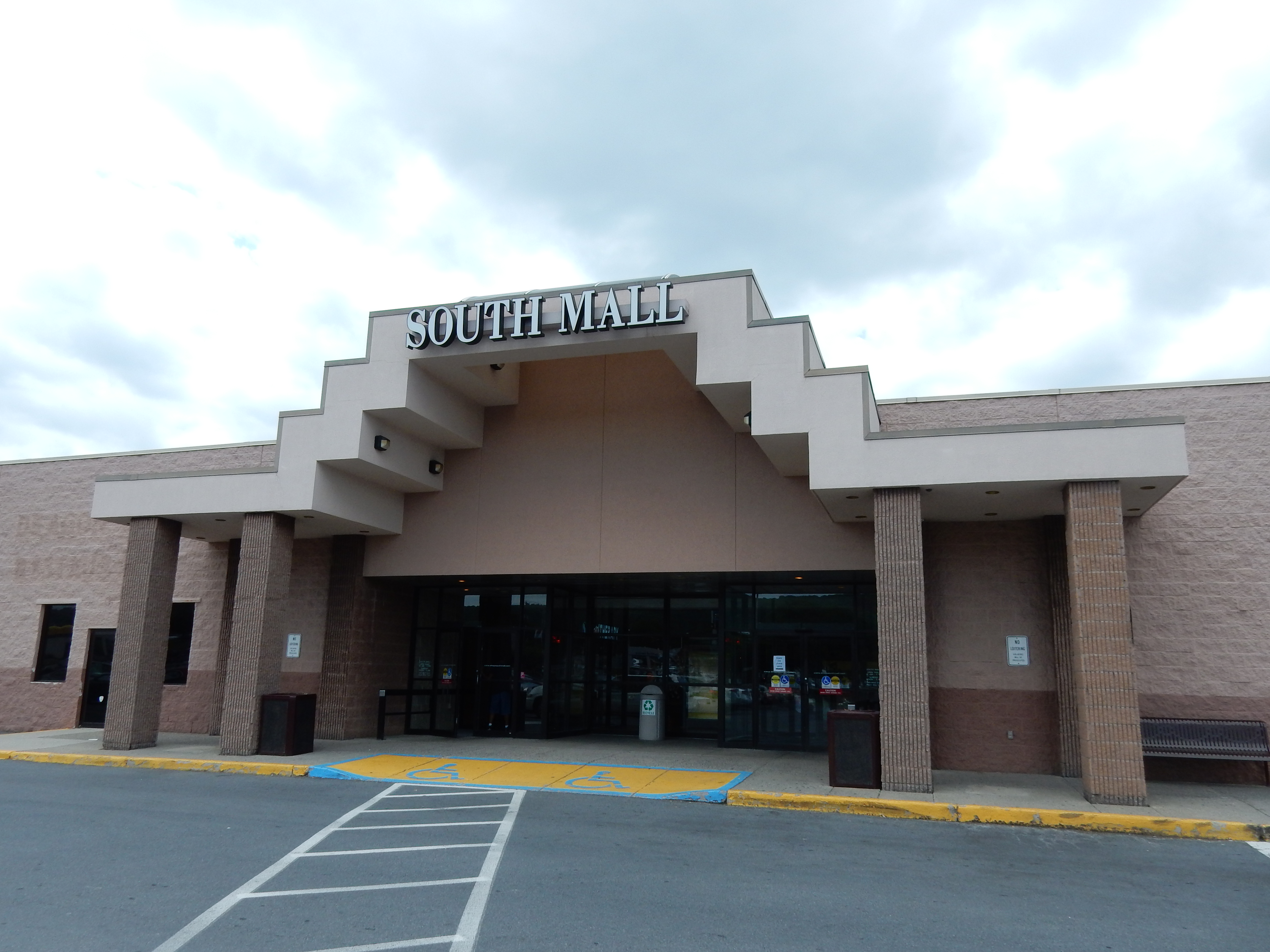
South Mall on Lehigh Street outside Allentown, one of several Allentown-area shopping malls, June 2015

The arrival of two professional athletics teams in the 21st century have helped bolster the Allentown economy, which has historically been considered part of the Rust Belt. In Center City Allentown, PPL Center, an 8,500-capacity indoor arena, opened in September 2014 as the new home for the Lehigh Valley Phantoms of the American Hockey League, the primary development team of the National Hockey League's Philadelphia Flyers. PPL Center also hosts major concerts and entertainment events. In East Allentown, Coca-Cola Park, a 10,178-capacity baseball stadium, opened in March 2008 as the new home for the Lehigh Valley IronPigs of the International League, the Triple-A-level Minor League affiliate of the Philadelphia Phillies of Major League Baseball.

Previously established attractions include the Allentown Art Museum, which completed a $15.4 million expansion projected in 2010–11, and the Baum School of Art, the city's primary art school. Several Allentown-based universities, including Cedar Crest College and Muhlenberg College, attract scholars and academics from all over the country.

== Shopping ==
The city and its suburbs have several shopping malls, including Lehigh Valley Mall (the largest in the region) and Whitehall Plaza (formerly Whitehall Mall), both located in Whitehall Township, South Mall on Lehigh Street in Salisbury Township, and Promenade Saucon Valley in Center Valley.

== Companies and corporations ==
The following is a list of corporations based in Allentown and the surrounding Lehigh Valley metropolitan area:

- Air Products (Trexlertown)
- Buckeye Partners (U.S. headquarters) (Breinigsville)
- Crayola (Easton)
- Just Born (Bethlehem)
- Lehigh Valley Hospital–Cedar Crest (Allentown)
- Norfolk Southern Railway
- Olympus (U.S. headquarters) (Center Valley)
- PPL Corporation (Allentown)
- HNL Lab Medicine (Allentown)

== Former corporations ==
The following is a list of companies formerly headquartered in Allentown and the surrounding area:

- Bethlehem Steel
- Hess's
- Mack Trucks

== See also ==
- Allentown, Pennsylvania
- Lehigh Valley
