= List of invasive plant species in Pennsylvania =

Numerous plants have been introduced to the US state of Pennsylvania in the last four hundred years and many of them have become invasive species that compete with the native plants and suppress their growth.

== Description ==
Invasive species are often grouped by threat levels that vary from county to county from very high impact to remarkable increased growth. The species below are by no means comprehensive and are listed in type order rather than level of threat

The Pennsylvania Department of Conservation and Natural Resources ranks invasive species into 3 categories based on urgency of threat.

=== Terrestrial Plants and Trees ===
Picture	Scientific Name	Common Name
	Acer platanoides	Norway maple
	Ailanthus altissima	tree of heaven
	Alliaria petiolata	garlic mustard
	Aralia elata	Japanese Angelica tree
	Berberis thunbergii	Japanese barberry
	Euonymus alatus	Winged Spindle
	Lonicera japonica	Japanese honeysuckle
	Phragmites	
	Reynoutria japonica	Japanese knotweed
	Rhamnus cathartica	Buckthorn
	Rhodotypos scandens	Jetbead
	Rosa multiflora	Multiflora Rose
	Rubus phoenicolasius	Japanese wineberry
	Saccharum ravennae	Ravenngrass
	Frangula alnus	Alder Buckthorn
	Galega officinalis	goat's-rue
	Heracleum mantegazzianum	Giant Hogweed
	Phellodendron	Cork-Tree
	Pueraria	Kudzu
	Vincetoxicum nigrum	Black Swallowwort
	Vincetoxicum rossicum	Pale Swallowwort
	Morus alba	White Mulberry

== See also ==
- Invasive species in the United States
