= List of mammals of Pennsylvania =

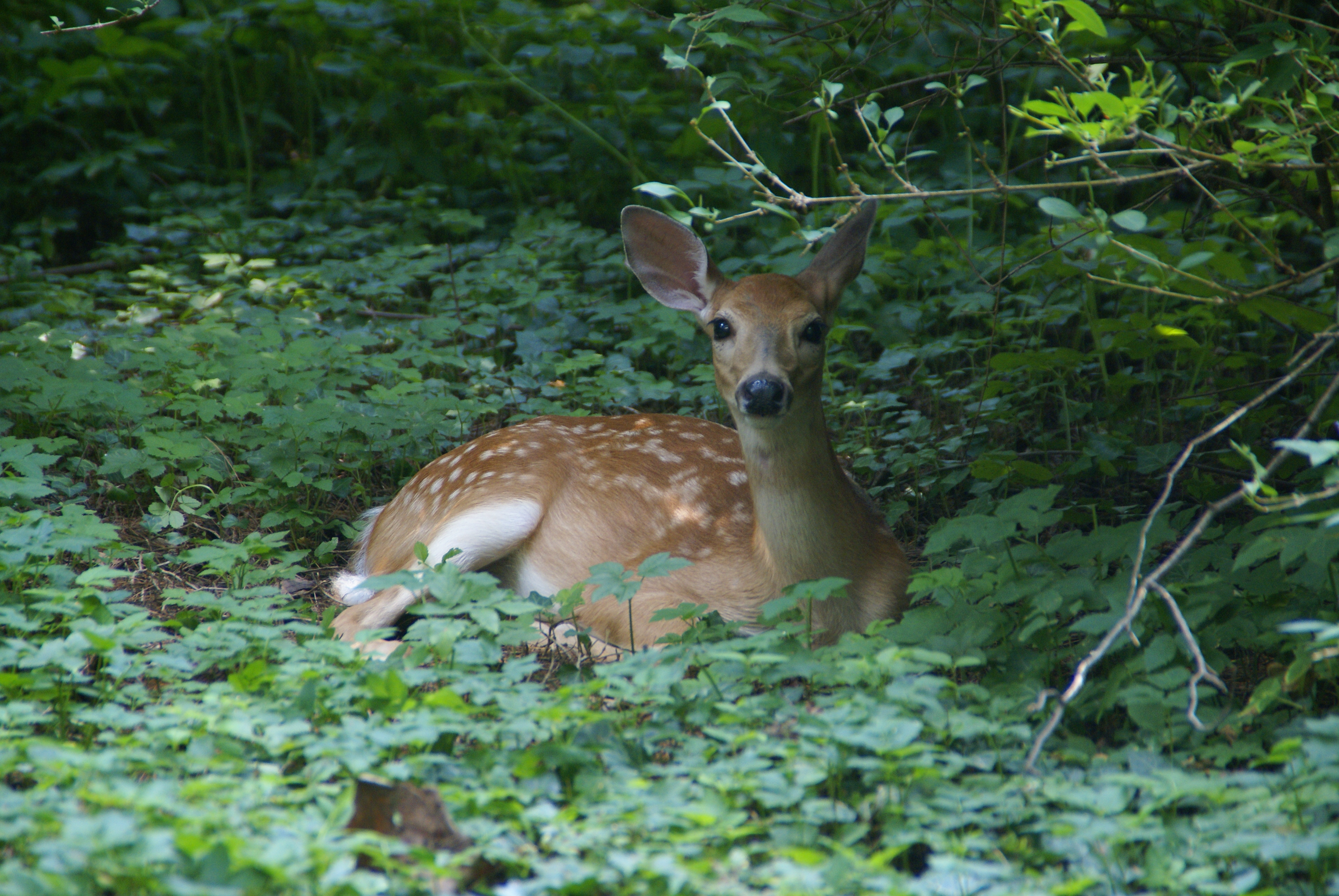
A white-tailed deer, the state animal of Pennsylvania, in Berwyn, Pennsylvania

This list of mammals in Pennsylvania consists of 66 species currently believed to occur wild in the state. This excludes feral domesticated species such as feral cats and dogs.

Several species recently lived wild in Pennsylvania, but are now extirpated (locally, but not globally, extinct). They are the marsh rice rat (Oryzomys palustris), eastern wolf (Canis lycaon), American marten (Martes americana), wolverine (Gulo gulo), cougar (Puma concolor), Canada lynx (Lynx canadensis), moose (Alces alces), and bison (Bison bison).

== Opossums ==
Order: Didelphimorphia

Family: Didelphidae

One species of opossum occurs in Pennsylvania.

Common name	Scientific name	Status	Notes	Distribution
Virginia opossum	Didelphis virginiana	Common	D. virginiana virginiana	Statewide

== Shrews and moles ==
Order: Eulipotyphla

Family: Soricidae

Seven species of shrews live in Pennsylvania.

Common name	Scientific name	Status	Notes	Distribution
Northern short-tailed shrew	Blarina brevicauda	Common		Statewide
Least shrew	Cryptotis parva	Endangered locally		South central
Masked shrew	Sorex cinereus	Common		Statewide
Maryland shrew	Sorex cinereus fontinalis	Common	The Maryland shrew is now considered a subspecies of masked shrew.	Piedmont and Valley and Ridge
Long-tailed shrew	Sorex dispar	Rare		Appalachian Uplands
Smoky shrew	Sorex fumeus	Common		Statewide
Pygmy shrew	Sorex hoyi	Uncommon		Presumed statewide
Water shrew	Sorex palustris	Uncommon		Mountain streams

Family: Talpidae

Three species of moles occur in Pennsylvania.

Common name	Scientific name	Status	Notes	Distribution
Star-nosed mole	Condylura cristata	Uncommon		Statewide
Hairy-tailed mole	Parascalops breweri	Uncommon		Statewide
Eastern mole	Scalopus aquaticus	Uncommon		Piedmont and Valley and Ridge

== Bats ==
Order: Chiroptera

Family: Vespertilionidae

Eleven species of evening bats occur in Pennsylvania.

Common name	Scientific name	Status	Notes	Distribution
Tri-colored bat	Perimyotis subflavus	Uncommon		Statewide
Big brown bat	Eptesicus fuscus	Common		Statewide
Evening bat	Nycticeius humeralis	Rare		Southeastern
Red bat	Lasiurus borealis	Uncommon		Statewide
Seminole bat	Lasiurus seminolus	Rare		Piedmont
Hoary bat	Lasiurus cinereus	Uncommon		Statewide
Small-footed myotis	Myotis leibii	Threatened locally		Statewide
Northern long-eared bat	Myotis septentrionalis			Statewide
Little brown myotis	Myotis lucifugus	Common		Statewide
Indiana bat	Myotis sodalis	Endangered		Central
Silver-haired bat	Lasionycteris noctivagans	Uncommon		Statewide

== Rabbits and hares ==
Order: Lagomorpha

Family: Leporidae

Three species of rabbits and hares occur in Pennsylvania.

Common name	Scientific name	Status	Notes	Distribution
Eastern cottontail	Sylvilagus floridanus	Common		Statewide
Appalachian cottontail	Sylvilagus obscurus	Uncommon		Eastern mountains
Snowshoe hare	Lepus americanus	Rare		Appalachian Uplands
European hare	Lepus europaeus	Common	Introduced	Northeastern area

== Rodents ==
Order: Rodentia

Family: Castoridae

One species of beaver occurs in Pennsylvania.

Common name	Scientific name	Status	Notes	Distribution
North American beaver	Castor canadensis	Reintroduced		Statewide

Family: Myocastoridae

One species of porcupine occurs in Pennsylvania.

Common name	Scientific name	Status	Notes	Distribution
North American porcupine	Erethizon doratum	Uncommon		Northern and central

Family: Zapodidae

Two species of jumping mice occur in Pennsylvania.

Common name	Scientific name	Status	Notes	Distribution
Woodland jumping mouse	Napaeozapus insignis	Common		Northern and western
Meadow jumping mouse	Zapus hudsonius	Common		Statewide

Family: Cricetidae

Nine species of voles and New World rats and mice occur in Pennsylvania.

Subfamily Arvicolinae (lemmings, voles, and muskrats)

Common name	Scientific name	Status	Notes	Distribution
Rock vole	Microtus chrotorrhinus	Rare		Northeast
Meadow vole	Microtus pennsylvanicus	Common		Statewide
Woodland vole	Microtus pinetorum	Common		Statewide
Southern bog lemming	Synaptomys cooperi	Uncommon		Statewide
Southern red-backed vole	Clethrionomys gapperi	Common		Statewide
Muskrat	Ondatra zibethicus	Common		Statewide

Subfamily Neotominae (North American rats and mice)

Common name	Scientific name	Status	Notes	Distribution
Allegheny woodrat	Neotoma magister	Threatened		Mountain ridges
Eastern deer mouse	Peromyscus maniculatus	Common		Statewide
White-footed mouse	Peromyscus leucopus	Common		Statewide

Family: Muridae

Three species of Old World rats and mice occur in Pennsylvania.

Common name	Scientific name	Status	Notes	Distribution
House mouse	Mus musculus	Introduced		Statewide
Brown rat	Rattus norvegicus	Introduced		Statewide
Black rat	Rattus rattus	Introduced		Statewide

Family: Sciuridae

Eight species of squirrels, chipmunks, and marmots occur in Pennsylvania.

Subfamily Sciurinae (tree squirrels and flying squirrels)

Common name	Scientific name	Status	Notes	Distribution
Eastern gray squirrel	Sciurus carolinensis	Common		Statewide
Fox squirrel	Sciurus niger	Uncommon		Southern and western
American red squirrel	Tamiasciurus hudsonicus	Common		Statewide
Northern flying squirrel	Glaucomys sabrinus	Rare		Northern
Southern flying squirrel	Glaucomys volans	Common		Statewide

Subfamily Xerinae (chipmunks and ground squirrels)

Common name	Scientific name	Status	Notes	Distribution
Groundhog	Marmota monax	Common		Statewide
Thirteen-lined ground squirrel	Ictidomys tridecemlineatus	Introduced		Mercer and Venango Counties
Eastern chipmunk	Tamias striatus	Common		Statewide

== Carnivorans ==
Order: Carnivora

Family: Felidae

One species of cat occurs in Pennsylvania.

Common name	Scientific name	Status	Notes	Distribution
Bobcat	Lynx rufus	Rare	L. rufus rufus	Appalachian Uplands

Family: Canidae

Three species of canids occur in Pennsylvania.

Common name	Scientific name	Status	Notes	Distribution
Coyote	Canis latrans	Common	Eastern coyote, C. latrans ssp.	Statewide
Gray fox	Urocyon cinereoargenteus	Common		Statewide
Red fox	Vulpes vulpes	Common	Eastern American red fox, V. vulpes fulvus	Statewide

Family: Ursidae

One species of bear occurs in Pennsylvania.

Common name	Scientific name	Status	Notes	Distribution
Black bear	Ursus americanus	Common	U. americanus americanus	Appalachian Mountains in Central Pennsylvania

Family: Mephitidae

Two species of skunks occur in Pennsylvania.

Common name	Scientific name	Status	Notes	Distribution
Striped skunk	Mephitis mephitis	Common		Statewide
Eastern spotted skunk	Spilogale putorius	Rare		South central

Family: Mustelidae

Seven species of mustelids occur in Pennsylvania.

Common name	Scientific name	Status	Notes	Distribution
River otter	Lontra canadensis	Rare	L. canadensis canadensis	Northern
Least weasel	Mustela nivalis	Uncommon	M. nivalis allegheniensis	Western two-thirds
American ermine	Mustela richardsonii	Uncommon		Statewide except southwest
Long-tailed weasel	Neogale frenata	Common		Statewide
Mink	Neogale vison	Common	N. vison mink	Statewide
Fisher	Pekania pennanti	Reintroduced		North central
Badger	Taxidea taxus	Rare	only four confirmed records since 1946	Southwest Pennsylvania

Family: Procyonidae

One species of raccoon occurs in Pennsylvania.

Common name	Scientific name	Status	Notes	Distribution
Raccoon	Procyon lotor	Common	Eastern raccoon, P. lotor lotor	Statewide

== Hoofed mammals ==
Order: Artiodactyla

Family: Cervidae

Two species of deer occur in Pennsylvania.

Common name	Scientific name	Status	Notes	Distribution
Elk	Cervus canadensis	Reintroduced	Eastern elk once inhabited the state, but were driven to extinction. Rocky Mountain elk were introduced in their place in the early 20th century, and the population has risen steadily since then.	North central
White-tailed deer	Odocoileus virginianus	Common	Northern white-tailed deer, O. virginianus borealis	Statewide
