= Pennsylvania =

U.S. state

- State
- Commonwealth of Pennsylvania
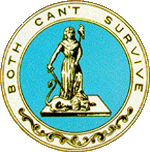
- Flag Seal
- Nicknames: Keystone State; Quaker State
- Motto(s): Virtue, Liberty, and Independence
- Anthem: "Pennsylvania"
- Location of Pennsylvania within the United States
- Country: United States
- Before statehood: Province of Pennsylvania
- Admitted to the Union: December 12, 1787 (2nd)
- Capital: Harrisburg
- Largest city: Philadelphia
- Largest county or equivalent: Philadelphia
- Largest metro and urban areas: Philadelphia

Government
  - Governor: Josh Shapiro (D)
  - Lieutenant Governor: Austin Davis (D)
- Legislature: General Assembly
  - Upper house: State Senate
  - Lower house: House of Representatives
- Judiciary: Supreme Court of Pennsylvania
- U.S. senators: John Fetterman (D); Dave McCormick (R)
- U.S. House delegation: 10 Republicans; 7 Democrats (list)

Area
  - Total: 46,055 sq mi (119,283 km^{2})
  - Land: 44,743 sq mi (115,883 km^{2})
  - Water: 1,300 sq mi (3,400 km^{2}) 2.7%
  - Rank: 33rd

Dimensions
  - Length: 283 mi (455 km)
  - Width: 170 mi (270 km)
- Elevation: 1,120 ft (340 m)
- Highest elevation (Mount Davis (Note: Elevation adjusted to North American Vertical Datum of 1988)): 3,212 ft (979 m)
- Lowest elevation (Delaware River at Delaware border): 0 ft (0 m)

Population (2025)
  - Total: ▲13,059,432
  - Rank: 5th
  - Density: 292/sq mi (112.7/km^{2})
  - Rank: 9th
  - Median household income: $73,800 (2023)
  - Income rank: 28th
- Demonyms: Pennsylvanian; Pennamite; Pennsylvanier (Pennsylvania Dutch)

Language
  - Official language: None
  - Spoken language: English 90.15%; Spanish 4.09%; German (including Pennsylvania Dutch) 0.87%; Chinese 0.47%; Italian 0.43%
- Time zone: UTC– 05:00 (Eastern)
  - Summer (DST): UTC– 04:00 (EDT)
- USPS abbreviation: PA
- ISO 3166 code: US-PA
- Traditional abbreviation: Pa., Penn., Penna.
- Latitude: 39°43′ to 42°16′ N
- Longitude: 74°41′ to 80°31′ W
- Website: pa.gov

State symbols of Pennsylvania
List of state symbols
- Flag of Pennsylvania

- Seal of Pennsylvania

- Emblem of Pennsylvania

- Coat of arms of Pennsylvania

Living insignia
- Amphibian: Eastern Hellbender
- Bird: Ruffed grouse
- Dog breed: Great Dane
- Fish: Brook trout
- Flower: Mountain laurel
- Insect: Firefly (Colloquially "Lightning Bug") (Photuris pensylvanica)
- Mammal: White-tailed deer
- Tree: Eastern hemlock

Inanimate insignia
- Beverage: Milk
- Dance: Polka
- Food: None
- Fossil: Trilobite
- Soil: Hazleton

State route marker

State quarter
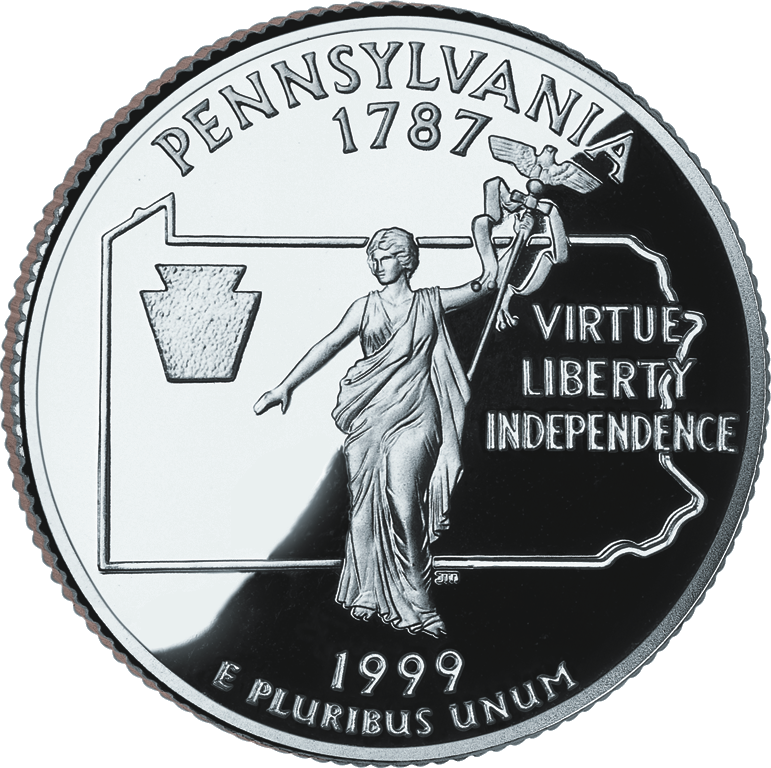
- Released in 1999

Pennsylvania, (Note: /ˌpɛnsɪlˈveɪniə/ PEN-sil-VAY-nee-ə, PEN-sil-VAYN-yə, lit. 'Penn's forest country'; Pennsylvania Dutch: Pennsilfaani) officially the Commonwealth of Pennsylvania, (Note: Pennsylvania is one of only four U.S. states to use the term "Commonwealth" in its official name, along with Massachusetts, Virginia, and Kentucky.) is a state located in the Mid-Atlantic, Northeastern, Appalachian, and Great Lakes regions of the United States. The state borders Delaware to its southeast, Maryland to its south, forming the Mason–Dixon line, West Virginia to its southwest, Ohio to its west, the Canadian province of Ontario to its northwest via Lake Erie, New York to its north, and the Delaware River and New Jersey to its east. Pennsylvania is the fifth-most populous U.S. state, home to over 13 million residents as of the 2020 United States census, and the ninth-highest state by population density. It is the 33rd-largest state by land area. The largest metropolitan statistical area is the Philadelphia metropolitan area/Delaware Valley, centered on Philadelphia, the state's most populous city and sixth-most populous U.S. city, and an expanding biopharmaceutical, commercial, educational, entrepreneurial/venture capital, industrial, and transportational hub. Pennsylvania's second-largest metropolitan area, Greater Pittsburgh, is centered in and around Pittsburgh, also a biopharmaceutical hub and the Commonwealth's second-largest city. Geographically situated between the two larger metros lies Harrisburg, the capital city of Pennsylvania.

Pennsylvania's geography is highly diverse. The Appalachian Mountains run through the center of the state, the Allegheny and Pocono mountains span much of Northeastern Pennsylvania, and approximately 59% of the state is forested. Although Pennsylvania technically has no oceanic shoreline, it has 140 miles (225 km) of waterfront along Lake Erie and along the tidal Delaware River, the latter of which reaches the Delaware Bay, a marginal bay of the Atlantic Ocean.

Pennsylvania was founded in 1681 through a royal land grant to William Penn, the son of the commonwealth's namesake. Before that, between 1638 and 1655, a southeast portion of the state was part of New Sweden, a Swedish colony. Established as a haven for religious and political tolerance, the British colonial-era Province of Pennsylvania was known for its relatively peaceful relations with native tribes, innovative government system, and religious pluralism. Pennsylvania played a vital historical role in the American Revolution and the ultimately successful quest for independence from the British Empire, hosting the First and Second Continental Congress in Philadelphia, the latter of which formed the Continental Army commanded by George Washington in 1775, during the American Revolutionary War, unanimously adopted the Declaration of Independence the following year. On December 12, 1787, Pennsylvania was the second state to ratify the U.S. Constitution after Delaware.

In the 21st century, Pennsylvania has garnered the nickname "Cellicon State" for the central role of Philadelphia and Pittsburgh in the development of technology and immunotherapies to treat different cancers. Artificial intelligence and STEM education are recognized to hold high-priority status for Pennsylvania's long-term mission and future.

== History ==
=== Indigenous settlement ===
Pennsylvania's history of human habitation extends thousands of years before the foundation of the colonial Province of Pennsylvania in 1681. Archaeologists believe the first settlement of the Americas occurred at least 15,000 years ago, during the Last Glacial Period, though it is unclear when humans first inhabited present-day Pennsylvania. Between 10,000 and 16,000 years ago, Native Americans crossed the two continents, arriving in North America. Meadowcroft Rockshelter in Jefferson Township includes the earliest known signs of human activity in Pennsylvania and perhaps all of North America, including the remains of a civilization that existed over 10,000 years ago and possibly pre-dated the Clovis culture. By 1000 AD, in contrast to their nomadic hunter-gatherer ancestors, the native population of Pennsylvania had developed agricultural techniques and a mixed food economy.

By the time European colonization of the Americas began, at least two major Native American tribes inhabited Pennsylvania. The first, the Lenape, spoke an Algonquian language and inhabited the eastern region of the state, then known as Lenapehoking. It included most of present-day New Jersey and the Lehigh Valley and Delaware Valley regions in eastern and southeastern Pennsylvania. The Lenape's territory ended somewhere between the Delaware River in the east and the Susquehanna River in central Pennsylvania. The second tribe, the Susquehannock, spoke an Iroquoian language and were based in Eastern Pennsylvania along the Susquehanna River. European disease and constant warfare with several neighboring tribes and groups of Europeans weakened these two tribes, and they were grossly outpaced financially as the Wendat and Haudenosaunee blocked them from proceeding west into Ohio during the Beaver Wars. As they lost numbers and land, the Wendat abandoned much of their western territory and moved closer to the Susquehanna River, and the Haudenosaunee and Mohawk tribes moved further north. The Iroquoian Petun was northwest of the Allegheny River.

=== 17th century ===
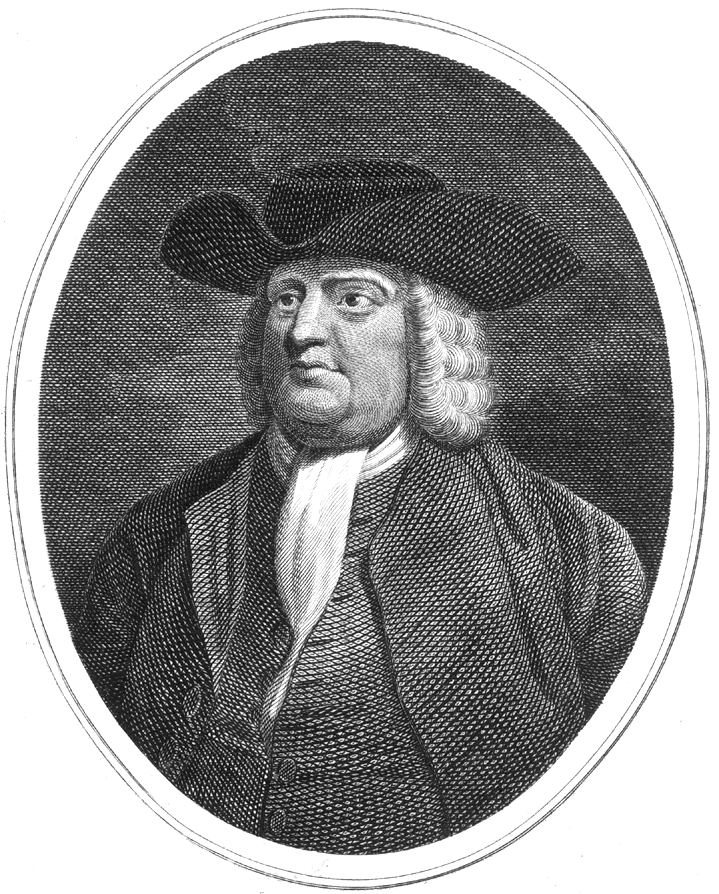
William Penn, a Quaker and son of a prominent admiral, founded the colonial Province of Pennsylvania in 1681.

In the 17th century, the Dutch and the English claimed both sides of the Delaware River as part of their colonial lands in America. The Dutch were the first to take possession. By June 3, 1631, the Dutch began settling the Delmarva Peninsula by establishing the Zwaanendael Colony on the site of present-day Lewes, Delaware. In 1638, Sweden established the New Sweden Colony in the region of Fort Christina on the site of present-day Wilmington, Delaware. New Sweden claimed and, for the most part, controlled the lower Delaware River region, including parts of present-day Delaware, New Jersey, and Pennsylvania, but settled few colonists there.

On March 12, 1664, King Charles II of England gave James, Duke of York a grant that incorporated all lands included in the original Virginia Company of Plymouth Grant and other lands. This grant was in conflict with the Dutch claim for New Netherland, which included parts of today's Pennsylvania.

On June 24, 1664, the Duke of York sold the portion of his large grant that included present-day New Jersey to John Berkeley and George Carteret for a proprietary colony. The land was not yet in British possession, but the sale boxed in the portion of New Netherland on the West side of the Delaware River. The British conquest of New Netherland began on August 29, 1664, when New Amsterdam was coerced to surrender while facing cannons on British ships in New York Harbor. The conquest was completed in October 1664, when the British captured Fort Casimir in what today is New Castle, Delaware. The Treaty of Breda between England, France, and the Netherlands confirmed the English conquest on July 21, 1667, although there were temporary reversions.

On September 12, 1672, during the Third Anglo-Dutch War, the Dutch reconquered New York Colony/New Amsterdam, establishing three County Courts, which went on to become original Counties in present-day Delaware and Pennsylvania. The one that later transferred to Pennsylvania was Upland. This was partially reversed on February 9, 1674, when the Treaty of Westminster ended the Third Anglo-Dutch War and reverted all political situations to the status quo ante bellum. The British retained the Dutch Counties with their Dutch names. By June 11, 1674, New York reasserted control over the outlying colonies, including Upland, and the names started to be changed to British names by November 11, 1674. Upland was partitioned on November 12, 1674, producing the general outline of the current border between Pennsylvania and Delaware.

On February 28, 1681, Charles II granted a land charter to Quaker leader William Penn to repay a debt of £16,000 (around £2,100,000 in 2008, adjusting for retail inflation) owed to William's father. The transaction represents one of the largest land grants to an individual in history. Penn proposed that the land be called New Wales, but there were objections to that name, so he recommended Sylvania (from the Latin silva: "forest, woods"). The King named it Pennsylvania (literally "Penn's Woods") in honor of Admiral Penn. The younger Penn was embarrassed at this name, fearing that people would think he had named it after himself, but King Charles would not rename the grant. Penn established a government with two innovations, the county commission and freedom of religion, which were subsequently replicated in many of the Thirteen Colonies.

What had been Upland on the Pennsylvania side of the Pennsylvania-Delaware border was renamed Chester County when Pennsylvania instituted its colonial governments on March 4, 1681. Penn signed a peace treaty with Tamanend, leader of the Lenape, which began a long period of friendly relations between the Quakers and the Indians. Additional treaties between Quakers and other tribes followed. The Treaty of Shackamaxon of William Penn was never violated.

=== 18th century ===
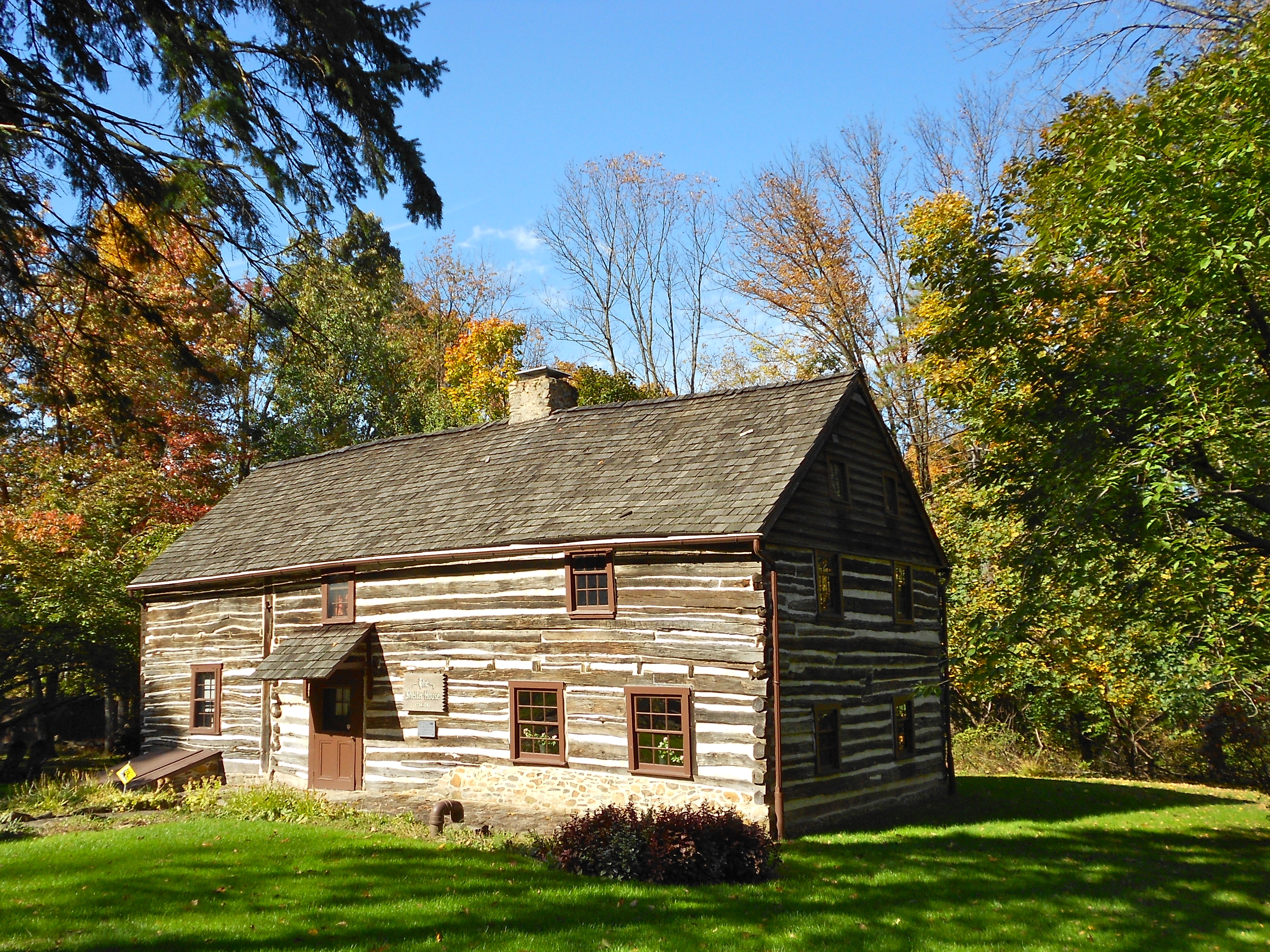
Shelter House in Emmaus, constructed in 1734 by Pennsylvania German settlers, is the oldest continuously occupied building structure in the Lehigh Valley and one of the oldest in Pennsylvania

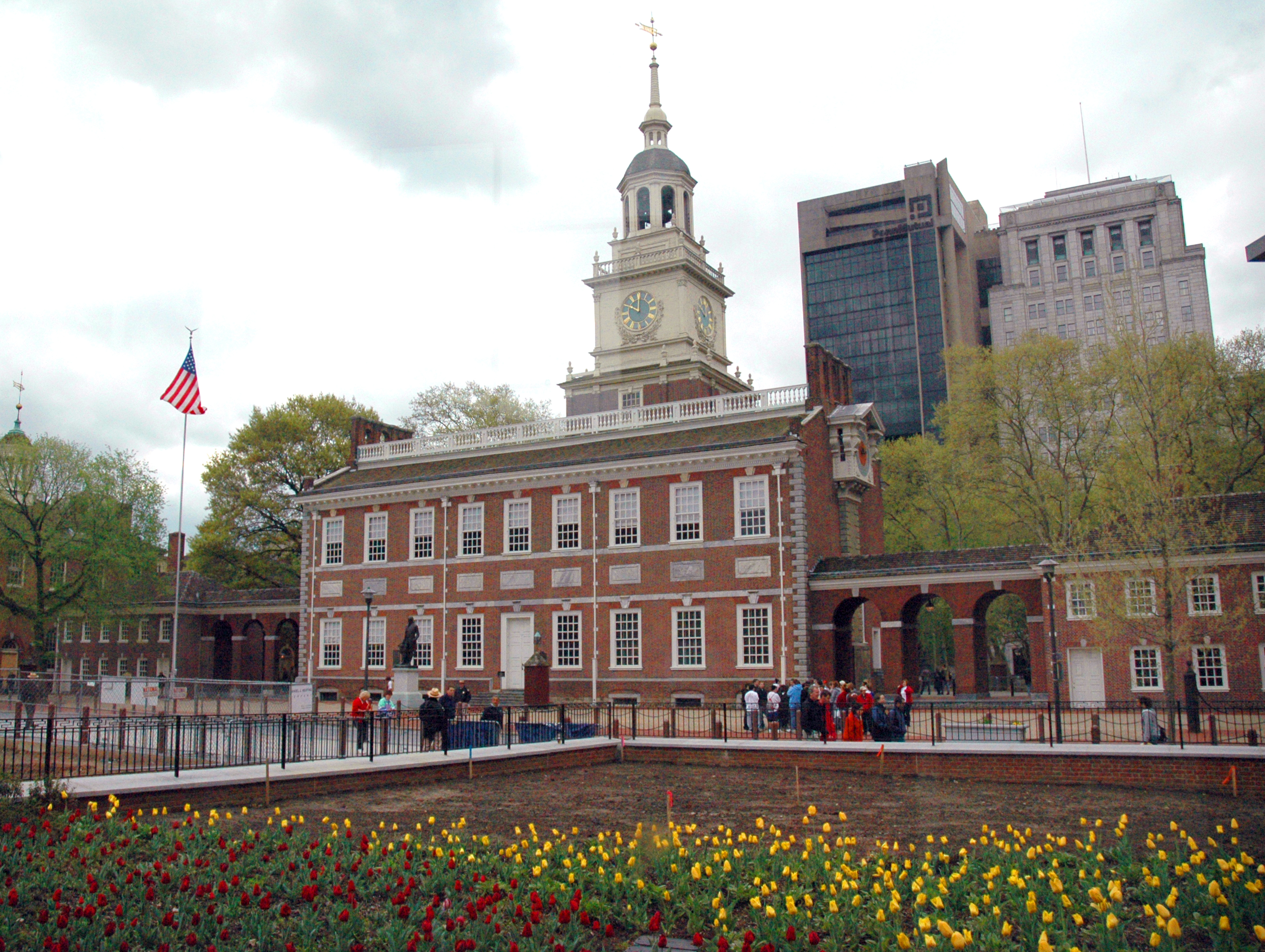
Independence Hall in Philadelphia, where the Declaration of Independence and United States Constitution were adopted in 1776 and 1787–88, respectively

Between 1730 and when the Pennsylvania Colony was shut down by Parliament with the Currency Act in 1764, the Pennsylvania Colony made its own paper money to account for the shortage of actual gold and silver. The paper money was called Colonial Scrip.

The Colony issued bills of credit, which were as good as gold or silver coins because of their legal tender status. Since they were issued by the government and not a banking institution, they were interest-free, largely defraying the expense of the government and therefore taxation of the people. It also promoted general employment and prosperity, since the government used discretion and did not issue excessive amounts that inflated the currency. Benjamin Franklin had a hand in creating this currency, whose utility, he said, was never to be disputed. The currency also met with "cautious approval" by Adam Smith.

In 1740, Franklin also founded the University of Pennsylvania in Philadelphia. The university, one of nine colonial colleges, was the first college established in Pennsylvania and one of the first in the nation. Today, it is an Ivy League university, which is routinely ranked among the world's best universities. Dickinson College in Carlisle, founded by Benjamin Rush and named after John Dickinson, was the first college founded after Revolutionary War and the unification of the states. Established in 1773, it was ratified on September 9, 1783, five days after the Treaty of Paris.

James Smith wrote that in 1763, "the Indians again commenced hostilities, and were busily engaged in killing and scalping the frontier inhabitants in various parts of Pennsylvania. This state was then a Quaker government, and at the first of this war the frontiers received no assistance from the state." The ensuing hostilities became known as Pontiac's War.

After the Stamp Act Congress of 1765, delegate John Dickinson of Philadelphia wrote the Declaration of Rights and Grievances. The Congress was the first meeting of the Thirteen Colonies, which convened at the request of the Massachusetts assembly; nine of the 13 colonies sent delegates. Dickinson then wrote Letters from a Farmer in Pennsylvania, To the Inhabitants of the British Colonies, which were published in the Pennsylvania Chronicle between December 2, 1767, and February 15, 1768.

When the Founding Fathers convened in Philadelphia in 1774, 12 colonies sent representatives to the First Continental Congress. The Second Continental Congress, which began in May 1775, authored and signed the Declaration of Independence in Philadelphia, but when Philadelphia fell to the British in the Philadelphia campaign, the Continental Congress moved west, where it met at the Lancaster courthouse on Saturday, September 27, 1777, and then to York. In York, the Second Continental Congress adopted the Articles of Confederation, largely authored by Pennsylvania delegate John Dickinson, that formed 13 independent States (Note: At the time, Vermont had not yet seceded from New York State.) into a new union. Later, the Constitution was written, and Philadelphia was once again chosen to be cradle to the new nation. The Constitution was drafted and signed at the Pennsylvania State House in Philadelphia, now known as Independence Hall, the same building where the Declaration of Independence was previously adopted and signed in 1776.

On December 12, 1787, Pennsylvania was the second state to ratify the U.S. Constitution, five days after Delaware became the first. At the time, Pennsylvania was the most ethnically and religiously diverse of the thirteen colonies. Because a third of Pennsylvania's population spoke German, the Constitution was presented in German so that German speakers could participate in the discussion about it. Reverend Frederick Muhlenberg, a Lutheran minister and the first Speaker of the U.S. House of Representatives, acted as chairman of Pennsylvania's ratifying convention.

For about half a century, the Pennsylvania General Assembly met in the Philadelphia area before it began meeting regularly in Independence Hall in Philadelphia for 63 years. However, events such as the Paxton Boys massacres of 1763 had made the legislature aware of the need for a central capital. In 1799, the General Assembly moved to the Lancaster Courthouse.

=== 19th century ===
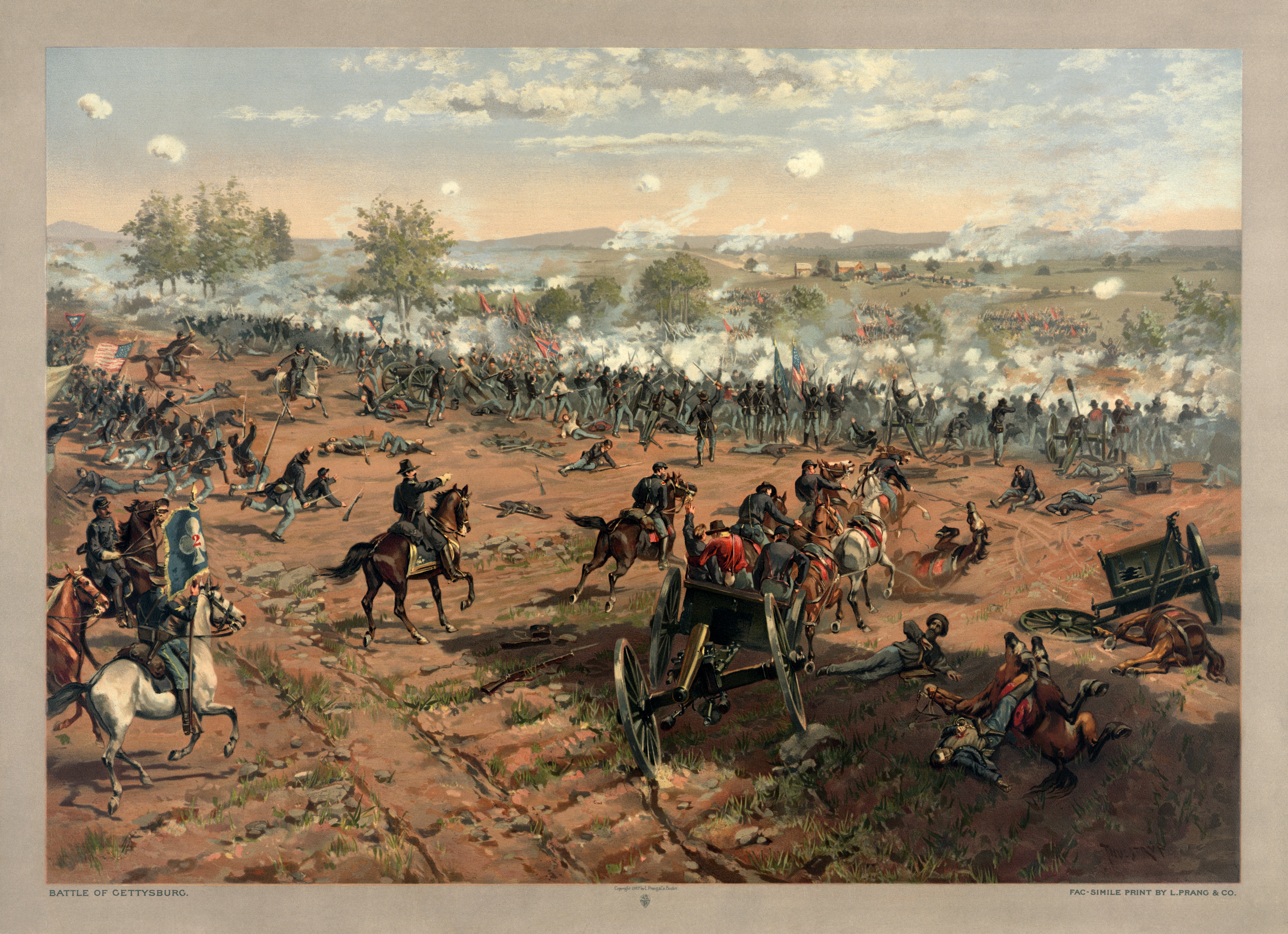
The Battle of Gettysburg, an 1887 portrait by Thure de Thulstrup depicting the Battle of Gettysburg, fought over three days from July 1 to 3, 1863, in Gettysburg. It was the deadliest battle ever fought on American soil and the bloodiest battle in all of American military history. But the Union army's victory at Gettysburg proved the Civil War's turning point, paving the way for the Union's ultimate victory two years later and the nation's preservation.

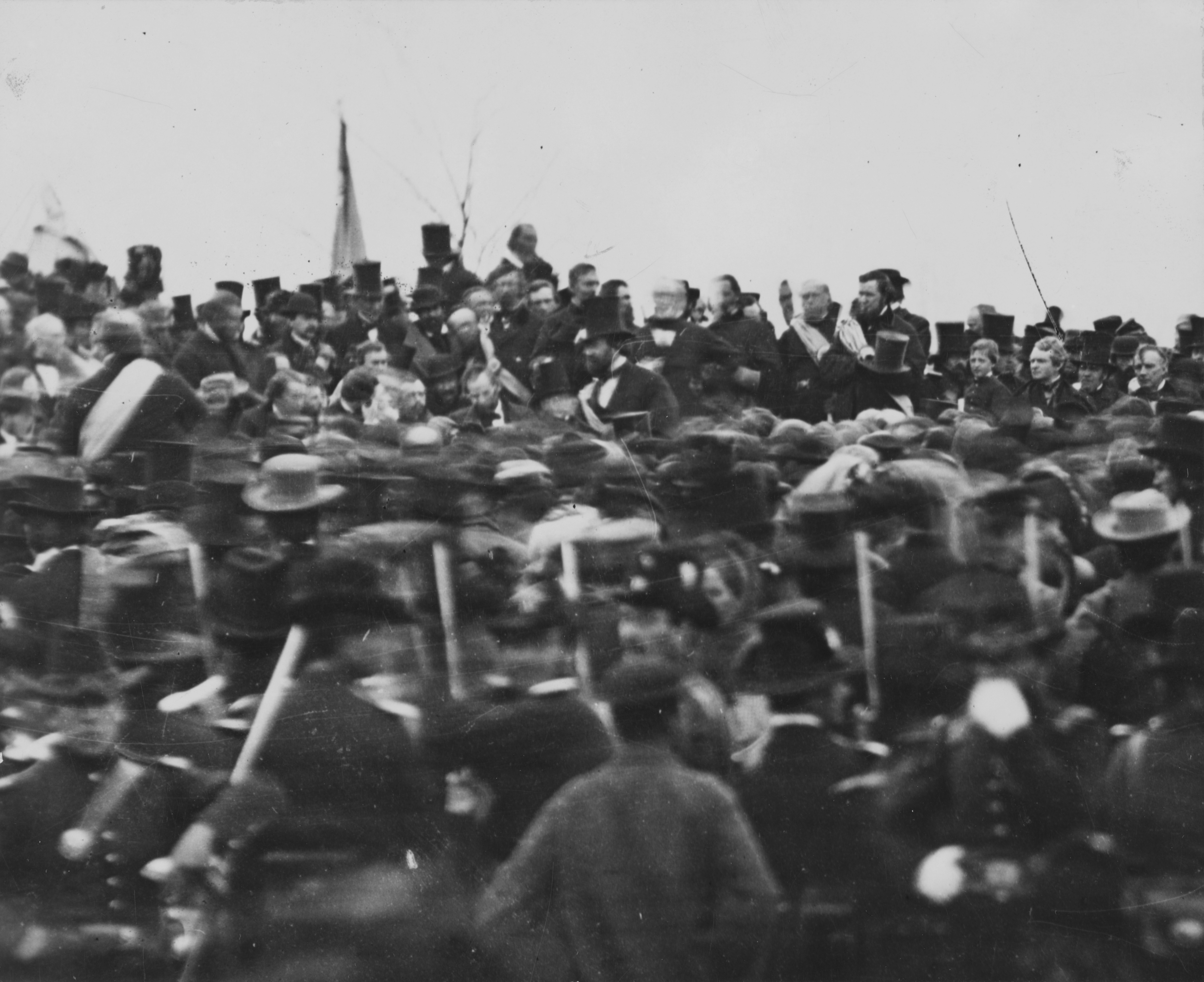
On November 19, 1863, President Abraham Lincoln (center, facing camera) traveled to present-day Gettysburg National Cemetery and delivered the Gettysburg Address, a 271-word address considered one of the most famous speeches in American history.

The Pennsylvania General Assembly met in the old Dauphin County Court House until December 1821 when the Federal-style Hills Capitol, named for Lancaster architect Stephen Hills, was constructed on a hilltop land grant of four acres set aside for a seat of state government in Harrisburg by the son and namesake of John Harris, Sr., a Yorkshire native who founded a trading post and ferry on the east shore of the Susquehanna River in 1705. The Hills Capitol burned down on February 2, 1897, during a heavy snowstorm, presumably because of a faulty flue.

While awaiting the construction of a new capitol, the General Assembly temporarily convened at a nearby Methodist Church. Following an architectural selection contest, Chicago-based architect Henry Ives Cobb was commissioned to design and build the replacement structure, a project hindered by strict financial limitations imposed by its legislature. When they dubbed the roughly finished, somewhat industrial Cobb Capitol building complete, the General Assembly refused to occupy the building. In 1901, political and popular indignation prompted a second contest that was restricted to Pennsylvania architects; Joseph Miller Huston of Philadelphia was chosen to design the present Pennsylvania State Capitol that incorporated Cobb's building into a magnificent public work, finished and dedicated in 1906.

From 1857 to 1861, James Buchanan, a Franklin County native, served as the 15th U.S. president, the first president to be born in Pennsylvania.

Over three days, from July 1 to 3, 1863, during the American Civil War, the Battle of Gettysburg was fought near Gettysburg. The Battle of Gettysburg was the bloodiest battle of both the Civil War and of any battle in American history. The Union army's victory at Gettysburg also proved the Civil War's turning point, leading to the Union's victory two years later and the nation's preservation. Several months later, on November 19, 1863, then U.S. president Abraham Lincoln traveled to Gettysburg, where he participated in a ceremonial consecration of present-day Gettysburg National Cemetery and delivered the Gettysburg Address, a 271-word speech that is one of the most famous speeches in American history. During the Civil War, an estimated 350,000 Pennsylvanians served in the Union army, including 8,600 African American military volunteers.

The politics of Pennsylvania were for decades dominated by the financially conservative Republican-aligned Cameron machine, established by U.S. Senator Simon Cameron, who later served as Lincoln's Secretary of War. Control of the machine was subsequently passed on to Cameron's son J. Donald Cameron, whose ineffectiveness resulted in a transfer of power to Matthew Quay and later to Boies Penrose.

The post-Civil War era, known as the Gilded Age, saw the continued rise of industry in Pennsylvania. Pennsylvania was home to some of the largest steel companies in the world. Andrew Carnegie founded the Carnegie Steel Company in Pittsburgh and Charles M. Schwab founded Bethlehem Steel in Bethlehem. Other titans of industry, including John D. Rockefeller and Jay Gould, also operated in Pennsylvania. In the latter half of the 19th century, the U.S. oil industry was born in Western Pennsylvania, which supplied the vast majority of kerosene for years thereafter. As the Pennsylvania oil rush developed, Pennsylvania's oil boom towns, such as Titusville, rose and later fell. Coal mining, primarily in the state's Coal Region in the northeast region of the state, also was a major industry for much of the 19th and 20th centuries. In 1903, Milton S. Hershey began construction on a chocolate factory in Hershey, Pennsylvania; The Hershey Company grew to become the largest chocolate manufacturer in North America. Heinz Company was also founded during this period. These huge companies exercised a large influence on the politics of Pennsylvania; as Henry Demarest Lloyd put it, oil baron John D. Rockefeller "had done everything with the Pennsylvania legislature except refine it". Pennsylvania created a Department of Highways and engaged in a vast program of road-building, while railroads continued to see heavy usage.

The growth of industry eventually provided middle class incomes to working-class households after the development of labor unions helped them gain living wages. However, the rise of unions also led to a rise of union busting with several private police forces springing up. Pennsylvania was the location of the first documented organized strike in North America, and Pennsylvania was the location of two hugely prominent strikes, the Great Railroad Strike of 1877 and the Coal Strike of 1902. The eight-hour day was eventually adopted, and the coal and iron police were banned.

=== 20th century ===
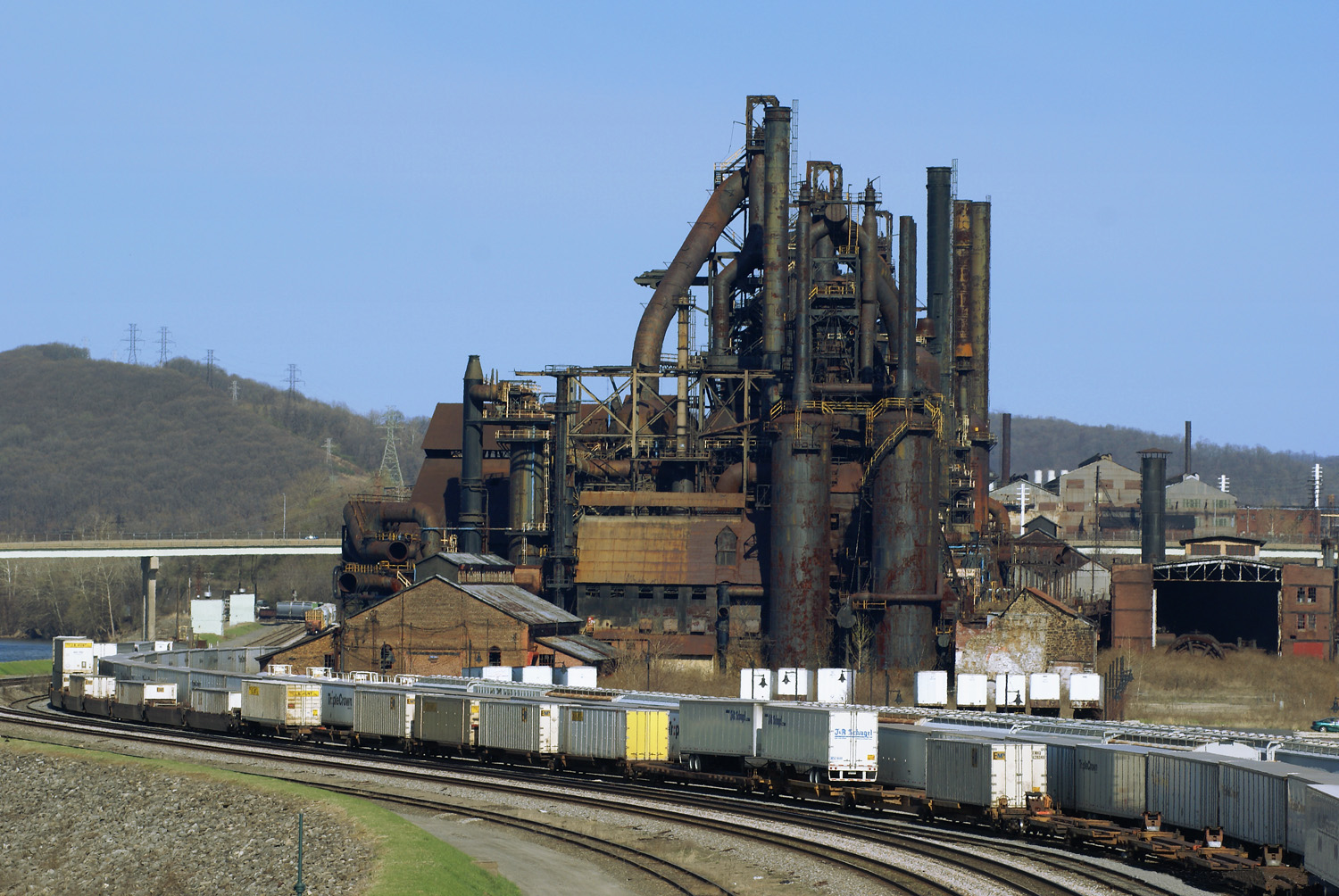
Bethlehem Steel in Bethlehem was one of the world's leading steel manufacturers for most of the 20th century. In 1982, however, it discontinued most of its operations, declared bankruptcy in 2001, and was dissolved in 2003.

In the beginning of the 20th century, Pennsylvania's economy was centered on steel manufacturing, logging, coal mining, textile production, and other forms of industrial manufacturing. A surge in immigration to the U.S. during the late 19th and early 20th centuries provided a steady flow of cheap labor for these industries, which often employed children and people who could not speak English from Southern and Eastern Europe. Thousands of Pennsylvanians volunteered during the Spanish–American War. Pennsylvania was an important industrial center during World War I. The state provided over 300,000 soldiers during the war. On May 31, 1918, the Pittsburgh Agreement was signed in Pittsburgh, signed by Tomáš Masaryk and established Czechoslovakia as an independent nation.

In 1922, 310,000 Pennsylvania miners joined the UMW General coal strike, which lasted 163 days and shut down most of the state's coal mines.

In 1923, President Calvin Coolidge established the Allegheny National Forest under the authority of the Weeks Act of 1911. The forest is located in the northwest part of the state in Elk, Forest, McKean, and Warren Counties for the purposes of timber production and watershed protection in the Allegheny River basin. The Allegheny is the state's only national forest.

In 1922, the Benjamin Franklin Bridge began being constructed for the Sesquicentennial Exposition in Philadelphia being held in 1926. The chief engineer of the bridge was Polish-born Ralph Modjeski, the design engineer was Leon Moisseiff, the supervising architect was Paul Philippe Cret, and the construction engineer was Montgomery B. Case. Work began on January 6, 1922. At the peak of construction, 1,300 people worked on the bridge, and 15 died during its construction. The bridge was originally painted by a commercial painting company owned by David A. Salkind, of Philadelphia, which also painted the Golden Gate Bridge. The bridge opened to traffic on July 1, 1926, three days ahead of its scheduled opening on the nation's 150th anniversary. At completion, its 1,750-foot (533-meter) span was the world's longest for a suspension bridge, a distinction it held until the opening of the Ambassador Bridge connecting Detroit, Michigan, with Windsor, Ontario, Canada, in 1929.

During World War II, Pennsylvania manufactured 6.6 percent of total U.S. military armaments for the war, the sixth-most of the 48 states. Philadelphia Naval Shipyard served as an important naval base during the war, and Pennsylvania produced many of the war's most important military leaders, including George C. Marshall, Hap Arnold, Jacob Devers, and Carl Spaatz. During World War II, over a million Pennsylvanians served in the armed forces, and more Medals of Honor were awarded to Pennsylvanians than to individuals from any other state.

On March 28, 1979, the Three Mile Island accident was the most significant nuclear accident in U.S. commercial nuclear power plant history. The state was hard-hit by the decline and restructuring of the steel industry and other heavy industries during the late 20th century. With job losses came heavy population losses, especially in the state's largest cities. Pittsburgh lost its place among the top ten most populous cities in the United States in 1950, and Philadelphia dropped to the fifth and is currently the sixth-largest city after decades of ranking among the top three.

After 1990, as information-based industries became more important in the economy, state and local governments put more resources into the old, well-established public library system. Some localities, however, used new state funding to cut local taxes. New ethnic groups, especially Hispanics and Latinos, began entering the state to fill low-skill jobs in agriculture and service industries. For example, in Chester County, Mexican immigrants brought the Spanish language, increased Catholicism, high birth rates, and cuisine when they were hired as agricultural laborers; in some rural localities, they made up half or more of the population.

Stateside Puerto Ricans have built a large community in the state's third-largest city, Allentown, where they comprise over 40% of the city's population as of 2000.

In the late 20th century, as Pennsylvania's historical national and even global leadership in mining largely ceased and its steelmaking and other heavy manufacturing sectors slowed, the state sought to grow its service and other industries to replace the jobs and economic productivity lost from the downturn of these industries. Pittsburgh's concentration of universities has enabled it to be a leader in technology and healthcare. Similarly, Philadelphia has a concentration of university expertise. Healthcare, retail, transportation, and tourism are some of the state's growing industries of the postindustrial era. As in the rest of the nation, most residential population growth has occurred in suburban rather than central city areas, although both major cities have had significant revitalization in their downtown areas. Philadelphia anchors the seventh-largest metropolitan area in the country and one of the largest metropolitan areas in the world, and Pittsburgh is the center of the nation's 27th-largest metropolitan areas. As of 2020, the Lehigh Valley in eastern Pennsylvania is the nation's 69th-largest metropolitan area. Pennsylvania also has six additional metropolitan areas that rank among the nation's 200-most populous metropolitan areas. Philadelphia forms part of the Northeast megalopolis and is associated with the Northeastern United States. Pittsburgh is part of the Great Lakes megalopolis and is often associated with the Rust Belt.

=== 21st century ===
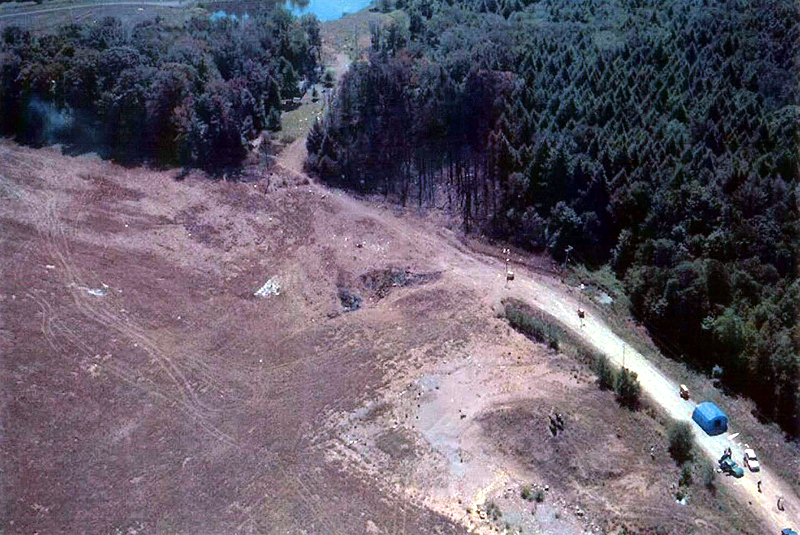
The Stonycreek Township crash site of Flight 93, one of four planes hijacked in the September 11 attacks; the site is now a national memorial. Flight 93 passengers wrestled with al-Qaeda terrorist hijackers for control of the plane, preventing it from being likely flown into the U.S. Capitol or the White House.

During the September 11, 2001, terrorist attacks on the United States, the small town of Shanksville, Pennsylvania, received worldwide attention after United Airlines Flight 93 crashed into a field in Stonycreek Township, located 1.75 miles (2.82 km) north of the town. All 40 civilians and 4 Al-Qaeda hijackers on board were killed. The hijackers had intended to fly the plane to Washington, D.C. to crash it likely into either the United States Capitol or The White House. After learning from family members via air phone of the earlier attacks on the World Trade Center in New York City and the Pentagon in Arlington County, Virginia, however, Flight 93's passengers revolted against the hijackers and fought for control of the plane, causing it to crash. It was the only one of the four aircraft hijacked that day that never reached its intended target and the heroism of the passengers has been commemorated.

In October 2018, the Tree of Life – Or L'Simcha Congregation, a conservative Jewish synagogue, experienced the Pittsburgh synagogue shooting, which resulted in 11 fatalities. On July 13, 2024, near Butler, Pennsylvania, an assassination attempt on the 45th President of the United States Donald Trump occurred. Since the inception of the 21st century, Pennsylvania has garnered the additional nickname of "Cellicon State" for the central role of Philadelphia and Pittsburgh in the development of immunotherapies to treat different cancers.

== Geography ==
Pennsylvania is 170 miles (274 km) north to south and 283 miles (455 km) east to west. Of a total 46,055 square miles (119,282 km^{2}), 44,817 square miles (116,075 km^{2}) are land, 490 square miles (1,269 km^{2}) are inland waters, and 749 square miles (1,940 km^{2}) are waters in Lake Erie. It is the 33rd-largest state in the United States. Pennsylvania has 51 miles (82 km) of coastline along Lake Erie and 57 miles (92 km) of shoreline along the Delaware Estuary. Of the original Thirteen Colonies, Pennsylvania is the only state that does not border the Atlantic Ocean. With 86,000 miles of rivers and streams, Pennsylvania has the highest density of waterways of any state in the continental United States.

The boundaries of the state are the Mason–Dixon line (39°43' N) to the south, Twelve-Mile Circle on the Pennsylvania-Delaware border, the Delaware River to the east, 80°31' W to the west, and the 42° N to the north, except for a short segment on the western end where a triangle extends north to Lake Erie. The state has five geographical regions: Allegheny Plateau, Ridge and Valley, Atlantic Coastal Plain, Piedmont, and Erie Plain.

=== Climate ===
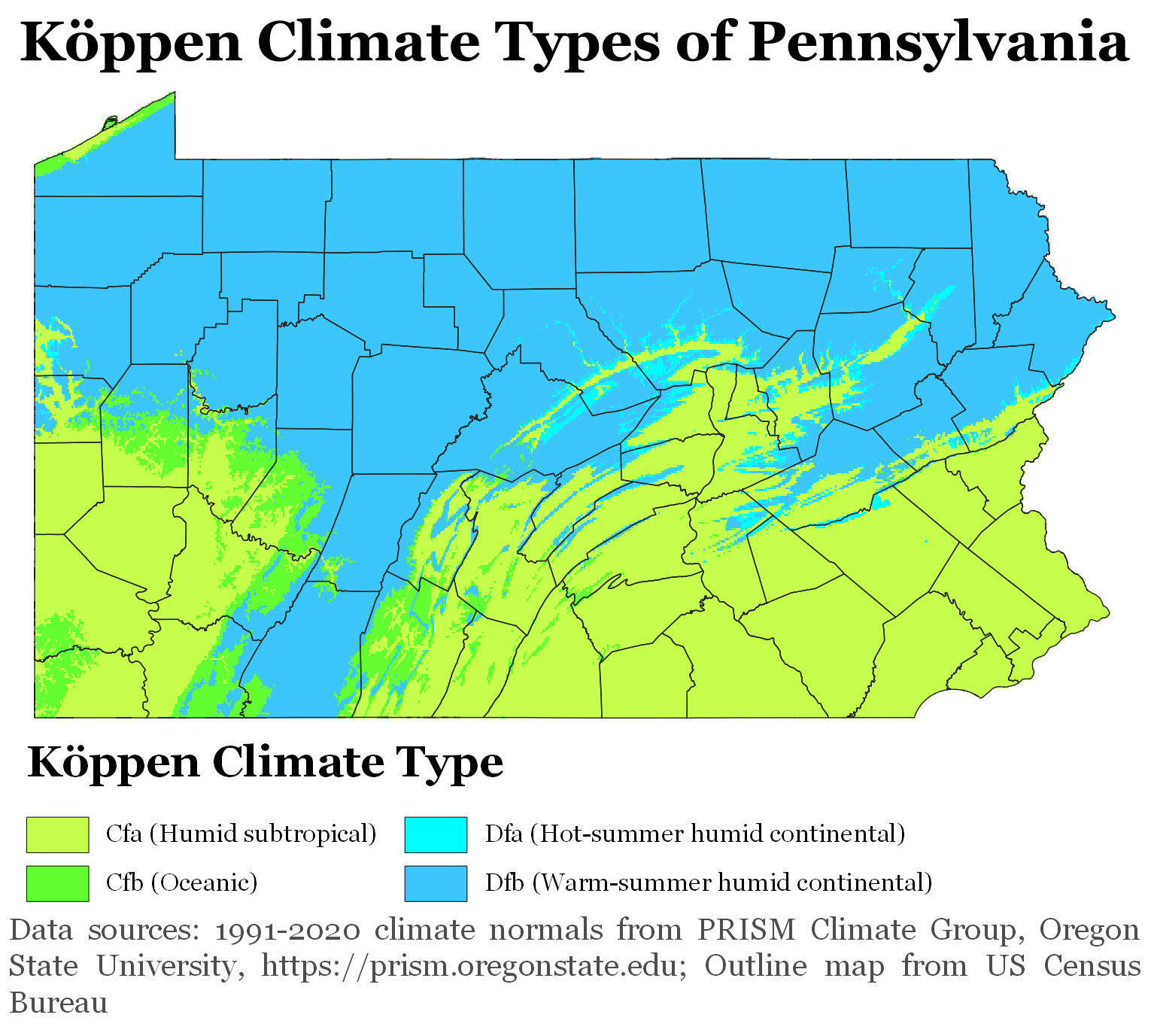
The Köppen climate types of Pennsylvania based on 1991–2020 climate normals

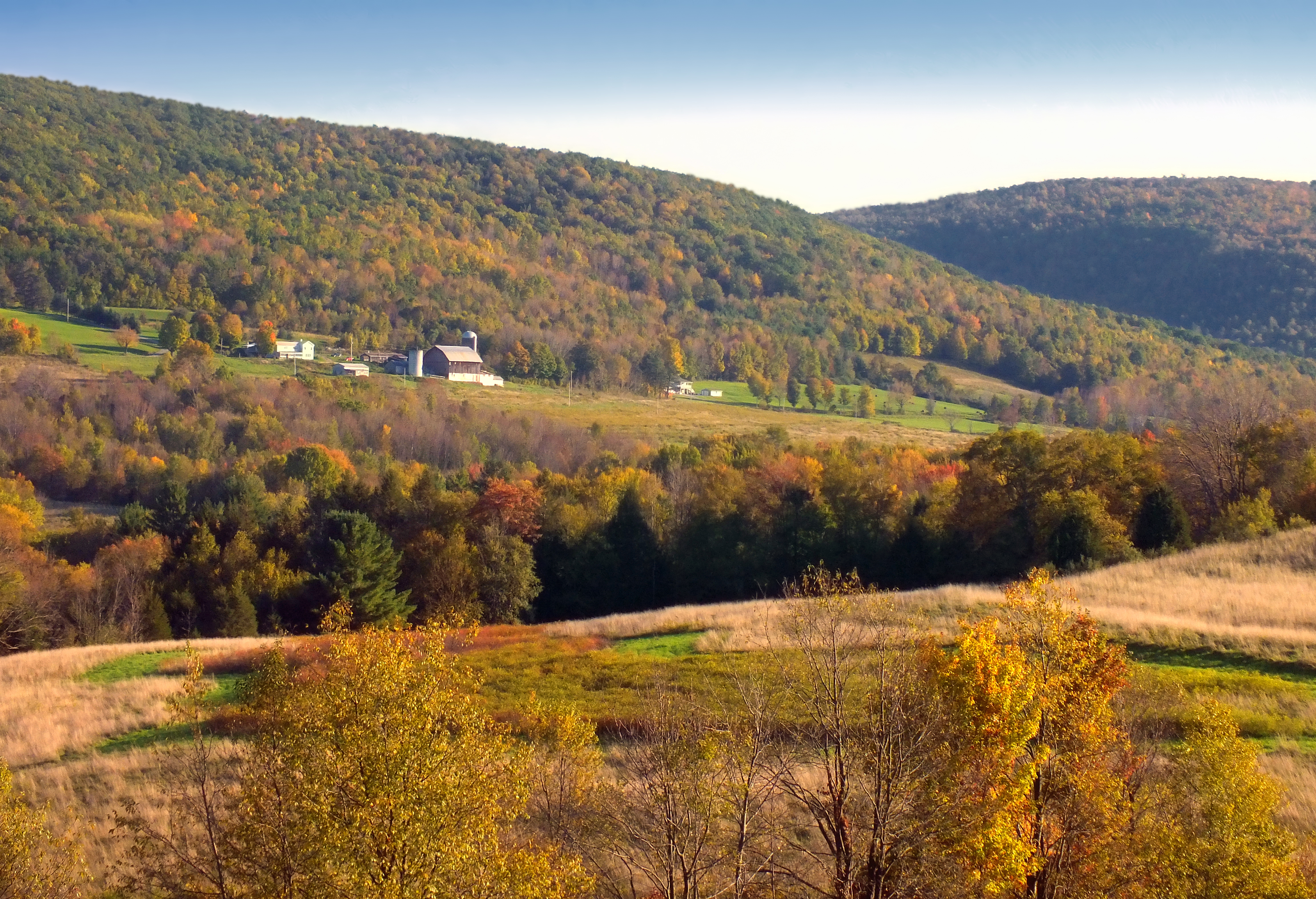
Autumn in North Branch Township in Wyoming County in October 2011

Pennsylvania's diverse topography produces a variety of climates, though the entire state experiences cool to cold winters and very warm, humid summers. Straddling two major zones, much of the state has a humid continental climate (Köppen climate classification Dfa or Dfb). The southern portion of the state has a humid subtropical climate. The largest city, Philadelphia, has a humid subtropical climate (Köppen Cfa).

Summers are generally hot and humid. Moving toward the mountainous interior of the state, the winter climate becomes colder, the number of cloudy days increases, and snowfall amounts are greater. Western areas of the state, particularly locations near Lake Erie, can receive over 100 inches (250 cm) of snowfall annually, and the entire state receives plentiful precipitation throughout the year. The state may be subject to severe weather from spring through summer into autumn. Tornadoes occur annually in the state, sometimes in large numbers, such as 30 recorded tornadoes in 2011; violent tornadoes, however, are rarer than they are in states further west.

Monthly Average High and Low Temperatures For Various Pennsylvania Cities (in °F)
| City | Jan. | Feb. | Mar. | Apr. | May | Jun. | Jul. | Aug. | Sep. | Oct. | Nov. | Dec. |
| Allentown | 36/20 | 40/22 | 49/29 | 61/39 | 72/48 | 80/58 | 84/63 | 82/61 | 75/53 | 64/41 | 52/33 | 40/24 |
| Erie | 34/21 | 36/21 | 44/27 | 56/38 | 67/48 | 76/58 | 80/63 | 79/62 | 72/56 | 61/45 | 50/37 | 38/27 |
| Harrisburg | 37/23 | 41/25 | 50/33 | 62/42 | 72/52 | 81/62 | 85/66 | 83/64 | 76/56 | 64/45 | 53/35 | 41/27 |
| Philadelphia | 40/26 | 44/28 | 53/34 | 64/44 | 74/54 | 83/64 | 87/69 | 85/68 | 78/60 | 67/48 | 56/39 | 45/30 |
| Pittsburgh | 36/21 | 39/23 | 49/30 | 62/40 | 71/49 | 79/58 | 83/63 | 81/62 | 74/54 | 63/43 | 51/35 | 39/25 |
| Scranton | 33/19 | 37/21 | 46/28 | 59/38 | 70/48 | 78/56 | 82/61 | 80/60 | 72/52 | 61/41 | 49/33 | 38/24 |

=== Municipalities ===
Cities in Pennsylvania include Philadelphia, Reading, Lebanon, and Lancaster in the southeast, Pittsburgh in the southwest, and the tri-cities of Allentown, Bethlehem, and Easton in the central east, known as the Lehigh Valley. The northeast includes the former anthracite coal mining cities of Scranton, Wilkes-Barre, Pittston, Nanticoke, and Hazleton. Erie is located in the northwest. State College is located in the central region. Williamsport is in the north-central region with York, Carlisle, and the state capital Harrisburg on the Susquehanna River in the east-central region of the state. Altoona and Johnstown are in the state's west-central region. Many settlements in the southern portion of the state are laid out in the characteristic Pennsylvania Town type.

The state's three-most populated cities, in order of size, are Philadelphia, Pittsburgh, and Allentown.

Largest municipalities in Pennsylvania Source:
| Rank | Name | County | Pop. | Rank | Name | County | Pop. |
|---|---|---|---|---|---|---|---|
| 1 | Philadelphia | Philadelphia | 1,603,797 | 11 | Lancaster | Lancaster | 58,039 |
| 2 | Pittsburgh | Allegheny | 302,971 | 12 | Millcreek Township | Erie | 54,073 |
| 3 | Allentown | Lehigh | 125,845 | 13 | Lower Paxton Township | Dauphin | 53,501 |
| 4 | Reading | Berks | 95,112 | 14 | Haverford Township | Delaware | 50,431 |
| 5 | Erie | Erie | 94,831 | 15 | Harrisburg | Dauphin | 50,099 |
| 6 | Upper Darby Township | Delaware | 85,681 | 16 | York | York | 44,800 |
| 7 | Scranton | Lackawanna | 76,328 | 17 | Wilkes-Barre | Luzerne | 44,328 |
| 8 | Bethlehem | Northampton | 75,781 | 18 | Altoona | Blair | 43,963 |
| 9 | Lower Merion Township | Montgomery | 63,633 | 19 | Hempfield Township | Westmoreland | 41,466 |
| 10 | Bensalem Township | Bucks | 62,707 | 20 | Penn Hills | Allegheny | 41,059 |

=== Adjacent states and province ===
- Ontario (Province of Canada) (Northwest)
- New York (North and Northeast)
- New Jersey (East and Southeast)
- Delaware (Extreme Southeast)
- Maryland (South)
- West Virginia (Southwest)
- Ohio (West)

== Demographics ==
Historical population
| Census | Pop. | Note | %± |
|---|---|---|---|
| 1790 | 434,373 | | — |
| 1800 | 602,365 | | 38.7% |
| 1810 | 810,091 | | 34.5% |
| 1820 | 1,049,458 | | 29.5% |
| 1830 | 1,348,233 | | 28.5% |
| 1840 | 1,724,033 | | 27.9% |
| 1850 | 2,311,786 | | 34.1% |
| 1860 | 2,906,215 | | 25.7% |
| 1870 | 3,521,951 | | 21.2% |
| 1880 | 4,282,891 | | 21.6% |
| 1890 | 5,258,113 | | 22.8% |
| 1900 | 6,302,115 | | 19.9% |
| 1910 | 7,665,111 | | 21.6% |
| 1920 | 8,720,017 | | 13.8% |
| 1930 | 9,631,350 | | 10.5% |
| 1940 | 9,900,180 | | 2.8% |
| 1950 | 10,498,012 | | 6.0% |
| 1960 | 11,319,366 | | 7.8% |
| 1970 | 11,793,909 | | 4.2% |
| 1980 | 11,863,895 | | 0.6% |
| 1990 | 11,881,643 | | 0.1% |
| 2000 | 12,281,054 | | 3.4% |
| 2010 | 12,702,379 | | 3.4% |
| 2020 | 13,002,700 | | 2.4% |
| 2025 (est.) | 13,059,432 | | 0.4% |
Source: 1910–2020

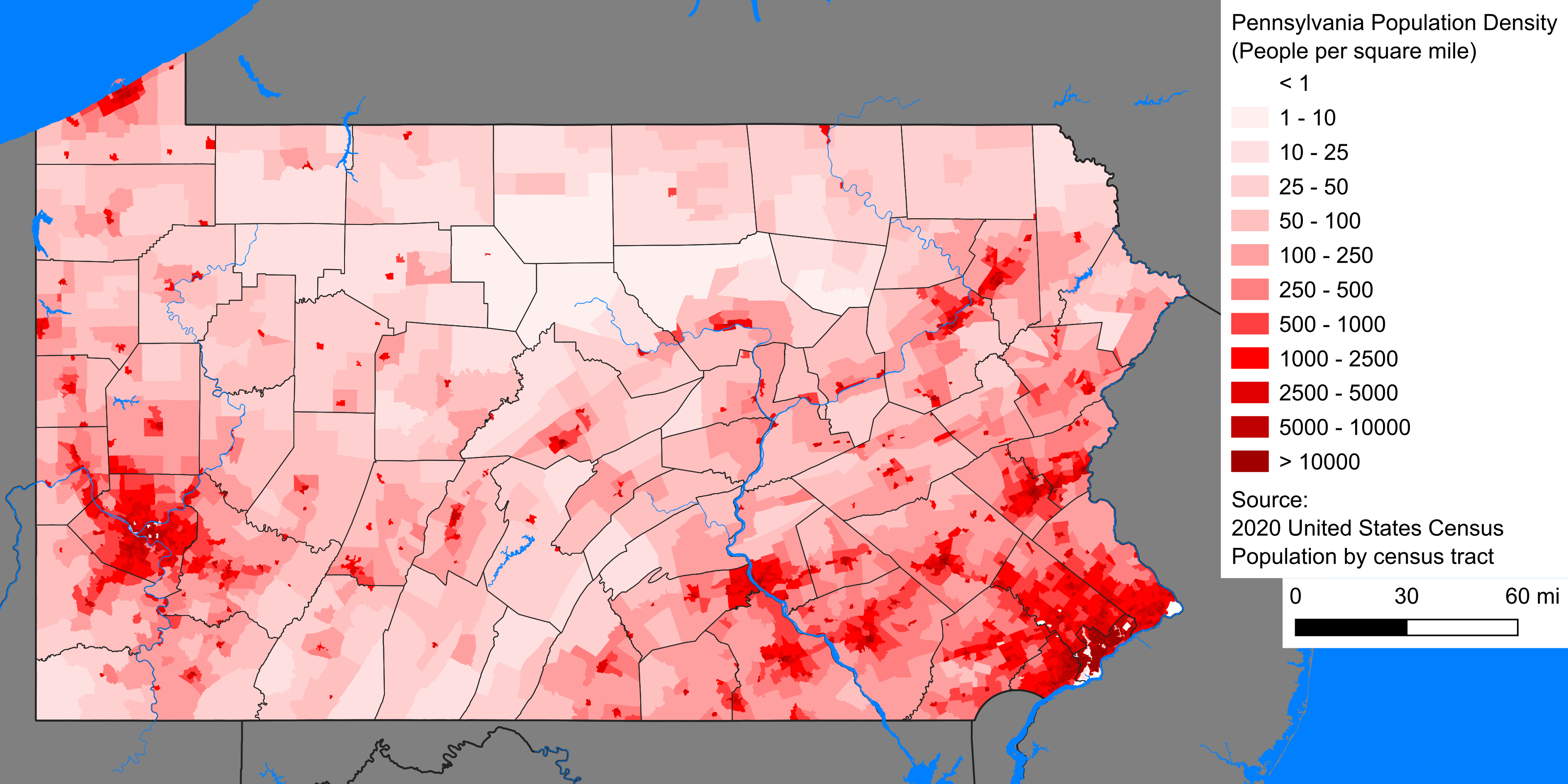
Pennsylvania population density map

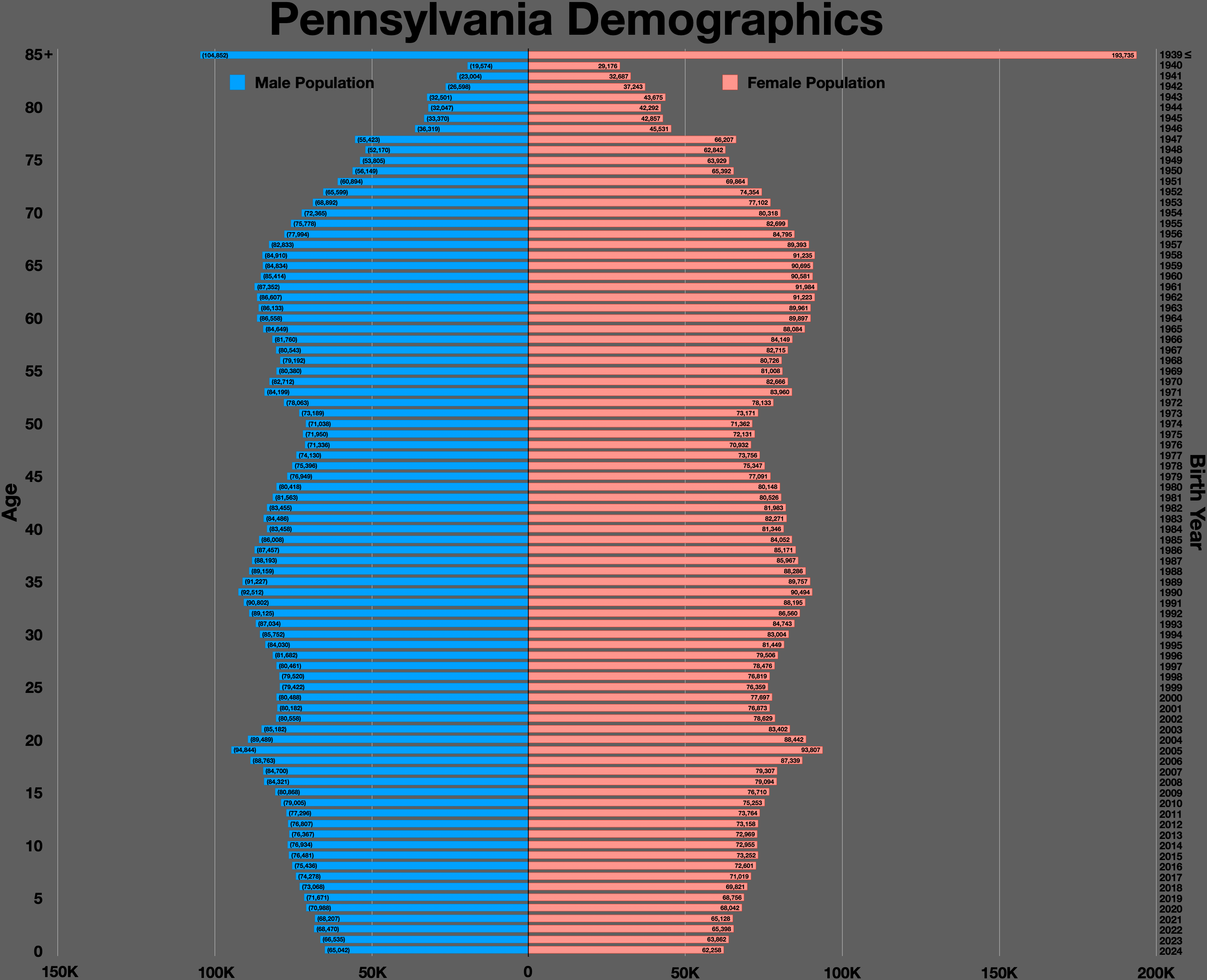
Pennsylvania population pyramid

As of the 2020 U.S. census, Pennsylvania had a population of 13,011,844, up from 12,702,379 in 2010. Pennsylvania is the fifth-most populated state in the U.S. after California, Texas, Florida, and New York, and having overtaken Illinois as of the 2020 census. In 2019, net migration to other states resulted in a decrease of 27,718, and immigration from other countries resulted in an increase of 127,007. Net migration to Pennsylvania was 98,289. Migration of native Pennsylvanians resulted in a decrease of 100,000 people. 7.2% of the population was foreign-born as of 2021. Pennsylvania's center of population is in Duncannon in Perry County.

According to the U.S. Department of Housing and Urban Development's 2022 Annual Homeless Assessment Report, there were an estimated 12,691 homeless people in Pennsylvania.

=== Place of origin ===
Among Pennsylvania residents, as of 2020, nearly three out of four, 74.5%, are native to the state and were born in Pennsylvania, 18.4% were born in a different U.S. state, 1.5% were born in Puerto Rico, U.S. Island areas, or born abroad to American parent(s), and 5.6% were foreign born. Foreign-born Pennsylvanians are largely from Asia (36.0%), Europe (35.9%), and Latin America (30.6%) with the remainder from Africa (5%), North America (3.1%), and Oceania (0.4%). The state's largest ancestry groups, expressed as a percentage of total people who responded with a particular ancestry for the 2010 census, were German 28.5%, Irish 18.2%, Italian 12.8%, African Americans 9.6%, English 8.5%, Polish 7.2%, and French 4.2%. As of 2018, the top countries of origin for Pennsylvania's immigrants were India, the Dominican Republic, China, Mexico, and Vietnam.

=== Race and ethnicity ===
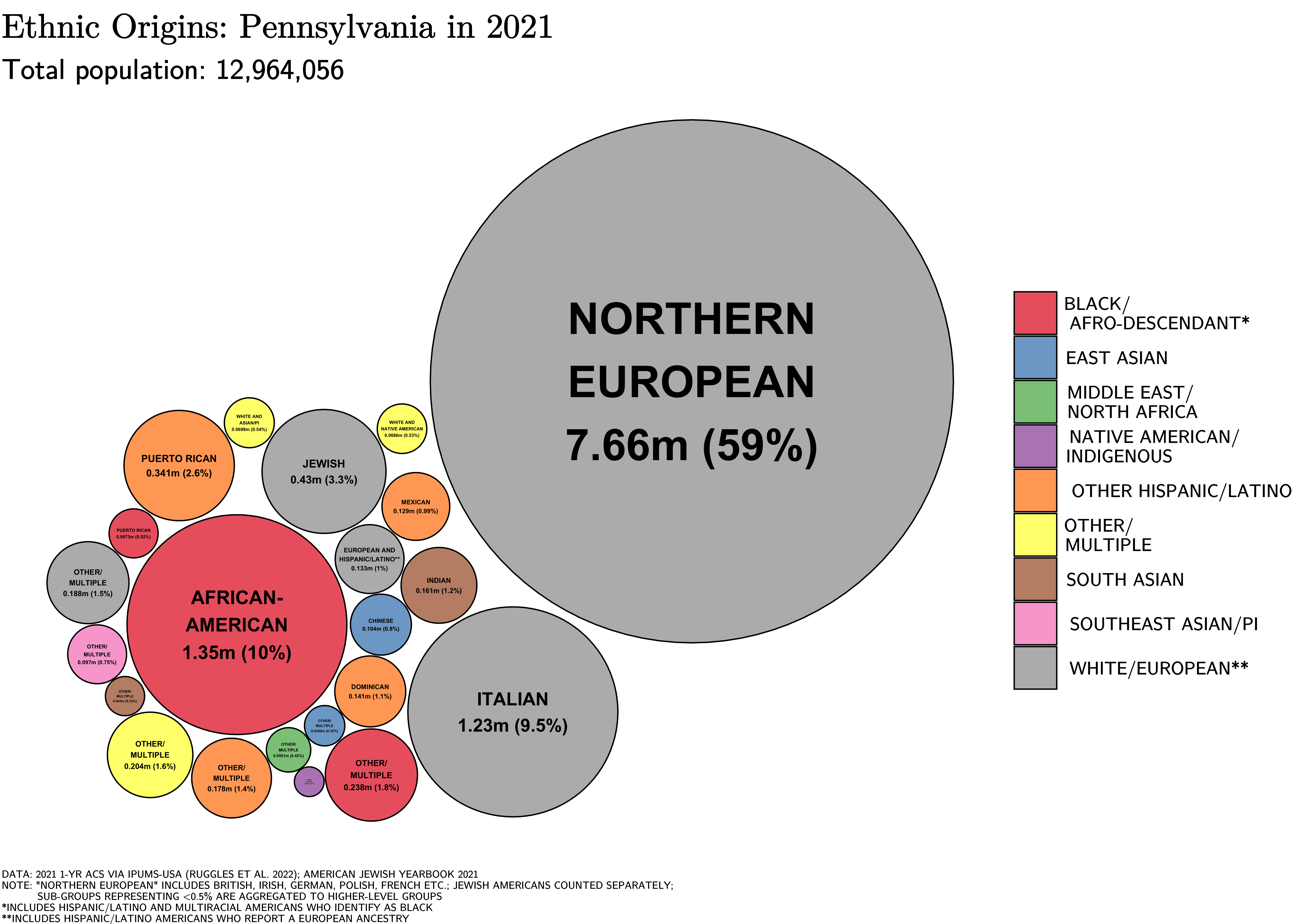
Ethnic origins of Pennsylvanians

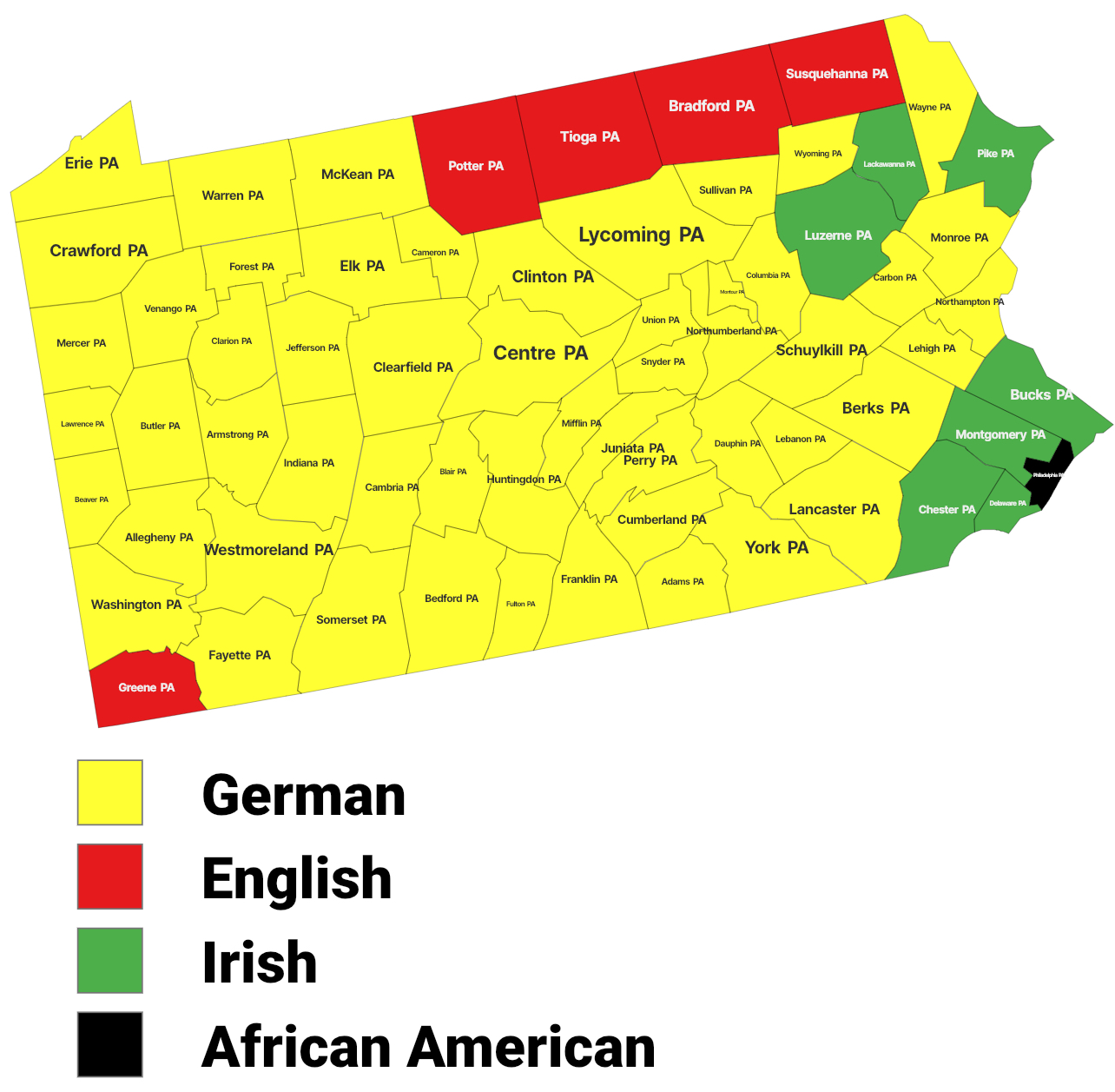
Largest alone or in any combination ethnic origin by county in Pennsylvania, per the 2020 census

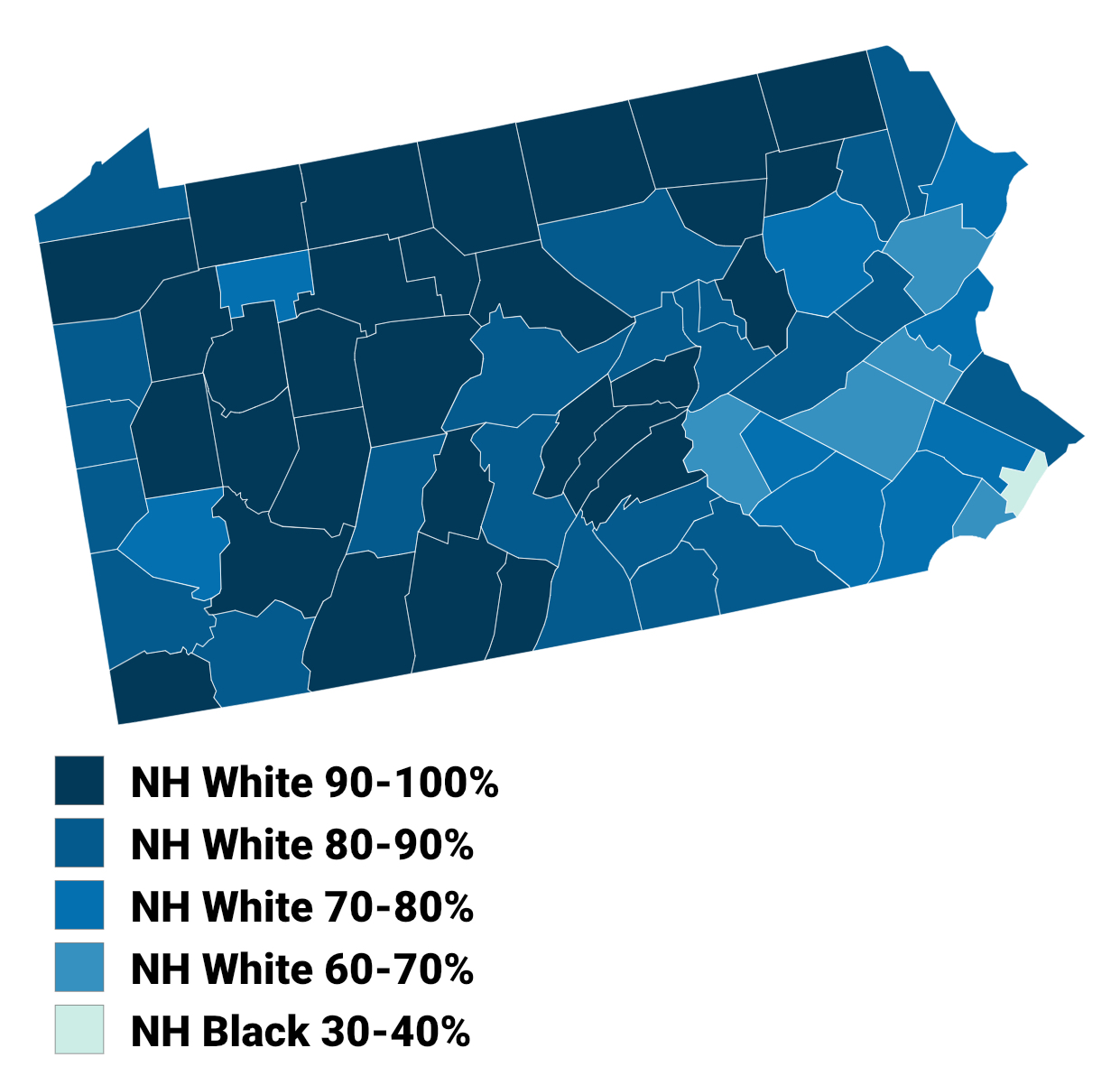
Map of counties in Pennsylvania by racial and ethnic plurality, per the 2020 U.S. census

The vast majority of Pennsylvania's population is made up of Whites, Blacks, Hispanics, and Asian Americans. Non-Hispanic Whites make up the majority of Pennsylvania; they are mostly descended from German, Irish, Scottish, Welsh, Italian, and English immigrants. Rural portions of South Central Pennsylvania are recognized nationally for their Amish communities. Wyoming Valley, including Scranton and Wilkes-Barre, has the highest percentage of white residents of any metropolitan area with a population of 500,000 or above in the U.S.; in Wyoming Valley, 96.2% of the population claim to be white with no Hispanic background. Romani people have been present in the state since the mid-1800s.

The state's Hispanic or Latino American population grew by 82.6% between 2000 and 2010, marking one of the largest increases in a state's Hispanic population. The significant growth of the Hispanic or Latino population is due to migration to the state mainly from Puerto Rico, a U.S. territory, and to a lesser extent immigration from countries such as the Dominican Republic, Mexico, and various Central and South American nations and a wave of Hispanic and Latinos leaving New York City and New Jersey for more affordable living.

The majority of Hispanic or Latino Americans in Pennsylvania are of Puerto Rican descent. Most of the remaining Hispanic or Latino population is made up of Mexicans and Dominicans, and the majority of Hispanics and Latinos are concentrated in Philadelphia, the Lehigh Valley, and South Central Pennsylvania. The Hispanic or Latino population is greatest in Bethlehem, Allentown, Reading, Lancaster, York, and around Philadelphia. As of 2010, the vast majority of Hispanics and Latino Americans in Pennsylvania, about 85%, live within a 150-mile (240 km) radius of Philadelphia, and about 20% live in the city itself.

Pennsylvania's Asian population more than doubled between 2000 and 2020, comprising mostly Indian, Chinese, Vietnamese, Korean, and Filipino immigrants, and many Asians moving to Philadelphia from New York City. The rapid growth of this community has given Pennsylvania one of the largest Asian populations in the nation.

Among the state's black population, the vast majority in the state are African American. There are also a growing number of black residents of West Indian, recent African, and Hispanic or Latino origins. Most Blacks live in the Philadelphia area, Pittsburgh, or South Central Pennsylvania. Additionally, in 2020, 31,052 identified as being Native American alone, and 158,112 did in combination with one or more other races.

Racial and ethnic composition as of the 2020 census
| Race and ethnicity | Alone | Total |
|---|---|---|
| White (non-Hispanic) | 73.4% | 76.6% |
| African American (non-Hispanic) | 10.5% | 11.8% |
| Hispanic or Latino (Note: Persons of Hispanic or Latino origin are not distinguished between total and partial ancestry.) | — | 8.1% |
| Asian | 3.9% | 4.5% |
| Native American | 0.1% | 1.1% |
| Pacific Islander | 0.02% | 0.1% |
| Other | 0.4% | 1.3% |

Historical racial and ethnic composition to 2020
| Racial and ethnic composition | 1990 | 2000 | 2010 | 2020 |
|---|---|---|---|---|
| White | 88.5% | 85.4% | 81.9% | 75.0% |
| Black | 9.2% | 10.0% | 10.9% | 10.9% |
| Asian | 1.2% | 1.8% | 2.8% | 3.9% |
| Native | 0.1% | 0.1% | 0.2% | 0.2% |
| Native Hawaiians and other Pacific Islanders | – | – | – | – |
| Other race | 1.0% | 1.5% | 2.4% | 3.9% |
| Two or more races | – | 1.2% | 1.9% | 6.0% |

Pennsylvania – Racial and ethnic composition Note: the US Census treats Hispanic/Latino as an ethnic category. This table excludes Latinos from the racial categories and assigns them to a separate category. Hispanics/Latinos may be of any race.
| Race / Ethnicity (NH = Non-Hispanic) | Pop 1980 | Pop 1990 | Pop 2000 | Pop 2010 | Pop 2020 | % 1980 | % 1990 | % 2000 | % 2010 | % 2020 |
|---|---|---|---|---|---|---|---|---|---|---|
| White alone (NH) | 10,575,827 | 10,422,058 | 10,322,455 | 10,094,652 | 9,553,417 | 89.14% | 87.72% | 84.05% | 79.47% | 73.47% |
| Black or African American alone (NH) | 1,037,346 | 1,072,459 | 1,202,437 | 1,327,091 | 1,368,978 | 8.74% | 9.03% | 9.79% | 10.45% | 10.53% |
| Native American or Alaska Native alone (NH) | 9,465 | 13,505 | 14,904 | 16,909 | 15,028 | 0.08% | 0.11% | 0.12% | 0.13% | 0.12% |
| Asian alone (NH) | 64,379 | 134,056 | 218,296 | 346,288 | 506,674 | 0.54% | 1.13% | 1.78% | 2.73% | 3.90% |
| Native Hawaiian or Pacific Islander alone (NH) | x | x | 2,691 | 2,715 | 3,162 | x | x | 0.02% | 0.02% | 0.02% |
| Other race alone (NH) | 22,917 | 7,303 | 13,086 | 16,469 | 54,541 | 0.19% | 0.06% | 0.11% | 0.13% | 0.42% |
| Mixed race or Multiracial (NH) | x | x | 113,097 | 178,595 | 451,285 | x | x | 0.92% | 1.41% | 3.47% |
| Hispanic or Latino (any race) | 153,961 | 232,262 | 394,088 | 719,660 | 1,049,615 | 1.30% | 1.95% | 3.21% | 5.67% | 8.07% |
| Total | 11,863,895 | 11,881,643 | 12,281,054 | 12,702,379 | 13,002,700 | 100.00% | 100.00% | 100.00% | 100.00% | 100.00% |

==== 2025 American Community Survey one-year estimates ====
| Racial Makeup of Pennsylvania (2025): 1. White alone (72.3%); 2. Black alone (10.6%); 3. Native American alone (0.32%); 4. Asian Alone (4.43%); 5. Pacific Islander Alone (0.04%); 6. Other race alone (3.79%); 7. Two or more races (8.50%) | Racial/Ethnic Makeup of Pennsylvania excluding Hispanics from racial categories (2025); NH=Non-Hispanic: 1. White NH (70.6%); 2. Black NH (10.1%); 3. Native American NH (0.15%); 4. Asian NH (4.39%); 5. Pacific Islander NH (0.02%); 6. Other race NH (0.43%); 7. Two or more races NH (4.40%); 8. Hispanic Any Race (9.91%) | Racial Makeup of Hispanics in Pennsylvania (2025): 1. White alone (17.3%); 2. Black alone (5.21%); 3. Native American alone (1.70%); 4. Asian Alone (0.42%); 5. Pacific Islander Alone (0.15%); 6. Other race alone (33.9%); 7. Two or more races (41.4%) |

=== Vital statistics ===
Note: data for births of White Hispanic origin have not been collected, but included in one Hispanic group; people of Hispanic origin may be of any race.

Live births by single race/ethnicity of mother
| Race | 2014 | 2015 | 2016 | 2017 | 2018 | 2019 | 2020 | 2021 | 2022 | 2023 | 2024 |
|---|---|---|---|---|---|---|---|---|---|---|---|
| White | 99,306 (69.8%) | 97,845 (69.4%) | 94,520 (67.8%) | 92,297 (67.0%) | 90,862 (67.0%) | 88,710 (66.1%) | 85,956 (65.8%) | 88,168 (66.5%) | 85,031 (65.3%) | 82,284 (64.8%) | 81,773 (64.3%) |
| Black | 24,024 (16.9%) | 24,100 (17.1%) | 18,338 (13.1%) | 18,400 (13.4%) | 17,779 (13.1%) | 17,585 (13.1%) | 17,118 (13.1%) | 16,748 (12.6%) | 16,616 (12.8%) | 15,766 (12.4%) | 15,073 (11.8%) |
| Asian | 7,067 (5.0%) | 6,961 (4.9%) | 6,466 (4.6%) | 6,401 (4.6%) | 6,207 (4.6%) | 6,214 (4.6%) | 6,074 (4.6%) | 5,980 (4.5%) | 6,212 (4.8%) | 6,028 (4.7%) | 6,305 (4.9%) |
| American Indian | 368 (0.3%) | 390 (0.3%) | 86 (0.1%) | 135 (0.1%) | 128 (0.1%) | 119 (0.1%) | 83 (>0.1%) | 88 (>0.1%) | 162 (0.1%) | 141 (0.1%) | 154 (0.1%) |
| Hispanic (any race) | 14,496 (10.2%) | 14,950 (10.6%) | 15,348 (11.0%) | 15,840 (11.5%) | 15,826 (11.7%) | 16,718 (12.5%) | 16,741 (12.8%) | 17,163 (12.9%) | 18,118 (13.9%) | 18,505 (14.6%) | 19,702 (15.4%) |
| Total | 142,268 (100%) | 141,047 (100%) | 139,409 (100%) | 137,745 (100%) | 135,673 (100%) | 134,230 (100%) | 130,693 (100%) | 132,622 (100%) | 130,252 (100%) | 126,951 (100%) | 127,299 (100%) |

=== Age and poverty ===
As of the 2010 census, Pennsylvania had the fourth-highest proportion of elderly (65+) citizens in the nation at 15.4%, compared to a national average of 13.0%. According to U.S. Census Bureau estimates, the state's poverty rate was 12.5% in 2017 compared to 13.4% for the U.S. as a whole.

=== Languages ===
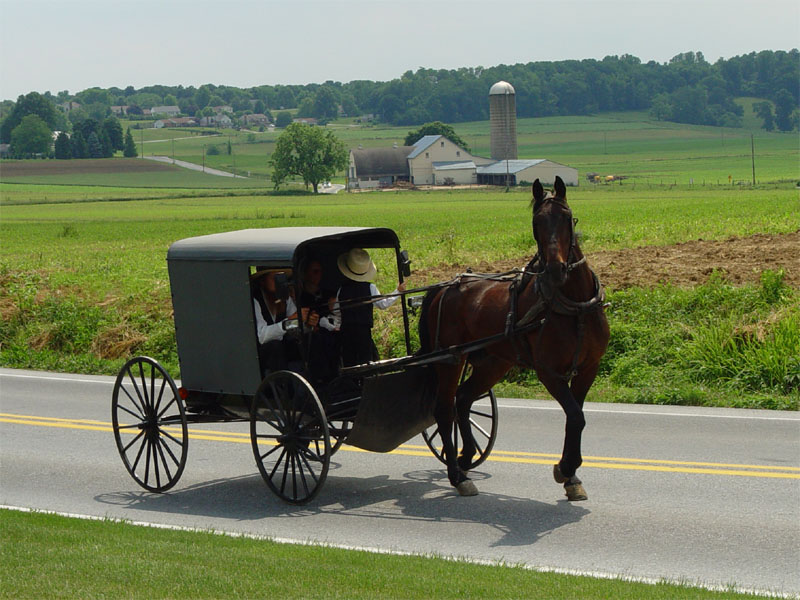
An Amish family riding in a traditional Amish buggy in Lancaster County. As of 2024, Pennsylvania has an Amish population of 92,660, the largest of any state in the nation.

As of 2010, 90.2% (10,710,239) of Pennsylvania residents age five and older spoke English at home as a primary language while 4.1% (486,058) spoke Spanish, 0.9% (103,502) spoke German, including Pennsylvania Dutch, and 0.5% (56,052) spoke Chinese, including Mandarin. In total, 9.9% (1,170,628) of Pennsylvania's population age 5 and older spoke a mother tongue other than English.

==== Pennsylvania Dutch language ====
Pennsylvania German, spoken by nearly one percent of Pennsylvania's population as of 2010, is often misleadingly called Pennsylvania Dutch. The term Dutch used to mean German, (including, at the time, from the Netherlands) before the Latin derived "German" replaced it. When referring to the language spoken by the Pennsylvania Dutch people, Pennsylvania German, it means German - the modern German language word for "German" is "Deutsch" - cognate with the Pennsylvania German word "Deitsch". Pennsylvania German is a descendant of German from the West Central German dialect family and is closest to Palatine German. Pennsylvania German is still very vigorous as a first language among Old Order Amish and Old Order Mennonites, principally in the Lancaster County and Berks County areas; it is almost extinct as an everyday language outside the plain communities, though a few words have passed into English usage.

=== Religion ===
Religious self-identification in Pennsylvania (April 2023 Franklin & Marshall College poll)
1. Unaffiliated (32.0%)
2. Protestantism (29.0%)
3. Catholicism (24.0%)
4. Other (14.0%)

Of the original Thirteen Colonies, Pennsylvania and Rhode Island had the most religious freedom. Voltaire, writing of William Penn in 1733, observed: "The new sovereign also enacted several wise and wholesome laws for his colony, which have remained invariably the same to this day. The chief is, to ill-treat no person on account of religion, and to consider as brethren all those who believe in one God." One result of this uncommon freedom was a wide religious diversity, which continues to the present.

Pennsylvania's population in 2010 was 12,702,379; of these, 6,838,440 (53.8%) were estimated to belong to some sort of organized religion. According to the Association of Religion Data Archives (ARDA) at Pennsylvania State University, the largest religious bodies in Pennsylvania by adherents were the Catholic Church with 3,503,028 adherents, the United Methodist Church with 591,734 members, and the Evangelical Lutheran Church in America with 501,974 members. Since 2014, among the state's religious population, 73% were Christian, according to Pew Research Center. In 2020, the Public Religion Research Institute estimated 68% of the population identified with Christianity. As of 2014, 47% of all Pennsylvanians identified as Protestants, making Protestantism far and away the most prominent religious affiliation among Pennsylvanians. Among all self-identified Christians in the state, however, 24% identified as Catholics, the most of any Christian religious affiliation. In April 2023, a Franklin & Marshall College poll found that a plurality of Pennsylvania residents were unaffiliated, with the rest predominately being Protestant or Catholic.

Pennsylvania, especially the Greater Pittsburgh area, has one of the largest communities of Presbyterians in the nation, the third-highest by percentage of population and the largest outright in membership as Protestant Christians. The American Presbyterian Church, with about 250,000 members and 1,011 congregations, is the largest Presbyterian denomination, and the Presbyterian Church in America is also significant, with 112 congregations and approximately 23,000 adherents; the EPC has around 50 congregations, including the ECO, according to 2010 estimates. The fourth-largest Protestant denomination, the United Church of Christ, has 180,000 members and 627 congregations in the state. The American Baptist Churches USA, also referred to as the Northern Baptist Convention is based in King of Prussia.

Pennsylvania was the center state of the German Reformed denomination from the 1700s. Bethlehem is one of the headquarters of the Moravian Church in the U.S. Pennsylvania also has a very large Amish population, second only to Ohio among U.S. states. As of 2000, there was a total Amish population of 47,860 in Pennsylvania and an additional 146,416 Mennonites and 91,200 Brethren. The total Anabaptist population including Bruderhof was 232,631, about two percent of the population. While Pennsylvania owes its existence to Quakers, and much of the historic character of Pennsylvania is ideologically rooted in the teachings of the Religious Society of Friends (as they are officially known), practicing Quakers are a small minority of about 10,000 adherents as of 2010.

== Economy ==
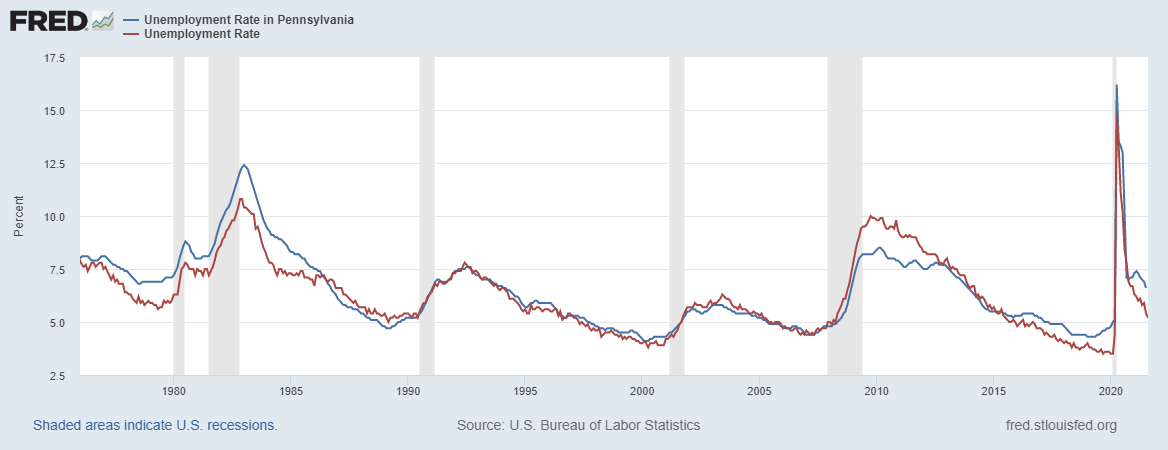
A graph of unemployment in Pennsylvania vs United States average

In 2025, Pennsylvania's gross state product (GSP) was $1.056 trillion, the sixth-largest among all U.S. states, behind California, Texas, New York, Florida, and Illinois. If Pennsylvania were an independent country, its economy, as of 2023, would rank as the 20th-largest in the world. On a per capita basis, Pennsylvania's per capita personal income was $74,231 in 2025, ranked 22nd among the 50 states and the District of Columbia. As of 2016, there were 5,354,964 people in employment in Pennsylvania with 301,484 total employer establishments. In 2025, 99.6% of businesses in Pennsylvania were small businesses, and employed 45.2% of the state's work force. As of May 2025, the state's unemployment rate is 3.9%.

The state has five manufacturing centers: Philadelphia in the southeast, Pittsburgh in the southwest, Erie in the northwest, Scranton-Wilkes-Barre in the northeast, and the Lehigh Valley in the east. Since the inception of the 21st century, Pennsylvania has garnered the additional nickname of "Cellicon State" for the central role of Philadelphia and Pittsburgh in the development of immunotherapies to treat different cancers.

Pennsylvania is home to 23 of the nation's 500 largest companies that comprise the Fortune 500, including two that rank in the top 100, Cencora (formerly AmeriSource Bergen) in Conshohocken, which is the nation's 11th-largest company, and Comcast in Philadelphia, which is the 29th-largest. Philadelphia is home to six of the Fortune 500 companies, with more located in suburbs like King of Prussia; it is a leader in the financial and insurance industries. Pittsburgh is home to eight Fortune 500 companies, including U.S. Steel, PPG Industries, Heinz, and GE Transportation. Hershey is home to The Hershey Company, one of the world's largest chocolate manufacturers. In eastern Pennsylvania, the Lehigh Valley has become an epicenter for the growth of the U.S. logistics industry, including warehousing and the intermodal transport of goods.

Like many U.S. states, Walmart is the largest private employer in Pennsylvania. The state's second-largest employer is the University of Pennsylvania, an Ivy League private research university in Philadelphia. Pennsylvania is home to the oldest investor-owned utility company in the U.S., The York Water Company.

As of 2018, Pennsylvania ranks first in the nation in a few economic sectors and niches, including barrels of beer produced annually (3.9 million), farmers' markets (over 6,000), food processing companies (2,300), hardwood lumber production (a billion board feet annually), mushroom farms (68), natural gas production, potato chip manufacturing (24 facilities manufacturing one-fourth of the nation's total), and pretzel manufacturing (80 percent of the nation's total).

Other notable Pennsylvania companies include C. F. Martin & Company, based in Nazareth, which manufacturers Martin Guitars, used by some of the world's most prominent guitarists, including Johnny Cash, Elvis Presley, Bob Dylan, Neil Young, John Lennon, Kurt Cobain, Eric Clapton, and others.

=== Agriculture ===
Pennsylvania ranks 19th overall among U.S. states in agricultural production. Its leading agricultural products are mushrooms, apples, Christmas trees, layer chickens, nursery, sod, milk, corn for silage, grapes (including juice grapes), and horses production. Pennsylvania ranks eighth in the nation in winemaking.

The Pennsylvania Department of Agriculture worked with private companies to establish "PA Preferred" as a way to brand agricultural products grown or made in the state. The financial impact of agriculture in Pennsylvania includes employment of more than 66,800 people employed by the food manufacturing industry and over $1.7 billion in food product export as of 2011.

=== Banking ===
The first nationally chartered bank in the U.S., the Bank of North America, was founded in 1781 in Philadelphia. After a series of mergers, the Bank of North America is now part of Wells Fargo. Pennsylvania is home to the first nationally chartered bank under the 1863 National Banking Act. That year, the Pittsburgh Savings & Trust Company received a national charter and renamed itself the First National Bank of Pittsburgh as part of the National Banking Act. That bank is still in existence today as PNC and remains based in Pittsburgh. PNC is currently the state's largest and the nation's sixth-largest bank.

=== Film ===
The Pennsylvania Film Production Tax Credit began in 2004 and stimulated the development of a film industry in the state.

=== Gambling ===
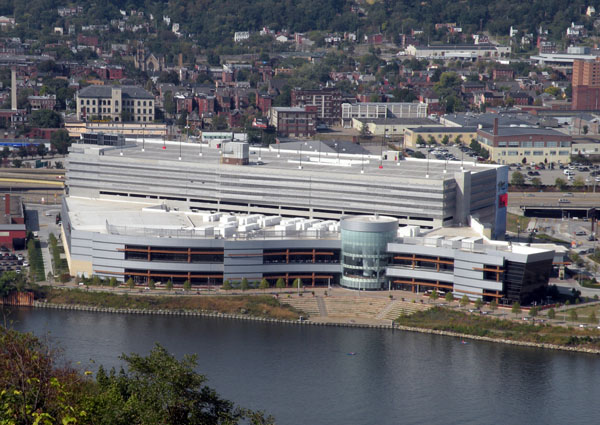
Rivers Casino, located in the Chateau section of Pittsburgh on the Ohio River, one of Pennsylvania's 17 casinos

Casino gambling was legalized in Pennsylvania in 2004. As of 2010, there are 17 casinos in the state.

=== Mining ===
Coal mining in Pennsylvania dates back to the mid-1700s. Since then, over 15 billion tons of coal were removed from the state. Production peaked in 1918. As mine output decreased, some 250,000 acres of mine land were abandoned. As of 2024, the state has the largest inventory of abandoned mines in the United States, creating environmental problems such as water pollution and ground subsidence which damages above-ground buildings. Allegheny and Westmoreland counties alone account for over 550 abandoned sites. The Pennsylvania Department of Environmental Protection is responsible for remediation of such problems.

=== Healthcare ===
Pennsylvania has 52 trauma centers, including 20 Level 1 trauma centers.

As of 2024, Highmark is the dominant health insurance company in most regions with the exception of the Philadelphia metropolitan area where Independence Blue Cross is number one and the Bloomsburg–Berwick metropolitan area where Geisinger Health System is dominant. Across the state, CVS (Aetna) is second. Other major companies providing insurance plans include Capital Blue Cross, UnitedHealth, and University of Pittsburgh Medical Center.

== State government ==
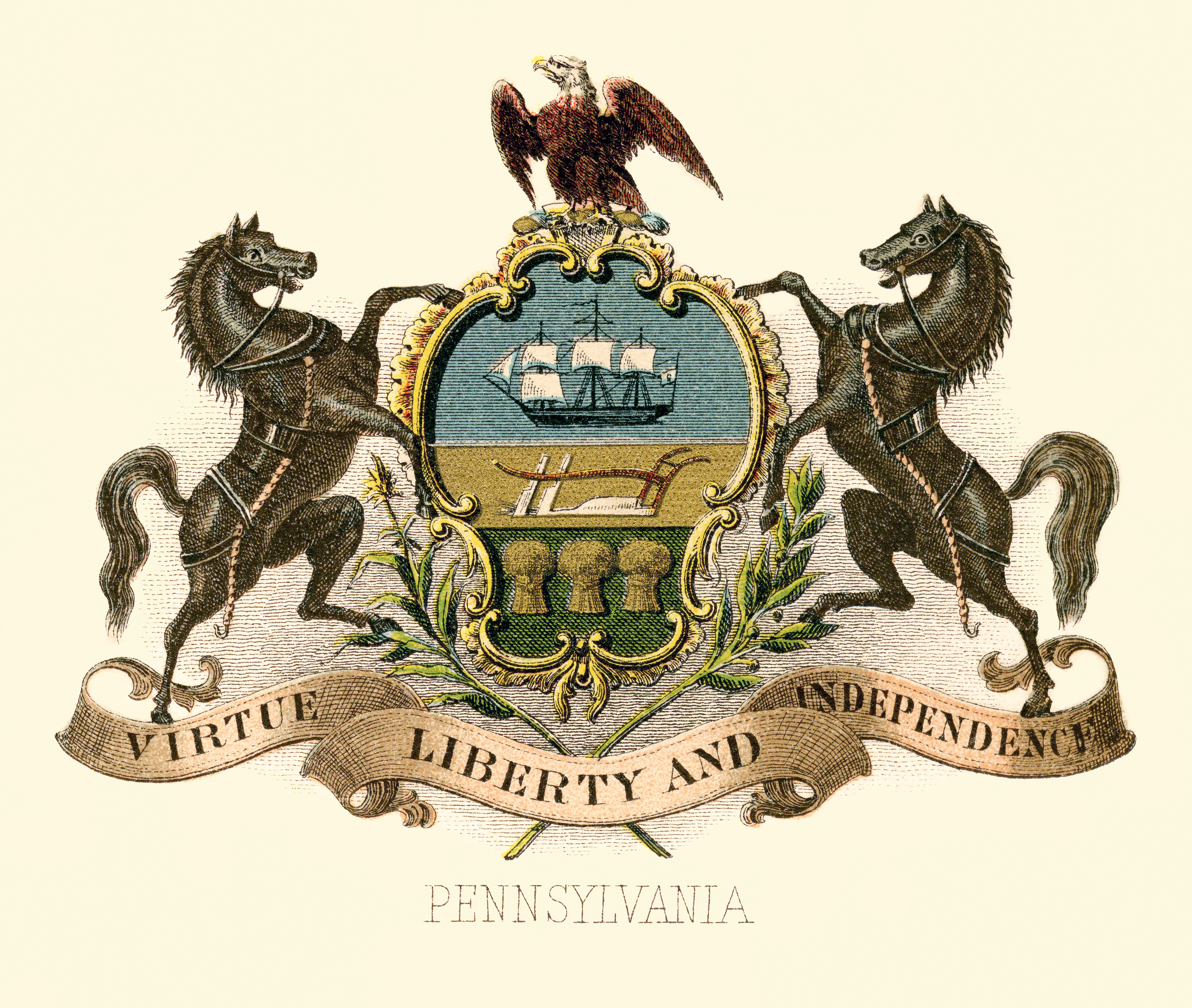
Historical coat of arms of Pennsylvania (illustrated, 1876)

Pennsylvania has had five constitutions during its statehood: 1776, 1790, 1838, 1874, and 1968. Before that the province of Pennsylvania was governed for a century by a Frame of Government, of which there were four versions: 1682, 1683, 1696, and 1701. The capital of Pennsylvania is Harrisburg. The legislature meets there in the State Capitol.

In a 2020 study, Pennsylvania was ranked as the 19th-hardest state for citizens to vote.

=== Executive ===
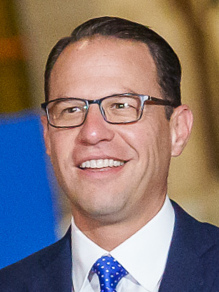
Josh Shapiro, the current and 48th Governor of Pennsylvania

The current governor is Josh Shapiro. The other elected officials composing the executive branch are the Lieutenant Governor Austin Davis, Attorney General Dave Sunday, Auditor General Timothy DeFoor, and Pennsylvania Treasurer Stacy Garrity. The Governor and Lieutenant Governor run as a ticket in the general election and are up for re-election every four years during the midterm elections. The elections for Attorney General, Auditor General, and Treasurer are held every four years coinciding with a Presidential election.

=== Legislative ===
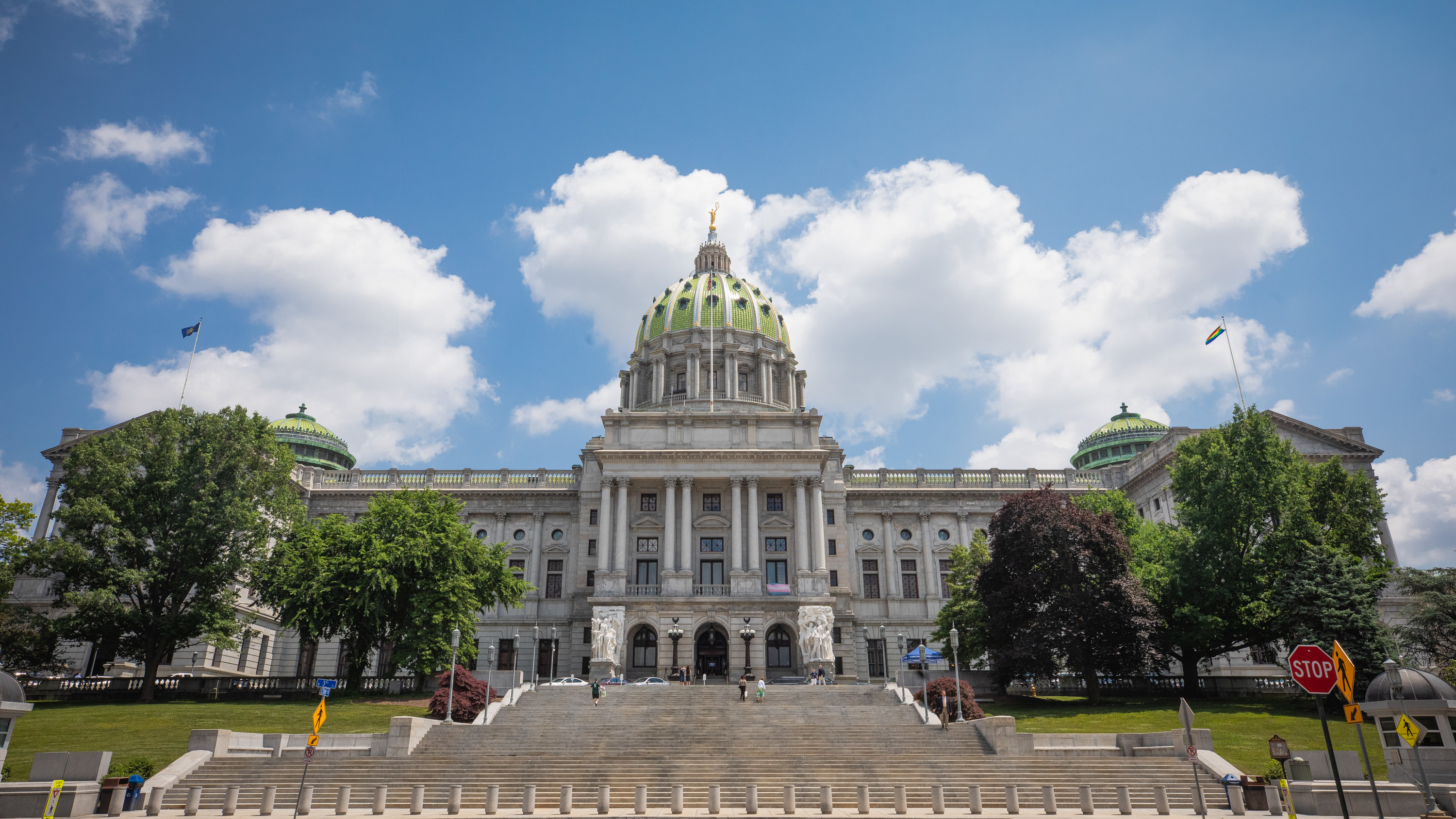
The Pennsylvania State Capitol in Harrisburg

Pennsylvania has a bicameral legislature that was established in the Pennsylvania Constitution, which was ratified in 1790. The original Frame of Government of William Penn had a unicameral legislature. The General Assembly includes 50 senators and 203 representatives. Kim L. Ward is currently president pro tempore of the State Senate, Joe Pittman the majority leader, and Jay Costa the minority leader. Joanna McClinton is speaker of the House of Representatives, with Matthew Bradford as majority leader and Bryan Cutler as minority leader. As of 2025, the Republicans hold the majority in the State Senate (27–23) and the Democrats in the State House (102–101). Pennsylvania is one of four states that currently have divided party control of the state legislature.

=== Judiciary ===
Pennsylvania is divided into 60 judicial districts. With the exception of Philadelphia County, most have district justices and justices of the peace who preside over most preliminary hearings in felony and misdemeanor offenses, all minor (summary) criminal offenses, and small civil claims. Most criminal and civil cases originate in the Courts of Common Pleas, which also serve as appellate court. The Superior Court hears all appeals from the Courts of Common Pleas not expressly designated to the Commonwealth Court or Supreme Court. The Superior Court also has original jurisdiction to review probable cause governmental requests for warrants in wiretap surveillance. The Commonwealth Court is limited to appeals from final orders of certain state agencies and certain designated cases from the Courts of Common Pleas. The Supreme Court of Pennsylvania is the state's final appellate court. All judges in Pennsylvania are elected, and the chief justice of the state's Supreme Court is determined by seniority.

=== Local government ===
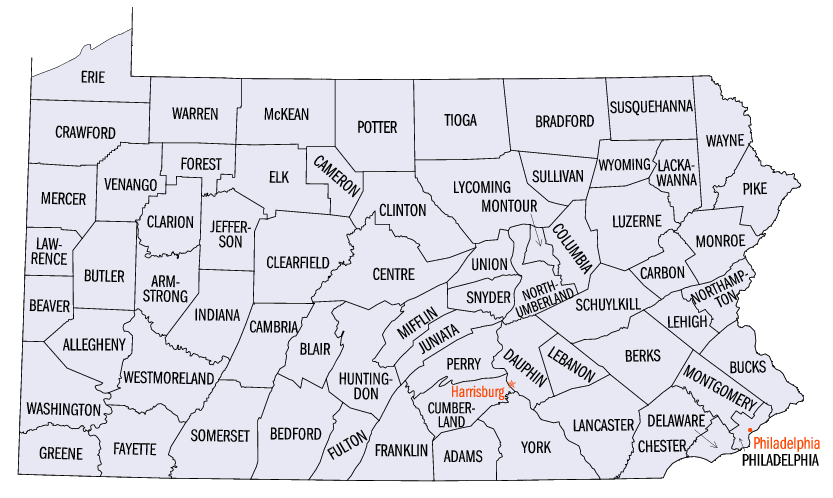
Map of Pennsylvania's 67 counties

Pennsylvania Municipalities

Pennsylvania is divided into 67 counties. Counties are further subdivided into municipalities that are either incorporated as cities, boroughs, or townships. The most populous county in Pennsylvania and 24th-most populous county in the United States is Philadelphia County, which includes the city of Philadelphia, with a 2020 population of 1,603,797; the state's least populous county is Cameron with a population of 4,547.

There are a total of 56 cities in Pennsylvania, which are classified by population as either first-class, second-class, or third-class cities. Philadelphia, the state's largest city with a population exceeding 1.6 million, is Pennsylvania's only first-class city. Pittsburgh (303,000) and Scranton (76,000) are second-class and second-class 'A' cities, respectively. All of the state's remaining cities including Allentown, the state's third-largest city, and Reading, its fourth-largest, to Parker, the state's smallest city with a population of only 820, are designated as third-class cities. First- and second-class cities are governed by a "strong mayor" form of mayor–council government, whereas third-class cities are governed by either a "weak mayor" form of government or a council–manager government.

Pennsylvania boroughs are generally smaller in population than the state's cities, and most of the state's cities were incorporated as boroughs prior to being designated cities. There are 958 boroughs in Pennsylvania, all of which are governed by the "weak mayor" form of mayor-council government. The largest borough in Pennsylvania is State College (40,501) and the smallest is Centralia.

Townships are the third type of municipality in Pennsylvania and are classified as either first-class or second-class townships. There are 1,454 second-class townships and 93 first-class townships. Second-class townships can become first-class townships if they have a population density greater than 300 inhabitants per square mile (120/km^{2}) and a referendum is passed supporting the change. Pennsylvania's largest township is Upper Darby Township (85,681), and the smallest is East Keating Township.

There is one exception to the types of municipalities in Pennsylvania: Bloomsburg was incorporated as a town in 1870 and is, officially, the only town in the state. In 1975, McCandless Township adopted a home-rule charter under the name of "Town of McCandless", but is, legally, still a first-class township. The state has 56 cities, 958 boroughs, 93 first-class townships, 1,454 second-class townships, and one town (Bloomsburg) for a total of 2,562 municipalities.

=== Taxation ===
Pennsylvania had the 15th-highest state and local tax burden in the nation as of 2012, according to the Tax Foundation. Residents paid a total of $83.7 billion in state and local taxes with a per capita average of $4,589 annually. Residents share 76% of the total tax burden. Many state politicians have tried to increase the share of taxes paid by out-of-state sources. Suggested revenue sources include taxing natural gas drilling as Pennsylvania is the only state without such a tax on gas drilling. Additional revenue prospects include trying to place tolls on interstate highways; specifically Interstate 80, which is used heavily by out of state commuters with high maintenance costs.

Sales taxes provide 39% of Pennsylvania's state revenue; personal income taxes 34%; motor vehicle taxes about 12%, and taxes on cigarettes and alcoholic beverages 5%. The personal income tax is a flat 3.07%. An individual's taxable income is based on the following eight types of income: compensation (salary); interest; dividends; net profits from the operation of a business, profession or farm; net gains or income from the dispositions of property; net gains or income from rents, royalties, patents and copyrights; income derived through estates or trusts; and gambling and lottery winnings (other than Pennsylvania Lottery winnings).

Counties, municipalities, and school districts levy taxes on real estate. In addition, some local bodies assess a wage tax on personal income. Generally, the total wage tax rate is capped at 1% of income but some municipalities with home rule charters may charge more than 1%. Thirty-two of Pennsylvania's sixty-seven counties levy a personal property tax on stocks, bonds, and similar holdings. With the exception of the city of Philadelphia, Pennsylvania, municipalities and school districts are allowed to enact a local earned income tax within the purview of Act 32. Residents of these municipalities and school districts are required to file a local income tax return in addition to federal and state returns. This local return is filed with the local income tax collector, a private collection agency appointed by a particular county to collect the local earned income and local services tax (the latter a flat fee deducted from salaried employees working within a particular municipality or school district).

Philadelphia has its own local income taxation system. Philadelphia-based employers are required to withhold the Philadelphia wage tax from the salaries of their employees. Residents of Philadelphia working for an employer are not required to file a local return as long as their Philadelphia wage tax is fully withheld by their employer. If their employer does not withhold the Philadelphia wage tax, residents are required to register with the Revenue Department and file an Earnings Tax return. Residents of Philadelphia with self-employment income are required to file a Net Profits Tax (NPT) return, while those with business income from Philadelphia sources are required to obtain a Commercial Activity License (CAL) and pay the Business Income and Receipts Tax (BIRT) and the NPT. Residents with unearned income except interest from checking and savings accounts are required to file and pay the School Income-tax (SIT).

The complexity of Pennsylvania's local tax filing system has been criticized by experts, who note that the outsourcing of collections to private entities is akin to tax farming and that many new residents are caught off guard and end up facing failure to file penalties even if they did not owe any tax. Attempts to transfer local income tax collections to the state level by having a separate local section on the state income tax return, currently the method used to collect local income taxes in New York, Maryland, Indiana, and Iowa, have been unsuccessful.

=== State law enforcement ===
The Pennsylvania State Police is the chief law enforcement agency in the Pennsylvania.

== Politics ==
Voter registration totals as of October 13, 2025:
| Party | Registered voters | Percentage |
|---|---|---|
| Democratic | 3,808,415 | 42.81% |
| Republican | 3,640,700 | 40.93% |
| Unaffiliated | 1,126,700 | 12.67% |
| Other/minor parties | 319,478 | 3.59% |
| Total | 8,895,293 | 100.00% |

2024 U.S. presidential election results by county in Pennsylvania Democratic Republican

Since the latter half of the 20th century, Pennsylvania has been perceived as a powerful swing state, and winning Pennsylvania has since been deemed as essential to U.S. presidential candidates. Only thrice between 1932 and 1988 (1932, 1948, and 1968, with Franklin D. Roosevelt, Harry S. Truman, and Richard Nixon, respectively) has a presidential candidate been able to win the White House while losing Pennsylvania.

Between 1992 and 2016, Pennsylvania trended Democratic in presidential elections; Bill Clinton won the state twice by large margins and Al Gore won it by a slightly closer margin in 2000. In the 2004 presidential election, John F. Kerry beat President George W. Bush in Pennsylvania, 2,938,095 (51%) to 2,793,847 (48%). In the 2008 presidential election, Democrat Barack Obama defeated Republican John McCain in Pennsylvania, 3,276,363 (54%) to 2,655,885 (44%).

In the 2016 United States presidential election, however, Republican Donald Trump broke the Democratic streak in the state, winning by 2,970,733 (48%) votes to 2,926,441 (47%) votes. The state returned to the Democratic column in 2020 by voting for Joe Biden over Trump, 3,458,229 (50%) to 3,377,674 (49%). In 2024, Pennsylvania swung back to Trump, with the former president winning 3,543,308 (50%) to Vice President Kamala Harris's 3,423,042 (49%). The state holds 19 electoral votes.

Despite voting for the Democratic ticket for president in every election between 1992 and 2012, Pennsylvania has a history of electing Republican U.S. senators. From 2009 to 2011, the state was represented by two Democratic senators for the first time since 1947 after Republican Senator Arlen Specter switched party affiliation. In 2010, Republicans recaptured a U.S. Senate seat and a majority of the state's congressional seats, control of both chambers of the state legislature, and the governorship. Democrats won back the governorship, however, four years later in the 2014 election. It was the first time since a governor became eligible for reelection that an incumbent governor had been defeated in a reelection bid.

Historically, Democratic strength was concentrated in Philadelphia in the southeast, the Pittsburgh, and Johnstown areas in the southwest, and Scranton and Wilkes-Barre in the northeast. Republican strength was concentrated in the Philadelphia suburbs and the more rural areas in the state's central, northeastern, and western portions, some of which have long been considered among the nation's most conservative areas. Since 1992, however, the Philadelphia suburbs have swung Democratic; the brand of Republicanism there was traditionally moderate. In the 21st century, however, Pittsburgh suburbs, which historically had been Democratic strongholds, have swung more Republican.

Democratic political consultant James Carville once pejoratively described Pennsylvania as "Philadelphia in the east, Pittsburgh in the west, and Alabama in the middle", suggesting that political power in the state was based in its two largest cities, which have been reliably Democratic, offset by the state's large rural power base, which has proven equally reliably Republican. Political analysts and editorials refer to central Pennsylvania as the "T" in statewide elections. The state's three valleys (Delaware, Lehigh, and Wyoming valleys) and Greater Pittsburgh generally vote Democratic, while the majority of the counties in the central part of the state vote Republican. As a result, maps showing the results of statewide elections invariably form a shape that resembles a "T".

Pennsylvania retains the death penalty, although there is currently a gubernatorial hold on executions.

=== Federal representation ===
Pennsylvania's two U.S. senators are Republican Dave McCormick and Democrat John Fetterman.

Pennsylvania has 17 seats in the U.S. House of Representatives as of 2023.

== Education ==
Pennsylvania has 500 public school districts, thousands of private schools, publicly funded colleges and universities, and over 100 private institutions of higher education.

=== Primary and secondary education ===
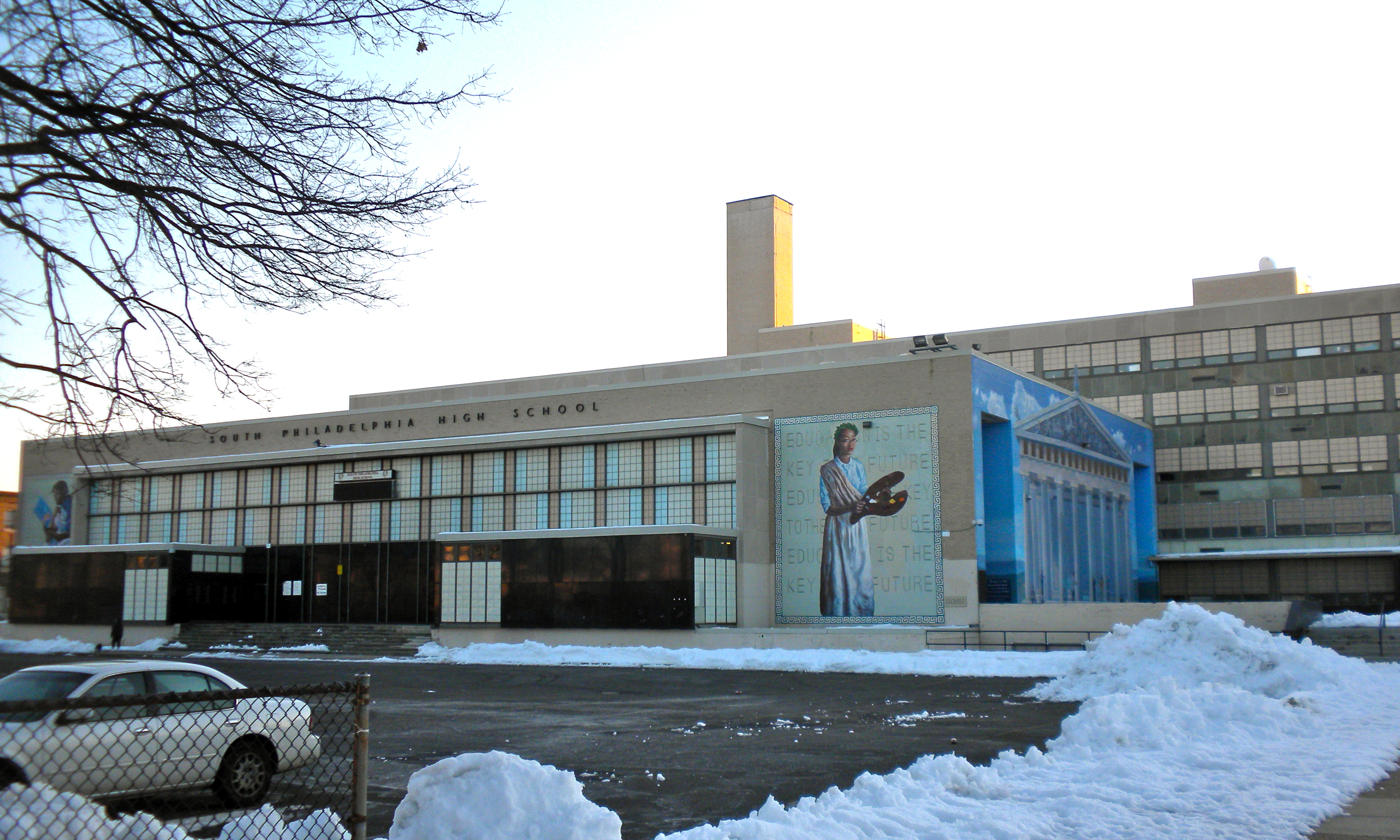
South Philadelphia High School on Broad Street in South Philadelphia in February 2010

Under state law, school attendance in Pennsylvania is mandatory for children between ages eight and 17, or until graduation from an accredited high school, whichever is earlier, unless students are homeschooled. As of 2005, 83.8% of Pennsylvania residents age 18 to 24 are high school graduates. Among residents age 25 and over, 86.7% have graduated from high school.

The following are the four-year graduation rates for students completing high school in 2016:

| Cohort | All Students | Male | Female | White | Hispanic | Black | Asian | Special Education |
|---|---|---|---|---|---|---|---|---|
| % graduating | 86.09 | 84.14 | 88.13 | 90.48 | 72.83 | 73.22 | 91.21 | 74.06 |

Among Pennsylvania high school graduates as of 2009, 27.5% of them went on to obtain a bachelor's degree or higher degree. State students consistently do well in standardized testing. In 2007, Pennsylvania ranked 14th in the nation in mathematics, 12th in reading, and 10th in writing for eighth grade students. In 1988, the Pennsylvania General Assembly passed Act 169, which allows parents or guardians to homeschool their children as an alternative to compulsory school attendance. The law specifies varying geographic requirements and responsibilities on the part of parents and school districts.

=== Higher education ===
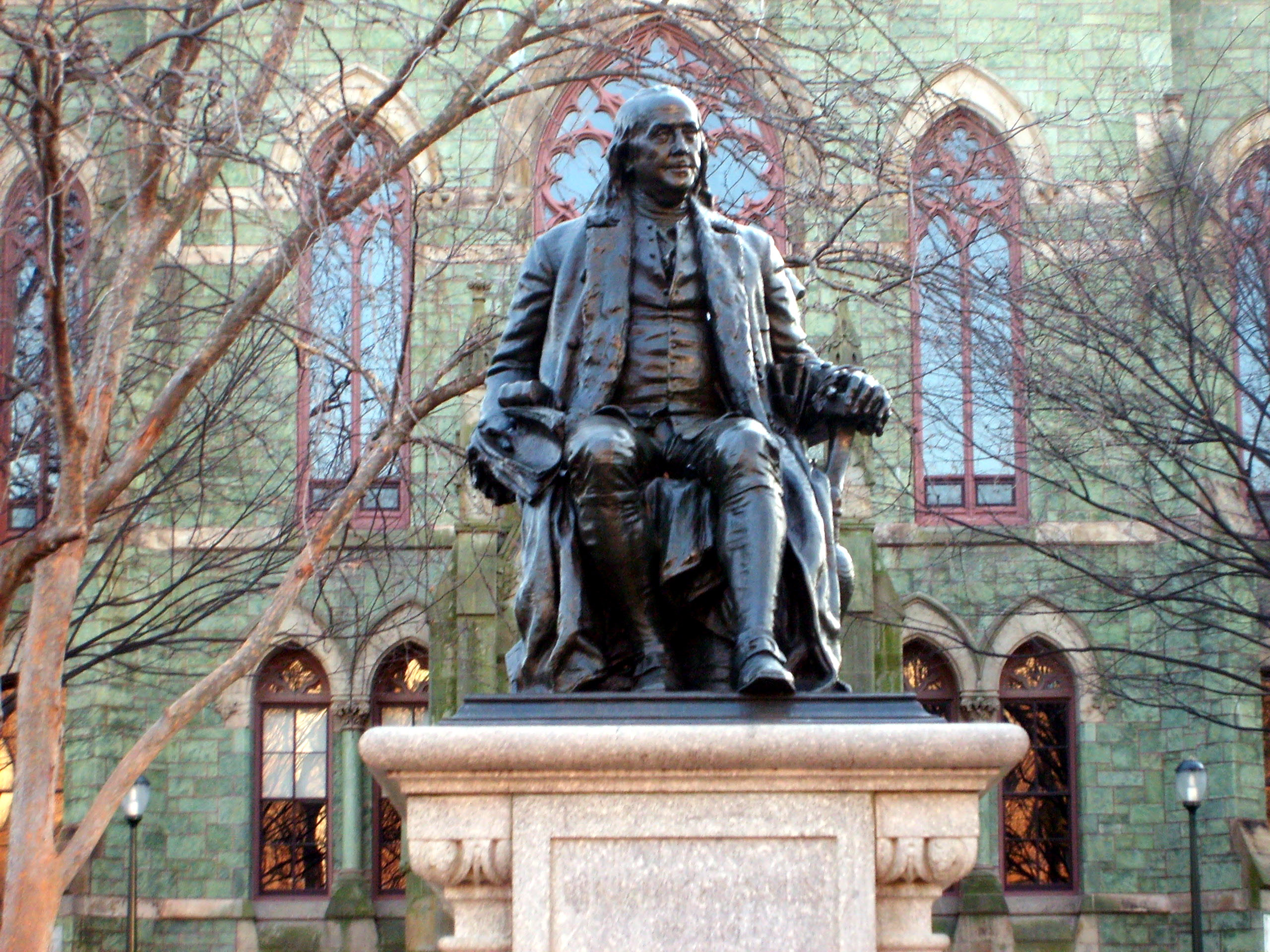
The Statue of Benjamin Franklin on the campus of the University of Pennsylvania in West Philadelphia, which pays tribute to Benjamin Franklin, a Founding Father who founded the university, now an Ivy League institution and one of the world's top universities, in 1740

"Pennsylvania has the fourth most higher education institutions of any state", according to Inside Higher Ed, with 250 universities and colleges. The state is ranked second among the nation's top destinations for freshman out-of-state college students, according to NPR/PBS affiliate WHYY, which cites a study by the Association of Independent Colleges and Universities of Pennsylvania (AICUP). Pennsylvania is third in the nation for the quantity of "Best Colleges", according to The Wall Street Journal.

The Pennsylvania State System of Higher Education (PASSHE), which includes 14 state-owned universities and colleges, is Pennsylvania's public university system. West Chester University is by far the largest of the 14 with nearly 15,000 students. The Commonwealth System of Higher Education is the organizing body of Pennsylvania's four state-related schools, which include Pennsylvania State University, Lincoln University, the University of Pittsburgh, and Temple University. There are 15 publicly funded two-year community colleges and technical schools in Pennsylvania that are separate from the PASSHE system, and many private two- and four-year technical schools, colleges, and universities.

Carnegie Mellon University, Pennsylvania State University, the University of Pennsylvania, and the University of Pittsburgh are members of the Association of American Universities, an invitation-only organization of leading research universities. Lehigh University, founded in 1865 and located in Bethlehem, is a private research university. The Pennsylvania State University is Pennsylvania's land-grant university, Sea Grant College, and Space Grant College.

The University of Pennsylvania, founded in West Philadelphia in 1740 by Benjamin Franklin, a Founding Father of the nation, is Pennsylvania's only Ivy League university, and is the geographically most southern of the nation's eight Ivy League universities. The University of Pennsylvania was one of the first universities established in the nation; its medical school, Perelman School of Medicine, founded in 1765, was the first medical school established in the nation.

The Lake Erie College of Osteopathic Medicine (LECOM) is a private graduate school of medicine, dentistry, and pharmacy with a main campus in Erie, a branch campus in Greensburg, and two additional campuses outside Pennsylvania. It is the largest medical school in the United States. The Pennsylvania Academy of the Fine Arts is the first and oldest art school in the United States. Philadelphia College of Pharmacy, now part of University of the Sciences in Philadelphia, was the first pharmacy school in the United States.

== Recreation ==
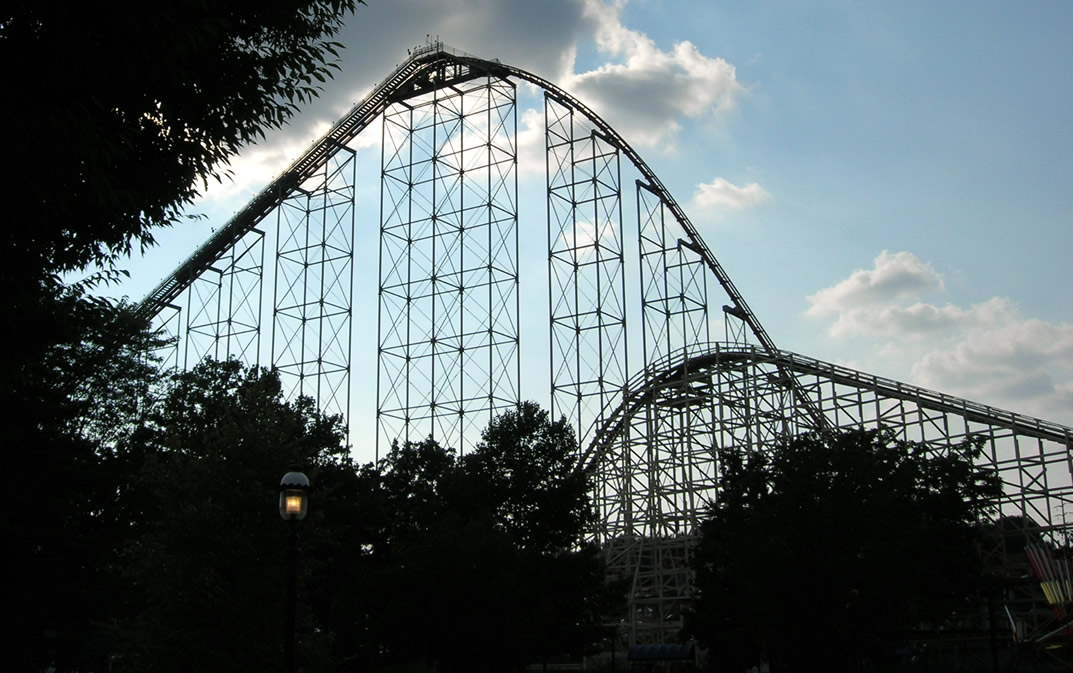
Dorney Park & Wildwater Kingdom's Steel Force and Thunderhawk roller coasters in Allentown; Steel Force is the eighth-longest steel roller coaster in the world with a first drop of 205 feet (62 m) and a top speed of 75 miles per hour (121 km/h).

Pennsylvania is home to the nation's first zoo, the Philadelphia Zoo. Other zoos also accredited by the Association of Zoos and Aquariums (AZA) are the Pittsburgh Zoo & PPG Aquarium, Lehigh Valley Zoo and ZooAmerica. Erie Zoo was formerly accredited by AZA, but lost its accreditation in 2021.

Pennsylvania is home to some of the most notable museums in the nation, including the Allentown Art Museum in Allentown, Carnegie Museums in Pittsburgh, the Philadelphia Museum of Art in Philadelphia, and several others. One unique museum is the Houdini Museum in Scranton, the only building in the world devoted to the legendary magician. Pennsylvania is also home to the National Aviary, located in Pittsburgh.

All 121 state parks in Pennsylvania feature free admission.

Pennsylvania's notable amusement parks include Conneaut Lake Park, Dorney Park & Wildwater Kingdom, Dutch Wonderland, DelGrosso's Park, Great Wolf Lodge, Hersheypark, Idlewild and Soak Zone, Kalahari Resorts Poconos, Kennywood, Knoebels, Lakemont Park, Sandcastle Waterpark, Sesame Place Philadelphia, and Waldameer & Water World. The largest indoor waterpark resort on the U.S. East Coast is Splash Lagoon in Erie.

The state's notable music festivals include Musikfest, the nation's largest free music festival held annually each August in Bethlehem, the Philadelphia Folk Festival, Creation Festival, and Purple Door. The Great Allentown Fair, held annually at the Allentown Fairgrounds since the 19th century, is one of the nation's longest-running annual fairs.

There are nearly one million licensed hunters in Pennsylvania. White-tail deer, black bear, cottontail rabbit, squirrel, turkey, and grouse are common game species. Pennsylvania is considered one of the finest wild turkey hunting states in the nation, alongside Texas and Alabama. Sport hunting in Pennsylvania provides a massive boost for the state's economy. A report from The Center for Rural Pennsylvania, a legislative agency of the Pennsylvania General Assembly, reported that hunting, fishing, and furtaking generated a total of $9.6 billion statewide.

The Boone and Crockett Club reports that five of the ten largest black bear entries came from the state. The state also has a tied record for the largest hunter shot black bear in the Boone and Crockett record books at 733 lb (332 kg) and a skull of 23 3/16, tied with a bear shot in California in 1993. As of 2007, Pennsylvania has the second-highest number of Boone and Crockett-recorded record black bears at 183, behind Wisconsin's 299.

== Transportation ==
The Pennsylvania Department of Transportation, abbreviated as PennDOT, is responsible for transport issues in Pennsylvania.

=== Air ===
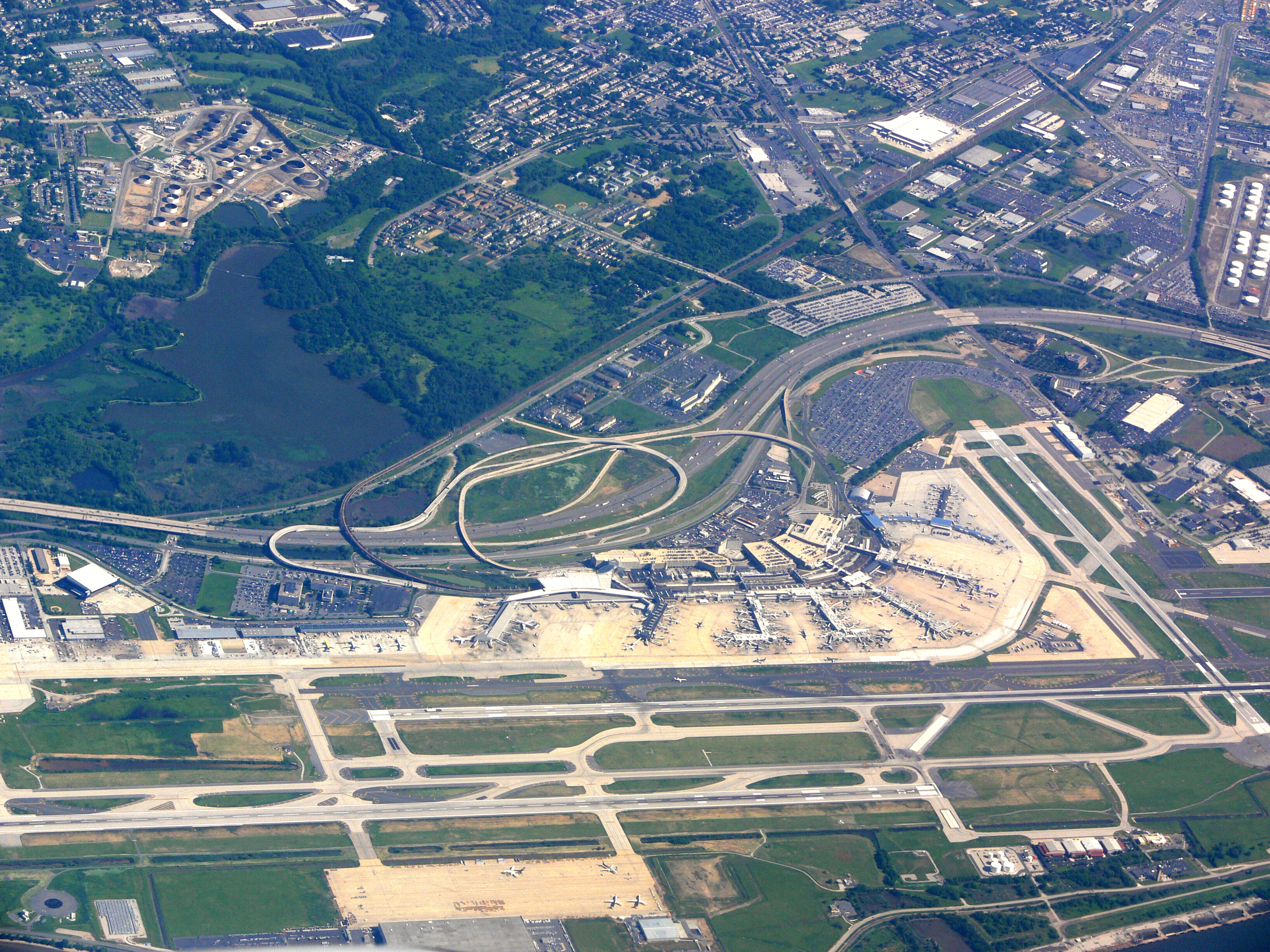
Philadelphia International Airport, the busiest airport in the state and the 21st-busiest airport in the nation with over 13 million passengers in 2023

Pennsylvania has seven major airports: Philadelphia International, Pittsburgh International, Lehigh Valley International, Harrisburg International, Wilkes-Barre/Scranton International, Erie International, and State College Regional. A total of 134 public-use airports are located in the state.

=== Bus and coach ===
Intercity bus service is provided between cities in Pennsylvania and other major points in the Northeast by BoltBus, Fullington Trailways, Greyhound Lines, Martz Trailways, Megabus, OurBus, Trans-Bridge Lines, and various Chinatown bus companies. In 2018, OurBus began offering service from West Chester, Malvern, King of Prussia, and Fort Washington to New York City.

=== Highways and roads ===
PennDOT owns 39,861 miles (64,150 km) of the 121,770 miles (195,970 km) of roadway in the state, making it the fifth-largest state highway system in the United States. The Pennsylvania Turnpike system is 535 miles (861 km) long, with the mainline portion stretching from Ohio to Philadelphia and New Jersey. It is overseen by the Pennsylvania Turnpike Commission. Another major east–west route is Interstate 80, which runs primarily in the northern tier of the state from Ohio to New Jersey at the Delaware Water Gap. Interstate 90 travels the relatively short distance between Ohio and New York through Erie County, in the extreme northwestern part of the state.

Primary north–south highways are Interstate 79 from its terminus in Erie through Pittsburgh to West Virginia, Interstate 81 from New York state through Scranton, Lackawanna County and Harrisburg to Maryland and Interstate 476, which begins 7 miles (11 km) north of the Delaware border, in Chester, Delaware County and travels 132 miles (212 km) to Clarks Summit, where it joins I-81. All but 20 miles (32 km) of I-476 is the Northeast Extension of the Pennsylvania Turnpike. The highway south of the Pennsylvania Turnpike is officially called the "Veterans Memorial Highway", but is commonly referred to colloquially as the "Blue Route".

=== Rail ===
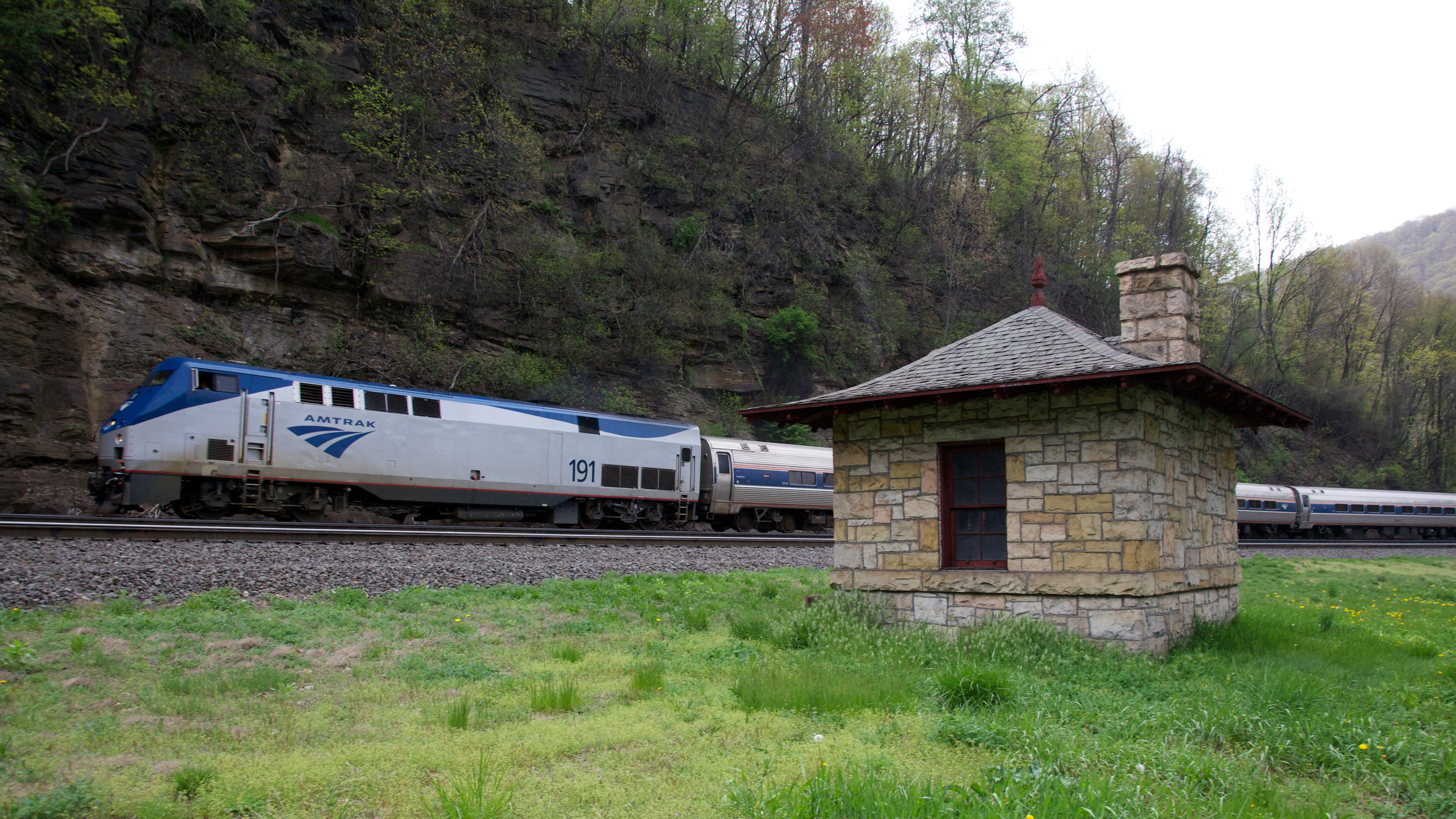
Amtrak's Pennsylvanian on Horseshoe Curve in Logan Township

SEPTA is the sixth-largest transit agency in the United States and operates the commuter, heavy and light rail transit, and transit bus service in the Philadelphia metropolitan area. Pittsburgh Regional Transit is the 25th-largest transit agency and provides transit bus and light rail service in and around Pittsburgh.

Intercity passenger rail transit is provided by Amtrak, with the majority of traffic occurring on the Keystone Service in the high-speed Keystone Corridor between Harrisburg and Philadelphia's 30th Street Station before heading north to New York City, and the Northeast Regional, which provides regular high-speed service up and down the Northeast Corridor. The Pennsylvanian follows the same route from New York City to Harrisburg, but extends out to Pittsburgh. The Capitol Limited also passes through Pittsburgh, as well as Connellsville, on its way from Chicago to Washington, D.C. Traveling between Chicago and New York City, the Lake Shore Limited passes through Erie once in each direction. There are 67 short-line, freight railroads operating in Pennsylvania, the highest number in any U.S. state. With more than four million inter-city rail passengers in 2018, Philadelphia's 30th Street Station is Amtrak's third-busiest train station in the nation after Penn Station in Manhattan and Union Station in Washington, D.C., and North America's 12th-busiest train station overall.

=== Water ===
The Port of Pittsburgh is the second-largest inland port in the United States and the 18th-largest port overall; the Port of Philadelphia is the 24th-largest port in the United States. Pennsylvania's only port on the Great Lakes is located in Erie. The Allegheny River Lock and Dam Two is the most-used lock operated by the United States Army Corps of Engineers of its 255 nationwide. The dam impounds the Allegheny River near Downtown Pittsburgh.

== Culture ==
=== Food ===
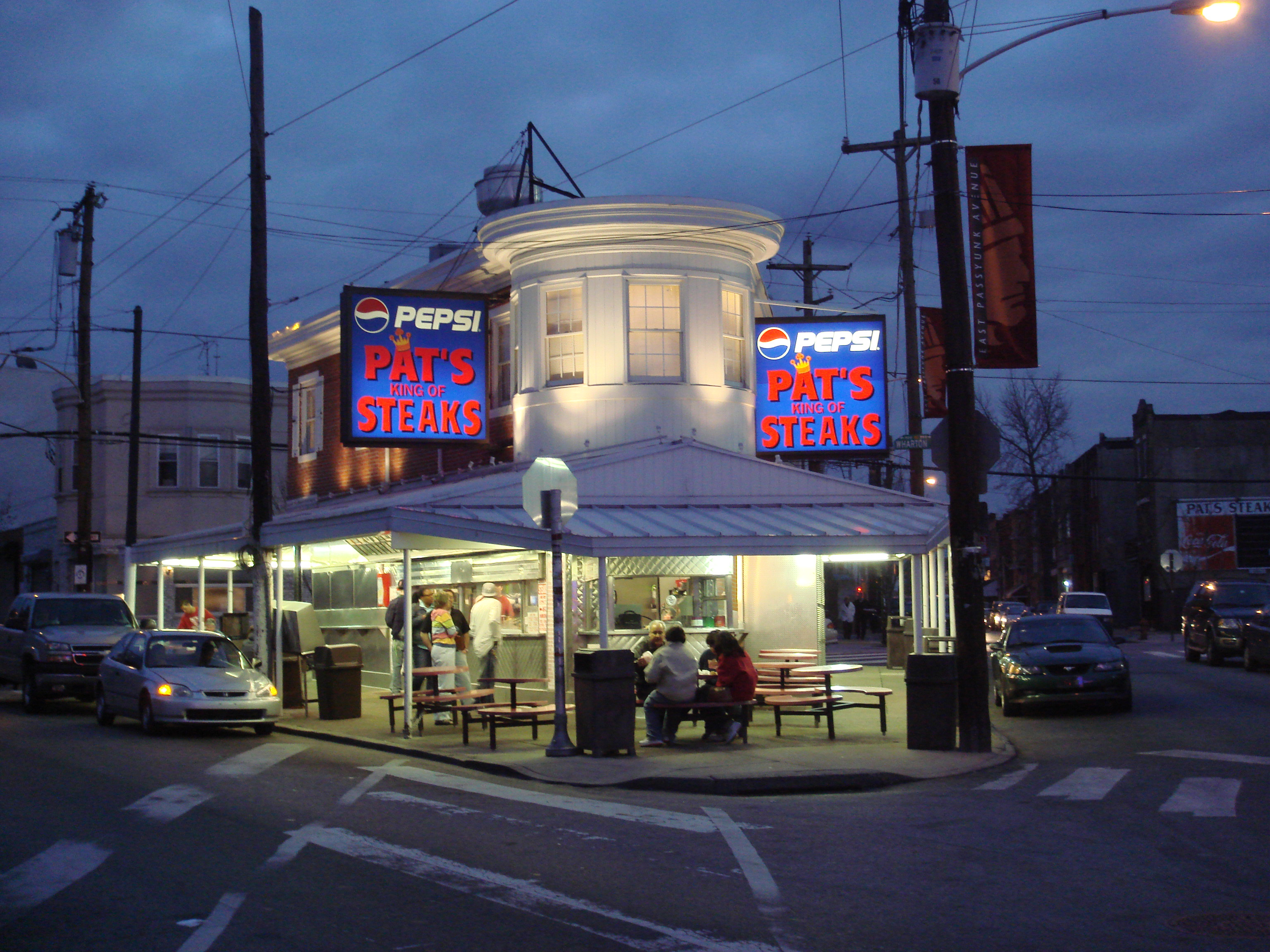
Pat's King of Steaks in South Philadelphia is widely credited with inventing the cheesesteak in 1933.

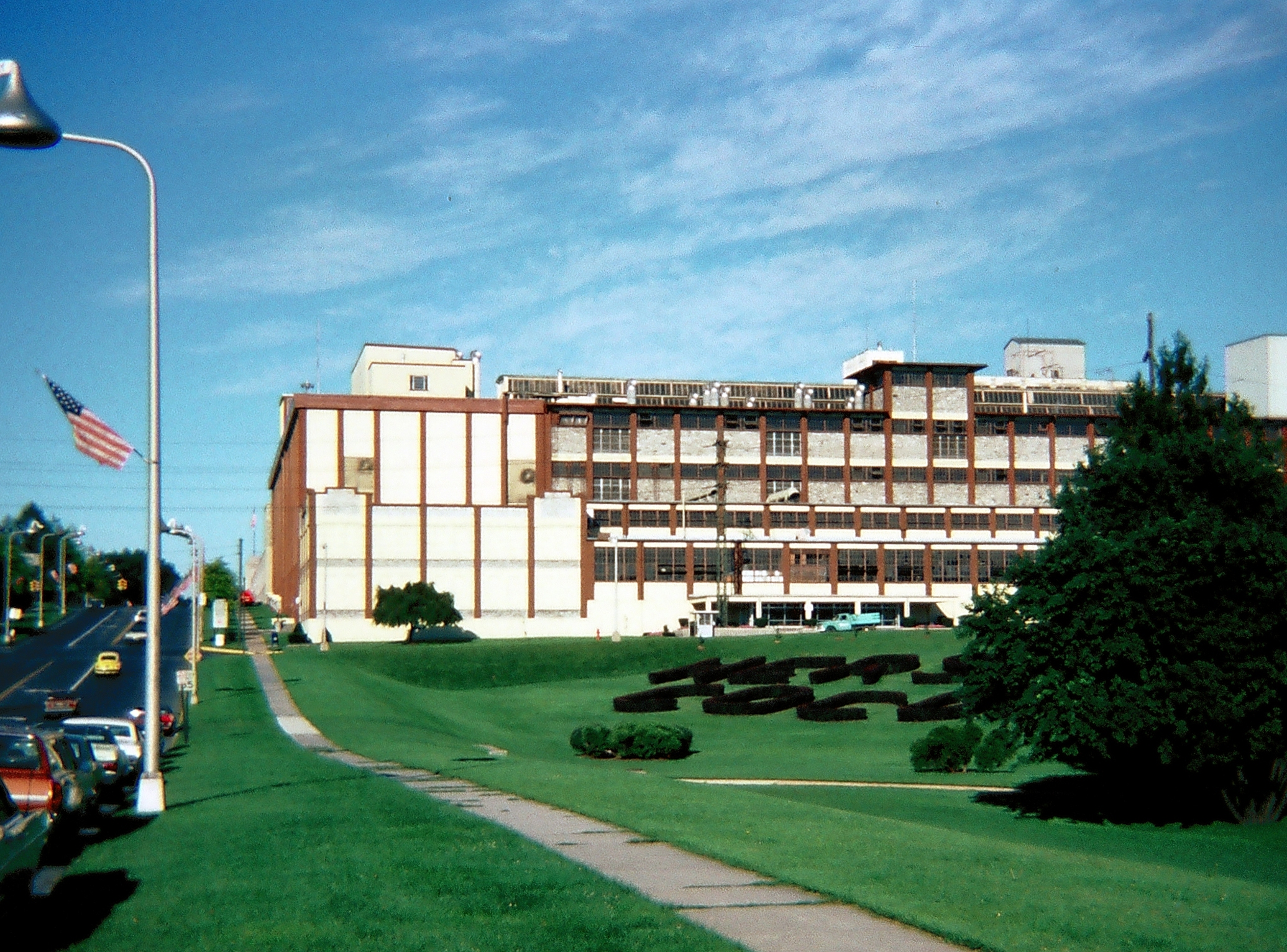
The Hershey Company in Hershey

In 2008, author Sharon Hernes Silverman wrote in the Pittsburgh Tribune-Review that Pennsylvania was the snack food capital of the world. It leads all other states in the manufacture of pretzels and potato chips. In 1861, as the Civil War was beginning, Sturgis Pretzel House in Lititz was first to introduce the pretzel to American consumers. Two other Pennsylvania-based companies, Immergut Hand-Rolled Soft Pretzels in Intercourse and Snyder's of Hanover in Hanover, are leading national pretzel manufacturers. Two of the nation's three leading potato chip companies are based in Pennsylvania: Utz Brands, which started making chips in Hanover in 1921, and Wise Foods, which started making chips in Berwick the same year; the third, Frito-Lay is owned by Plano, Texas-based PepsiCo. Additional Pennsylvania-based companies, including Herr's in Nottingham, Martin's Potato Chips in Thomasville, are popular chip manufacturers.

The Hershey Company in Hershey is a nearly $9 billion a year company and one of the world's leading manufacturers of chocolate; the company was founded in Hershey by Milton S. Hershey in 1894. Gertrude Hawk Chocolates is based in Dunmore. Other notable companies include Just Born in Bethlehem, makers of Hot Tamales, Mike and Ikes, the Easter favorite marshmallow Peeps, and Boyer Brothers of Altoona, which manufacturers Mallo Cups. The pretzel company Auntie Anne's began as a market-stand in Downingtown, and now has corporate headquarters in Lancaster. Traditional Pennsylvania Dutch foods include chicken pot pie, ham pot pie, schnitz un knepp (dried apples, ham, and dumplings), fasnachts (raised doughnuts), scrapple, pretzels, bologna, chow-chow, and Shoofly pie. Martin's Famous Pastry Shoppe, based in Chambersburg, Pennsylvania, specializes in potato bread, another traditional Pennsylvania Dutch food. D.G. Yuengling & Son, America's oldest brewery, has been brewing beer in Pottsville since 1829.

Among the regional foods associated with Philadelphia are cheesesteaks, hoagies, soft pretzels, Italian water ice, Irish potato candy, scrapple, Tastykake, and strombolis. In Pittsburgh, tomato ketchup was improved by Henry John Heinz from 1876 to the early 20th century. Famous to a lesser extent than Heinz ketchup is the Pittsburgh's Primanti Brothers Restaurant sandwiches, pierogies, and city chicken. In northeastern Pennsylvania, Italian heritage has popularized a variety of pizza styles. Outside of Scranton, in Old Forge, there are dozens of Italian restaurants specializing in pizza made with thick, light crust, and American cheese. New York–style pizza is popular in Wilkes-Barre. Erie also has its share of foods, including Greek sauce and sponge candy. Sauerkraut along with pork and mashed potatoes is a traditional meal on New Year's Day in Pennsylvania; its tradition began with the Pennsylvania Dutch who believe the meal leads to good luck in the new year to come. Among other foods and drinks commonly found in Pennsylvania Dutch Country are chicken pot pie (a type of soup made with egg noodles and unrelated to the more commonly found baked pie), shoofly pie, scrapple, sand tarts (a type of thin cookie), and birch beer. Whoopie pies, an American favorite, are also said to trace their roots back to Pennsylvania Dutch Country.

=== Sports ===
==== Professional sports ====
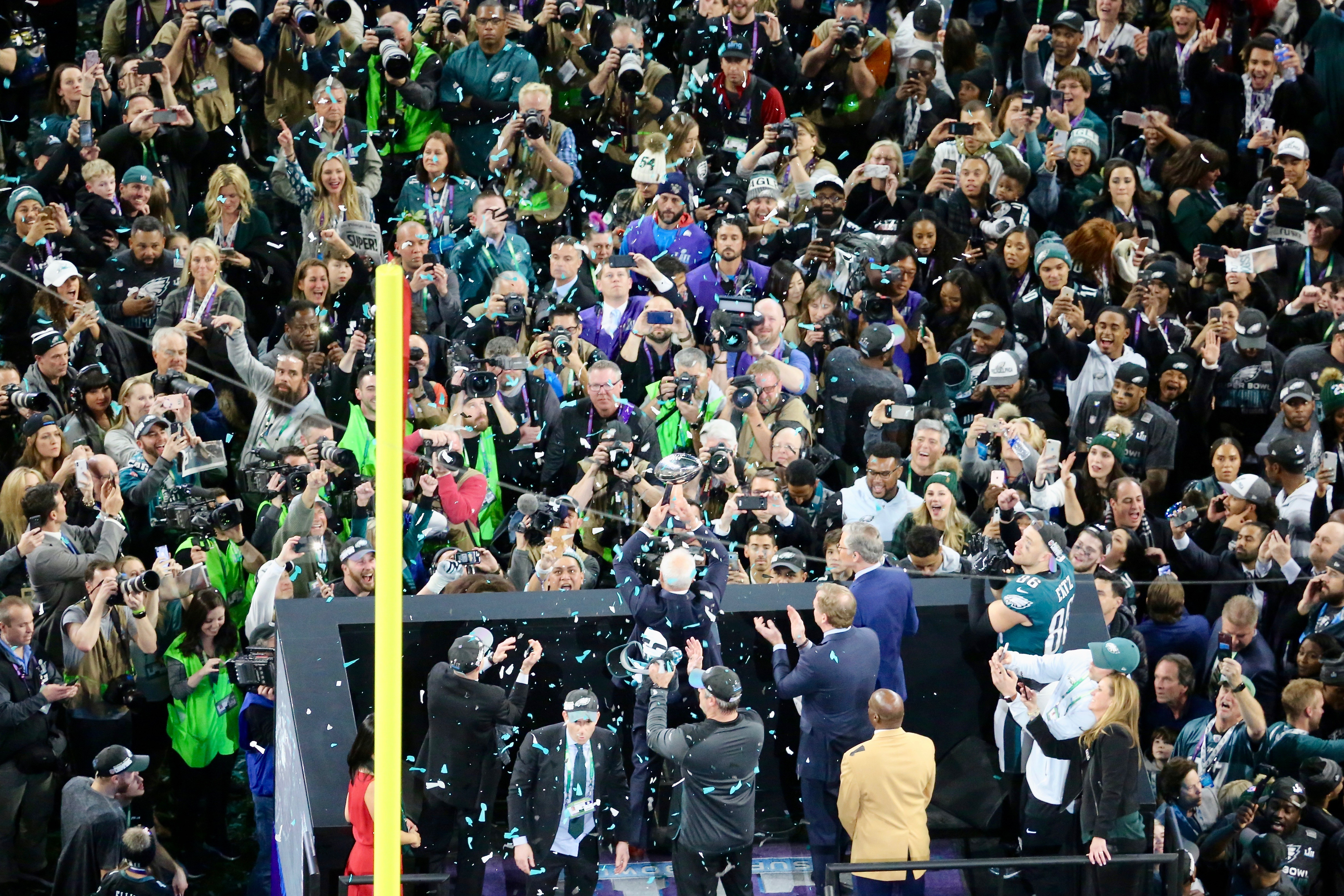
The Philadelphia Eagles are presented with the Vince Lombardi Trophy on February 4, 2018, after winning Super Bowl LII, in which they defeated the New England Patriots 41–33.

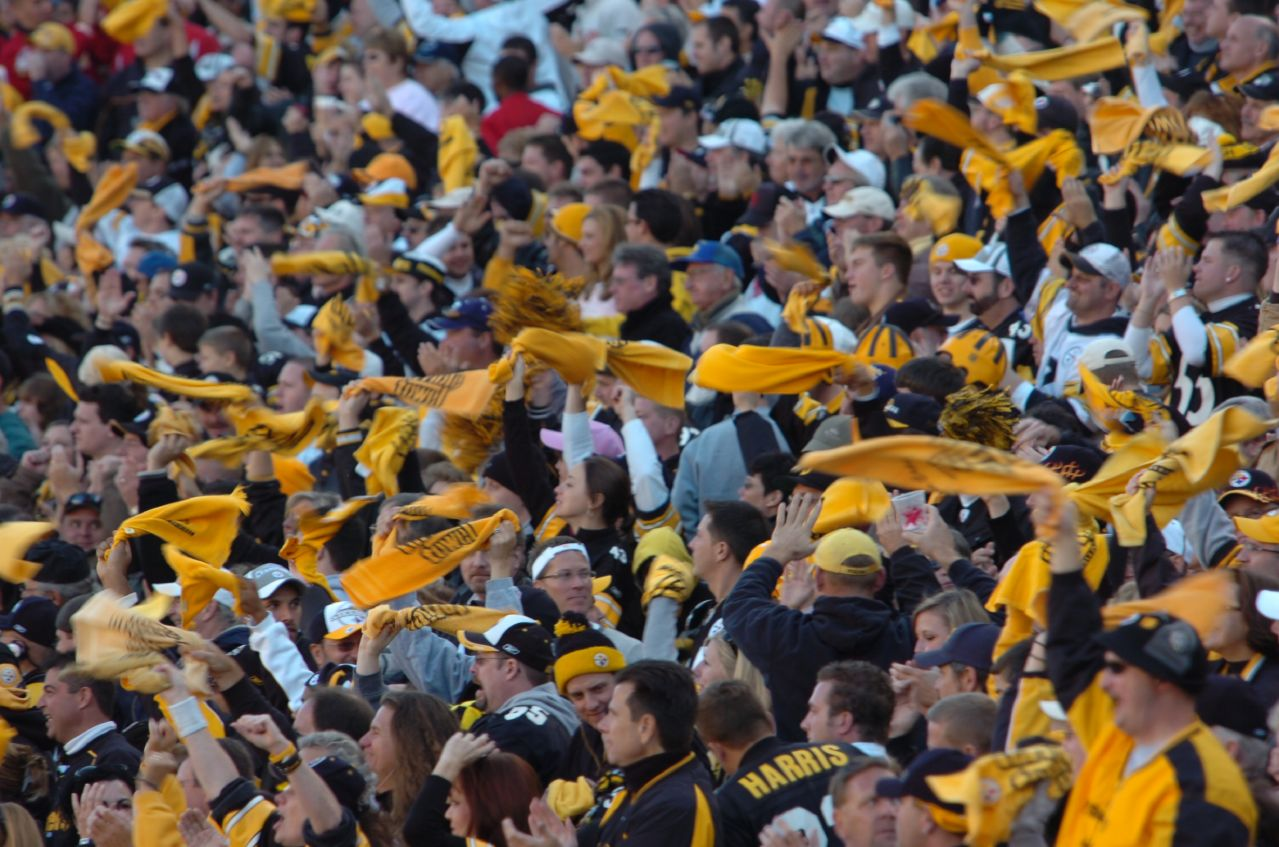
Pittsburgh Steelers' fans waving the Terrible Towel, a tradition that dates back to 1975

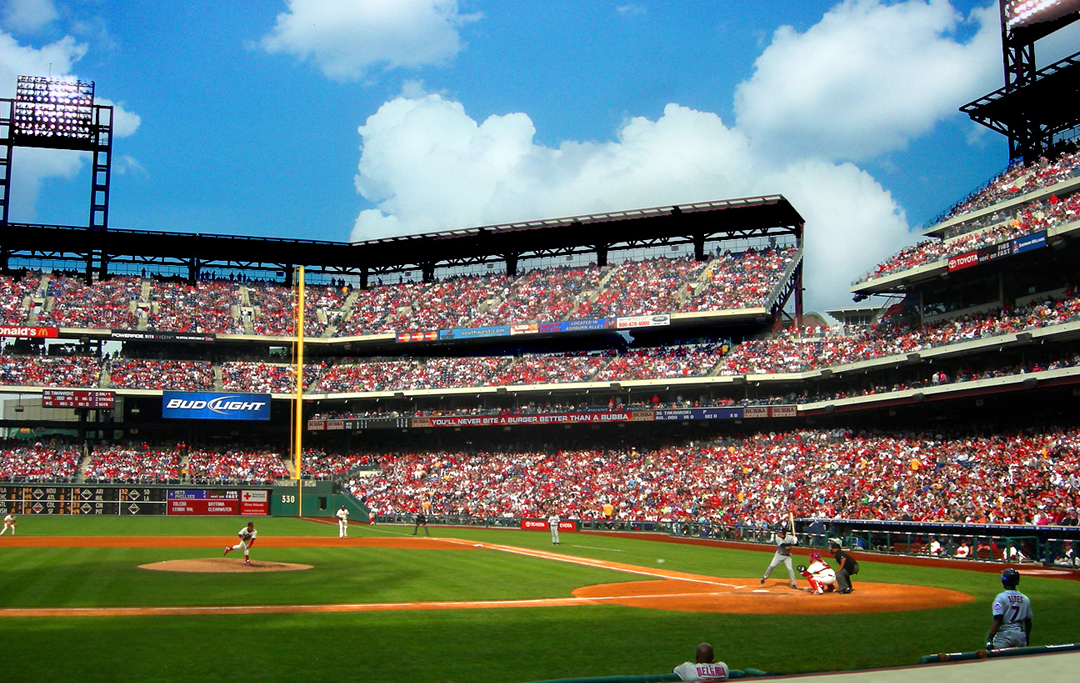
Citizens Bank Park in South Philadelphia, home of the Philadelphia Phillies, the oldest continuous same-name, same-city franchise in American professional sports

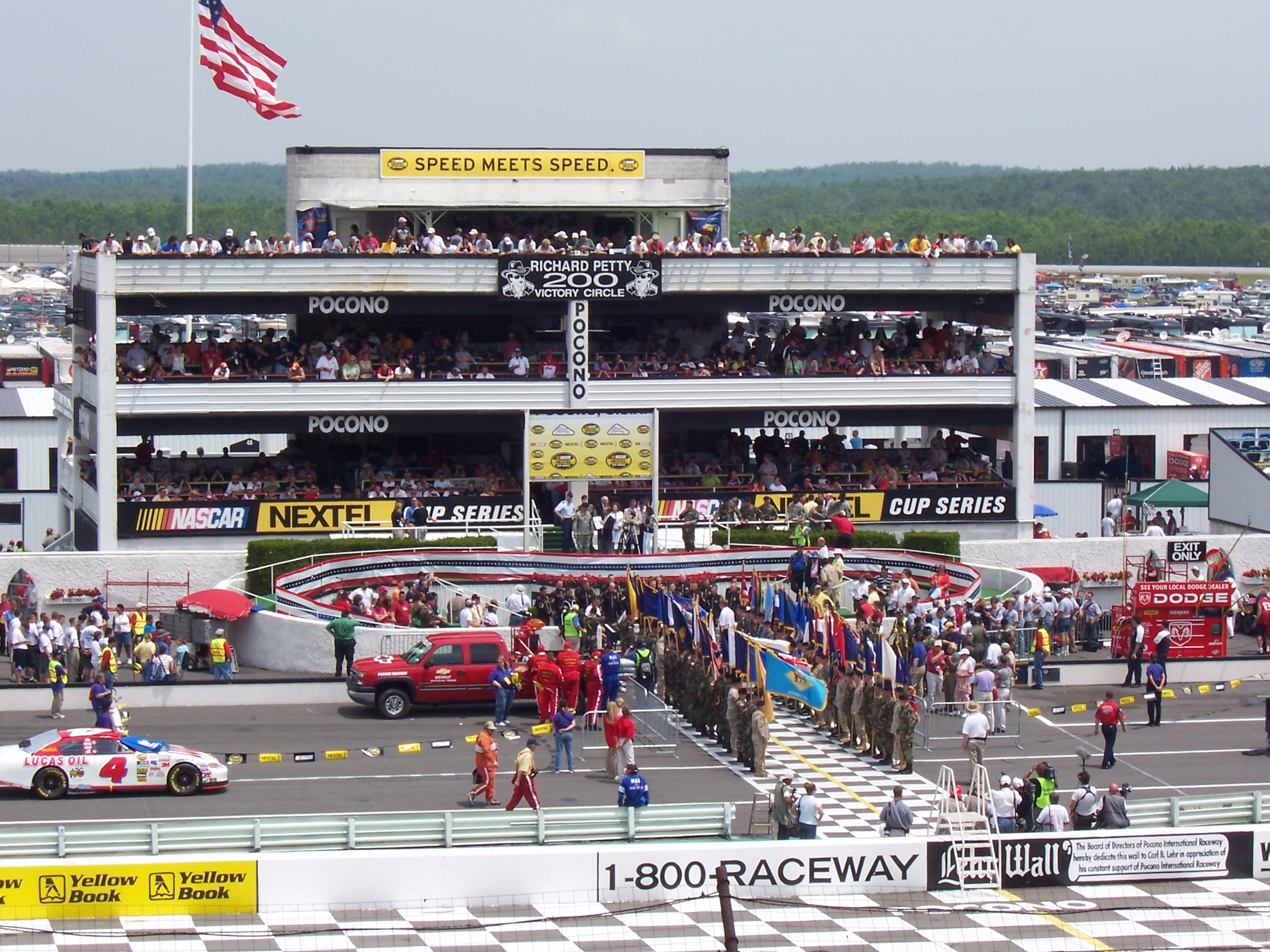
NASCAR racing at Pocono Raceway in Long Pond

Pennsylvania is home to eight major league professional sports teams: the Philadelphia Phillies and Pittsburgh Pirates of Major League Baseball, the Philadelphia 76ers of the NBA, the Philadelphia Eagles and Pittsburgh Steelers of the NFL, the Philadelphia Flyers and Pittsburgh Penguins of the NHL, and the Philadelphia Union of Major League Soccer. Among them, these teams have accumulated seven World Series championships (with the Pirates winning five and Phillies winning two), 16 National League pennants (with the Pirates winning nine and Phillies winning seven), three pre-Super Bowl era NFL championships (all won by the Eagles), eight Super Bowl championships (with the Steelers winning six and the Eagles two), two NBA championships (both won by the 76ers), and seven Stanley Cup championships (with the Penguins winning five and Flyers winning two).

With five professional sports teams and some of the most passionate sports fans in the nation, Philadelphia is often described as the "nation's best sports city".

In addition to its two Major League Baseball franchises, Pennsylvania is home to two Triple-A-level teams, the highest level of Minor League Baseball play. The Lehigh Valley IronPigs, affiliated with the Philadelphia Phillies, are based in Allentown, where they play at Coca-Cola Park. The Scranton/Wilkes-Barre Highlanders, affiliated with the New York Yankees, are based in Moosic, where they play at PNC Field.

Pennsylvania is home to four Double-A level baseball teams: the Altoona Curve, Erie SeaWolves, Harrisburg Senators, and Reading Fightin Phils. Pennsylvania has two collegiate summer baseball teams affiliated with the MLB Draft League: the State College Spikes and Williamsport Crosscutters. In independent baseball, the state has three teams, the Lancaster Stormers, Washington Wild Things, and York Revolution.

In addition to its two National Hockey League teams, Pennsylvania has three American Hockey League ice hockey teams: the Hershey Bears affiliated with the Washington Capitals, the Lehigh Valley Phantoms affiliated with the Philadelphia Flyers, and the Wilkes-Barre/Scranton Penguins affiliated with the Pittsburgh Penguins. It also has an ECHL-level ice hockey team, the Reading Royals, and an Arena Football League team, the Philadelphia Soul. These Pennsylvania-based developmental-level professional teams have accumulated 12 Triple-A and Double-A baseball league titles (Altoona Curve (1) Reading Fightin Phils (4), and Scranton/Wilkes-Barre Senators (6)), 3 ArenaBowl championships (Soul), and 11 Calder Cups (Bears).

In addition to the Philadelphia Union of Major League Soccer, Pennsylvania has two lower level professional soccer teams: Philadelphia Union II of MLS Next Pro and the Pittsburgh Riverhounds SC of the USL Championship.

Since 1959, the Little League World Series has been held annually in August in South Williamsport near where Little League Baseball was founded in Williamsport.

In professional golf, Arnold Palmer, one of the 20th century's most accomplished professional golfers, comes from Latrobe, and Jim Furyk, a current PGA player grew up near in Lancaster. PGA tournaments in Pennsylvania include the 84 Lumber Classic played at Nemacolin Woodlands Resort in Farmington and the Northeast Pennsylvania Classic played at Glenmaura National Golf Club in Moosic.

Philadelphia is home to Love Park, located across from City Hall, which is a popular skateboard location that hosted ESPN's X Games in 2001 and 2002.

==== Motorsports ====
In motorsports, the Mario Andretti dynasty of race drivers hails from Nazareth in the Lehigh Valley. Pennsylvania racetracks include Jennerstown Speedway in Jennerstown, Lake Erie Speedway in North East, Lernerville Speedway in Sarver, and Pocono Raceway in Long Pond, which is home to two NASCAR Cup Series races and an IndyCar Series race. The state is also home to Maple Grove Raceway, near Reading, which hosts major National Hot Rod Association-sanctioned drag racing events each year.

There are also two motocross race tracks that host a round of the AMA Toyota Motocross Championships in Pennsylvania. High Point Raceway is located in Mount Morris, Pennsylvania, and Steel City is located in Delmont, Pennsylvania.

Horse racing tracks in Pennsylvania include The Meadows in North Strabane Township, Mohegan Pennsylvania in Wilkes-Barre, Penn National in Grantville, Presque Isle Downs in Summit Township, and Parx Racing, Harrah's Philadelphia in Chester, which was the home course of Smarty Jones, winner of the 2004 Kentucky Derby and 2004 Preakness Stakes. Harrah's Philadelphia also hosts harness racing and Presque Isle Downs also hosts thoroughbred racing.

==== College sports ====
In college football, three Pennsylvania universities compete in NCAA Division I, the highest level of sanctioned collegiate play in the sport: Penn State in the Big Ten Conference, Pitt in the Atlantic Coast Conference, and Temple in the American Athletic Conference.

Over their respective college football histories, Penn State claims two national championships (1982 and 1986) and seven undefeated seasons (1887, 1912, 1968, 1969, 1973, 1986, and 1994) and Pitt has won nine national championships (1915, 1916, 1918, 1929, 1931, 1934, 1936, 1937, and 1976) and had eight undefeated seasons (1904, 1910, 1915, 1916, 1917, 1920, 1937, and 1976). Penn State plays its home games at Beaver Stadium, a 106,572-capacity stadium that is the second-largest stadium in the nation; the team is coached by James Franklin. Pitt plays its home games at Acrisure Stadium, a 68,400-capacity stadium it shares with the Pittsburgh Steelers; the team is coached by Pat Narduzzi. Over their respective histories, four additional Pennsylvania universities and colleges have won national college football championships: Lafayette in Easton (1896), Villanova in Villanova (2009), Penn in Philadelphia (1895, 1897, 1904, and 1908), and Washington & Jefferson in Washington (1921).

In college basketball, six Philadelphia-area universities (Drexel, La Salle, Penn, St. Joseph's, Temple, and Villanova), collectively known as the Big 5, have a rivalry tradition. National titles in college basketball have been won by La Salle (1954), Temple (1938), Penn (1920 and 1921), Pitt (1928 and 1930), and Villanova (1985, 2016, and 2018).

Pennsylvania has several universities and colleges known as national leaders in college wrestling. Penn State, coached by Cael Sanderson, has won ten NCAA Division I Wrestling Championships in its history, second most among all universities and colleges after Oklahoma State. Lehigh in Bethlehem has had 28 NCAA Division I individual champions over its history.

== Nicknames ==
Since 1802, Pennsylvania has been known as the Keystone State, which remains the state's most popular and widely used nickname. The nickname "Keystone State" originates with the agricultural and architectural term "keystone", and is based on the central role that Pennsylvania played geographically and functionally among the original Thirteen Colonies from which the nation was established, the important founding documents, including the Declaration of Independence and U.S. Constitution, that were signed and ratified in Pennsylvania, and the central role that Pennsylvania played in the nation's early manufacturing and agricultural development.

Less often, Pennsylvania is referred to as the Coal State, the Oil State, and the Steel State, in recognition of the important role these respective industries played in the state in the 19th and 20th centuries. The State of Independence appears on several current day road signs entering Pennsylvania from bordering states.

Pennsylvania residents and those of surrounding states sometimes refer to Pennsylvania by the state's abbreviation, PA.

Pennsylvania was historically referred to by the nickname Quaker State during the colonial era based on the influential role that William Penn and other Quakers played in establishing the first frame of government constitution for the Province of Pennsylvania that guaranteed liberty of conscience, which was a reflection of Penn's knowledge of the hostility Quakers confronted when they opposed religious rituals, taking oaths, violence, war, and military service, and what they viewed as ostentatious frippery. In the 21st century, Pennsylvania has garnered the additional nickname of "Cellicon State" for the central role of Philadelphia and Pittsburgh in the development of immunotherapies to treat different cancers.

== Sister regions ==
- Fujian, China
- Matanzas Province, Cuba
- Rhône-Alpes, France

== See also ==
- Index of Pennsylvania-related articles
- Outline of Pennsylvania

== Notes ==
| Preceded by Delaware | List of U.S. states by date of admission to the Union; Ratified Constitution on December 12, 1787 (2nd) | Succeeded by New Jersey |
