= EYC =

EYC may refer to:

== Government and politics ==
- Education, Youth, Culture and Sport Council of the Council of the European Union
- European Young Conservatives
- European Youth Campaign, a defunct operation of the United States Central Intelligence Agency
- European Youth Centres, residential centres set up by the Youth Department of the Council of Europe

== Yacht clubs ==
- Edgartown Yacht Club, in Massachusetts
- Edgewood Yacht Club, in Rhode Island
- Erie Yacht Club, in Pennsylvania
- Eugene Yacht Club, in Oregon

== Other uses ==
- E.Y.C. (band), an American pop/R&B group
- East Yorkshire Carnegie F.C., an English football club
- Ecology Youth Corps, an American environmental organization
- Edinburgh Youth Choir, in Scotland
- Episcopal Youth Community of the Episcopal Church in the United States of America
- European Youth Capital
