= Keystone symbol =

De-facto state emblem of Pennsylvania

Keystone Symbol
- Design of the keystone symbol on the Pennsylvania government's website
- Armiger: Commonwealth of Pennsylvania
- Earliest mention: c. 1890
- Shield: two isosceles trapezoids
- Use: ID cards, road signs, logos of government agencies

The keystone symbol is the name commonly given to the de-facto state emblem of Pennsylvania. It is a stylized keystone (or capstone), an architectural term for a wedge-shaped stone placed at the top of an arch. The shape consists of two isosceles trapezoids, each with the smaller side facing downward, with one being smaller, more flat, and placed on top of the other. The symbol alludes to Pennsylvania's official nickname, The Keystone State. Although the symbol has not been designated as the official state emblem, the Pennsylvania Department of Community and Economic Development has declared it the "official Pennsylvania government logo". It is also popular for non-governmental purposes.

The symbol appears on Pennsylvania state route markers, Pennsylvania ID cards, and the logo of each cabinet-level agency of the Pennsylvania government. It is also used in various non-governmental logos, such as that of the Pennsylvania Railroad, Heinz, Little League Baseball, and the National Honor Society.

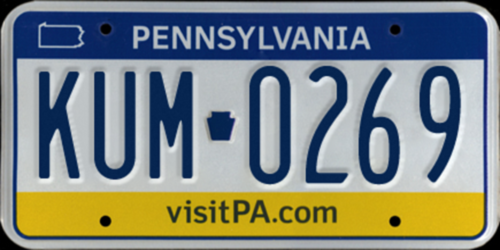
Use as a bullet point on modern Pennsylvanian license plates

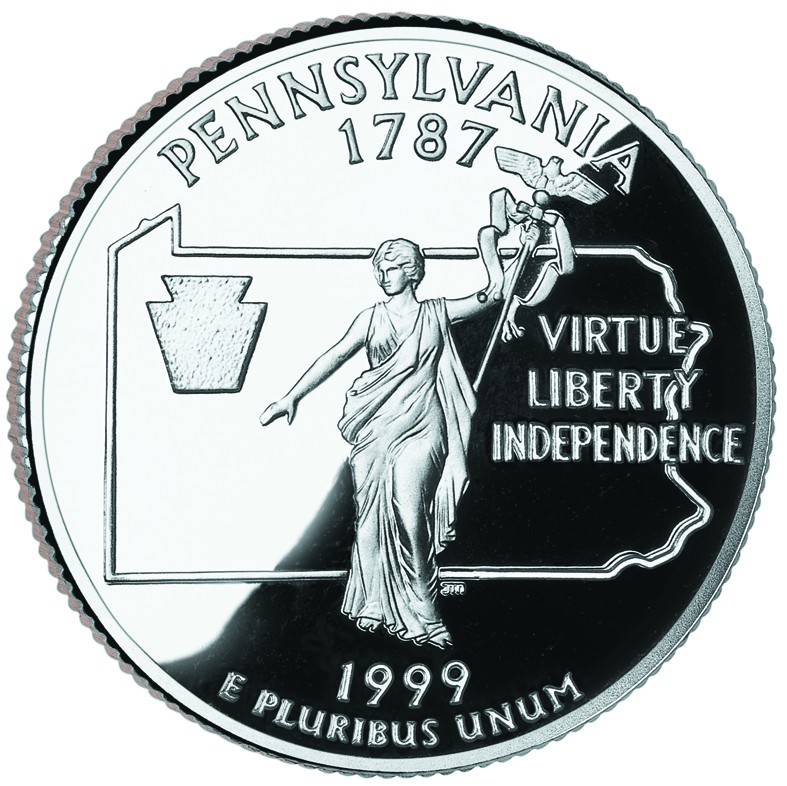
Use on state quarter

Use on official state route markers

Keystone symbols are extremely common in military heraldry. It can be found on the badge of the Pennsylvania Army National Guard, the Pennsylvania Air National Guard, and the now-disbanded Pennsylvania State Guard. Many parts of the Pennsylvanian and United States national army also include keystone symbols on their insignia.

The flag of Shenango Township (in Lawrence County, Pennsylvania) has a keystone symbol on it. The shield is shaped like a keystone symbol on the de-facto coat of arms of the city of Allentown, Pennsylvania, which is placed on the city's official flag and seal. The seal of Keystone Heights, Florida also has a keystone symbol on it.

The Keystone flag, a popular proposal for a redesign of the state flag

In 2017 the "Keystone Flag" was designed by Tara Stark. The flag incorporates the keystone into a tricolor design using the colors on the coat of arms of Pennsylvania as an intentional callback to the symbolism of the existing flag. The design gained significant attention on social media, but is not currently adopted.

The bookplate of the University of Pennsylvania is in the shape of a keystone symbol. (Note: See the file File:University of Pennsylvania bookplate.png) The shield of the coat of arms of the Keystone Central School District is shaped like a keystone symbol.

The seal and burgee of the Erie Yacht Club in Erie, Pennsylvania both have keystone symbols on them.

== History ==
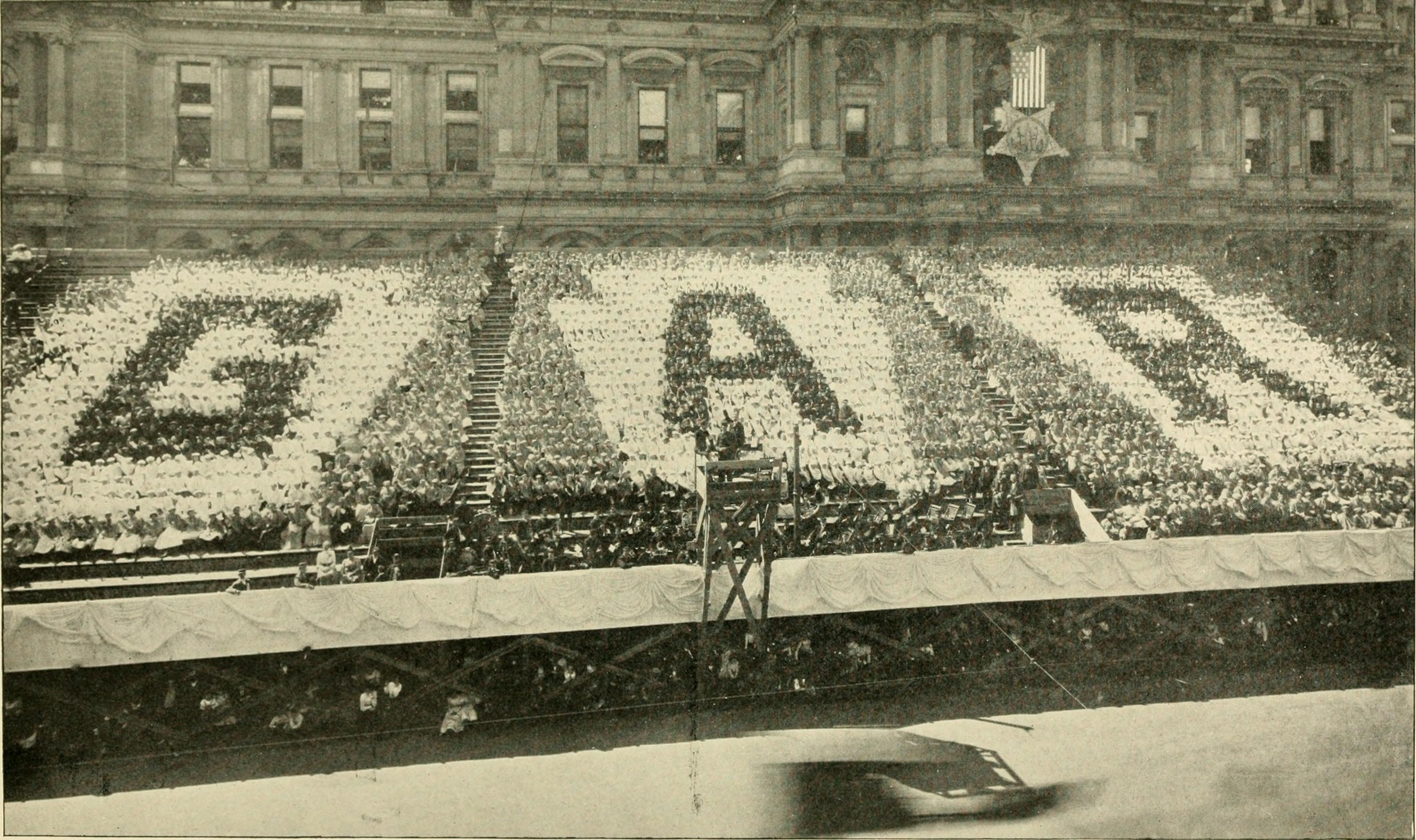
Keystone symbols displayed at a military parade in 1899 (the symbols are described as being white, on a blue field, with red letters)

In September 1899, a military parade in Philadelphia featured a choir of 3,200 school-children and teachers that were arranged to display three keystone symbols with the letters "GAR" on them (standing for Grand Army of the Republic). By the 1910s, the symbol was somewhat popular, and was used often enough that the average person could recognize it.

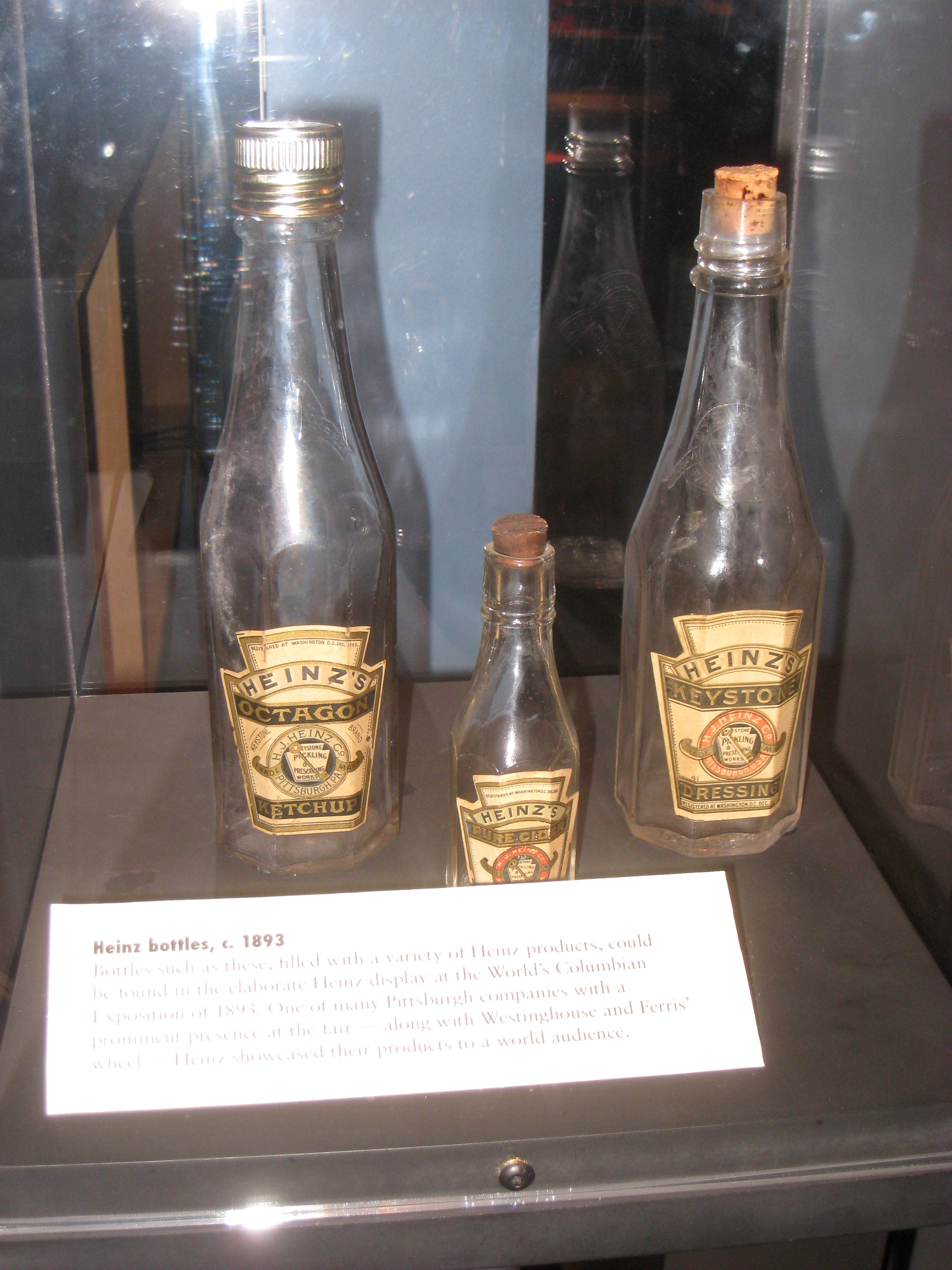
Heinz bottle c. 1893

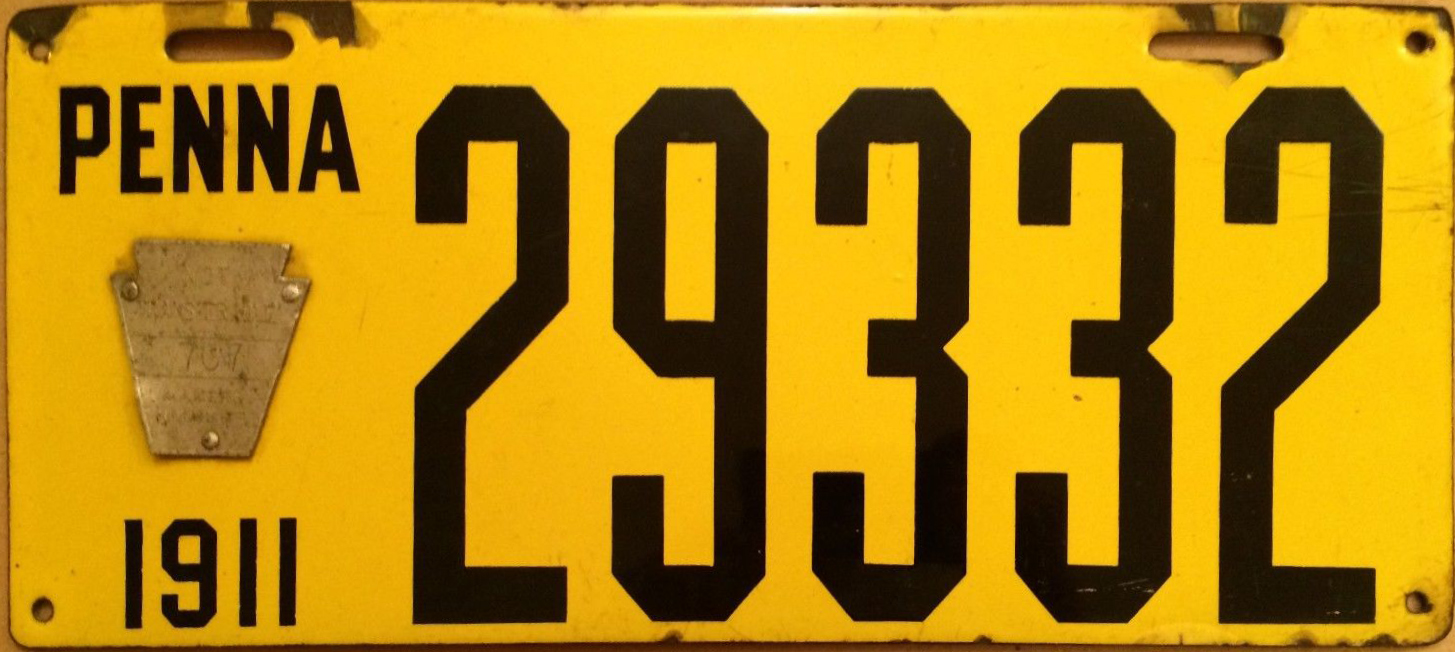
1911 Pennsylvanian license plate

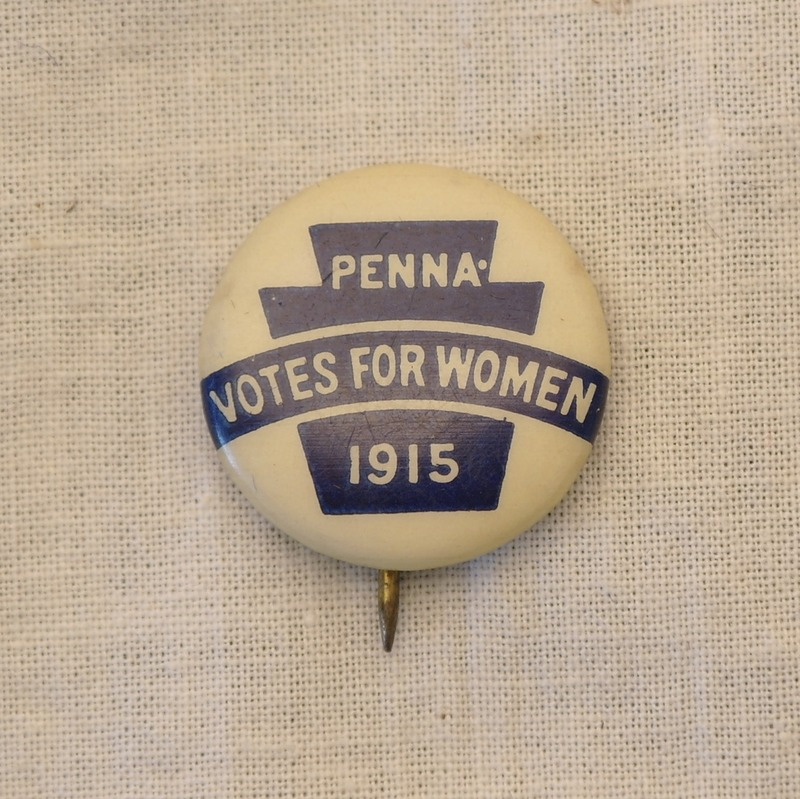
1915 Women's suffrage clothing pin featuring a keystone symbol

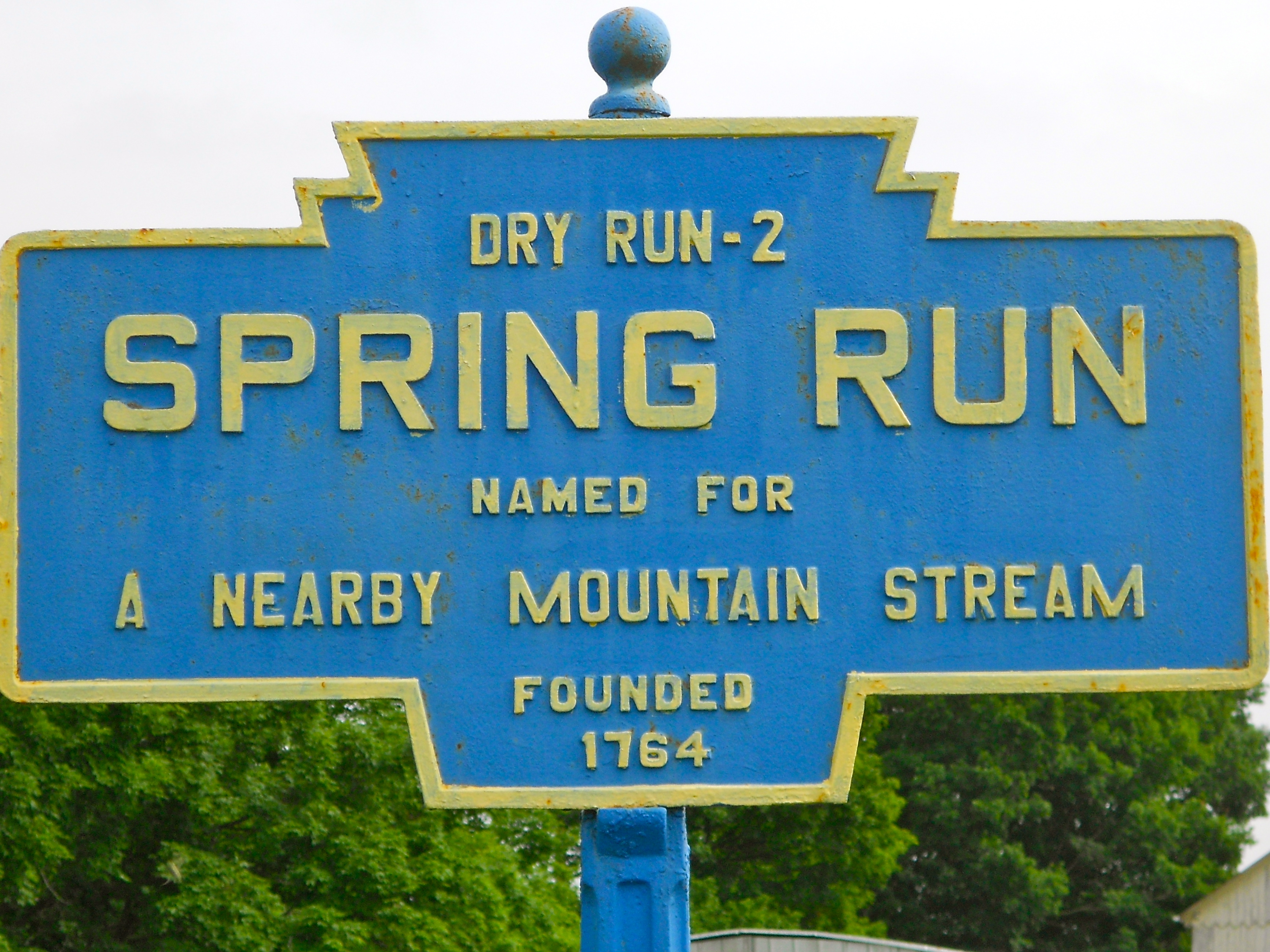
Keystone Marker for the city of Spring Run

Shortly after World War I, the Department of Highways (now part of PennDOT) created a system of road signs called Keystone Markers. These signs were in the shape of the keystone symbol, and were usually blue with a yellow border but could vary due to cultural reasons. These signs used to number in the thousands, but as of 2010, only around 600 exist state-wide. Today, "keystone marker" can informally refer to the modern state route markers.

== See also ==
- List of Pennsylvania state symbols
- Flag of Pennsylvania
- Coat of arms of Pennsylvania
- Seal of Pennsylvania
