= Flag of Pennsylvania =

U.S. state flag

Commonwealth of Pennsylvania
- Use: Civil and state flag
- Proportion: 27:37
- Adopted: June 13, 1907; 119 years ago
- Design: A state coat of arms on a blue field

The flag of the U.S. state of Pennsylvania consists of a blue field on which the state coat of arms is displayed.

== Design specifications ==
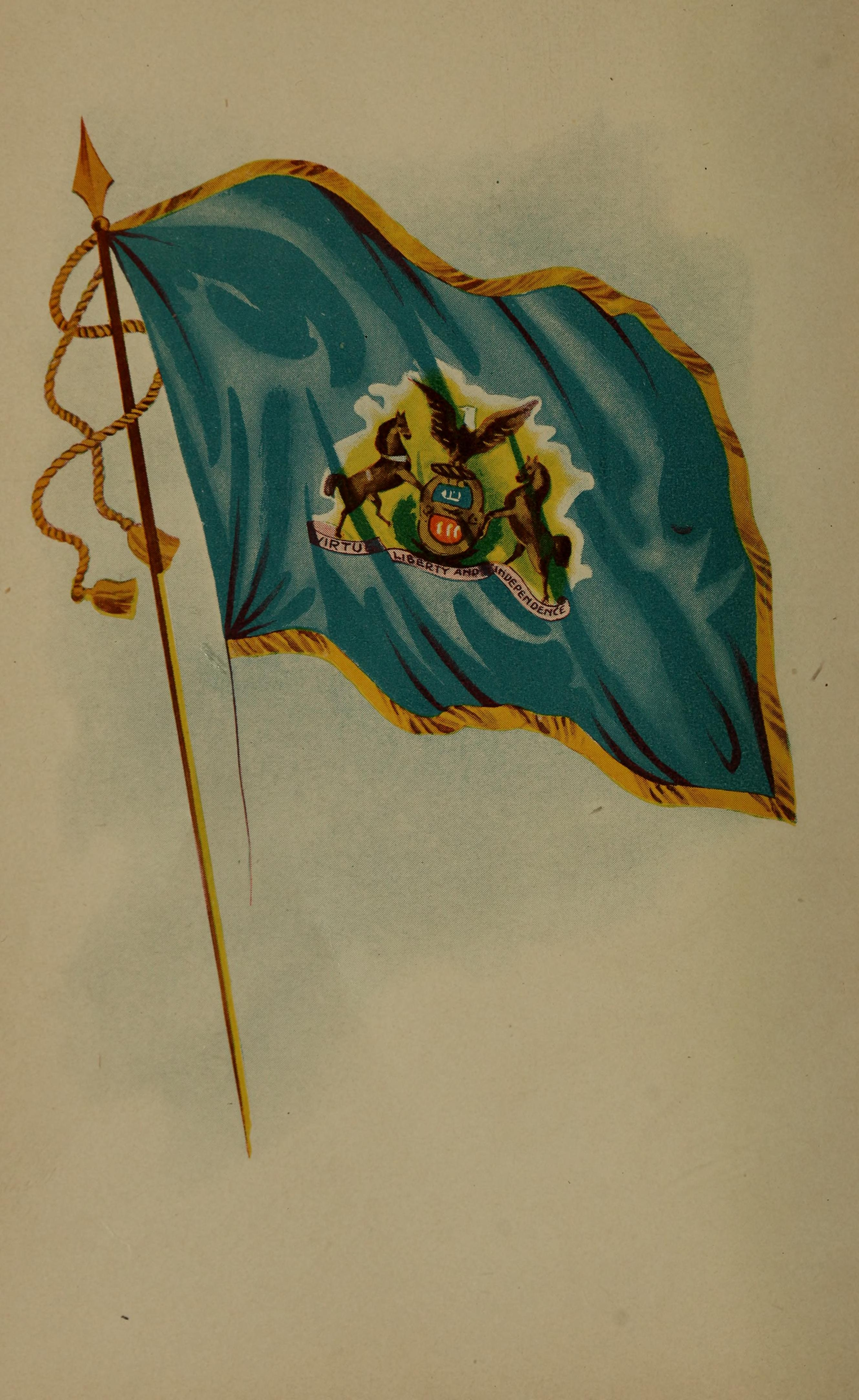
A Pennsylvania flag depicted in The Government of the People of the State of Pennsylvania (1902)

The state flag of Pennsylvania was established by an act approved on June 13, 1907 (P.L. 560, No. 373), which defined the official flag of the Commonwealth as follows:

...blue, the same color as the blue field in the flag of the United States, and of the following dimensions and design;

to wit, The length, or height, of the staff to be nine feet, including brass spear-head and ferrule, the fly of the said flag to be six feet and two inches, and to be four feet and six inches on the staff;

in the center of the flag there shall be embroidered in silk the same on both sides of the flag the coat of arms of the Commonwealth of Pennsylvania, in proportionate size;

the edge to be trimmed with knotted fringe of yellow silk, two and one-half inches wide;

a cord, with tassels, to be attached to the staff at the spear-head, to be eight feet and six inches long, and composed of white and blue strands.

=== Design of the coat of arms ===
A description of the Pennsylvania coat of arms was established by a commission in 1874 and reported to the General Assembly on March 17, 1875. This commission standardized the design based on a 1778 rendering by Caleb Lownes and formalized the arms as follows:

Shield: Party per fess, Azure and Vert. On a chief of the first, a ship under sail. On a fess, a plough, Proper. On a base of the second, three garbs, Or.

Crest: An eagle, rousant, Proper, on a wreath of its colors.

Supporters: Two horses, Sable, caparisoned for draught, rearing, respectant.

Motto: Virtue, Liberty, and Independence.

An earlier description in the Executive Minutes of July 1, 1809 (created pursuant to the Act of March 2, 1809, which authorized the Secretary of the Commonwealth to renew the Great Seal and record a written description) supplements the 1875 description by including the flanking botanical elements:

Flanking: On the sinister, a stock of maize; on the dexter, an olive branch.

== History ==
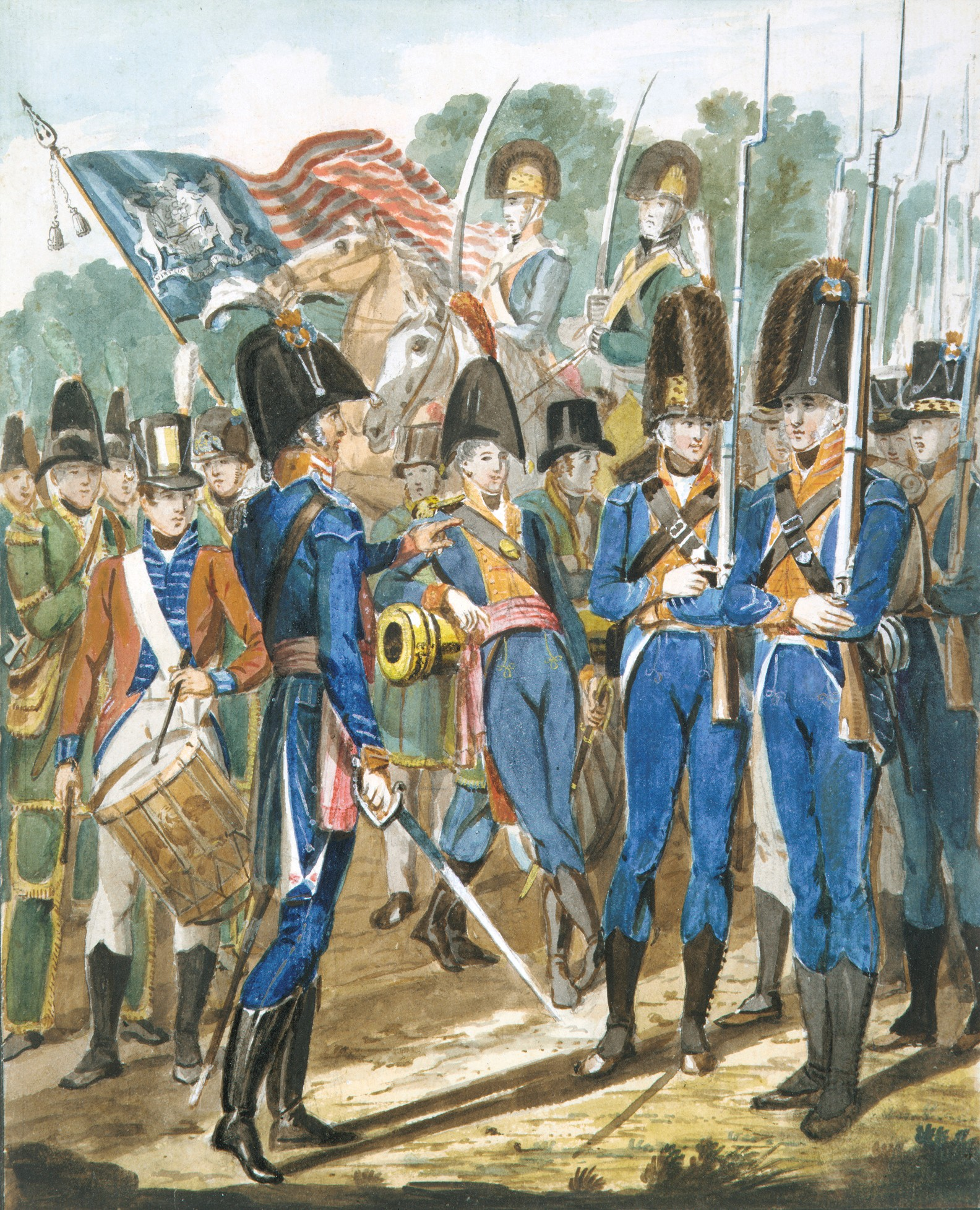
John Lewis illustration of the militia flag, c.1811-1813

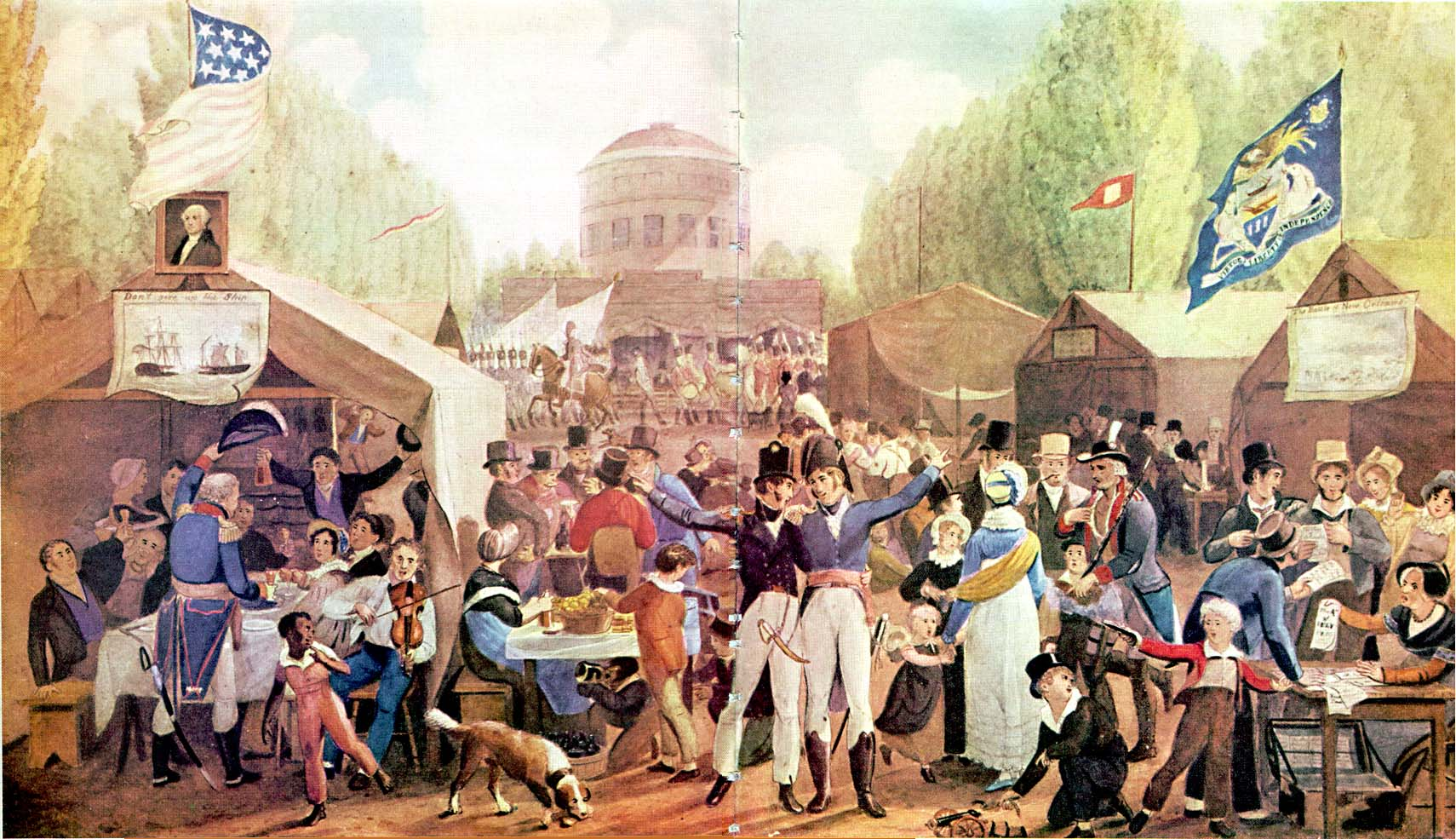
Celebration of July 4th, in Centre Square, Philadelphia, 1819. The militia flag is flying on the right.

=== Pre-official flags (before 1907) ===
An ensign of the Pennsylvania navy for use by vessels was adopted in 1777 during the Revolutionary period by authority of the Pennsylvania Navy Board, acting on behalf of the Commonwealth. The ensign consisted of a blue field with thirteen horizontal stripes (seven red and six white) in the canton, and was flown from the stern of state vessels. Accompanying this ensign was a long red pennant, marked with thirteen vertical red-and-white stripes near the hoist, and also a short pennant of solid red.

On April 9, 1799, the Pennsylvania General Assembly authorized the use of the state coat of arms on flags for the state militia. These flags took various forms over the years, most commonly featuring the coat of arms either replacing the field of stars in the union of the US flag,or being placed alone on a field of blue. The depiction of the coat of arms would also vary from flag to flag, as the colors in the escutcheon of the arms were changed in 1809, and the color of the horses was not standardized until 1875.

In 1805 Danish painter Christian Gullage was commissioned to paint the state coat of arms on a blue banner. It measured 4 feet by 2 feet, with gold fringe at the bottom.

In January of 1889, Benjamin Harrison was given a state flag from the Harrison Union Veteran Club while running for president. It bore a blue field with the state's coat of arms.

In 1892, during National Republican League Convention in Buffalo, New York state delegates carried with them a state flag. It bore a purple field with the states coat of arms in the middle, below it the words "Y. M. R. T. C." and "Pittsburg Penn."

In September of 1899, a man named J. C. Haydon donated a state flag to the Janesville Miner's Hospital. It was described as having a blue field with the state's coat of arms in the middle.

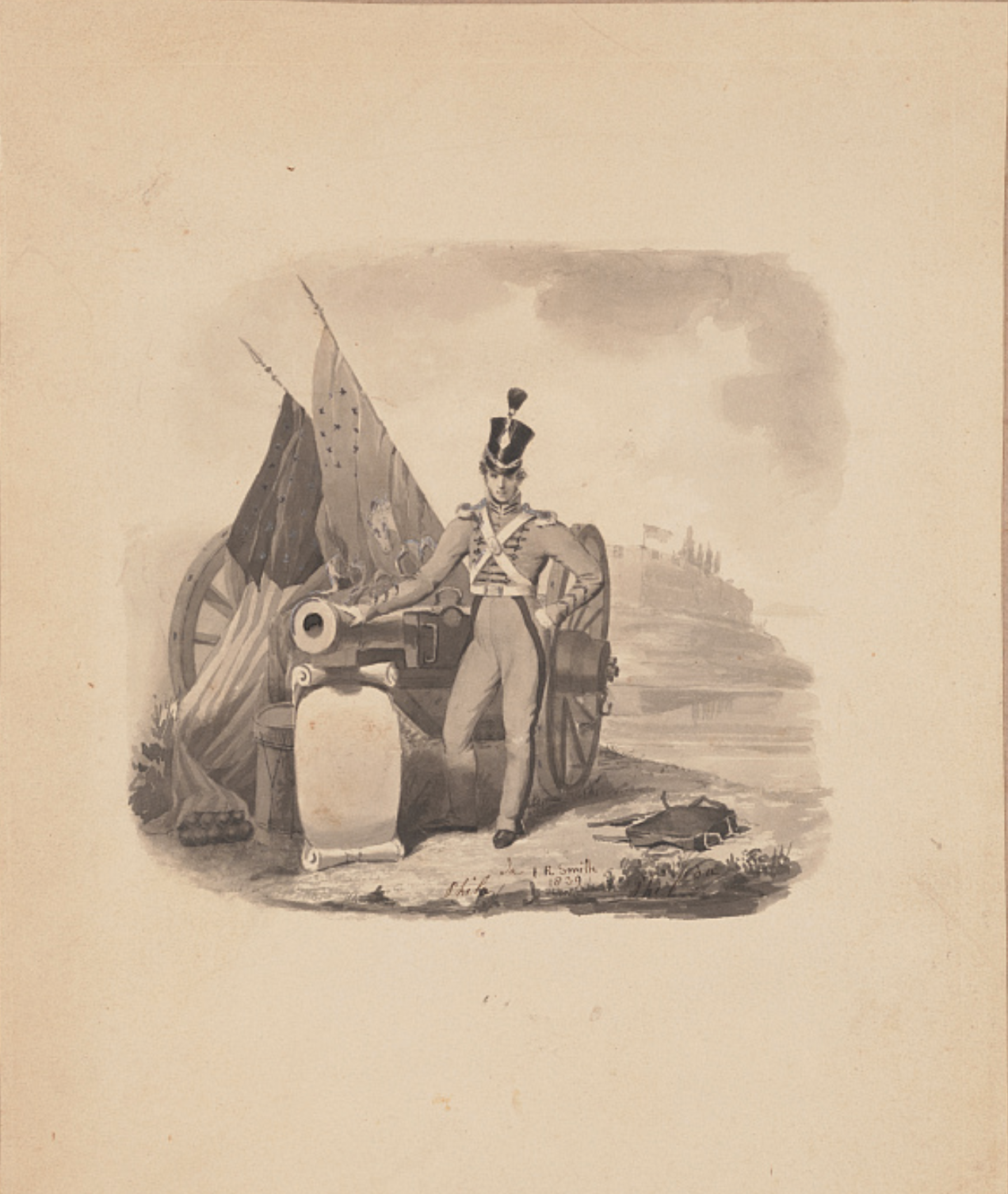
Illustration of soldier and the militia flag by John Rubens Smith, 1839

=== Current flag (1907–present) ===
The legislature eventually chose to create a standardized flag for general use, featuring a now-standardized coat of arms alone on a plain field of blue mandated to be the "same color as the blue field in the flag of the United States". This new flag was enacted by law on June 13, 1907.

=== Variants ===
On January 13 1917, during the contraction of the Hotel Pennsylvania a unique state flag was made for the lobby. It was similar to the state flag but with the words "Penn-Harris" below the coat of arms.

On January 15 1917, state outline flags to be flown from schools with approval from the Broad of Education. They were described to be 3 x 4 feet with the coat of arms in white and gold.

== Criticism and attempts to change the flag ==
The Pennsylvania flag has been criticized for the complexity of its design, and its inability to stand out from other similar state flags across the US. Several attempts have been made by the Pennsylvania legislature and the public to address these criticisms by changing or altering the flag.

=== 2001 NAVA Survey ===
In 2001, the North American Vexillological Association surveyed 100 of its members and 337 members of the general public on the designs of the 72 U.S. state, U.S. territorial and Canadian provincial flags. The survey ranked Pennsylvania's flag 57th out of the 72, with a score of 3.69 on a scale of 0 to 10. Its low ranking was attributed to both the complexity of the coat of arms on its design, and its inability to stand out among a sea of similar “seal on a bedsheet” designs common to more than half of U.S. state flags.

=== Attempts to add "Pennsylvania" to the flag (2004–2014) ===
Between 2004 and 2014, several attempts were made to add the word "Pennsylvania" to the state flag. According to former State Representative Tim Solobay (who introduced the first set of bills), this was intended to make Pennsylvania's flag more unique and identifiable.

While the bill failed to leave committee in the first two sessions it was introduced, a 2006 survey offered by Solobay's office to help refine the defined design may have swayed legislators to act on the bill, which was amended on May 7, 2007. On June 11, 2007, The Pennsylvania House of Representatives voted in favor of the bill, 164–31. The Senate State Government Committee never considered the bill, which died at the end of the Pennsylvania General Assembly's two-year session.

The bill was reintroduced by Solobay in 2009, and on the next session day, a second similar bill was introduced by former State Representative Gary Haluska with a competing definition of the design. Neither bill was raised in committee that session. Haluska's proposal was reintroduced alone in both the 2011–12 and 2013–14 sessions, and died in committee both times.

Proposals to change the flag between 2004 and 2014

2004–2007 proposal, adding "the word 'Pennsylvania' to be embroidered upon the flag in yellow silk."

2007–2010 proposal, adding the words "Commonwealth Of" to the top and "Pennsylvania" to the bottom of the flag in yellow silk, and arching the lettering around the coat of arms

2009–2014 proposal, adding the word "Pennsylvania" in yellow silk "centered within a symmetrical red festoon, similar to that containing the State motto; and the festoon to be centered above the bald eagle on the coat of arms."

=== The Keystone Flag ===
The "Keystone Flag"

In 2017 the "Keystone Flag" was designed by Tara Stark, a Pennsylvanian woman. The flag incorporates a keystone symbol, the de-facto state emblem of Pennsylvania, into a tricolor design using the colors of the state's coat of arms as a reference to the symbolism of the existing flag.

The flag gained popularity in online vexillological circles, winning multiple online contests, and began receiving wider attention following high-profile changes to the flag of Mississippi and the flag of Utah. The design was formally released into the public domain in August 2022. Stark launched a Kickstarter campaign in November 2022 to print flags and create other merchandise featuring the design, raising more than $4,500. The design later began being sold by multiple unrelated manufacturers and has since seen more popular use, including on a lapel pin worn by state representative Izzy Smith-Wade-El, and has been referenced by multiple media outlets.

=== Broad redesign efforts (2023-present) ===
On June 16, 2023, Pennsylvania State Representative Joe Webster released a memorandum proposing a commission to "study the history of the state flag, solicit design submissions for a new state flag, and recommend changes to the state flag." A House Resolution was formally introduced later that month, but did not receive a hearing before the legislative session ended. Webster has issued a new memorandum for the 2025-26 session.

== Galleries ==
=== Historical depictions of the Pennsylvania flag ===
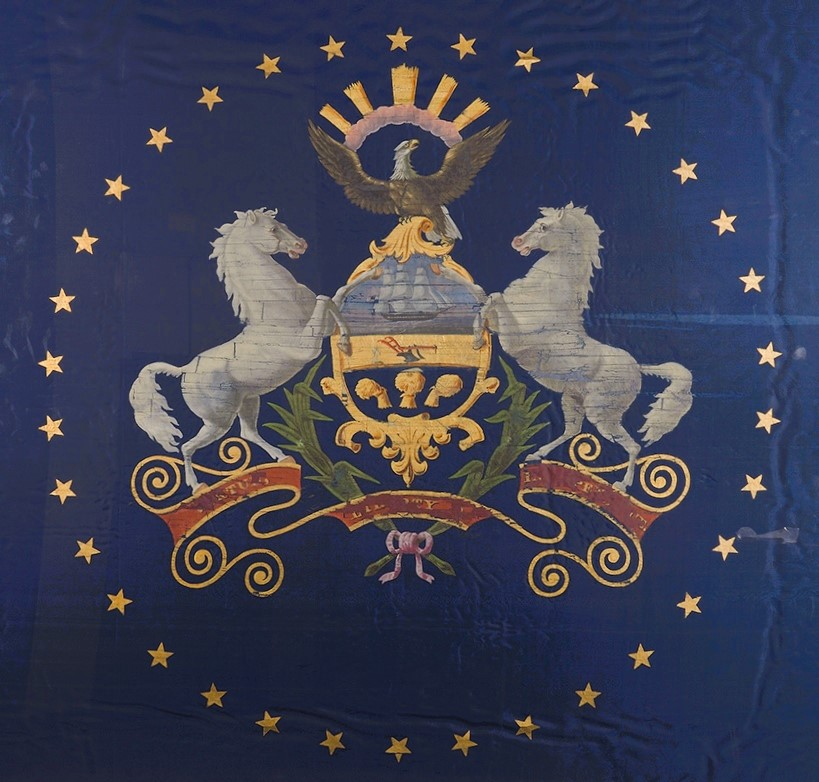
A Pennsylvania flag from 1863, featuring a ring of stars around the state coat of arms. Made in November 1863 by a Philadelphia flag manufacturer for Governor Curtin's use during the Gettysburg National Cemetery's dedication on November 19, 1863.

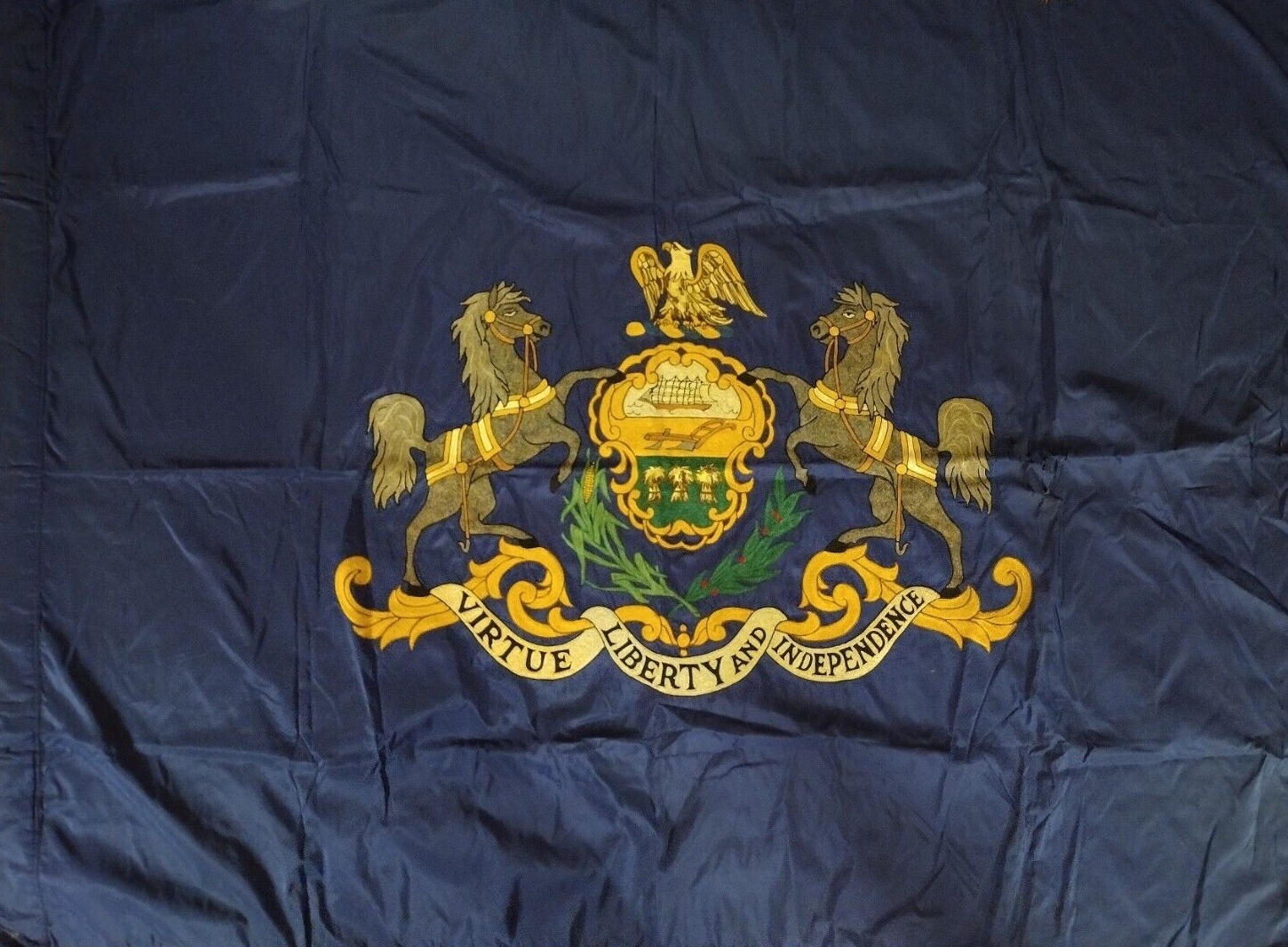
A Pennsylvania state flag that may have been used by a National Guard unit during World War I, depicting a white scroll.

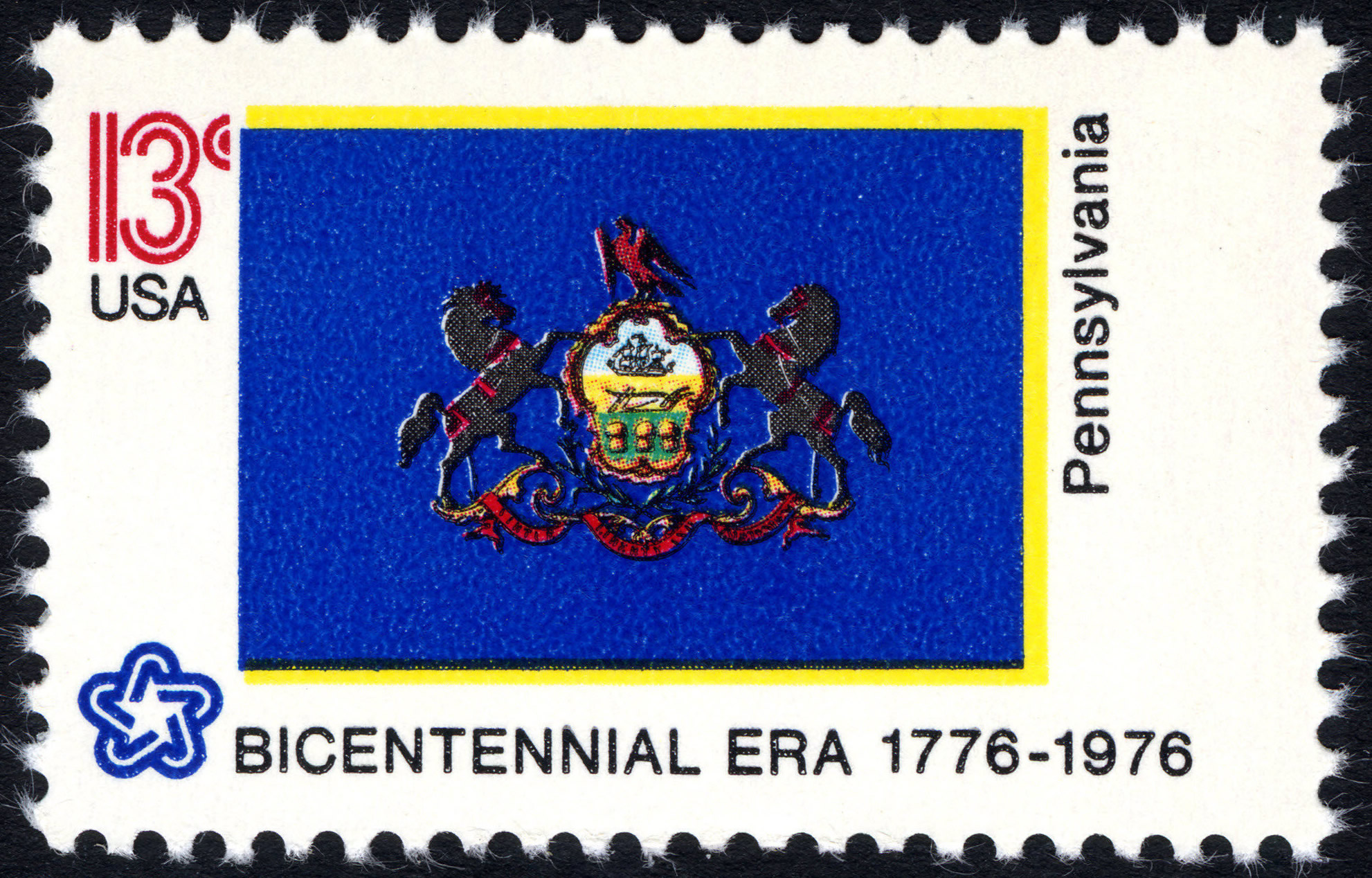
The Pennsylvania state flag as depicted in the 1976 bicentennial postage stamp series.

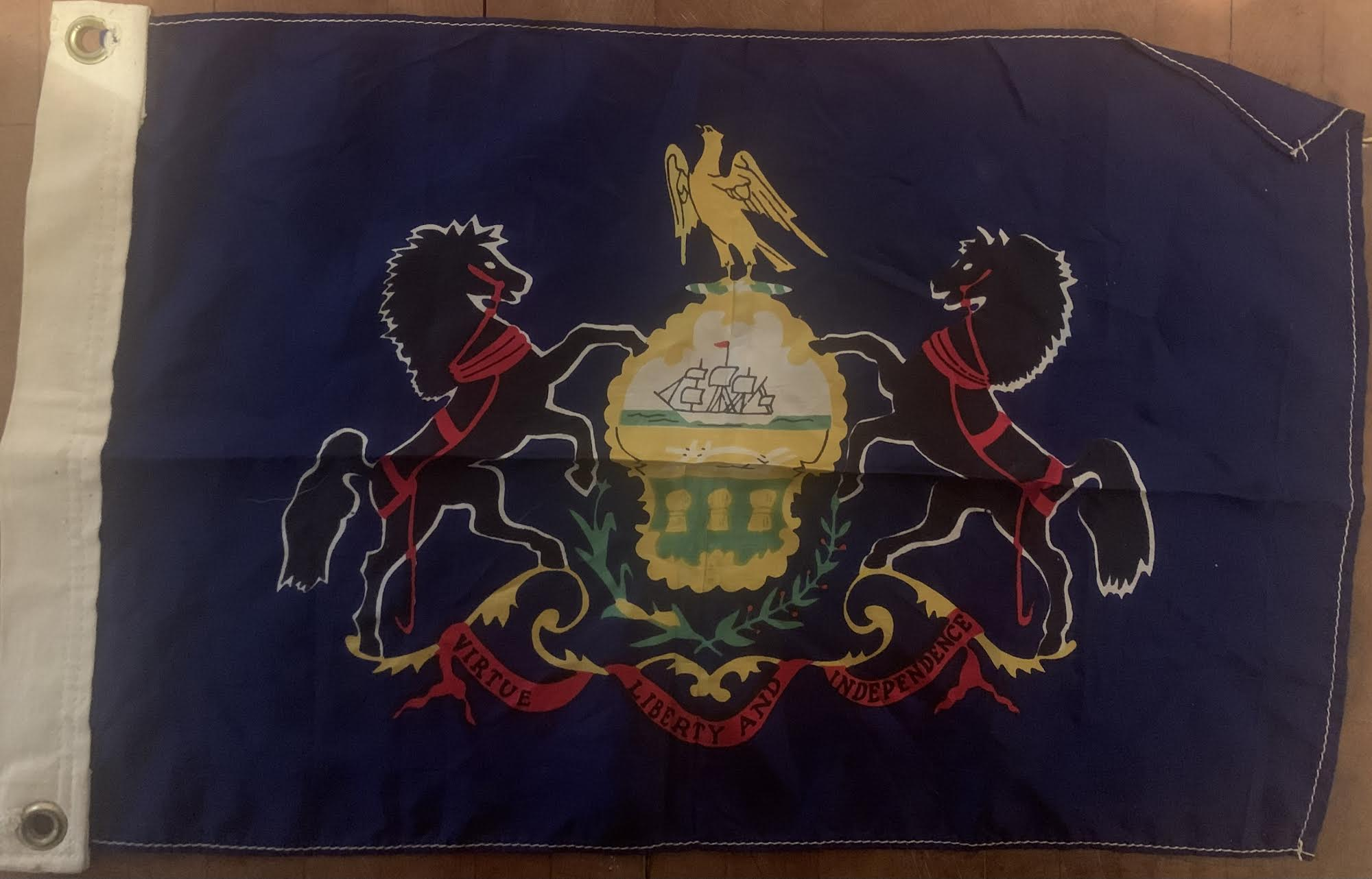
The flag with a golden eagle.

=== Flags associated with Pennsylvania ===
Standard of the governor of Pennsylvania (see also: Flags of governors of the U.S. states)

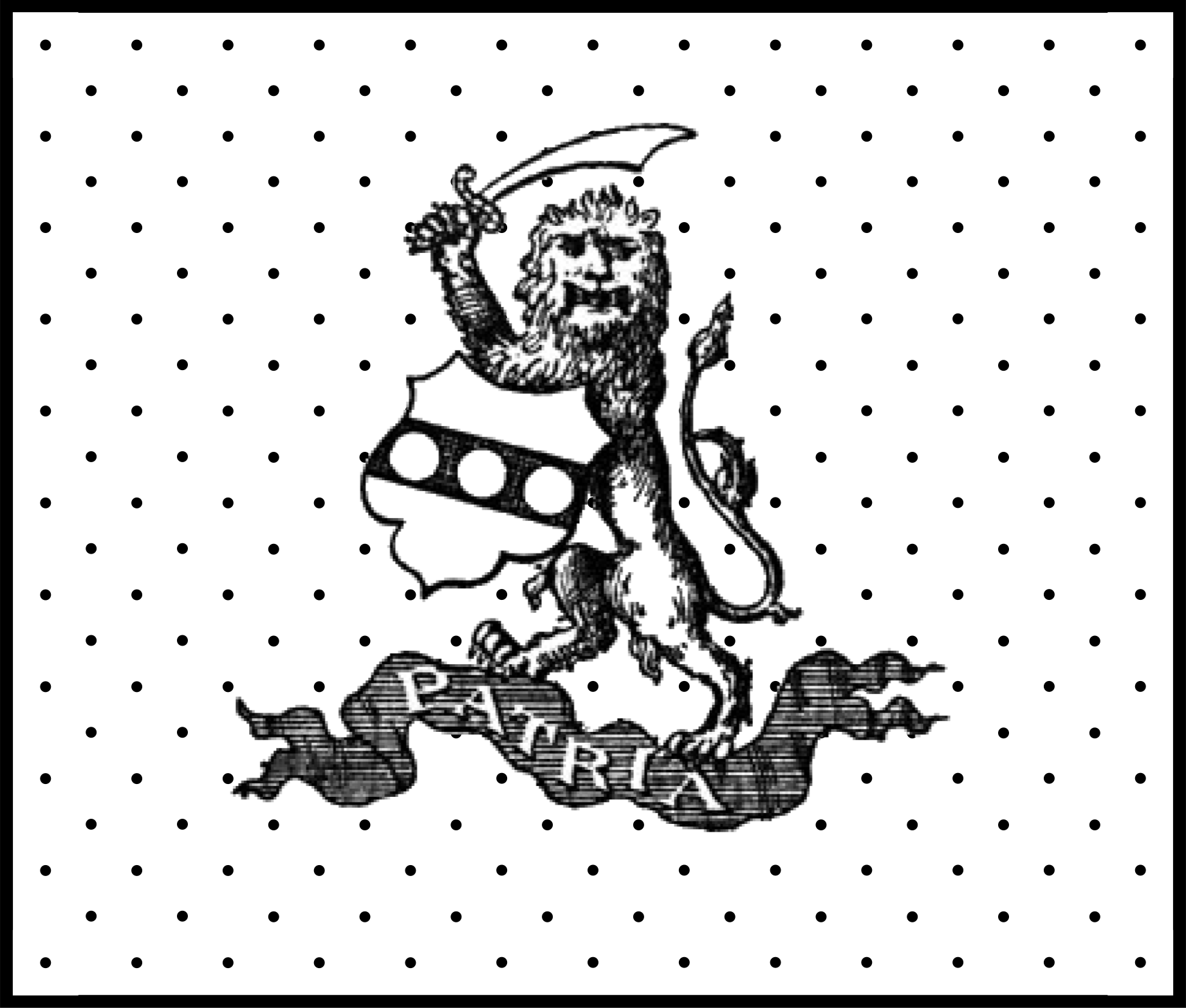
1747 flag of Pennsylvania Associators (now the modern 111th Infantry Regiment and 28th Infantry Division) designed by Ben Franklin. (The field is of buff)

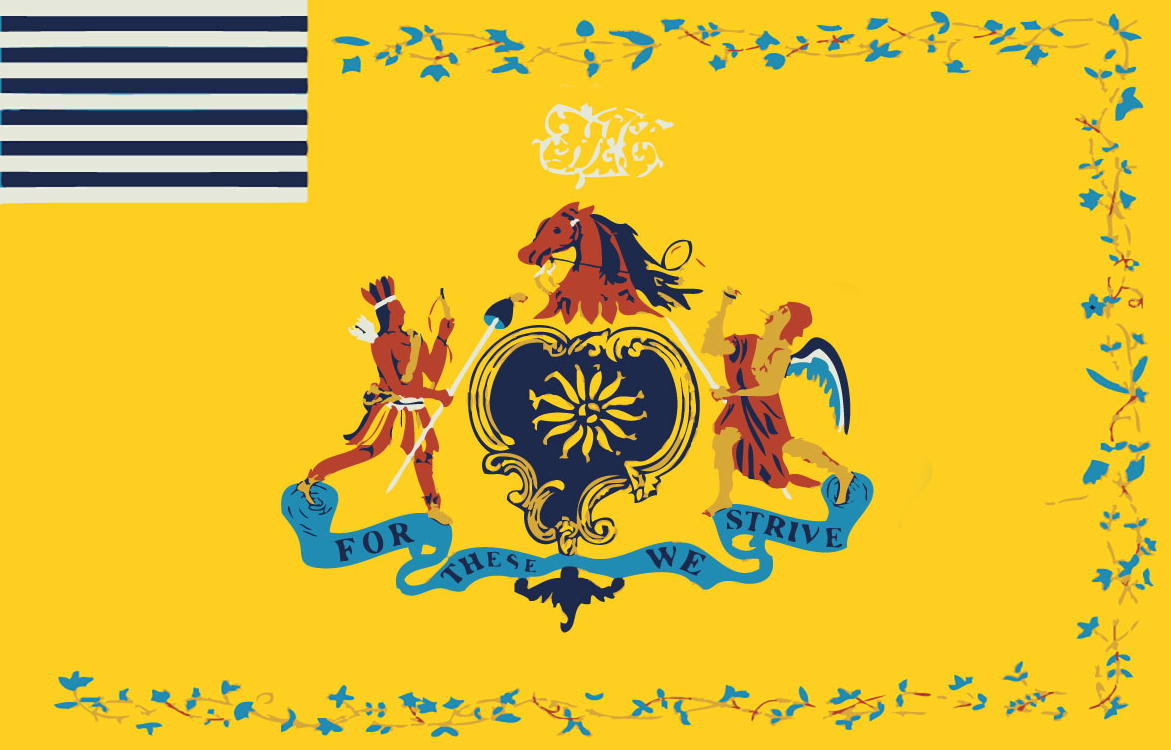
Flag of First Troop, Philadelphia Light Horse, a Pennsylvania cavalry unit created just before the Revolutionary War

The Brandywine flag

A flag which may have been used during the Whiskey Rebellion

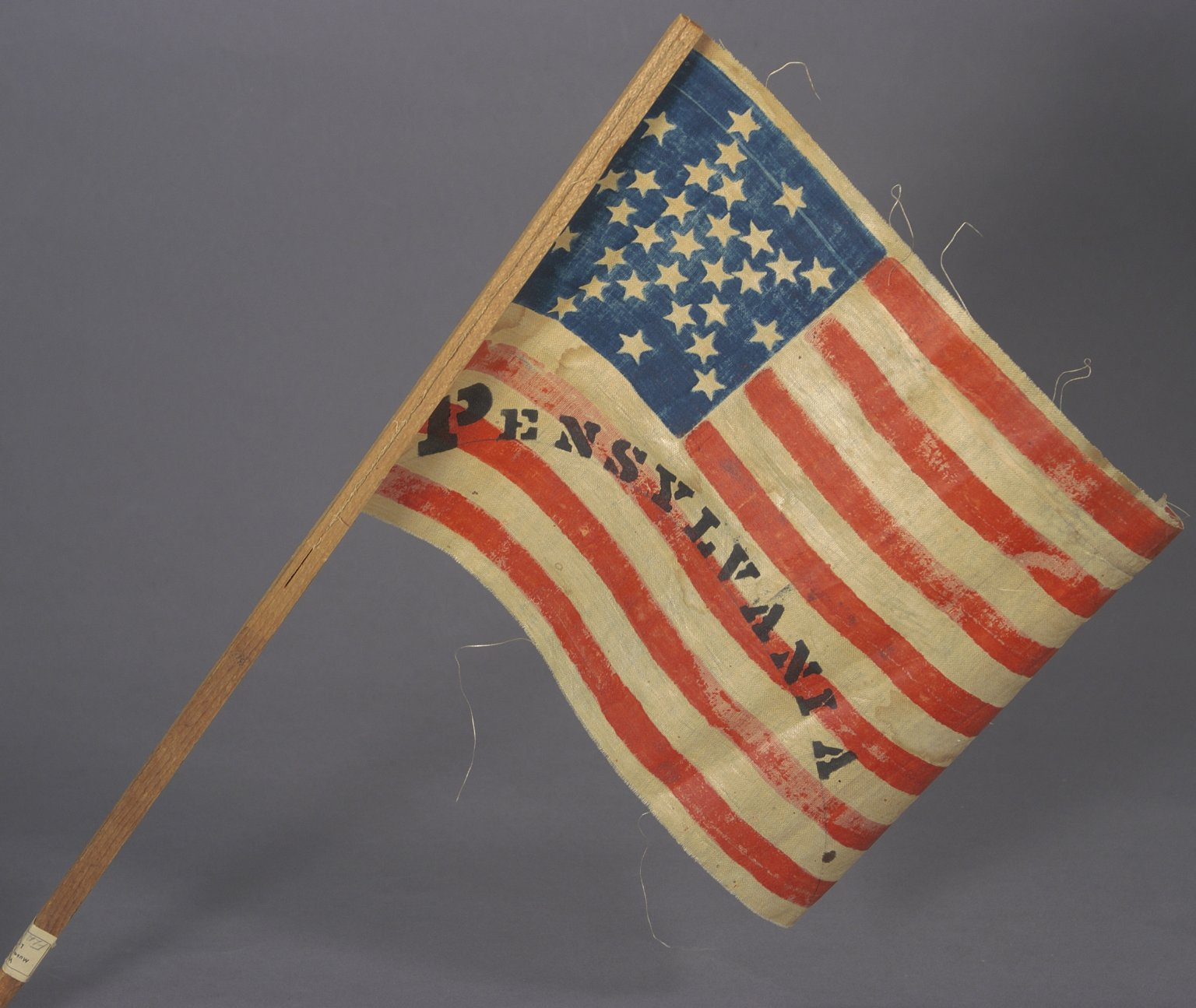
29-star American flag bearing the state's name in the stripes

Pennsylvania Navy Ensign, American Revolution.

Recreation of a Pennsylvania Bicentennial Flag, featuring a likeness of William Penn

== See also ==
- Flags of the U.S. states and territories
- List of Pennsylvania state symbols
- Keystone symbol
