= Coat of arms of Pennsylvania =

Coat of arms of the U.S. state of Pennsylvania

Coat of arms of the Commonwealth of Pennsylvania

Versions
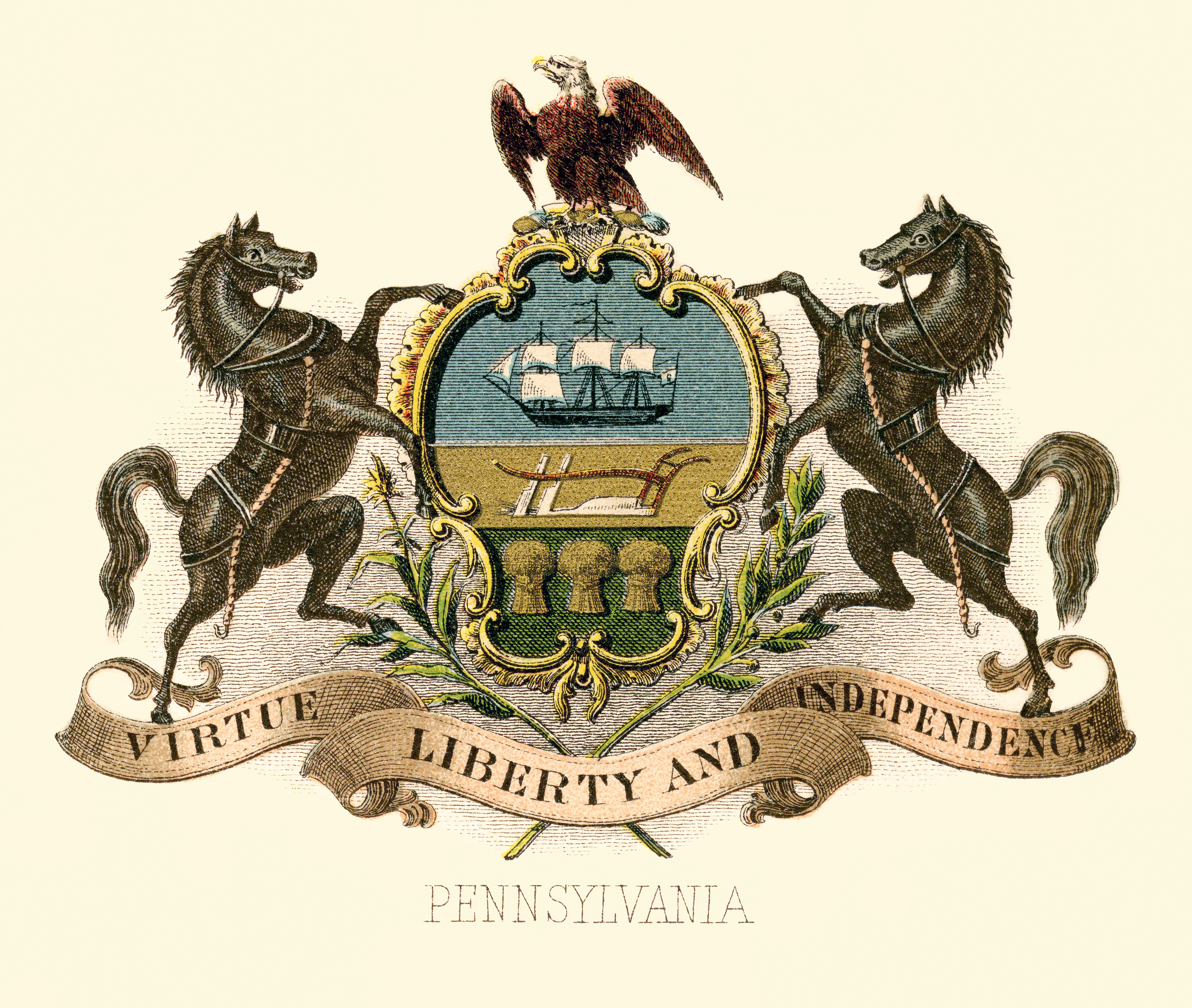
- Historical coat of arms (illustrated, 1876)

- The coat of arms is often used in the form of a seal
- Armiger: Commonwealth of Pennsylvania
- Adopted: 1778
- Crest: Bald eagle
- Torse: Gold and White
- Shield: Tierced per fess azure, Or, and vert; in chief a ship at sea proper; in fess a plough proper; in base three sheaves of wheat proper
- Supporters: Horses
- Motto: Virtue, Liberty, and Independence

Seal of the Commonwealth of Pennsylvania

Versions
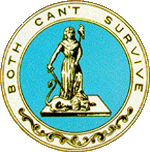
- Reverse
- Armiger: Commonwealth of Pennsylvania
- Motto: Both Can't Survive

The coat of arms of Pennsylvania is an official emblem of the Commonwealth of Pennsylvania, alongside the seal and state flag, and was adopted in 1778.

The state seal of Pennsylvania was authorized by the Pennsylvania General Assembly in 1791, and is "a symbol of authenticity which verifies that proclamations, commissions and other papers of state are legal and official."

Unlike most state seals, it has an obverse and a reverse. The Secretary of the Commonwealth is the keeper of the seal, and has the duty of authenticating government documents, and proclaiming new law as enacted through its use.

== Design and symbolism ==
The Pennsylvania coat of arms features a shield crested by a North American bald eagle, flanked by horses, and adorned with symbols of Pennsylvania's strengths—a ship carrying state commerce to all parts of the world; a clay-red plough, a symbol of Pennsylvania's rich natural resources; and three golden sheaves of wheat, representing fertile fields and Pennsylvania's wealth of human thought and action. An olive branch and cornstalk cross limbs beneath—symbols of peace and prosperity. The state motto, "Virtue, Liberty and Independence", appears festooned below. Atop the coat of arms is a bald eagle, representing Pennsylvania's loyalty to the United States.

== Seal design ==
The obverse of the seal has a central image of a shield containing a ship under full sail, a plow, and three sheaves of wheat. These symbols represent the importance of commerce, labor, perseverance, and agriculture to the state's economy, as well as several of its geographic components (Philadelphia represented by the ship, for example). On either side of the shield are a stalk of Indian corn and an olive branch, representing the state's recognition of its past and hopes for the future. Atop the shield an eagle symbolizes the state's sovereignty. The outer ring of the seal bears the words "Seal of the State of Pennsylvania," despite the state's official designation as the Commonwealth of Pennsylvania. The reverse side, or counterseal, pictures Lady Liberty dominating Tyranny in the form of a lion, along with the warning across the top, "Both Can't Survive."

== History ==
Pennsylvania’s coat of arms first appeared on paper money issued in 1777. The original design was created by Caleb Lownes of Philadelphia, but the Legislature changed it several times before settling on the current design, which is similar to Lownes’.

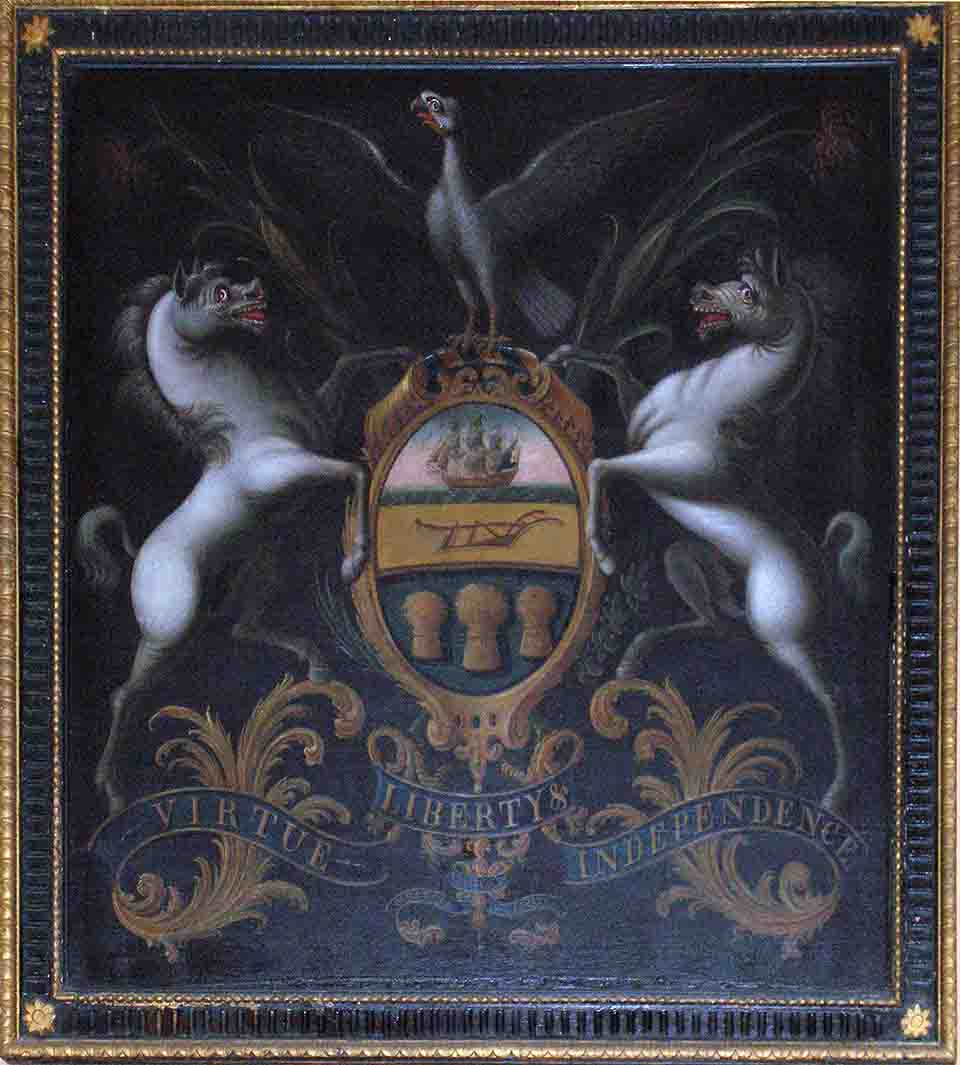
The coat of arms that replaced the arms of George III in the Pennsylvania State House ca. 1784.

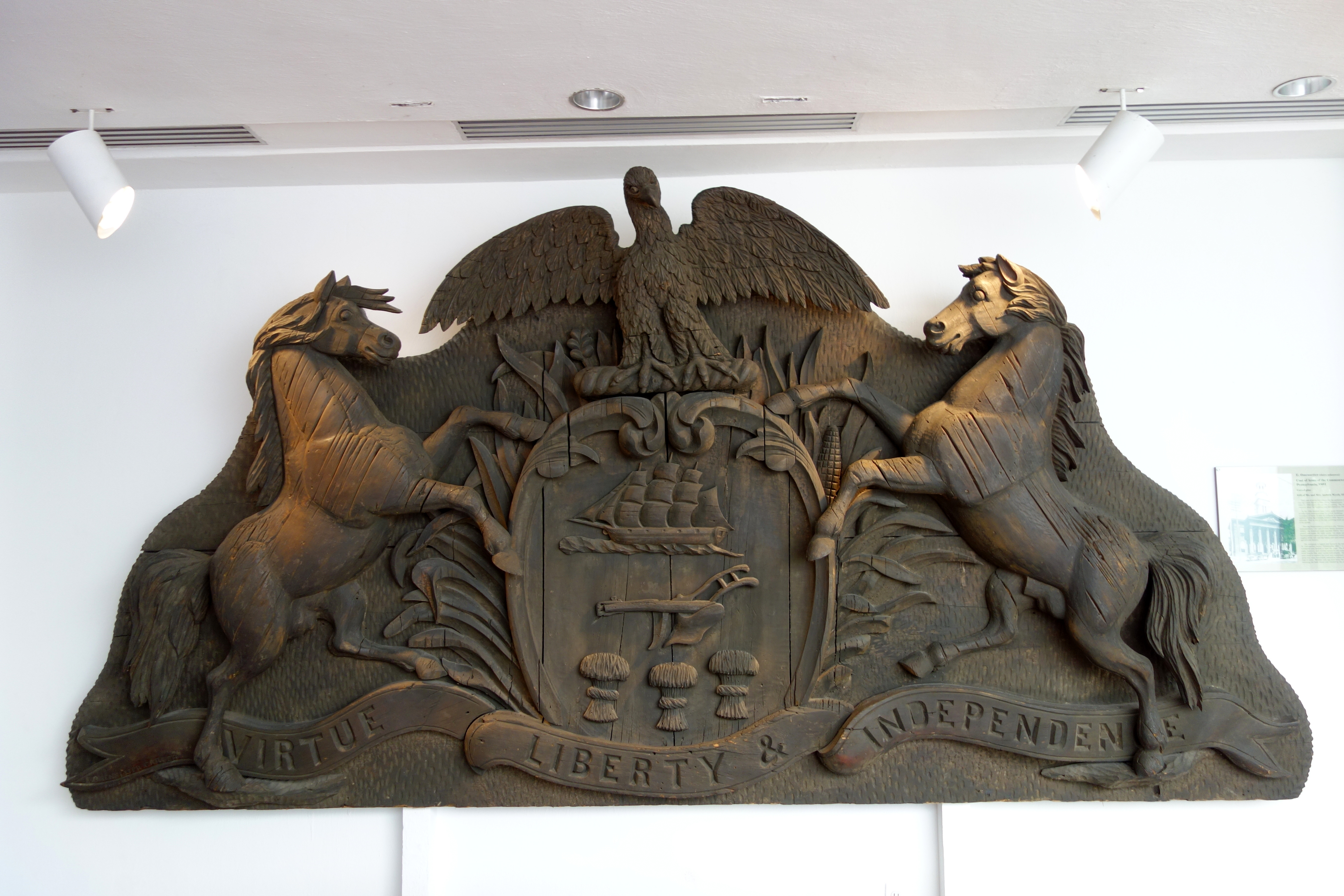
The arms the Commonwealth carved by E. Omensetter for the pediment Dauphin County court house in 1861.

== Use ==
Besides being used by itself, the coat of arms is used on the state flag, many governmental seals of the state, and the flag of the governor.

Flag of Pennsylvania

Flag of the governor of Pennsylvania

Seal of the governor of Pennsylvania

Seal of the secretary of the commonwealth

Seal of the attorney general of Pennsylvania

Seal of the auditor general of Pennsylvania

Seal of the inspector general of Pennsylvania

Seal of the Supreme Court of Pennsylvania

Seal of the Superior Court of Pennsylvania

Seal of the House of Representatives of Pennsylvania

Seal of the Senate of Pennsylvania

Seal of the Pennsylvania Court of Judicial Discipline

Seal of the Pennsylvania Department of Corrections

Seal of the Pennsylvania Department of Public Welfare

== See also ==
- Coats of arms of the U.S. states
- Keystone symbol
