= Episcopal Youth Community =

Term for church youth groups in the United States

Episcopal Youth Community, used more often as the abbreviation EYC, is the usual name given to youth groups in the Episcopal Church in the United States of America. Their scope tends to include 6th through 12th grades, sometimes split into Junior and Senior EYC groups. EYC groups are formed within church parishes, and activities may also be organized at the diocese or broader levels in the church hierarchy.

Besides "Episcopal Youth Community," the EYC abbreviation is sometimes said to stand for "Episcopal Youth Commission" and more rarely, "Episcopal Youth Club." Formerly, it stood for "Episcopal Young Churchmen."
