= Erie Yacht Club =

Yacht club in Pennsylvania, United States

Coordinates: 42°7′18″N 80°7′48″W

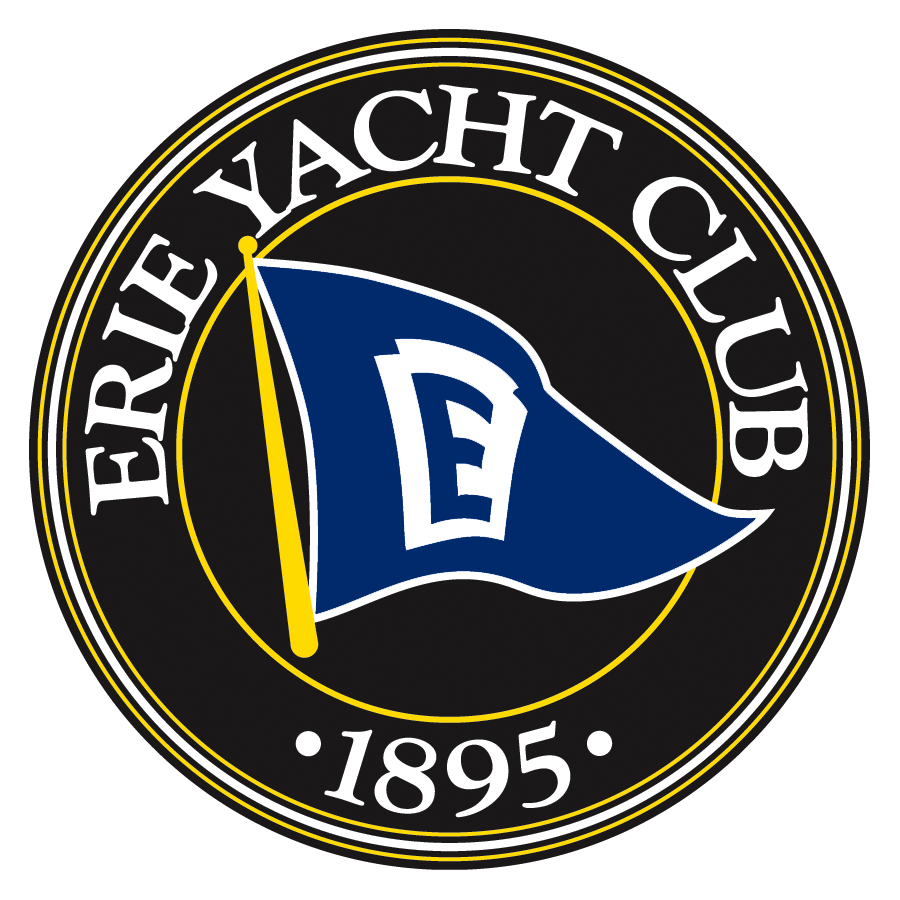
- Emblem

- Burgee
- Short name: EYC
- Founded: 1895
- Location: Erie, Pennsylvania
- Website: www.erieyachtclub.org

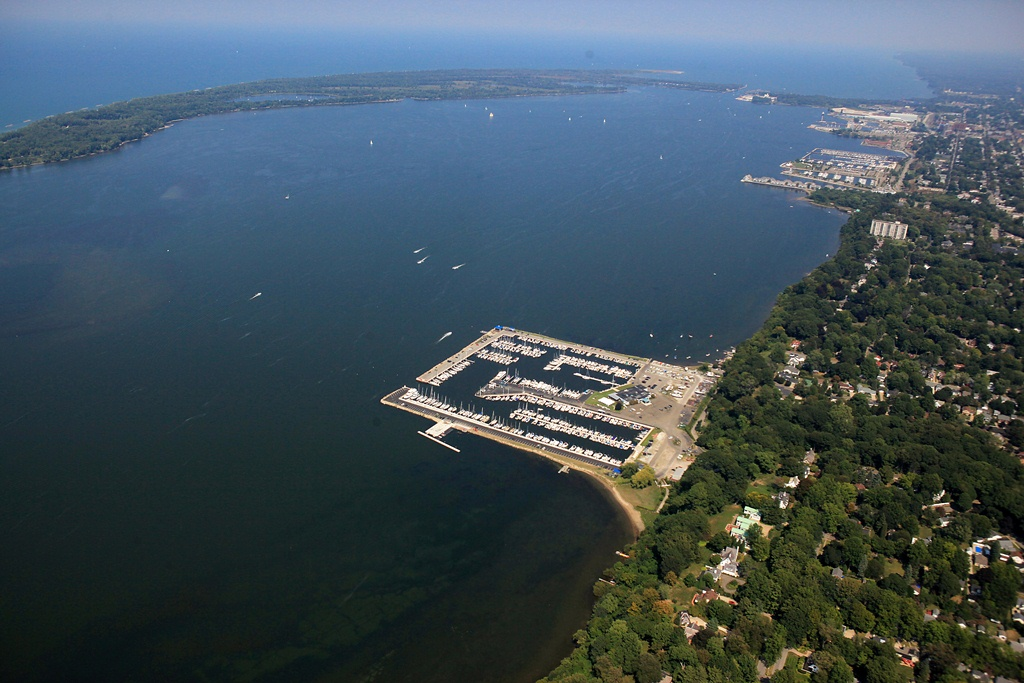
Presque Isle Bay 2012

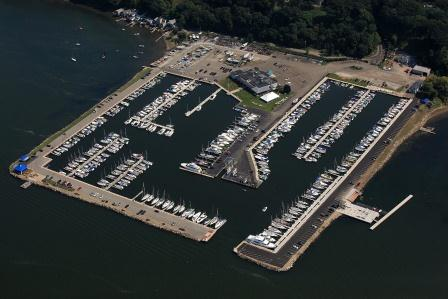
Erie Yacht Club 2012

Established in 1895, the Erie Yacht Club, is a private club located on the shore of Presque Isle Bay in Erie, Pennsylvania. The purpose of the Erie Yacht Club is to maintain, develop, and enlarge the facilities for yachting and boating, to encourage and develop yachting and other aquatic sports, to promote social recreational activities. To improve yachting and boating facilities at the Erie Yacht Club basin and in the area of the Erie Harbor generally.

== Early history ==
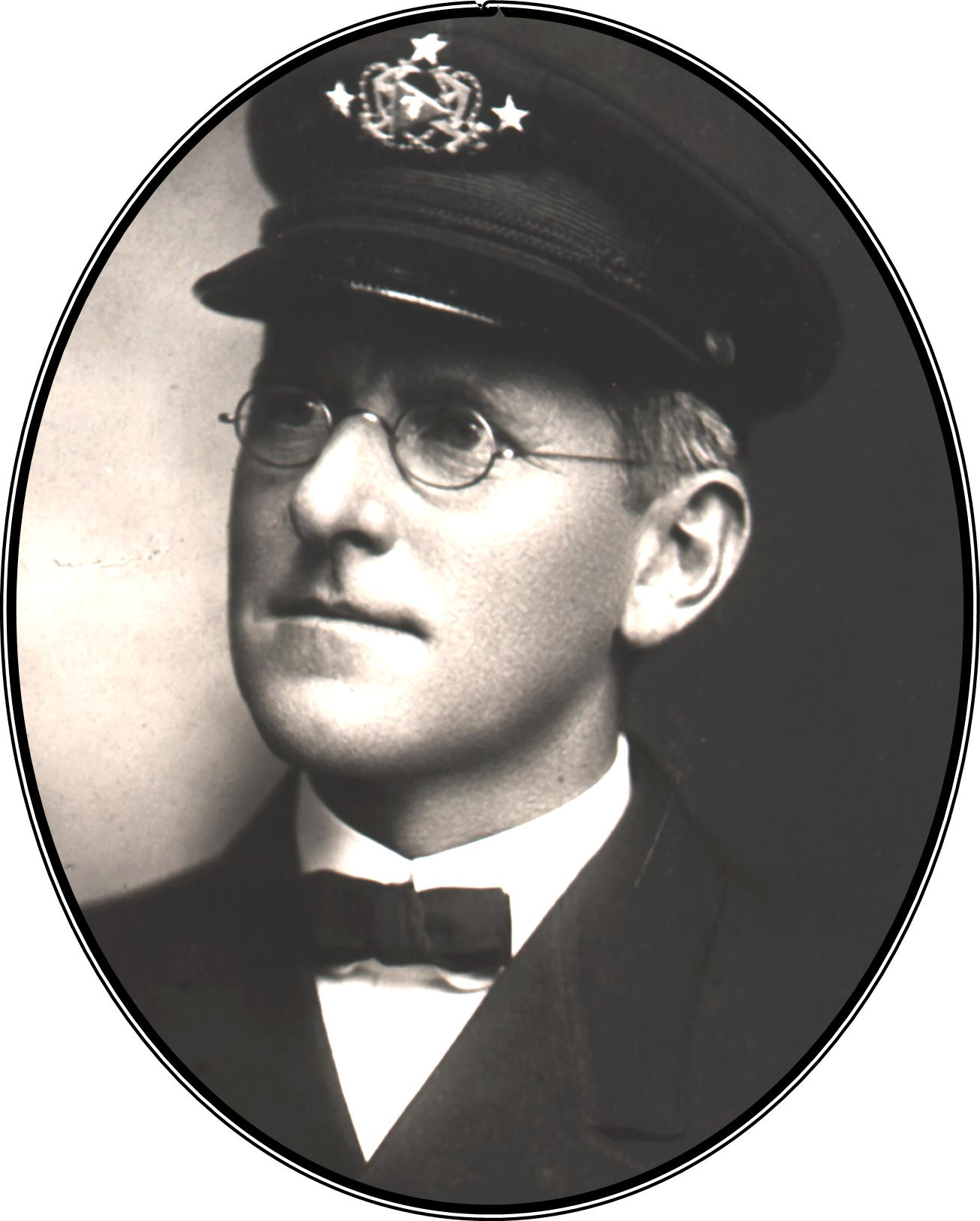
Commodore Bliss

On September 14, 1894, George T. Bliss, who served as Erie Yacht Club's Commodore from 1895 to 1903 and again from 1908 to 1910, sent out about fifty circulars, information forms and return envelopes to interested parties concerning, "a boating club in Erie that will take all kinds of boats."

His broadside calling for the founding of a club included his proposition that the club would have to have a clubhouse plus a low building to keep sculls, small boat, and equipment. There were many interested "Erieites" among the first to respond, so much so, that a second circular was sent out on September 20, 1894, calling for a meeting on September 20, 1894.

The organizational meeting was held in the Writing Room of the Reed House on North Park Row. The initial meeting was well attended. Forty-eight were on hand and seventeen names were sent in to the proper committee, so the organization started off with practically 65 names on the roll. While the name did not survive, Bliss originally proposed that the club be called the Keystone Yacht Club.

By October, 137 individuals had applied for membership. The first regular meeting was scheduled for November 14 at the Reed house. It was announced that "no charter member will have a vote unless he has paid at least $5 of the initiation, which is $15." All persons becoming members after January 1, 1895, were to be "charged $20 initiation fee and $5 semi-annual dues."

At this point it was time to fish or cut bait. In his May 1896, article in The Rudder, Bliss laconically noted that: "Meetings were held that were well attended until money was suggested. We couldn't get a corporal's guard together for weeks. But we kept at it, and finally on Wednesday, Nov. 14, 1894, the organization was effected." The first officers elected to serve the club were George T. Bliss (Commodore), George Berriman (Vice Commodore), C.C. Wicks (Rear Commodore), E.B. Lynch (Secretary) and Walter Reitzel, (Treasurer). The first members elected to the board of directors were: George Pratt, Charles H. Strong, William Nick, W. Boyd Hays, William P. Atkinson and W. J. Robertson.

The first order of business was to select a site for the new club. The City of Erie leased water lots to the Club at the foot of Myrtle Street, east of what is now the Erie Water Authority Building. After several months of work on the bidding process and construction the Erie Yacht Club's first building was dedicated on July 18, 1895. It was a beautiful two-story building with outdoor decks on the north and west side. Considerations given the ladies were a special entrance so that "they do not have to pass through the house," and the prohibition of liquor. As Bliss wrote in The Rudder: "We allow no liquor to be used or partaken of on or about the premises. This does not prohibit its being left at the club for boat owners, and being taken aboard the boats. We adopted this last rule as an experiment, and it works to perfection."

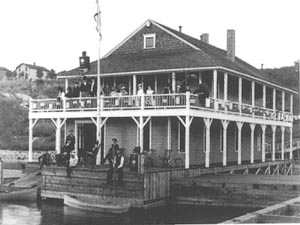
Clubhouse 1895

The fleet at the new anchorage included: Mystic, and three other small steamers, four naptha launches, three large center board sloops, four schooners, three yawls, three small sloops, two canoes, two shells and an eight oared shell. One of the latter was the Miriam, M, built and owned by W.L. Morrison, one of the club's members who achieved considerable boating fame. The Miriam's anchor is displayed in the traffic circle near our present club's entrance.

By the turn of the century, things began to change. The gasoline engine was powering launches previously driven by naphtha. Mostly crude two-cylinder affairs, they were temperamental and had a decided influence in changing the vocabulary of owners. For Club members, "gasoline was delivered in five gallon cans from wagons at ten cents a gallon and no tax."

Gasoline also led people away from the water. Judge Emory A. Walling was to note that there were many who were attracted "to the modern craze for bicycles and automobiles." The Club directors did everything possible to counteract this trend. They got a permit from the Coast Guard "to pull yachts out" in the winter at Crystal Point on Misery Bay where the Perry Monument was later built.

In addition, social events were established. The Club archives record one member's observation that in 1900, the Club "had a social urge and rented Tracy's Point", a hotel built on the site of the present Erie Water Authority Sommerheim Pumping Station. Erie Yacht Club Station No. 1, as it was known, was the focus of many social events for members and their families. Transportation was by bus, trolley car or by the motor launch, Dandy of Erie, which was termed by Bliss, "a little dude of a steam launch." The docks were repaired and the buildings painted, and the refurbished country club "became a very popular rendezvous." It burned in the winter of 1901–1902, although not all members mourned the loss. One chronicler wrote: "It was not a fundamental success and fortunately the building burned before the members drank themselves to death."

However, the short life of Station No. 1 pointed out the need for a larger facility. The Anchorage, as the Clubhouse at the foot of Myrtle Street was known, had become too small for the club's needs, and plans were begun to replace it with something larger. The need became more critical as the newspapers reported that the Water Supply Commission was going to reclaim the water lots used by the club to expand the Water Works.

== New Location ==
In 1917, Commodore Henri G. Chatain negotiated with Mr. J. A. Root, president of the Kahkwa Park Realty Company, Inc., for the last remaining property on the waterfront. In a letter dated March 21, 1917, Root proposed to donate the land "west of the ravine and below the cliff" in Kahkwa Parkto the Erie Yacht Club. In return, the club was to pay $5,000 towards the road work and maintain the walls and the slope of the ravine without "marring the natural beauty of the surrounding lands."

With the land secured and permission granted from the Water Supply Commission of Pennsylvania "to construct a dock, retaining wall and fill" on the south shore of Presque Isle Bay, construction began. The location posed difficulties from the beginning. The beach area was made marshy by a stream which ran down the ravine. Until the creek was controlled, no road could be built, and it was necessary to lower materials by block and tackle.

Construction was made more difficult by the breach at the neck of Presque Isle (which remained open until 1920) and the United States' declaration of war on April 6, 1917. However, "the original clubhouse was torn down and E.H. Scott used his yacht, Roamer, to tow much of the lumber to the new location." Commodore Chatain headed a work crew which built the first road down the hill, while a temporary Clubhouse was built by Herman Lund with the help of a number of members at the south end of the newly constructed west dock. Still in use, the Canoe House now houses the office of the Dockmaster. The members constructed a stiff-legged derrick permitting launching and retrieval of their boats.

However, a proper Clubhouse awaited construction. Plans and specifications for a three-story building "to be done in a first-class, neat and workman-like manner" were drawn up by architect Clement S. Kirby. Kirchner Brothers submitted the winning bid for construction at $17,000, and Oscar Nick won the plumbing contract. Although they had initial problems securing payment, eventually both were paid.

The season of 1919 began under difficulties, with access to the club almost barred by muddy roads, the grounds themselves a veritable mud hole, and buildings still under construction. In spite of the open Winter and Spring, boat owners were laggard about getting their craft into the water, and the confusion and disorder of construction work made itself felt until well into the season.

But finally, buildings were finished, moorings installed, docks and piers constructed, grounds graded, drained, and seeded, driveway parking spaces paved and walks laid out. The marine railway was constructed, tennis courts built, a club spar erected, and later a locker house [still extant] built upon a flooring laid down as a temporary dancing pavilion. Lights, signs, screens and a hundred other refining details followed in their place, and the club was finally in shape barely in time for the formal opening on August 22, 1919.

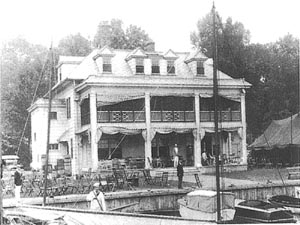
Clubhouse 1920

On September 30, Commodore E.H. Scott and the membership closed the season with "a monster clambake", confident in their preparations for hosting the I.L.Y.A. Regatta in 1920. Less than one month later (October 28), the United States embarked upon a novel - and ultimately unsuccessful - experiment known as Prohibition. As long-time Club secretary and historian George O. Loesel wrote: "Prohibition reared its ugly head . . . and Mr. Booze was no longer the money maker [and] thus considerable revenue was denied the club."

The "Roaring Twenties", replete with gambling, prostitution, rum-running (a profitable alternative enterprise) and bootlegging "bath-tub gin", had enormous impact. John G. Carney in his, Highlights of Erie Politics, said that the "only dry thing in Erie was the inside of a light bulb." However, the Erie Yacht Club, like the rest of the country was officially dry.

The country club atmosphere of the new facility led to a broader membership base and activities. The Club went beyond the "manly sports" of sailing, power boat racing, ice boating, fishing and hunting, and placed recreation in a broader context. Ice skating, tobogganing, quoits, ground bowling, tennis and beach golf were available to members and their families. The new facility had a restaurant and an outdoor grill, a trap-shooting range, quoit grounds, two tennis courts and areas set aside for ground bowling and beach golf. Card parties and regularly scheduled bridge sessions, dances and Saturday night parties and dances became regular features of the club.

== Hard Times ==
The good times ended in 1929. Winter storms ravaged Presque Isle and the bay shore, and October was to bring the stock market crash inaugurating the Great Depression. One writer recalled:

We have had some bad storms but none to compare with the one in 1929, which broke up our docks and front porch and carried them down the bay. A large gasoline tank in the ground broke free and was destroyed. This tragedy came close to finishing the club, for it was the year of the "Big Depression" and both members and money were scarce. Commodore Lawrence M. Nagle determined that the club should be saved and proceeded to purchase at his own expense all of the large planks from the Old Boston Store which was being dismantled. These were brought to the club, and Jerry Johnson and Joe Meisel were hired to rebuild [the] porch and docks. Mr. Nagle also paid these men, since there was no money in the Club treasury.

The membership roster was severely reduced, and "members dropped like flies." At the Annual Meeting of 1932, membership and morale were so low that only 12 people showed up. They met in the upstairs Dining Room, where there was a fireplace, so that they would not have to fire up the boiler.

Low membership was only one problem. Lake Erie was at one of its lowest levels ever. The water in 1931, according to Loesel, was "as low as a snake's belly". It was the determined intervention of the Harbor Commission and the Commonwealth of Pennsylvania to save yachting in the bay, which led to the state - "at its own expense" - to deepen the channel leading to the boat cranes.

Despite the literal and figurative low water, the Erie Yacht Club survived. Club members were among the founding fathers of the Erie Chapter of the Power Squadron. Races and regattas still went on, and social events were revived by the end of the decade as a measure of economic stability came to the club. These activities continued until the United Statesbecame involved in World War II on December 7, 1941.

The war slowed, but did not stop, Club activities. Gas rationing placed a particular burden on power-boat owners who could not get fuel for pleasure craft, which were deemed to be "non-essential" to the war effort. Most owners laid up their boats "for the duration", although a number of power boat owners volunteered themselves and their boats for the local Coast Guard Auxiliary Flotilla.

Sailboats took advantage of the non-rationed zephyrs. Although a number of sailboat races were cancelled because of lack of crew, many of the small boat races were held because the younger sailors were too young for the draft which sent members to war in both the European and Pacific theaters. The war ended in 1945, the same year that the Erie Yacht Club celebrated "a half Century of sport, achievement, and good fellowship in the glorious tradition of YACHTING!"

== Recovery ==
The post-war period brought boom times to the Erie Yacht Club. The war had kept plans for membership and improvements on hold. Membership expanded dramatically, but low yearly budgets meant that improvements were minor and upgrading was piecemeal. The gas tank was painted blue and white, a concrete foundation along with steps was added to the Clubhouse, new lamp posts, new faucets in the lavatories and telephone lines to the west dock all marked progress. In addition, the basins were deepened and docks increased in number, so that 1954 could accommodate 200 boats. New catwalks were installed with all wooden docks replaced by 1955. But, the Clubhouse was jury-rigged and replacements were beginning to show wear. Despite paint and polish, the situation was becoming critical.

But, adversity had a bright side. On Memorial Day, 1953, a "Monsoon Flood" disrupted Opening Day ceremonies which were underway. The sewer viaduct, which crosses the road halfway up the ravine road, broke without warning sending tons of mud and debris down the road and into the parking lot. Those at the club were trapped by the mudslide. Some left by boat, but many seized the opportunity as a perfect excuse for an extended Club party. It was two days before cars could get up the hill.

== Growth ==
By 1954, Club growth was such that the basins were deepened and docks increased in number so that 200 boats could be accommodated. The Clubhouse was renovated and plans were initiated for the building of another Clubhouse and rearrangement of Club grounds. At this time, a master plan was developed for future facilities, as the club had grown beyond the size, which permitted piecemeal decisions. The docks were expanded in 1959 and again in 1965. In 1967, plans were finalized and fund-raising began for the new Clubhouse. Commodore William Ambro and the Bridge Officers conducted the groundbreaking ceremonies in January 1968, marking a new chapter for the Erie Yacht Club. Dedication of the new Clubhouse was held on October 5, 1968, with lavish festivities presided over by the master of dedication, the Honorable Raymond Shafer, Governor of Pennsylvania.

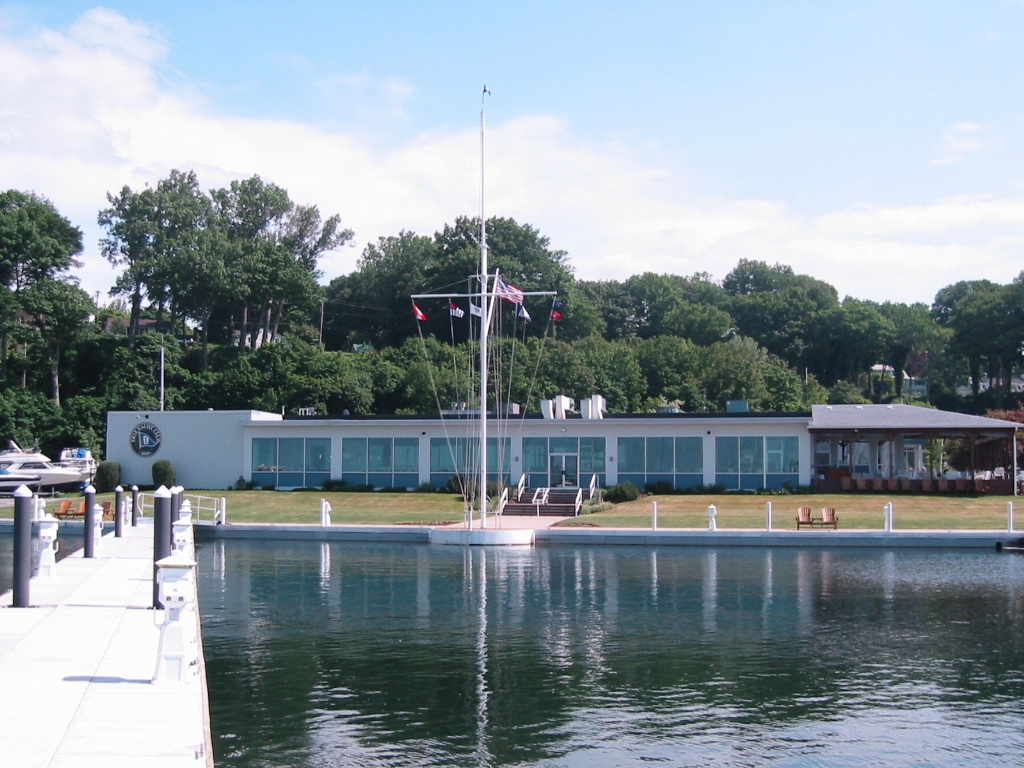
Clubhouse 2009

Following the master plan, fill was obtained and new docks were built, which increased the basin area to triple that in use previously. New slips with steel catwalks were added, bulkheads secured the dock fill and additional boat-handling facilities were added. As of 1999, the basin capacity was approximately 400 boats.

In July 1978, Commodore Richard Waller presided over a Mortgage Burning Celebration attended by an enthusiastic membership. The next year, the club was given a long-overdue remodeling necessitated by the "bare bones" approach taken in building the new Clubhouse. For the Bridge and Board, however, major expenditures were strictly watched because of the shadow of uncertainty surrounding the title to the land.

Efforts to acquire the land involved long, painstaking negotiations. The sale was discussed in 1979, and again in 1980 with the Erie-Western Pennsylvania Port Authority. The issue was a crucial one for future Club development, as the EYC had signed a fifty-year lease with the Erie-Western Pennsylvania Port Authority in 1963. Negotiations continued from 1979 to 1985 with no progress reported, and the club was "in a limbo situation until [it received] a forthcoming response." The Long-Range Planning Committee kept the focus on the land as the "first priority" and the Bridge and Board worked to effect a solution.

== Ownership ==
After the 1985 Annual Meeting, newly elected Rear Commodore G. "Gib" Loesel approached Commodore James Owen about his "contact" in City Hall, as his partner was advising Mayor Louis J. Tullio on insurance matters. Owen and Loesel negotiated with the Mayor and struck a deal for the purchase at a price of $550,000. At the May 24, 1986, Special Meeting, the membership voted 272–1 to purchase the property. Because of a lawsuit inaugurated by a member of City Council, the property closing was held up until February 9, 1987, at which time Commodore M. Roy Strausbaugh acquired the title on behalf of the EYC.

With ownership came a new master plan, which required major changes to the Clubhouse and to the yacht basin. The plan was defeated at a special membership meeting in 1991. In 1992, Commodore Robert H. Allshouse and his Bridge presented a modified plan, which called for major renovations to the Clubhouse only. The grill room used for casual dining was expanded to include a non-smoking lower level, the addition of a 45-seat private dining room named after our first commodore, George Bliss and a ballroom that accommodates 175. The plan was ratified by the membership and construction started in the winter of 1993. The construction went smoothly with the club closed for only 4 weeks. Commodore Ronald Busse dedicated the newly renovated Clubhouse in the spring of 1993.

== Centennial ==
With the 100th anniversary of the club on the horizon in 1995, Commodore Allshouse appointed Fleet Captain John Ashby as chairman of the newly created Centennial Committee, with the assignment to raise money for and plan all of the centennial events.

The Centennial year started off with a bang, opening with a weekend Winter Carnival, which concluded with a fireworks display, designed specifically for the club and its celebration of 100 years. In May, the club had its official Centennial Ball. Due to the anticipated attendance, the gala was held in Rainbow Gardens rather than the Clubhouse. This evening of continuous entertainment and music was a formal event attended by more than 500 members and guests.

During the summer, the Club held the largest-ever Family Picnic, bringing hundreds of families together for a day full of fun. Another jumbo event of the summer was the club's raft-up. Staged immediately to the north of the basin, members circled their boats around floats "EYC" & "100". As no centennial celebration would have been complete without stories of the past, an Old Timers' Night was scheduled to professionally record and preserve the oral history and traditions of the EYC. This well-attended event allowed younger members to hear "sea stories" of the old (and not so old) days.

In the fall, the Centennial Committee arranged for first-ever Oktoberfest. This event proved to be so popular that it has now become an annual Club event. The year concluded with the burying of a time capsule, in the "round about" located just inside the Club gates. This capsule will be opened at the 200th anniversary celebrations of the club.

To this day the Erie Yacht Club continues the traditions set forth by the club's founding members to promote, encourage and develop activities associated with yachting and yachting activities. With a roster of over 1,300 members, the Erie Yacht Club is one of the largest and oldest privately owned clubs on the Great Lakes.

== Reciprocity ==
Like most yacht clubs on the Lake Erie, the Erie Yacht Club is a member of the Inter-Lake Yachting Association, which provides reciprocal privileges between members of many other yacht clubs. The Erie Yacht Club has reciprocal relationships with most accredited yacht clubs and is happy to host their visiting members. When reciprocal members wish to visit the club, they must show their membership card from their Club which confirms that they are a member in good standing and are eligible to be granted guest privileges. The Erie Yacht Club is also a member of the Yachting Club of America and offers reciprocity with their members as well.

== Past Commodores ==
- 1895-1903 George T. Bliss
- 1904-05 William L. Morrison
- 1906-07 Albert MacDonald
- 1908-10 George T. Bliss
- 1911-12 William S. Foster
- 1913 George T. Bliss
- 1914 Carl E. Reichel
- 1915-16 Oscar H. Nick
- 1917-19 Henri G. Chatain
- 1920-21 Edward H. Scott
- 1922 Lawrence Nagle
- 1923 George F. Hall
- 1924-25 Henry B. Vincent
- 1926 John R. Metcalf
- 1927 William H. Supplee
- 1928 Henry B. Vincent
- 1929 Lawrence Nagle
- 1930-31 Guy C. Boughton
- 1932-33 Robert S. Van Cleve
- 1934 Charles H. Eastman
- 1935-36 Horace Platt
- 1937 Donald S. Sterrett
- 1938 Orson J. Graham
- 1939 Morril A. Bauman
- 1940-41 Eben J. Gunnison
- 1942-43 Norman A. Parker
- 1944 Andrew G. Shafer
- 1945 Richard B. Schlaudecker
- 1946 Clarence M. Krug
- 1947 Robert W. Parker
- 1948 Durker W. Braggins
- 1949 Robert N. Yates
- 1950 Norman J. Grode
- 1951 Robert Y. Bums
- 1952 Uras A. Dietly
- 1953 Roy L. Irwin
- 1954 Forman H. Craton
- 1955 T. Kenneth Welsh
- 1956 Donald E. Smith
- 1957 John D. Clemens
- 1958 William E. Walker
- 1959 Douglas B. Nagle
- 1960 Ralph E. Colclesser
- 1961 Frank W. Zurn
- 1962 Robert C. Dodsworth
- 1963 Gordon S. Altman
- 1964 Robert B. Way
- 1965 J. Douglas James
- 1966 Arthur S. Boldt
- 1967 Benjamin J. Ginader
- 1968 G. William Ambro
- 1969 George Deike, Jr
- 1970 Richard 0. Loesel
- 1971 George H. Sipple
- 1972 Fritz Busse, Jr
- 1973 Robert F. Painter
- 1974 Wendell R. Good
- 1975 Richard H. Amthor
- 1976 Richard J. Gorny
- 1977 David B. Schuler
- 1978 Richard E. Waller
- 1979 Gustave Neuss, Jr
- 1980 Clemens V. Schwab
- 1981 J. Roy Martine
- 1982 Clarke S. Bressler
- 1983 Robert L. Lasher
- 1984 Donald E. Sheeran
- 1985 William J. Behr
- 1986 James L. Owen
- 1987 M. Roy Strausbaugh
- 1988 G."Gib" Loesel
- 1989 Douglas B. Nagle III
- 1990 Harold J. Will
- 1991 Kerry J. Schwab
- 1992 Robert H. Allshouse
- 1993 Ronald E. Busse
- 1994 William C. Lasher
- 1995 John G. Ashby
- 1996 John W. Bierley
- 1997 Christian C. Wolford
- 1998 Fritz Curtze
- 1999 Peter Gorny
- 2000 Patrick K. Geary
- 2001 Richard V. Roberston Jr.
- 2002 James R. Lockwood
- 2002 Richard V. Robertson Jr.
- 2003 Peter Traphegan
- 2004 Andrew Hanks
- 2005 Richard P. Vicary
- 2006 James Means
- 2007 John Murosky
- 2008 David Arthurs
- 2009 David Amatangelo
- 2010 Thomas Trost
- 2011 Gerry Urbaniak
- 2012 David Heitzenrater
- 2013 Matthew L. Niemic
- 2014 Edward J. Schuler
- 2015 Bradley K. Enterline
- 2016 John M. Orlando
- 2017 David J. Haller
- 2018 Gregory R. Gorny
- 2019 William Gloekler
- 2020 Peter S. Lund, M.D.
- 2021 Vincent Cifelli
- 2022 David Sanner
- 2023 Harvey Downey
- 2024 Michael Squeglia
- 2025 Russell Thompson
- 2026 Matthew Wolford
