= John Dos Passos bibliography =

List of works by or about John Dos Passos, American author.

== Novels ==
- One Man's Initiation: 1917 (1920). Reprinted in 1945, under the title First Encounter
- Three Soldiers (1921)
- Streets of Night (1923)
- Manhattan Transfer (1925)
- U.S.A. (1938). Three-volume set includes
  - The 42nd Parallel (1930)
  - Nineteen Nineteen (1932)
  - The Big Money (1936)
- District of Columbia (1952). Three-volume set includes
  - Adventures of a Young Man (1939)
  - Number One (1943)
  - The Grand Design (1949)
- Chosen Country (1951)
- Most Likely to Succeed (1954)
- The Great Days (1958)
- Midcentury (1961)
- Century's Ebb: The Thirteenth Chronicle (1970) —incomplete

== Non-fiction ==
- Rosinante to the Road Again (1922)
- Facing the Chair (1927)
- Orient Express (1927)
- Journeys between Wars (1938)
- The Ground We Stand On (1941)
- State of the Nation (1944)
- Tour of Duty (1946)
- "Art and Isadora" (reissued 1953)
- The Head and Heart of Thomas Jefferson (1954)
- The Theme Is Freedom (1956)
- The Men Who Made the Nation (1957)
- Prospects of a Golden Age (1959)
- Mr. Wilson's War (1962)
- Brazil on the Move (1963)
- The Best Times: An Informal Memoir (1966)
- The Shackles of Power (1966)
- World in a Glass – A View of Our Century From the Novels of John Dos Passos (1966)
- The Portugal Story (1969)
- Easter Island: Island of Enigmas (1970)
- Travel Books & Other Writings 1916–1941: Rosinante to the Road Again; Orient Express; In All Countries; A Pushcart to the Curb; Essays, Letters, Diaries (Townsend Ludington, ed.) (Library of America, 2003) ISBN 978-1-931082-40-2
- Lettres à Germaine Lucas Championnière (2007) – only in French

== Poetry ==
Collections

- A Pushcart at the Curb (1922)

== Plays ==
- The Garbage Man: a Parade with Shouting (New York: Harper & Brothers, 1926)
