= Stephen Koch (writer) =

American author and academic (1941–2026)

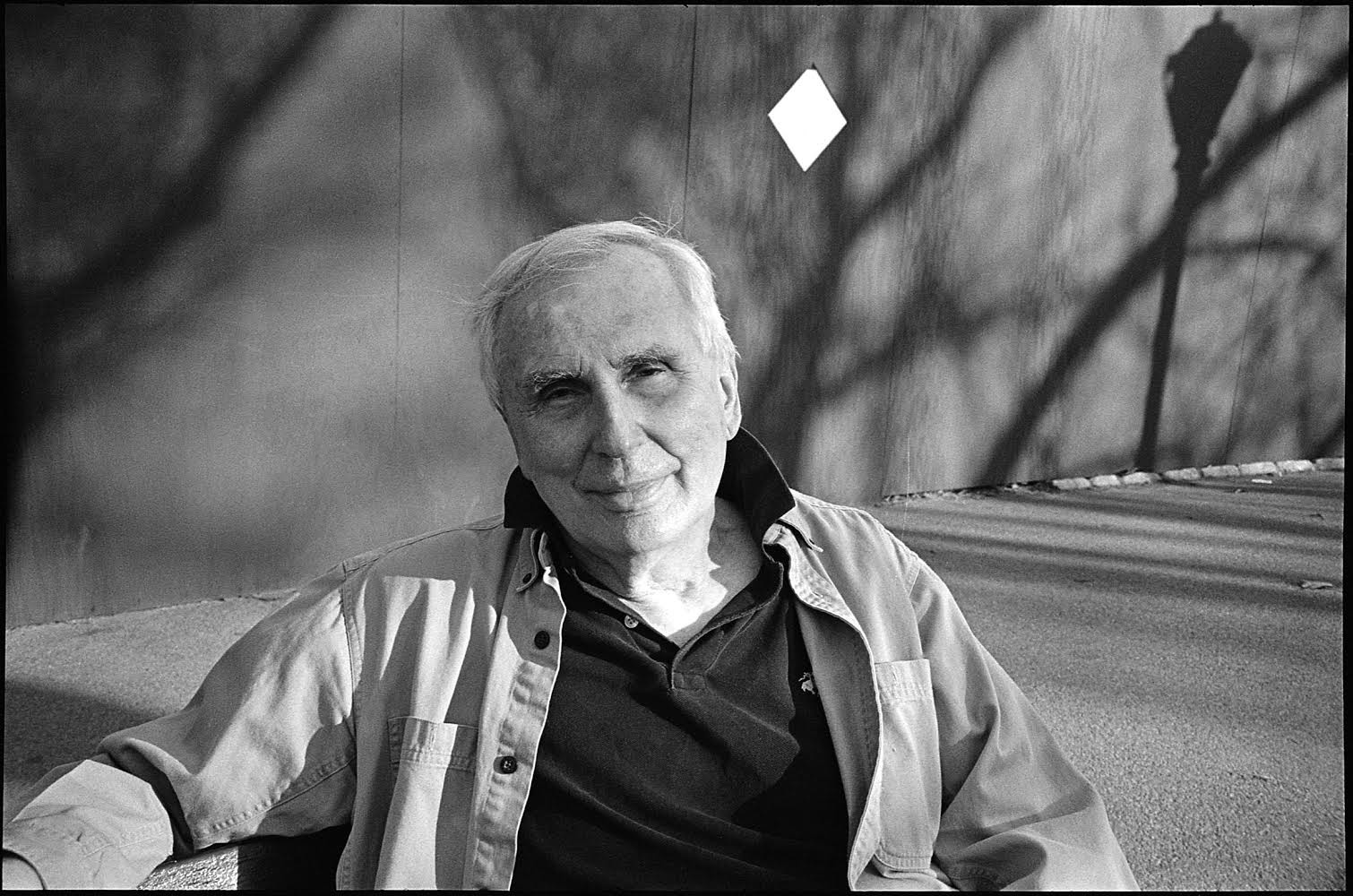
- Born: Stephen Bayard Koch; May 8, 1941; Saint Paul, Minnesota, U.S.
- Died: February 24, 2026 (aged 84); New York City, U.S.
- Education: University of Minnesota; City College of New York; Columbia University
- Spouses: Sheila Shulman (m. 1960; div. 1965) Frances Cohen (m. 1987; died 2021)
- Children: 1
- Writing career
- Years active: 1964–2026

Stephen Bayard Koch (May 8, 1941 – February 24, 2026) was an American novelist, essayist, historian, and teacher. He penned numerous books of cultural history, two novels, and a classic study of the work of Andy Warhol.

Koch taught creative writing at both the undergraduate and graduate levels at Columbia University and Princeton University. He was also the author of a handbook for writers, The Modern Library Writer's Workshop.

== Early life and education ==
Koch was born in Saint Paul, Minnesota, on May 8, 1941, though he spent his childhood in Northfield, Minnesota. His father was a lawyer. His father died in 1951, when Koch was ten, and he grew up in a middle-class home with his mother, Edith Koch; his brother, the physicist Frederick Koch, and his maternal grandmother, Emma Pilling Bayard, a daughter of midwestern pioneers, who died at an advanced age when Koch was 16.

After attendance in the local schools, where his prime enthusiasm was the theater, Koch entered the University of Minnesota, studying comparative literature. After one year, he moved to New York City, where he had dreamt of living since childhood. He earned his living in various menial positions at the New York Public Library, and more glamorously, as an assistant to the managing clerk of the prominent white-shoe law firm Lord, Day, and Lord.

In 1960, Koch married for the first time, and in 1963 earned his bachelor's degree at the City College of New York. At City College, he studied literature, not because he wished to become an academic, but because he hoped knowledge of literature would serve his ambition to be a writer. At City College, he was awarded what he regarded as the greatest honor of his life, when he was named the most promising future law student in his graduating class. Nonetheless, because of his primary vocation to be a writer, he decided against law school, and instead pursued graduate studies at Columbia University.

== Literary career ==
Dissatisfied with graduate school, Koch began to write reviews and literary essays which, in 1965, came to the attention of the then-rising literary star, Susan Sontag, and he became for the next several years, Sontag's protégé. He dropped graduate study, and his criticism was regularly published in magazines such as The New Republic, Partisan Review, The Nation, Tri-Quarterly, The New York Times Book Review, and many others. In 1966, he became an instructor in the department of English at the State University of New York at Stony Brook. In 1969, he completed his first novel, Night Watch, which was published by Harper and Row to generally strong positive critical response both in print and the media.

In 1971, Koch became the writer and on-camera host of the ten-part PBS series on art: Eye-to-Eye. In the same year, he also wrote his book on the films of Andy Warhol, Stargazer, which has remained in print for over fifty years. After that, he became a regular contributor to various magazines, notably Harper's and Esquire, where during the first wave of feminism, he published a widely noticed essay "The Guilty Sex". His relation with Harper’s Magazine ended when the editor refused to publish his enthusiastic essay about Robert Wilson and Philip Glass’ avant-garde opera Einstein on the Beach.

In 1977, despite his reluctance to become an academic, Koch became a fiction workshop leader at Columbia University’s MFA program in the School of the Arts. In 1978, he became an instructor in the undergraduate fiction writing program at Princeton University, where he continued to teach for seven years. He used his experience as a mentor to creative writers to produce the widely recognized handbook, The Modern Library Writer's Workshop. He remained at Columbia until 1991, by which time he had been, for several years, chairman of the program. A number of his former students at both universities have gone onto distinguished careers in literature and the theater.

In 1986, Koch published The Bachelor's Bride, a novel about the life and violent death of an art star of the 1960s and 70s. By a strange fluke, in the last interview given before his death, Andy Warhol mentioned that he wanted to make a movie based on this novel.

From the late 1980s into the mid-1990s, Koch wrote about twentieth century cultural history and wrote books of nonfiction: Double Lives: Stalin, Willi Munzenberg and the Seduction of the Intellectuals and The Breaking Point: Hemingway, Dos Passos and the Murder of Jose Robles. Later, because of his longstanding interest in the forces that led to German fascism and the Second World War, he published Hitler's Pawn: The Boy Assassin and the Holocaust, the story of the obscure Jewish teenager in Paris whose assassination of a German diplomat was used by Adolf Hitler as a pretext for Kristallnacht, a turning point in the Nazis' persecution of the Jews and prelude to the Holocaust.

== Personal life and death ==
Koch was married twice: from 1960 to 1965 to Sheila Shulman; and to Frances Cohen, MD, from 1987 until her death in 2021. He had one daughter, Angelica Madeline Koch, born in 1994. Koch was bisexual and had significant liaisons with both men and women.

Stephen Koch died from a heart attack in Manhattan, New York City, on February 24, 2026, at the age of 84.

== Peter Hujar ==
Shortly before he died from AIDS-related complications in 1987, photographer Peter Hujar named Koch as the executor of his artistic estate. Thereafter, Koch worked to usher Hujar's work out of a cult following into what he regarded as its rightful prominence in 20th century art. In the April 2018 issue of Harper's Magazine, Koch published an essay titled "The Pictures" describing these efforts.

In 2017, a retrospective of Hujar's work, curated at the Morgan Library & Museum in New York, travelled to major venues in the United States and Europe. By then, the critical consensus included Hujar among the great American photographers.

== Bibliography ==
Books:

- Hitler's Pawn: The Boy Assassin and the Holocaust San Francisco, Counterpoint Books. 2019.
- The Breaking Point: Hemingway, Dos Passos, and the Murder of Jose Robles. New York, Counterpoint, 2005. (Paperback 2006; printed in London by Robson Books, 2006). Translations: [Adieu a l’Amitie, Hemingway, Dos Passos et la Guerre d’Espagne. Paris, Editions Grasset et Fasquelle, 2005; La Ruptura: Hemingway, Dos Passos, y el Asesinato de Jose Robles. Barcelona, Galaxia Gutenberg: Circolo des Lectores. 2006.
- Double Lives: Stalin, Willi Münzenberg, and the Seduction of the Intellectuals. New York, Enigma Books, 2004. (Fully revised and updated edition)
- The Modern Library Writer's Workshop. New York, The Modern Library and Random House, 2003.
- The Bachelor's Bride. New York and London, Marion Boyars Inc., 1986. Translations: La Mariée des Célibataires. Paris: Stock, 1988; De Vrijgezellenbruid. Amsterdam: Meulenhoff, 1988; La Novia de los solteros. Barcelona: Editorial Anagrama, 1989.
- Andy Warhol: Photographs. New York, Robert Miller Gallery, 1986.
- Stargazer: Andy Warhol's World and His Films. New York, Praeger, 1986. (Printed in UK by Calder and Boyars, 1974. Second Revised and Expanded USA and UK Edition in 1985 by Marion Boyars. Third USA and UK Edition in 1990, revised with a new introductory chapter). Translations: Hyperstar. Paris: Éditions du Chêne.
- Night Watch. New York, Harper and Row, 1970. (Second printing by Calder and Boyers, 1971. Paperback by Harper and Row, 1973; Trade, 1975). Translations: Les Yeux de la Nuit. Paris: Editions Buchet/Chastel, 1971; Nachtwacke. Amsterdam: Mullenhof, 1973; Guardia Nocturna. Caracas: Monte Avila Editores, 1980.

Essays:

- "Guilt, Grace and Robert Mapplethorpe" (Art in America, November 1986).
- "Caravaggio and the Unseen" (Antaeus, 1986).
- "The Secret Kafka" (The New Criterion, January 1984), translated into French as "Kafka Secret" (L'Infini, Autumn 1985).
- "The Spirit of Soho" (Esquire, April 1975).
- "The Guilty Sex: Man and Feminism" (Esquire, 1975).
