= 42nd parallel =

42nd parallel may refer to:

- 42nd parallel north, a circle of latitude in the Northern Hemisphere
- 42nd parallel south, a circle of latitude in the Southern Hemisphere
- The 42nd Parallel, a 1930 novel by John Dos Passos in his U.S.A. trilogy
