= Great Allentown Fair =

Annual fair and agricultural show in Allentown, Pennsylvania

- Genre: Agricultural
- Dates: Annually in late August and early September (September 2 to September 7 in 2026)
- Locations: Allentown Fairgrounds, 302 N. 17th St., Allentown, Pennsylvania, U.S.
- Years active: 1852–1861, 1863–1916, 1919–41, 1946–2019, 2021–
- Website: http://www.allentownfairpa.org/

The Great Allentown Fair is an annual fair and agricultural show that is held at the Allentown Fairgrounds in Allentown, Pennsylvania. It is operated by the Lehigh County Agricultural Society. It is one of the oldest fairs in the United States, and one of the largest in the state of Pennsylvania.

The fair was first held in 1852 to showcase agricultural advancements and to entertain patrons. It has since evolved to appeal to a broader audience, adding more entertainment and dining options. Although it stays true to its agricultural roots by offering petting zoos, livestock judging contests, and a farmer's market, the modern-day fair focuses more on entertainment; it boasts a carnival, talent shows, and concerts.

== History ==
=== 19th century ===
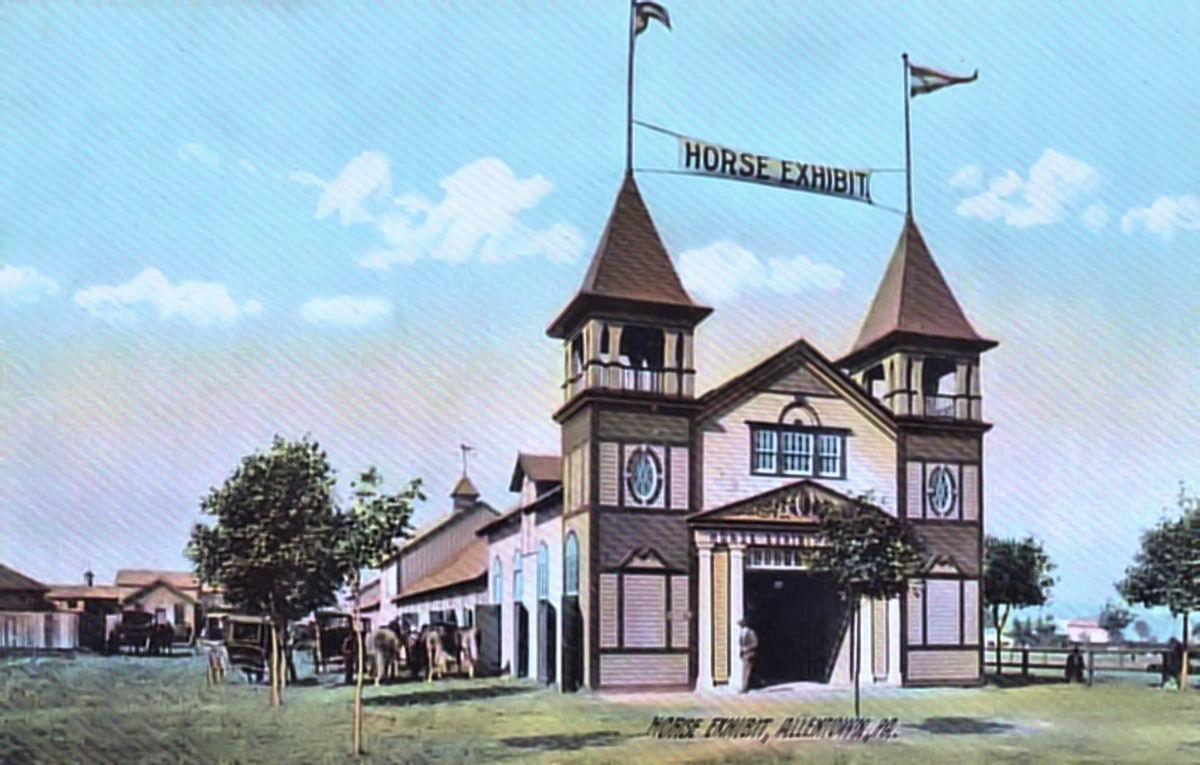
Postcard of Horse Exhibit Hall at the Great Allentown Fair at the Allentown Fairgrounds in 1909

The Lehigh County Agricultural Society hosted the first fair from October 6 to October 8, 1852, on Livingston's Lawn, a 5-acre (20,000 m^{2}) plot located east of Fourth Street, between Walnut and Union Streets, in Allentown. The first fair in 1852 was so successful that the following year, in 1853, the Lehigh County Agricultural Society purchased a larger plot of land, north of Liberty Street between Fifth and Sixth Streets, on which ticket offices and a two-story exhibition hall were built. This location was the site of the second fair, held from September 28 to September 30, 1853. One of the most popular attractions of these early fairs was Stephen Lentz's Flying Coach, a brass band that performed atop a hay wagon.

In 1862, there was no fair due to the Civil War. During the Civil War, the fairgrounds was used as a staging site for the 176th Regiment of Pennsylvania Volunteers. The fair resumed in 1863. In 1876, in celebration of the 100th anniversary of the signing of the Declaration of Independence, a large reenactment of the Battle of Bunker Hill was held, which included many of Lehigh County's Civil War regiments and veterans as participants.

Throughout the 1870s and 1880s, the popularity of the Allentown Fair continued to grow, outgrowing the fairground's size, facilities, short race track, and small grandstand. In 1889, the Lehigh County Agricultural Society purchased a plot of land on 17th Street between Chew and Liberty Streets, to serve as the new fairgrounds. One of the primary features of the new location was a new half-mile race track, with grandstands capable of seating 2,500. In celebration of the opening of the new fairgrounds, the fair was renamed the "Great Allentown Fair."

=== 20th century ===
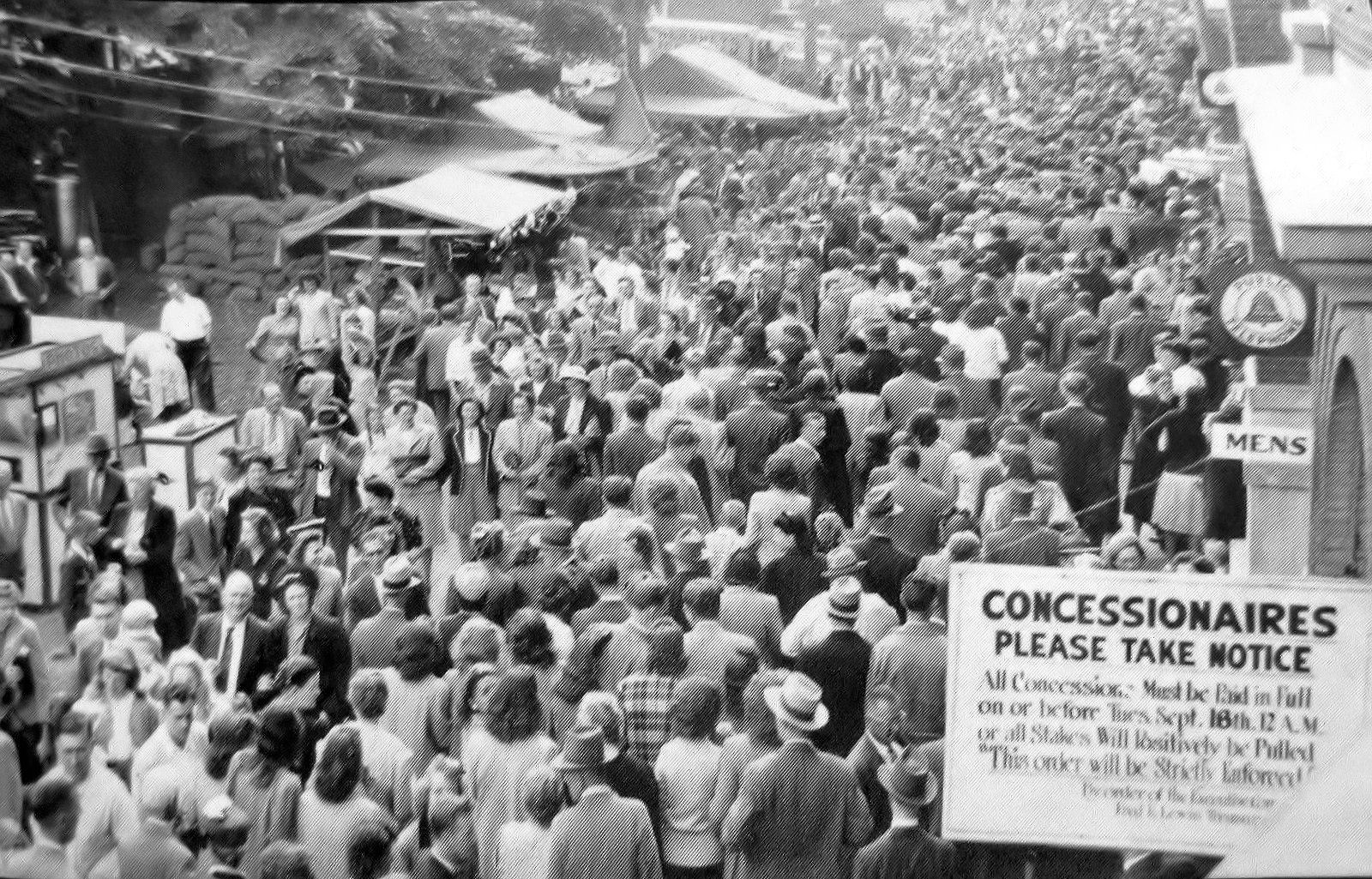
The Great Allentown Fair in 1941

From its earliest days in the 19th century, horse racing was a popular event at the Allentown Fair. In 1902, the Allentown Fairgrounds' half-mile track was regarded as "one of the finest in the country." At the Great Allentown Fair in 1905, racehorse Dan Patch set a record of 2:01 on the half-mile track. In 1911, the present-day grandstand was built at the Allentown Fairgrounds, increasing the overall seating capacity from 2,500 to 10,000.

Between 1907 and 1914, airship races became a featured attraction at the fair. In 1909, two airships, one bearing the American flag and the other that of Germany, took off from the fairgrounds, raced down Hamilton Street, circled the Soldiers and Sailors Monument, and returned. The airship bearing the American flag won the race. The following year, in 1910, pilot Glenn Curtiss took off in his plane, using 19th Street as his runway, and flew over the Allentown Fair in what was the first known heavier-than-air flight in the Lehigh Valley.

In 1920, the first auto race was held at the fair. Sprint car races at the Great Allentown Fair were sanctioned by the American Automobile Association (until 1955), the United States Automobile Club (from 1956 to 1966), and the International Motor Contest Association (in 1967 and 1968). Sprint car legends Tommy Hinnershitz and Ira Vail both captured numerous wins on the half-mile dirt track, and Indianapolis 500 winners Mario Andretti, A. J. Foyt, and Parnelli Jones all raced at the Great Allentown Fair before going on to greater fame. In 1960, Johnny Thomson was killed during a race at the fair when his car crashed through the inside track fence. Although the last sanctioned auto race was held in 1968, demolition derbies continued to be popular event.

In 1917 and 1918, during World War I, the fair was not held due to war, and the fairground was transformed into Camp Crane, a training facility for the U.S. Ambulance Service. Over 20,000 soldiers lived in tents and barracks on the fairgrounds during World War I. The caretaker's house, which stood at 1701 Chew Street until demolished in 1960 to make room for a bank, was used as the officer's club.

Between 1942 and 1945, the fair was not held due to World War II. In 1951, Gen. Douglas MacArthur, his wife, and his son Arthur attended "Father and Son" day at the Great Allentown Fair, a visit described by local historian Frank Whelan as "probably among the most significant moments in the fair's history."

Beginning in the 1950s, musical concerts and performances began being held at the fair, and they began drawing major acts and large crowds. In 1958, Buddy Holly performed at the Great Allentown Fair.

In the 1960s, Roy Rogers and Lawrence Welk appeared at the fair. Also in the 1960s, Johnny Carson appeared at the fair along with touring version of Rowan & Martin's Laugh-In. In 1964, Andy Williams introduced the Osmond Brothers at the Great Allentown Fair. Also in 1964, Kate Smith made her first community fair performance at the Allentown Fair. In 1966, Herb Alpert and the Tijuana Brass headlined the fair; the back cover of their album S.R.O. features a photograph taken during their Great Allentown Fair performance.

On August 8, 1974, Liza Minnelli delayed her Great Allentown Fair concert while Richard Nixon's resignation speech was broadcast live over the fair's public address system. Her performance later that night broke box office records at the Allentown Fair.

=== 21st century ===
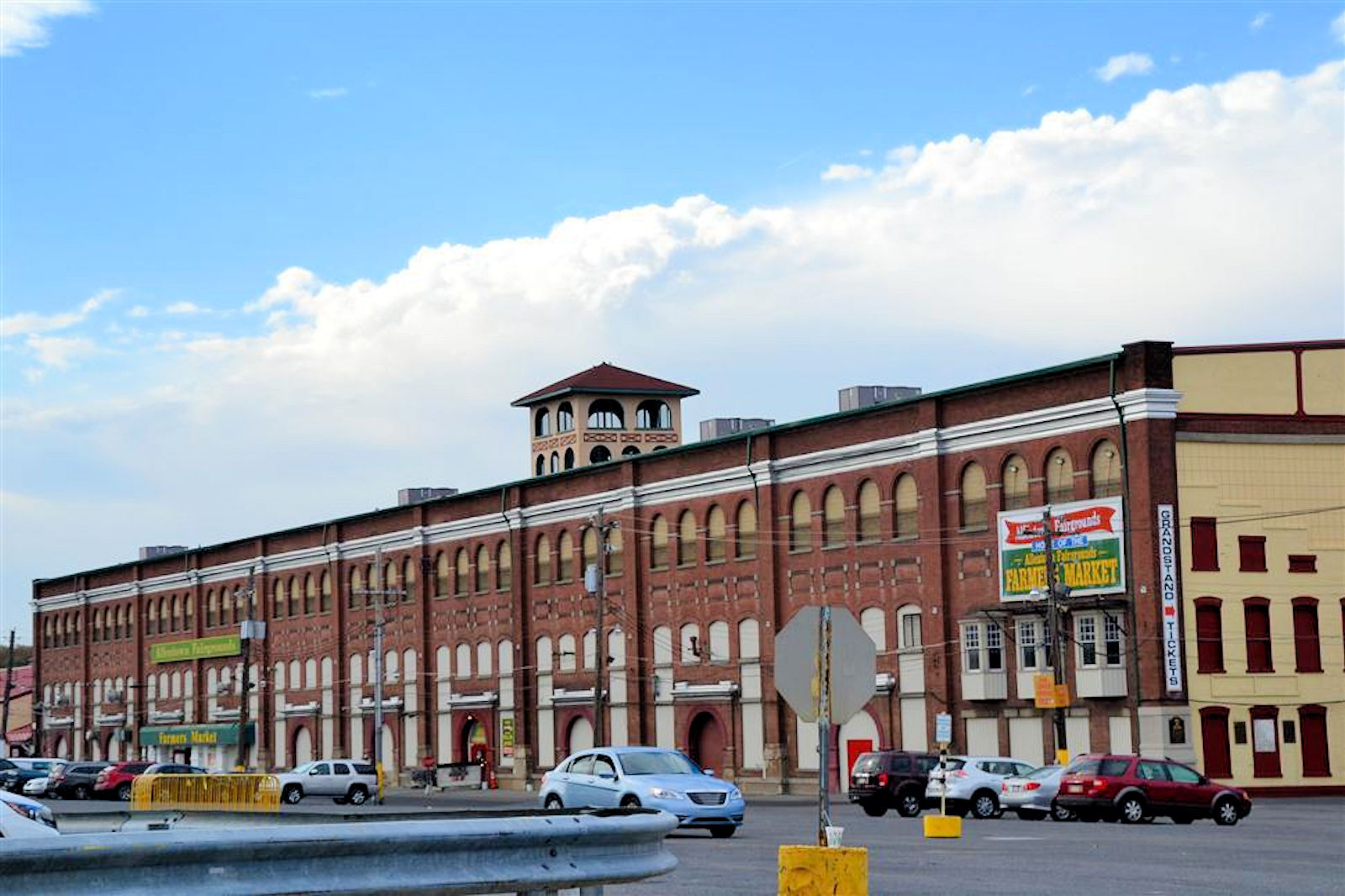
Allentown Fairgrounds Grandstand in 2018

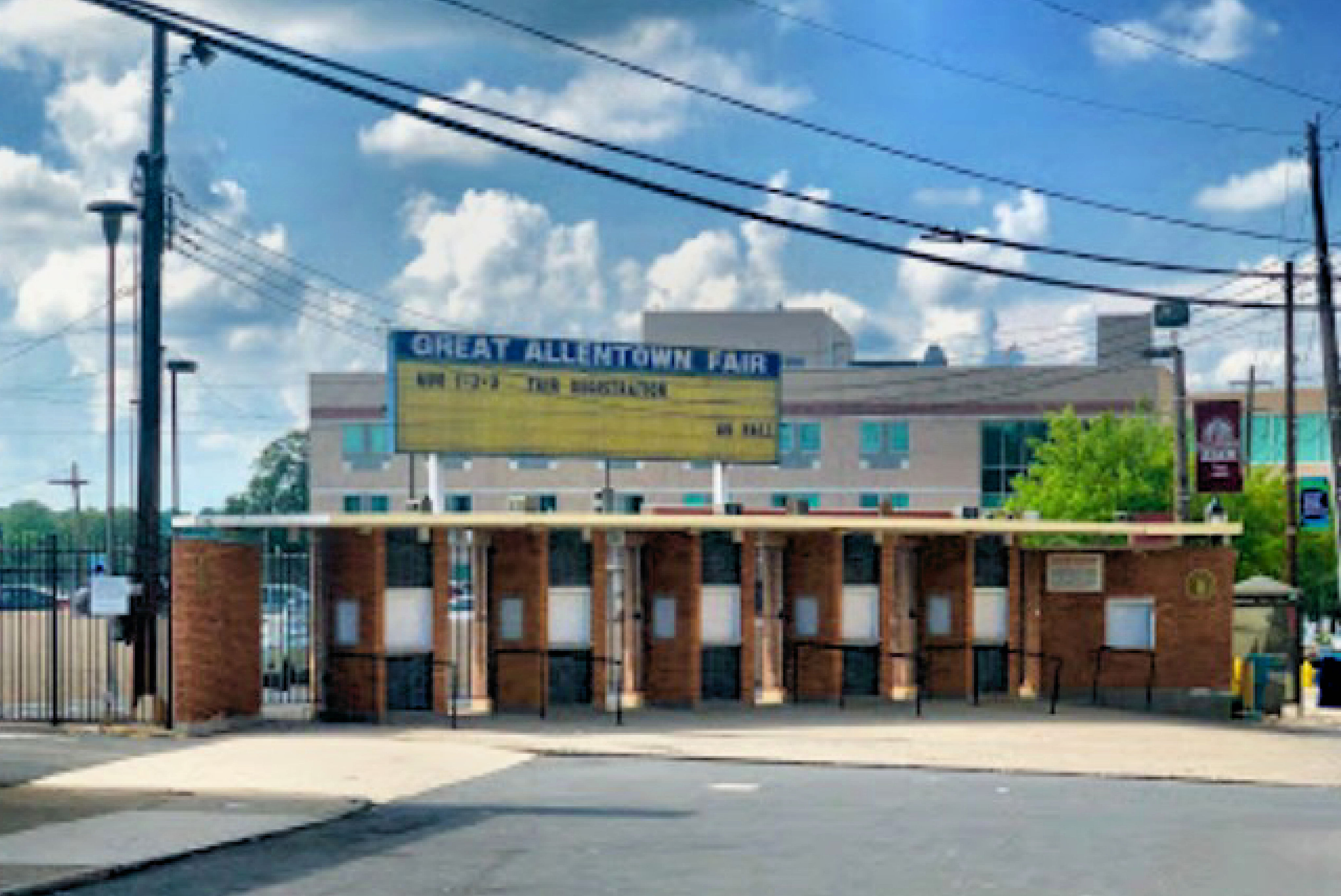
The main entrance to the Allentown Fairgrounds in 2019

In 2020, for the first time since World War II, the festival was cancelled due to COVID-19 pandemic. It returned in 2021.

== Attractions ==
Attractions at the Great Allentown Fair including:

- Agriplex/Agriland, the fair's agricultural-themed areas
- Grandstand, a large outdoor stage featuring the fair's headlining acts
- Farmerama Theater, an amphitheater where talent contests are held and assorted daytime entertainment takes place
- Main Entrance Plaza, an area where special shows, such as juggling acts, are held
- Music Tent, a tent where bands perform
- Powers Great American Midways, the fair's carnival

== Grandstand performances ==
In 1911, a 7,070 seat grandstand was constructed at a cost of $100,000 to host horse racing and auto racing.

In 1956, the grandstand was opened to major musician and band acts. Guy Lombardo was the first booked grandstand act.

== See also ==
- List of historic places in Allentown, Pennsylvania
