= Camp Crane =

US Army training camp in Pennsylvania

- Ambulance Station 555
- Part of Training Headquarters of the USAACS. United States Army Ambulance Corps, World War I
- Allentown, Pennsylvania
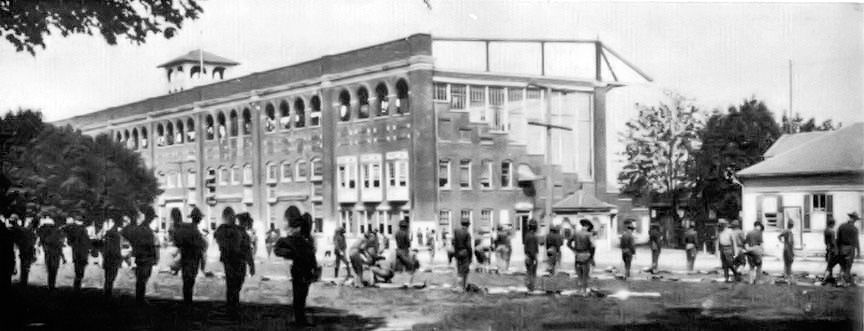
- Training exercise at Camp Crane in front of the Allentown Fairgrounds Grandstand. Offices located in the Grandstand became both the headquarters of Camp Crane and the USAAS.

Location
- Coordinates: 40°36′05″N 75°29′51″W

Site history
- In use: 17 May 1917 – 10 April 1919

Camp Crane was a World War I United States Army Ambulance Service (USAAS) training camp, located in Allentown, Pennsylvania. Its mission was to train ambulance drivers to evacuate casualties on the Western Front in France. It was named for Brigadier General Charles Henry Crane, surgeon general of the Army in 1882–83.

Today, the location of Camp Crane is used as the Allentown Fairgrounds

== History ==
=== Establishment ===
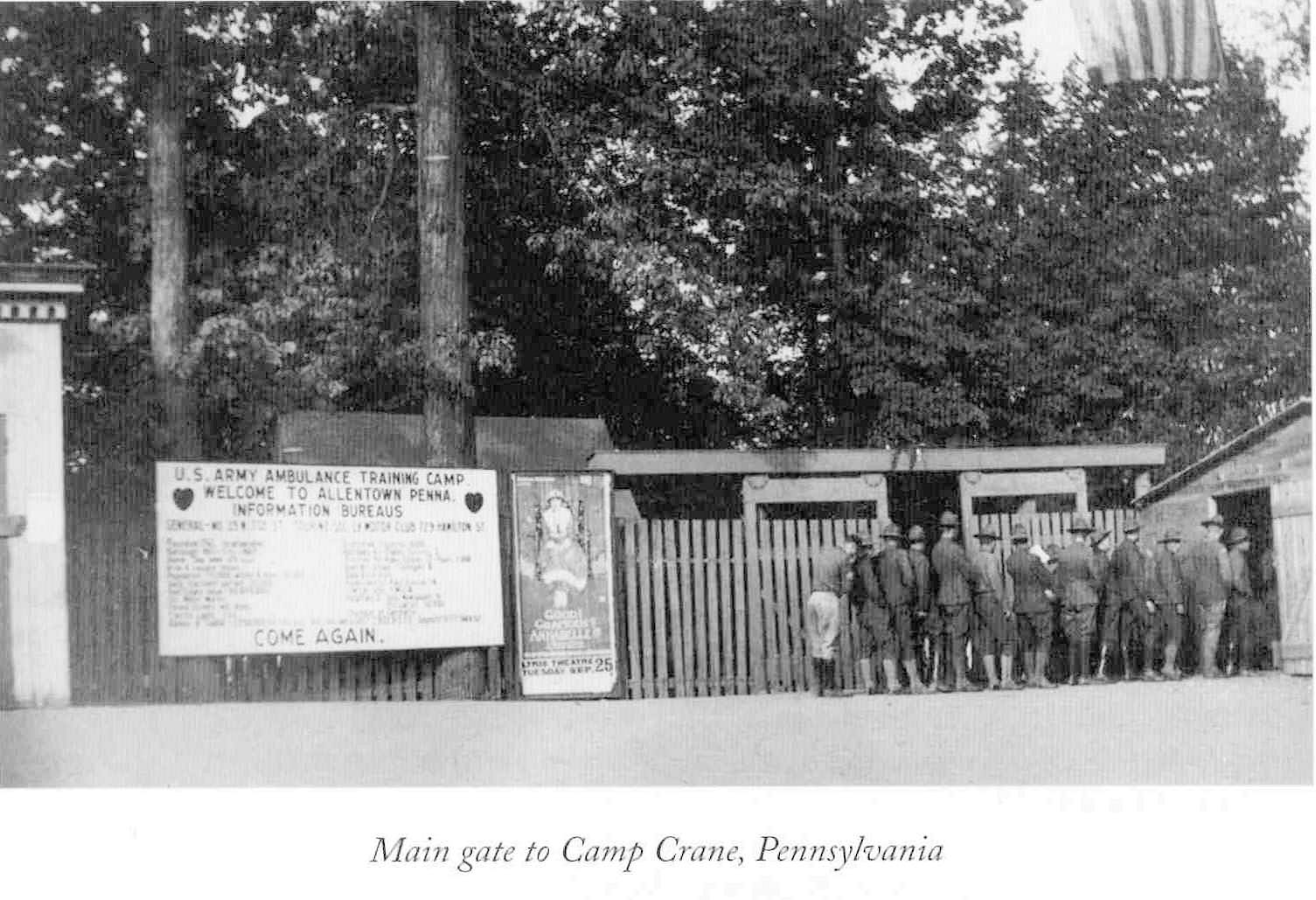
Main entrance to Camp Crane, converted from the Allentown Fairgrounds main gate, located at the northwest corner of 17th and Chew Street in Allentown, Pennsylvania

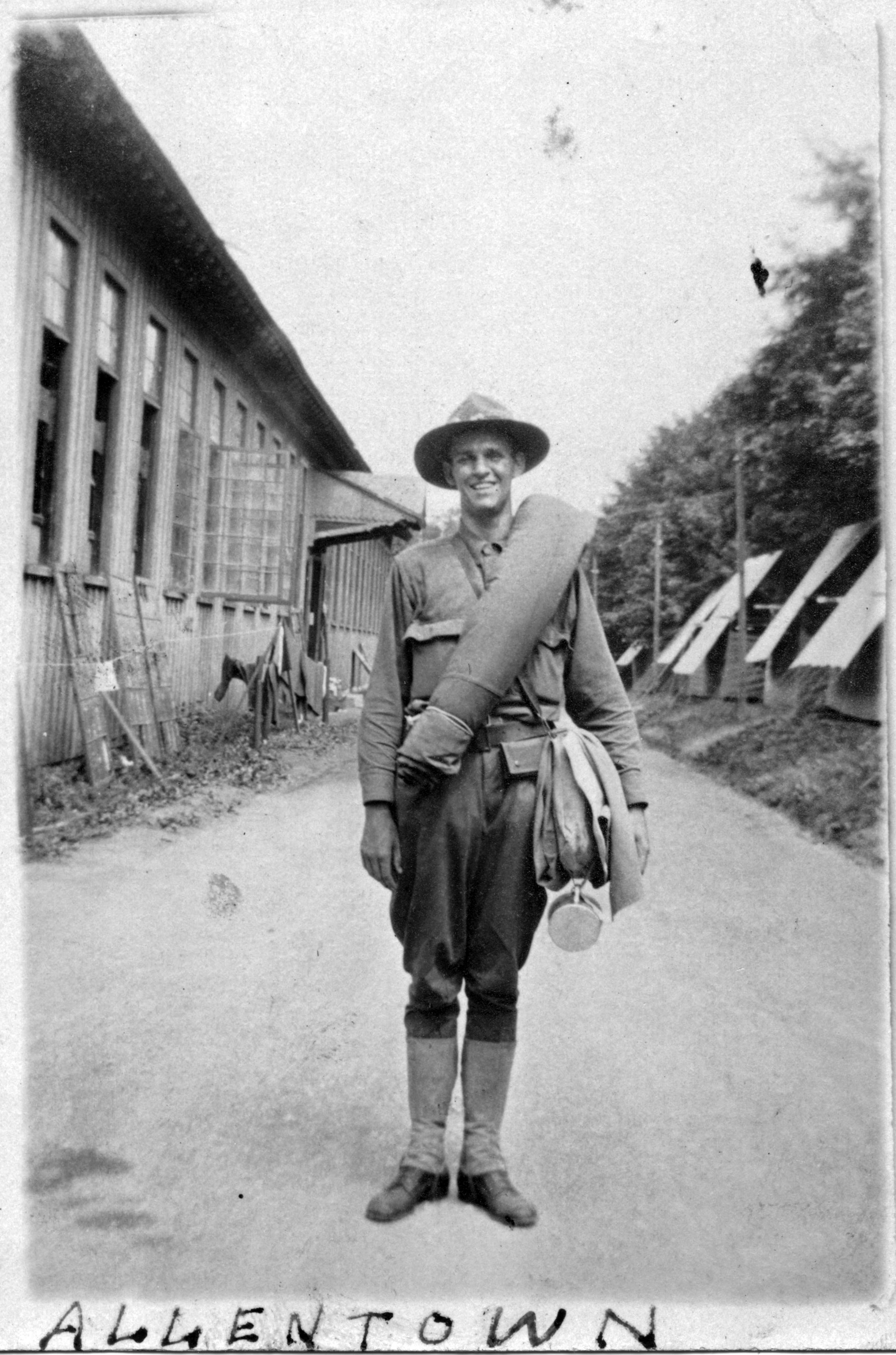
A fresh arrival at Camp Crane, 1917

When the United States entered World War I, the status of American volunteers in Europe became uncertain because they now had a U.S. military obligation to fulfill. France, fearing the loss of ambulance volunteers, requested that the United States ensure the uninterrupted continuation of the vital service. U.S. leaders thus agreed to incorporate American volunteer ambulance units into the American Army and to continue their service at the front with the French.

The Army organized a new ambulance corps for that purpose. War Department General Orders No. 75, which established the U.S. Army Ambulance Service (USAAS), was issued on 23 June 1917. However, even before that, beginning in mid-May, rumors of the Army being interested in establishing a training camp at the Allentown, Pennsylvania Fairgrounds began to circulate. The fairgrounds was established in 1889 by the Lehigh County Agricultural Society (LCAS) as a site to hold its annual fair and operated a farmer's market inside a large grandstand, built in 1908. The property, about 50 acres in size, also had a small horse racing track, stables and several exhibition halls.

The LCAS and representatives of the United States Army concluded an agreement for the Army to lease the fairgrounds, and as a result of that agreement, an announcement was made by the LCAS that the Allentown Fair would be cancelled in 1917. The Army assigned the fairgrounds to the USAAS and designated the site Camp Crane. It was named for Brigadier General Charles H. Crane, surgeon general from 1882 to 1883. Its mission was to train recruits as ambulance drivers, mechanics, orderlies and the other skills they would need on the Western Front. The also became the site of the USAAS headquarters.

=== Training ===
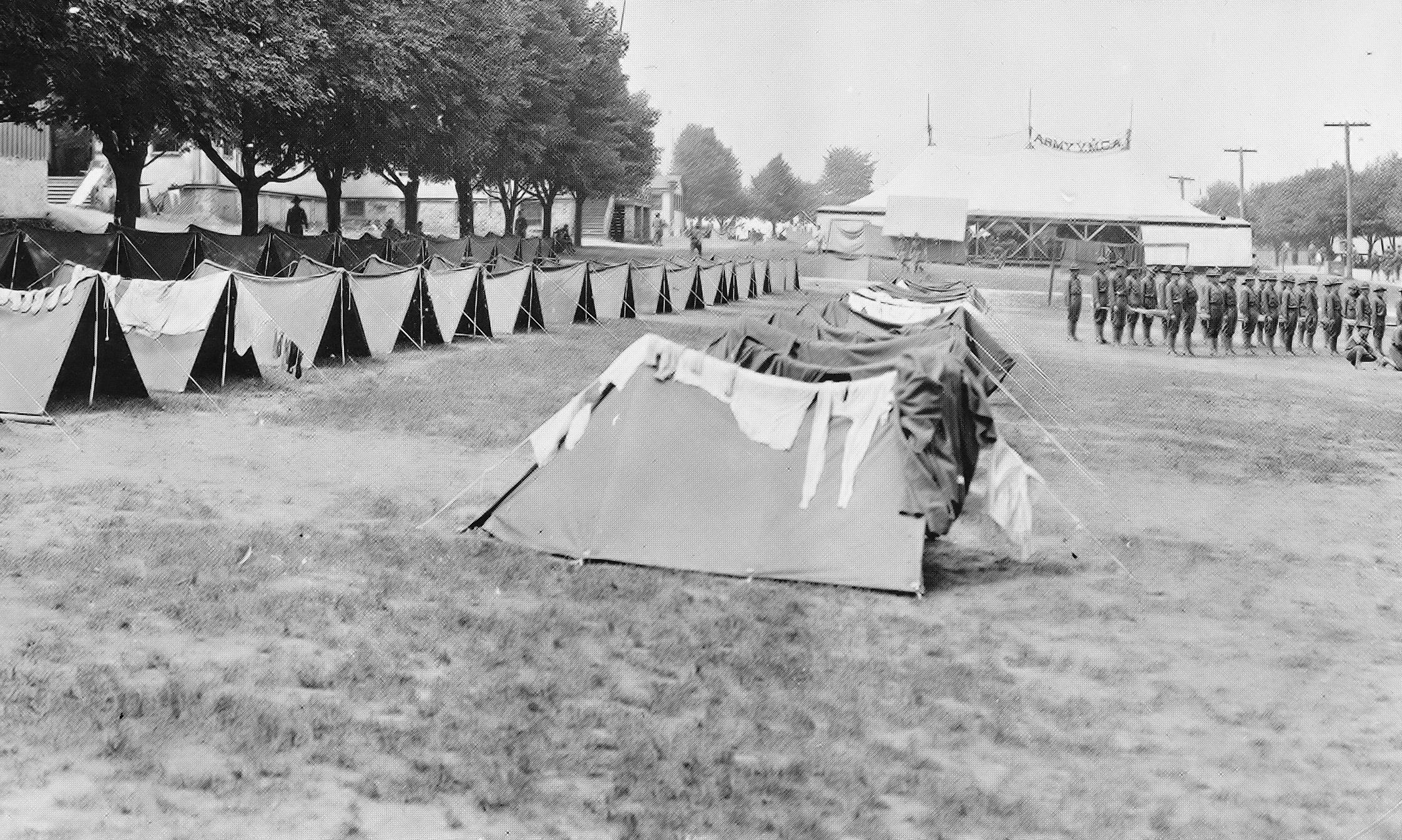
Pup tents at Camp Crane, Summer 1917

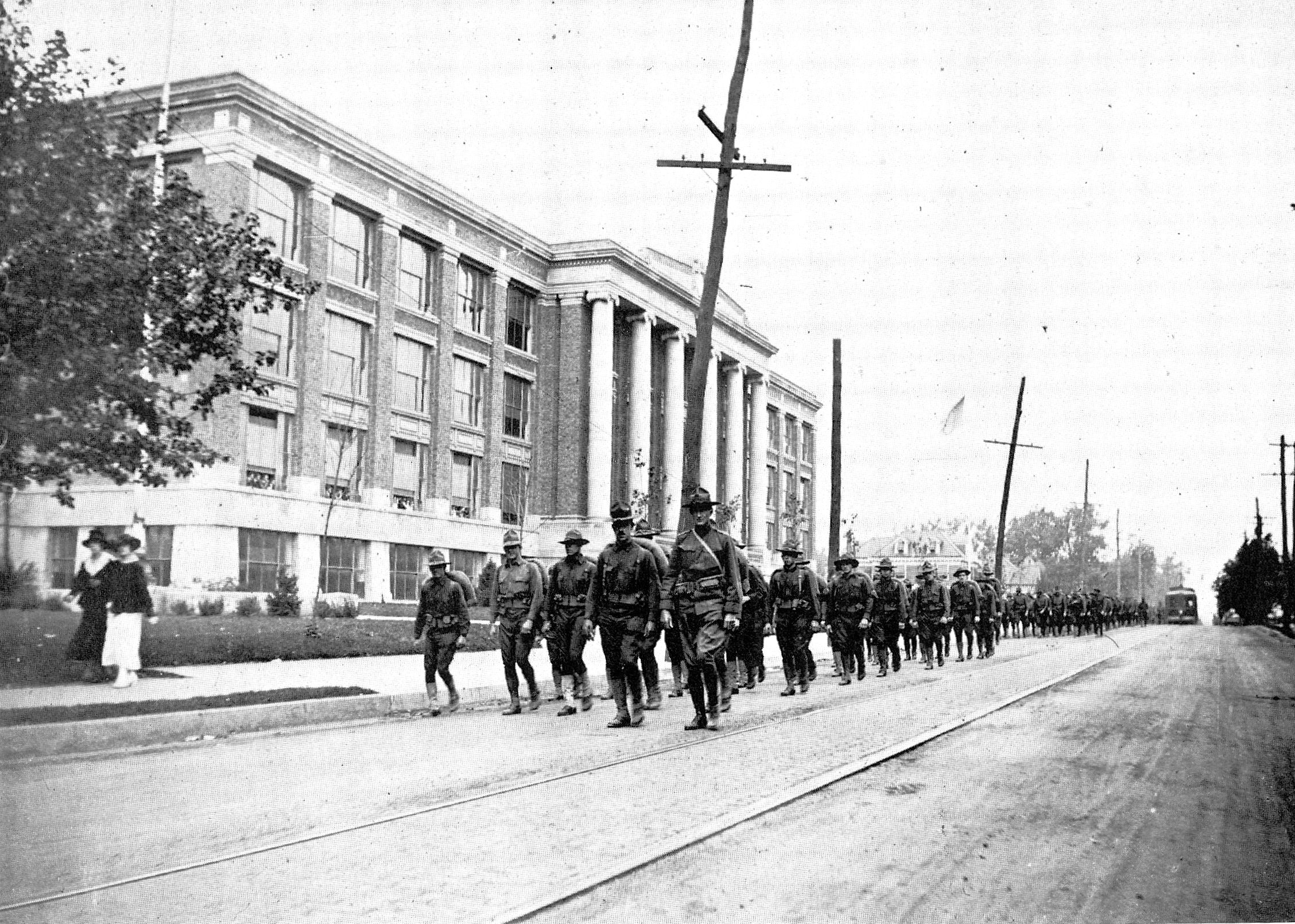
Trainees marching south on 17th Street past Allentown High School, 1918

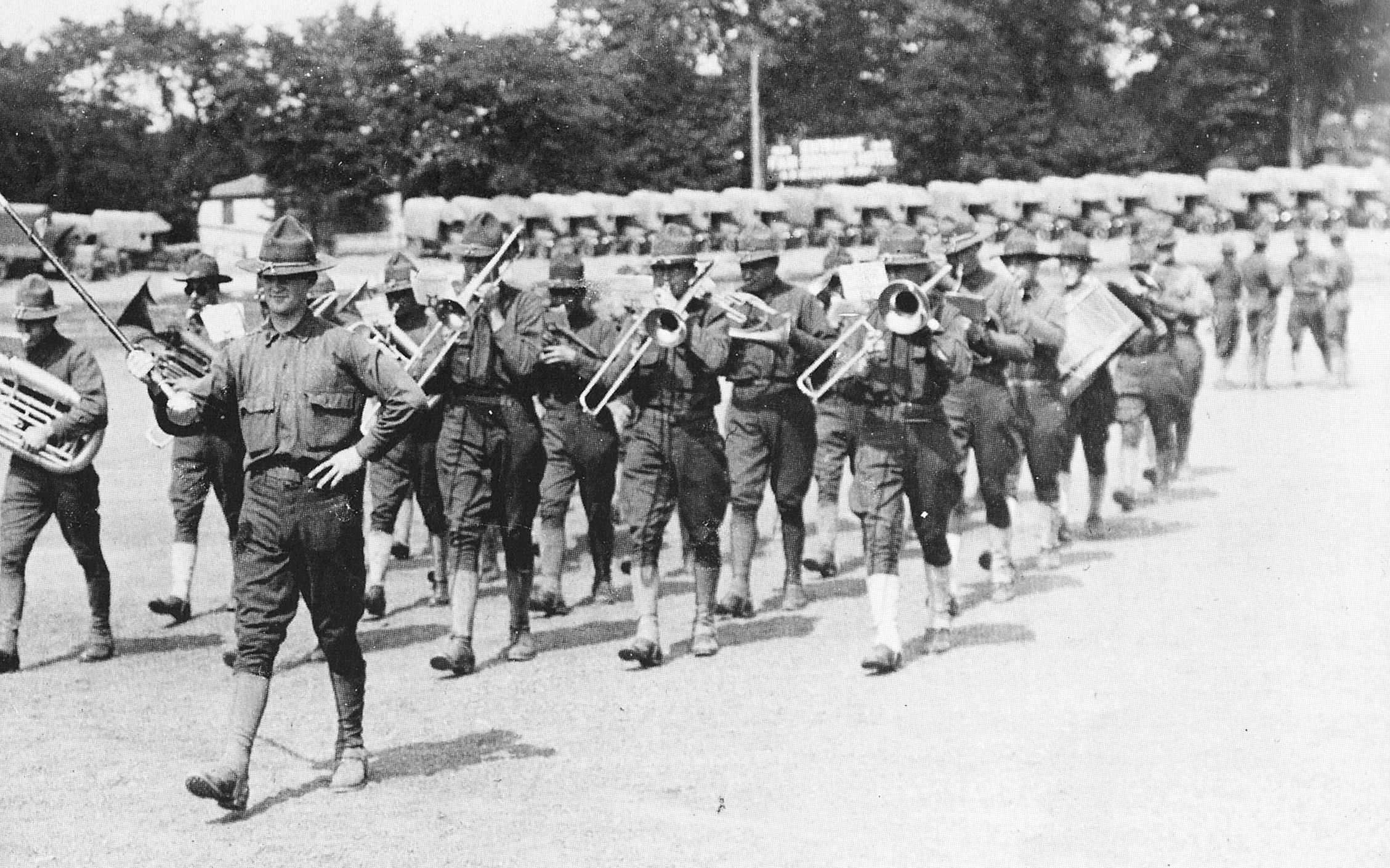
United States Army Ambulance Service Marching Band practicing at Camp Crane in the interior of the horse racing track, 1918

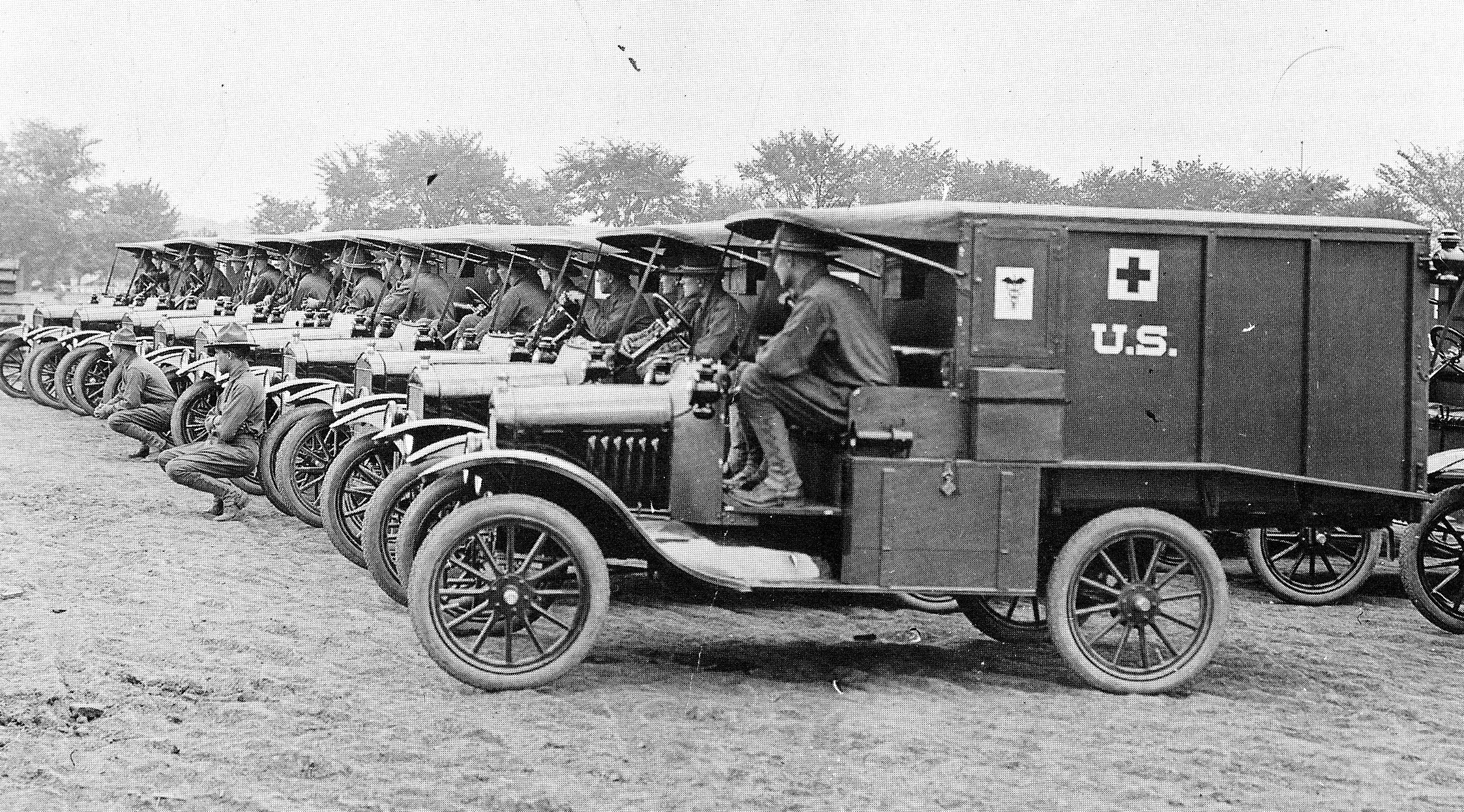
Camp Crane ambulances and drivers

Unlike other Army camps which generally were located nearby, but outsides of towns and cities. Camp Crane was located in a city, although the West End of Allentown at the time was sparsely populated.

Recruits began to arrive on June 1. They were billeted in available fairgrounds buildings, including horse barns, pig pens, and horse cooling sheds. A large mess hall was established under the Fairgrounds Grandstands. The fairgrounds itself, a dirt and grass field, became a large tent city, with tents being erected for the recruits to live in. At the same time Camp Crane became the home of over eighty doctors and other members of three temporary field hospitals that used Allentown as a staging area. Nurses were housed in the nearby Nurses College of Allentown Hospital. Evacuation hospital units and mobile hospital and surgical units were also to come to Allentown to prepare for wartime duty in Europe.

According to the camp’s commanding officer, Lieutenant Colonel Richard Slee, the camp was originally only intended to house approximately 2,500 men. Before the camp was brought up to full speed, however, that number had increased to 4,500 and then to 7,500. As a result of the large numbers of men occupying such a small space, housing was an acute problem. Several additional buildings were constructed at the western end of the fairgrounds beginning in July 1917, and several others were built on the eastern end to relieve the overcrowding.

Despite such makeshift quarters, the USAAS attracted the adventurous by offering the promise of quick and certain action in Europe. By 19 June 1917, over thirteen hundred volunteers were in training at Camp Crane; a week later, the number stood at thirty-three hundred. In all, 20,310 volunteers (2,085 officers and 18,225 enlisted) trained at Camp Crane between 1 June 1917 and 10 April 1919.

In September 1917, the USAAS was joined by 150 gas mask instructors. They established a separate school for training gas mask instructors who would instruct soldiers about using the masks in France.

Volunteers came from Army recruiting stations, predecessor volunteer ambulance units, and a variety of institutions and industrial organizations. Sponsors of USAAS sections included over forty universities and colleges. Harvard University, which had led in the number of volunteers for the American Field Service, set another record by providing three USAAS sections. Other sponsors included corporations, cities, and sports groups.

The trainees were an exceptional group. Volunteers for the Army Ambulance Service were generally conscientious objectors, who did not want to serve in combat units. As such, many of them were undergraduate college students planning a medical career. The Ambulance Service was a way for them to satisfy their draft obligation and also for those men who wanted to support the war effort, but not to serve directly in combat. Many volunteers were medical students who wanted to do their part for the war effort. Fifteen All-American college football players among them became the nucleus of a team that played a winning season against a lineup that included Georgetown University, Penn State, and Fordham University, a few of which later played in the early National Football League teams of the 1920s. The camp band also attracted premier musical talent, also drawn from college bands and music schools around the country. John Philip Sousa was among the guest conductors. Lt. Col. Clarence P. Franklin, MC, who succeeded Colonel Persons as the camp commander, convinced Sousa to write a march for the Army Ambulance "Corps," and the famous composer copyrighted the "USAAC March" in 1919. The USAAC band participated in several concerts and parades in the Allentown area, as well as bond drives to support the war effort.

Many writers also served in the USAAC. Their transition into the life of a soldier was recorded in letters, diaries, and literature. In 1917 John Dos Passos returned from service in France with Norton-Harjes Ambulance Corps to find a draft notice awaiting him. Deciding to volunteer for the USAAS, he reported to Camp Crane. He later wrote of his "captivity" at "Syphilis Valley" where he said he had washed over a million windows. His novel Three Soldiers was based on his experiences there and featured characters he encountered in training at Camp Crane and later during his service in France. Other notable members of the USAAC who trained at Camp Crane were Ernest Hemingway, Harry Crosby, Ray Kroc, William A. Wellman, and Frank Buckles, whom became the last American World War I veteran.

Those who had volunteered to go "over there" were frustrated when the Army did not quickly ship them to Europe and became bored with repetitive tasks, such as marching day after day. An auxiliary camp was established in August 1917 at Kern's Mill, about eight miles north of Allentown, and at Belzwood, five miles west of Norristown to take the overflow from Camp Crane. To provide even more space, in November a site was set up in-between Heilerman's Crossing and Guth's Station as if they were in trenches in France. Known as Guth Station, the trainees established an underground city, digging in about eight feet deep into the fields and erecting small shacks where they installed small stoves. The recruits found living in the mud and dirt trenches there to be particularly vexing, but it was a good simulation of what they would find on the Western Front.

For recreation, Camp Crane established football, tennis and track teams. The city of Allentown established a "Big Brother" program to work with young men in Allentown. Also the local YMCA provided phonographs, books and magazines. People invited recruits into their private homes for evenings away from the Camp, and local establishments held dances and other social outings.

In time Camp Crane graduates did make it "over there." The first contingent (Section) arrived in France on 21 August 1917, commanded by Colonel Jones, who left Camp Crane to head up the USAAS in France from headquarters in Paris. On 26 September, the commander in chief, A. E. F., requested that an additional 10 sections be sent to France as soon as possible, in addition to the 20 sections already there, plus 300 unassigned recruits. Each section was composed of approximately "45 men, 20 Ford M1917 ambulances, 1 Ford touring car, 1 truck, and a kitchen trailer".

Additional sections were deployed to France and also Italy from Camp Crane as they graduated. On 26 August 1918, the commanding officer at Camp Crane reported that 82 sections had been sent overseas and 8 had been disbanded, but that 31 sections were being organized and motor transport for them secured. The last contingent was sent to France on 2 November 1918. A total of 95 separate Sections were trained in Allentown and deployed to France; 22 were sent to Italy.

Camp Crane also became a pre-embarkation camp in 1918, with thousands of men moving in and out rapidly, usually arriving and leaving on trains in the middle of the night with convoys of trucks rolling through the city to the fairgrounds.

=== Closure ===
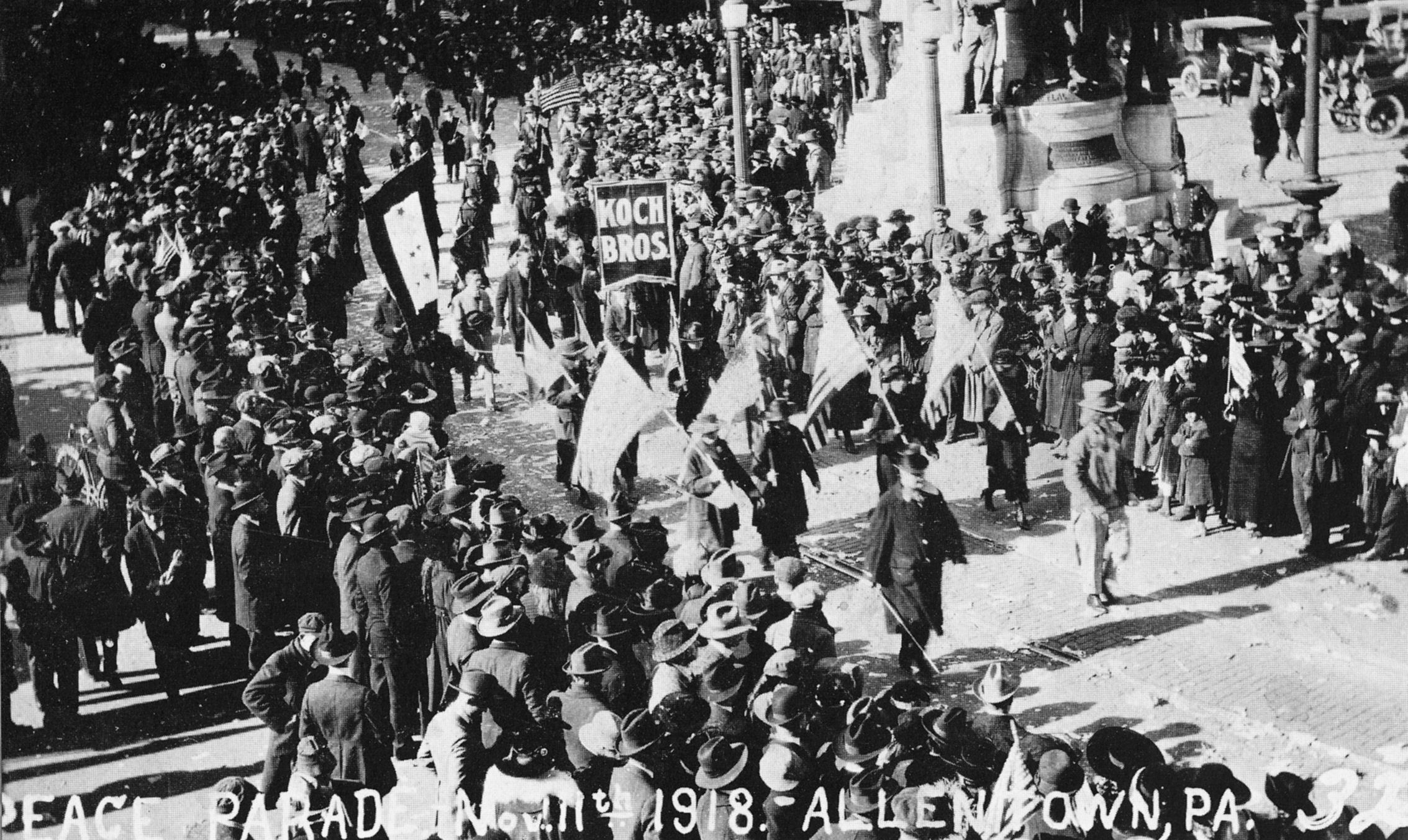
Impromptu Armistice Day Peace Parade passing through Center Square in Allentown, Pennsylvania, November 11, 1918

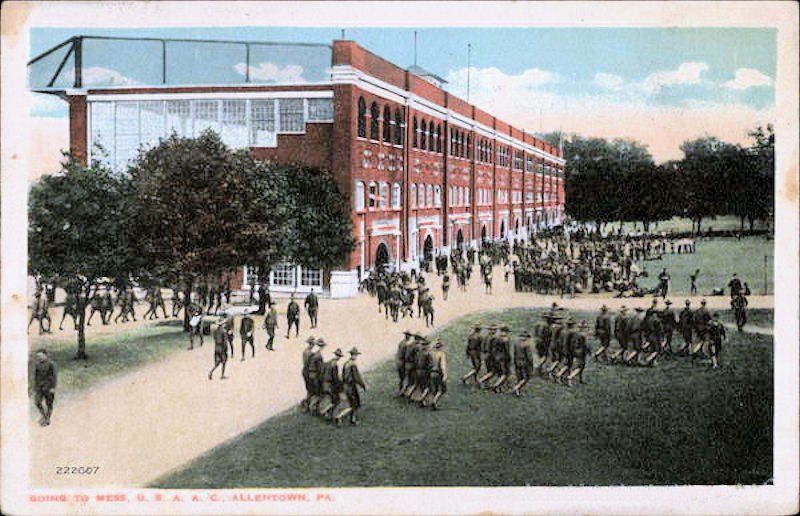
Hand colored postcard of Camp Crane, 1918

With the Armistice with Germany announced on November 11, 1918, a massive parade was held, and several hundred of the recruits being trained at Camp Crane marched through the city. Afterward, training ended and the recruits began to leave for home. During the winter of 1918-1919 Army activities at Camp Crane began to wind down, and preparations began to close the camp and return it to the LCAS. Flags at Camp Crane were taken down for the last time in a ceremony held at noon on 10 April 1919 and the fairgrounds was turned back over to the Agricultural society. The men of the USAAC that had gone to France and Italy had hoped to be able to be demobilized in Allentown, but by the time of their return it was closed.

The Army had made significant changes to the fairgrounds. A large steam-heating plant was installed with steam pipes dug throughout the fairgrounds which equipped all the buildings for heat. A large amusement hall with bowling alleys with a large library and a cinema was built. Numerous buildings for classes and barracks were also erected.

The buildings erected by the Army were mostly sold off and either moved to new locations or dismantled and used for wood to build new buildings. Over $120,000 worth of iron and steel from the buildings, along with the heating, piping, and other components were taken apart and sold off. In addition, huge piles of coal were left with over 4,000 tons that needed to be taken away. However, by the end of August 1919, nearly all physical evidence of Camp Crane was gone, and the 1919 Allentown Fair was held at the site.

In 1927, a stone monument to the men who trained at Camp Crane was erected at the Allentown Fairgrounds. In the 1960s it was moved to Allentown's West Park, a few blocks away. Another memorial can be found on the wall of the fairgrounds grandstand, near the ticket office which was placed there in 1972.

=== Commemoration ===
In 2017, to honor the camp's 100th anniversary, the nearby Lehigh Valley Heritage Museum gathered artifacts and pictures, along with a replica of a Ford ambulance used at the camp, for a yearlong exhibit; during the Great Allentown Fair the exhibit was moved to the fair's Agriplex building, where fairgoers were able to learn about the camp.

== See also ==
- List of ambulance drivers during World War I
- List of historic places in Allentown, Pennsylvania
