= PGAM =

PGAM is an acronym which may refer to:

- Phosphoglycerate mutase, an enzyme
- Powers Great American Midways, a traveling carnival midway company in New York
