= John dos Passos Cultural Center =

Coordinates: 32°40′50″N 17°06′17″W

- Centro Cultural John dos Passos
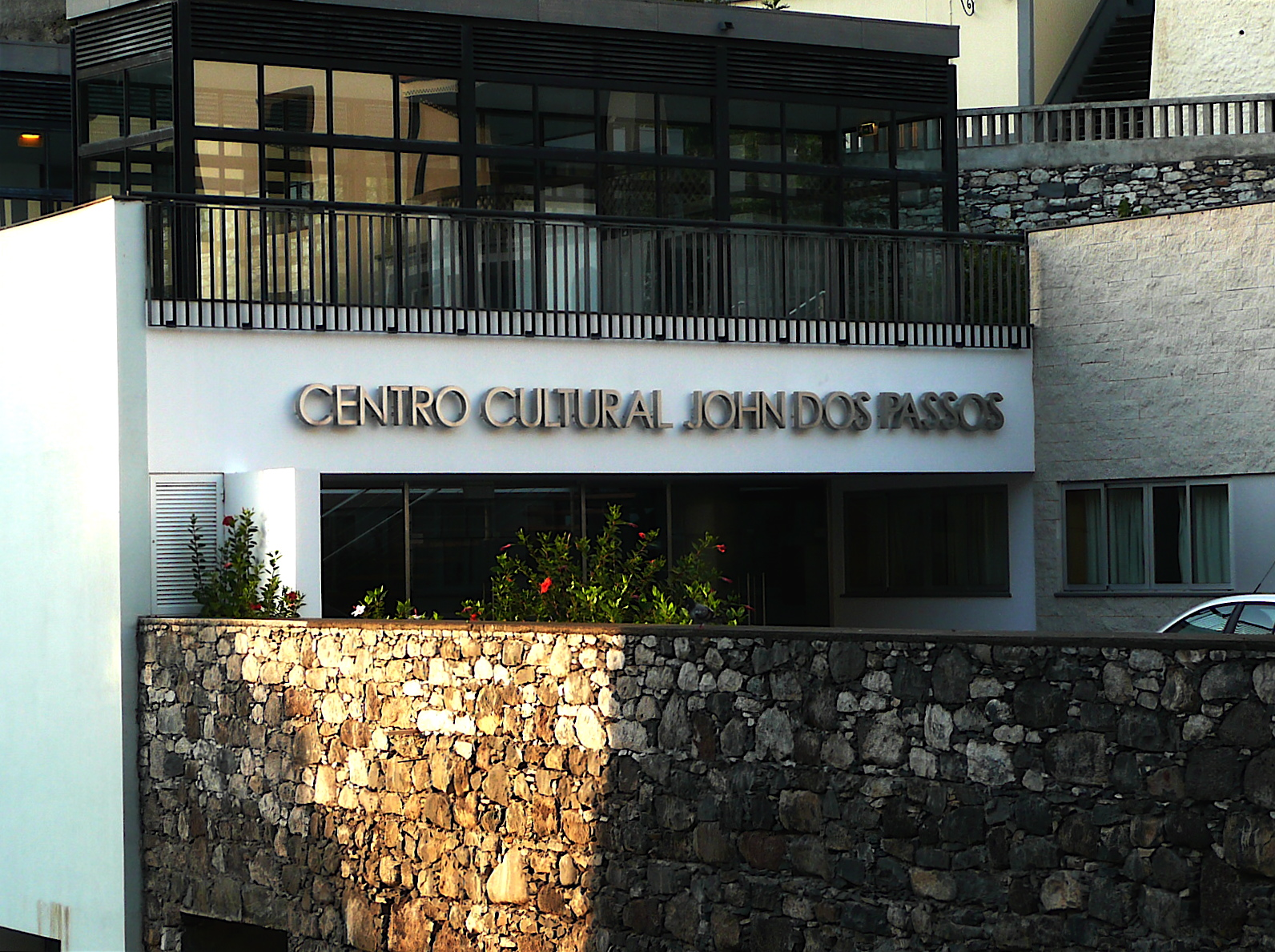
- Interactive map of John dos Passos Cultural Center
- Location: Ponta do Sol, Madeira, Portugal
- Type: Cultural center
- Inauguration date: 20 September 2004; 21 years ago
- Dedicated to: John dos Passos

John dos Passos Cultural Center (Portuguese: Centro Cultural John dos Passos) is the main cultural facility of Ponta do Sol, located in the parish of the same name, on the island of Madeira. It is named in honour of the Luso-descendant writer John Dos Passos, grandson of Madeiran emigrants, and also as a tribute to emigration as a whole. It was officially inaugurated on 20 September 2004.

Its main objective is to promote cultural activities in the field of literature, as well as to study subjects related to the writer John dos Passos through a Scientific Research Unit. It also includes a small museum nucleus where bedroom furniture integrated into a 19th-century building can be seen. Various photographs of the writer's visits to the birthplace of his paternal grandfather, Ponta do Sol, are on display.

Restoration works began in 2000, and the building now includes an annex housing the Casa do Povo, the Choir Group, the Theatre Group, the Municipal Band, the Folklore Group, and an auditorium with seating for 180 spectators.

== Facilities ==
It consists of:

- A new building, comprising an auditorium with seating for 180 people and activity rooms;
- The old house, which once belonged to the writer's family, comprising museum spaces (bedroom and kitchen), a permanent exhibition room (with photographs related to John Dos Passos), the Dr Carmo da Cunha Santos Library, a private reading room, and several workspaces.

== See also ==
- John Dos Passos Prize
