= José Robles =

Spanish author (1897–1937)

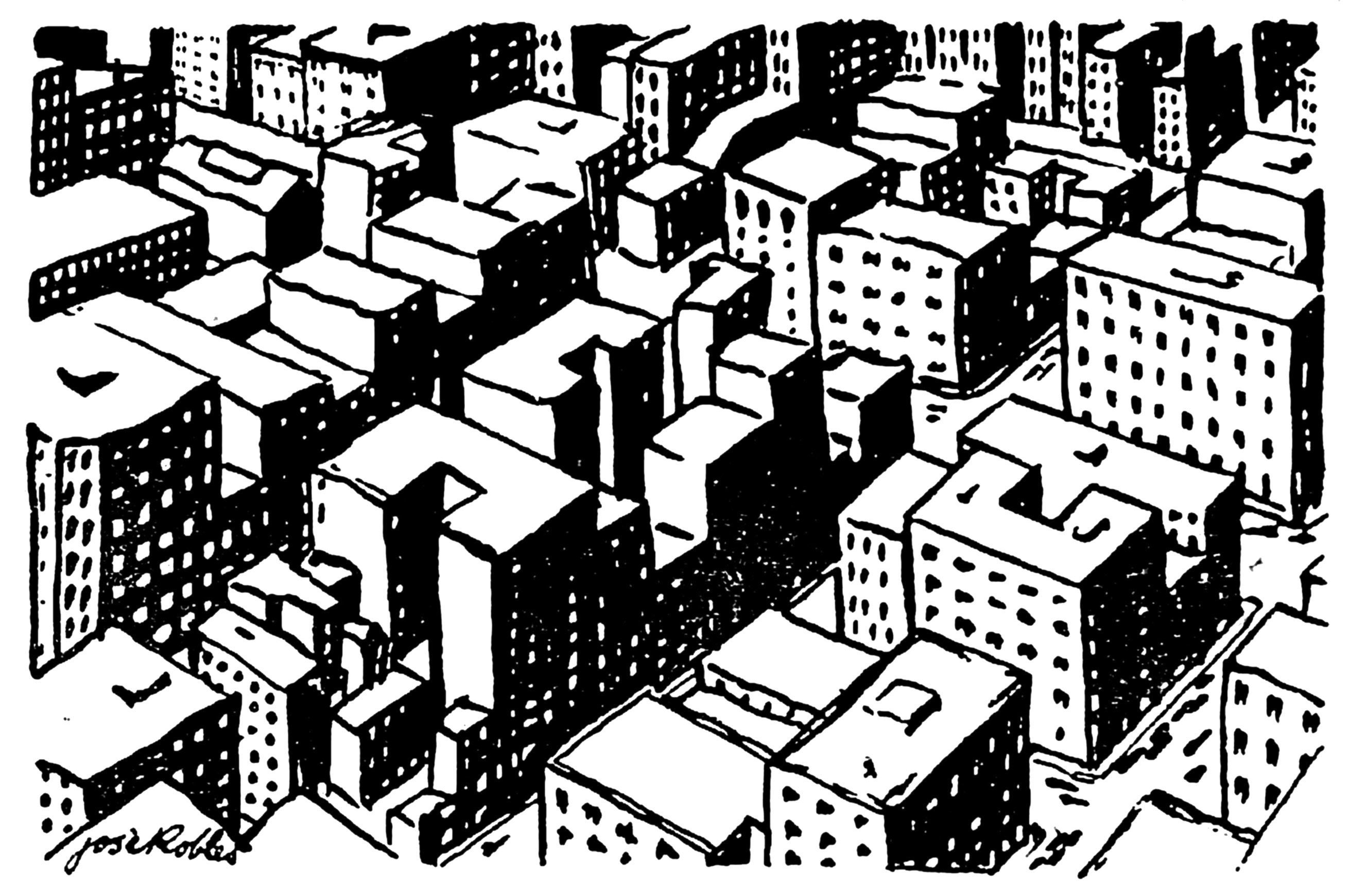
Downtown, 1928 drawing by Robles

José Robles Pazos (Santiago de Compostela, 1897–1937) was a Spanish writer, academic and independent left-wing activist. Born to an aristocratic family, Robles embraced left-wing views which forced him to leave Spain and go into exile in the United States.

== Biography ==
In the 1920s, he was teaching at Johns Hopkins University and became a friend and Spanish language translator for writer John Dos Passos, who at the time also supported the radical left. His translation of Manhattan Transfer is still considered to be exemplary. He also translated some works of Sinclair Lewis.

At the outbreak of the Spanish Civil War, Robles was on vacation in Spain. He supported the cause of the Spanish Republic, but his independent and outspoken views brought him in conflict with the Soviet Union's emissaries, who were gaining increasing control of the Republican government.

In early 1937 Robles disappeared. The American left-wing journalist Josephine Herbst, then on a visit to the Civil War front, found out that he had been arrested and shot as an alleged "spy for Francoists", and conveyed this information to Ernest Hemingway and Dos Passos who were in Madrid. The exact circumstances of his death were never clarified, and the charge of his having spied for the Nationalists was doubted. Rather, it was suggested that he was among many other left-wingers (for example, Andreu Nin) killed by Soviet NKVD agents, led by Alexander Orlov, for their independent stance at the time.

In a letter to the editor published in The New Republic in July 1939, Dos Passos wrote that it was not until he reached Madrid (after having spent a week in Valencia) that he got what he called "definite information from the then chief of the Republican counter-espionage service that Robles had been executed by a 'special section' (which I gathered was under control of the Communist Party) … Spaniards I talked to closer to the Communist Party took the attitude that Robles had been shot as an example to other officials because he had been overheard indiscreetly discussing military plans in a cafe. The 'fascist spy' theory seems to be the fabrication of romantic American Communist sympathizers. I certainly did not hear it from any Spaniards."

According to research by writer Stephen Koch, the real reason Robles was killed was that he had been the translator of Yan Karlovich Berzin, a senior Soviet military envoy to Spain who knew no Spanish. When Berzin disputed with Orlov about the relative priority to be given to preserving the military efficiency of Spanish Republican forces vs. conducting NKVD purges of Spanish Anarchists, POUM etc., and lost the favor of Stalin as a result, then Robles' knowledge of behind-the-scenes Soviet maneuverings in Spain became highly inconvenient to the Soviets.

Robles' execution caused a total rift between Hemingway and Dos Passos, who were previously friends. Hemingway condoned the killing, as "necessary in time of war", while Dos Passos, embittered by the death of his friend, broke away from the left altogether and started his move to the political right.

Robles' last days before his disappearance are shown in a 2012 movie Hemingway & Gellhorn.
