= Dos Passos Prize =

American liberary award

John Dos Passos Prize
- Awarded for: A substantial body of published work that displays an intense and original exploration of specifically American themes, an experimental approach to form, and an interest in a wide range of human experience.
- Country: United States
- Presented by: Longwood University
- First award: 1980
- Website: www.longwood.edu/english/dos-passos-prize/

The John Dos Passos Prize is an annual literary award given to American writers.

The Prize was founded at Longwood University in 1980 and is meant to honor John Dos Passos by recognizing other writers in his name. The prize is administered by a committee from the Department of English and Modern Languages; the chair of the committee also serves as the chair of the prize jury. Other members on the committee include the immediate past recipient and a distinguished critic, editor, or scholar.

Recipients of the prize receive $5,000 and a bronze medal engraved with their name.

== Recipients ==
Year	Winner	Ref.
1980	Graham Greene (Note: Awarded before the prize was limited to strictly American authors)	
1981	Gilbert Sorrentino	
1982	Robert Stone	
1983	Doris Betts	
1984	Tom Wolfe	
1985	Russell Banks	
1986	John Edgar Wideman	
1987	Lee Smith	
1988	Shelby Foote	
1989	Paule Marshall	
1990	Larry Woiwode	
1991	Elizabeth Spencer	
1992	William Hoffman	
1993	Ernest J. Gaines	
1994	James Welch	
1995	Helena Maria Viramontes	
1997	E. Annie Proulx	
1998	Maxine Hong Kingston	
1999	Eric Kraft	
2000	Jill McCorkle	
2001	Madison Smartt Bell	
2002	Randall Kenan	
2003	Richard Powers	
2004	Maureen Howard	
2005	Tim Gautreaux	
2006	Kent Haruf	
2008	Allen Wier	
2009	Robert Bausch	
2010	Percival Everett	
2011	Mat Johnson	
2012	Colson Whitehead	
2013	Sherman Alexie	
2014	Ruth Ozeki	
2015	Paul Beatty	
2016	Danzy Senna	
2017	Chang-Rae Lee	
2018	Karen Tei Yamashita	
2019	Rabih Alameddine	
2020	Aleksandar Hemon	
2021	Monique Truong	
2022	Carolina De Robertis	
2023	Patricia Engel	
2024	Angie Cruz	
2025	Eugene Lim	

== See also ==
- John dos Passos Cultural Center
