= William Hoffman (author) =

American novelist and Veteran

- Hoffman in 1994
- Born: Henry William Hoffman; May 16, 1925; West Virginia, U.S.
- Died: September 12, 2009 (aged 84)
- Occupations: Writer; Novelist
- Writing career
- Genre: American literature
- Notable awards: Dos Passos Prize (1992); O. Henry Award (1996); Hammett Prize (1999)
- Military career
- Branch: United States Army
- Conflicts: World War II; Normandy Landings; Battle of the Bulge

Henry William Hoffman (May 16, 1925 – September 12, 2009) was an American writer who published thirteen novels and four books of short stories and two plays. He was born in West Virginia but spent his formative years in southwestern Virginia.

William Hoffman was the recipient of the 1992 John Dos Passos Prize. In 1996 he was awarded the O. Henry Prize, and in 1999 he received the Dashiell Hammett Award for the book Tidewater Blood. His short story "Dancer," published in The Sewanee Review, won the 1989 Andrew Lytle Prize. He wrote mysteries towards the end of his career. His first novel, The Trumpet Unblown, reflected his horrific experiences as a medic in World War II.

== Novels ==
- The Trumpet Unblown (1955)
- Days in the Yellow Leaf (1958)
- A Place for My Head (1960)
- The Dark Mountains (1963)
- Yancey's War (1966)
- A Walk to the River (1970)
- A Death of Dreams (1973)
- The Land That Drank the Rain (1982)
- Godfires (1985)
- Furors Die (1990)
- Tidewater Blood (1998)
- Blood and Guile (2000)
- Wild Thorn (2002)
- Lies (2005)

== Non-fiction ==
- Contract Killer (1992)

== Short stories ==
- Virginia Reels (1978)
- By Land, By Sea (1988)
- Follow Me Home (1994)
- Doors (1999)
