= Allentown Fairgrounds =

Coordinates: 40.60153°N 75.49625°W

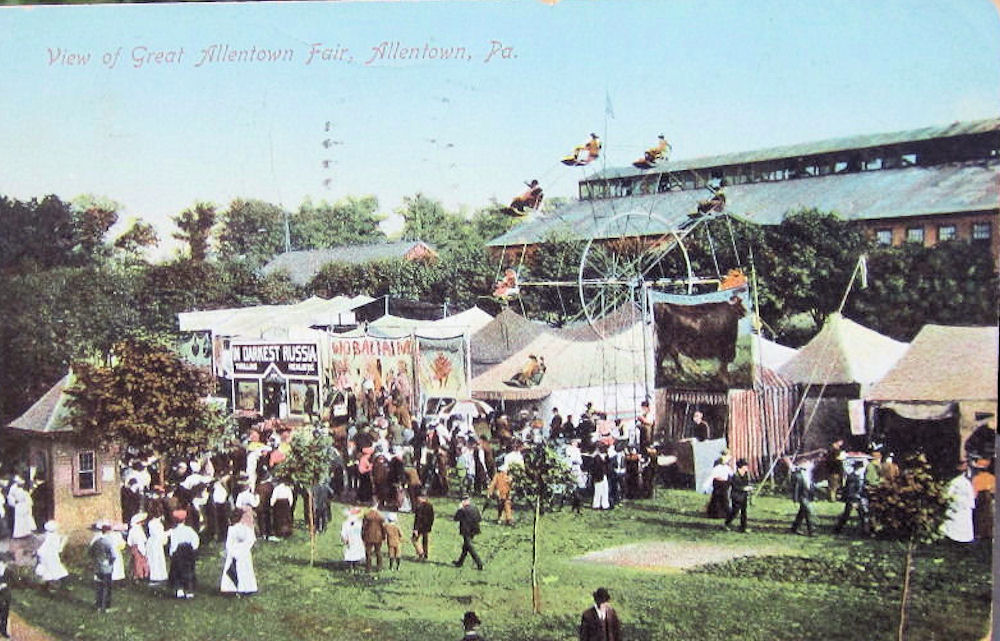
Allentown Fairgrounds, c. 1901

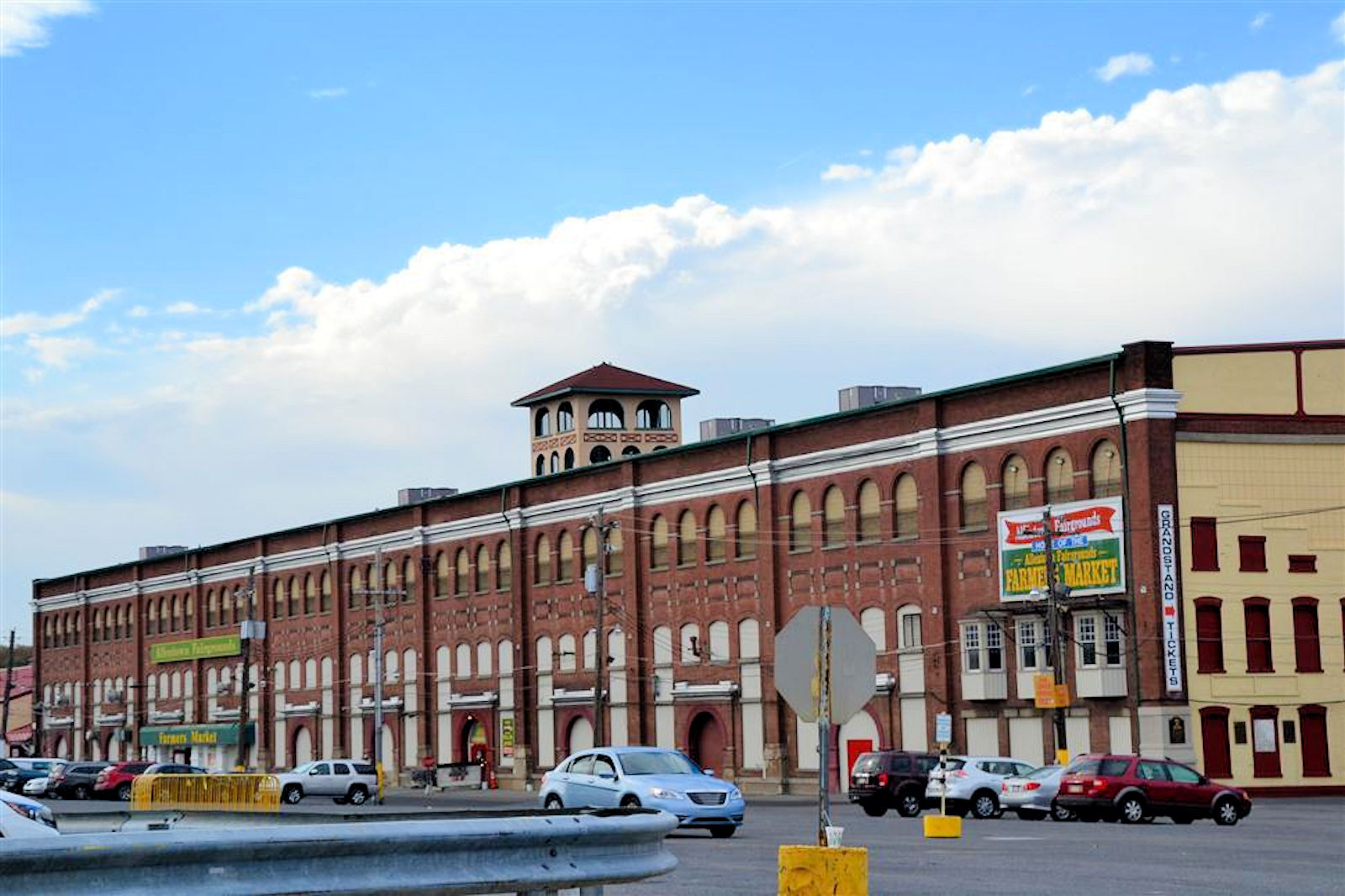
Allentown Fairgrounds Grandstand, in 2018

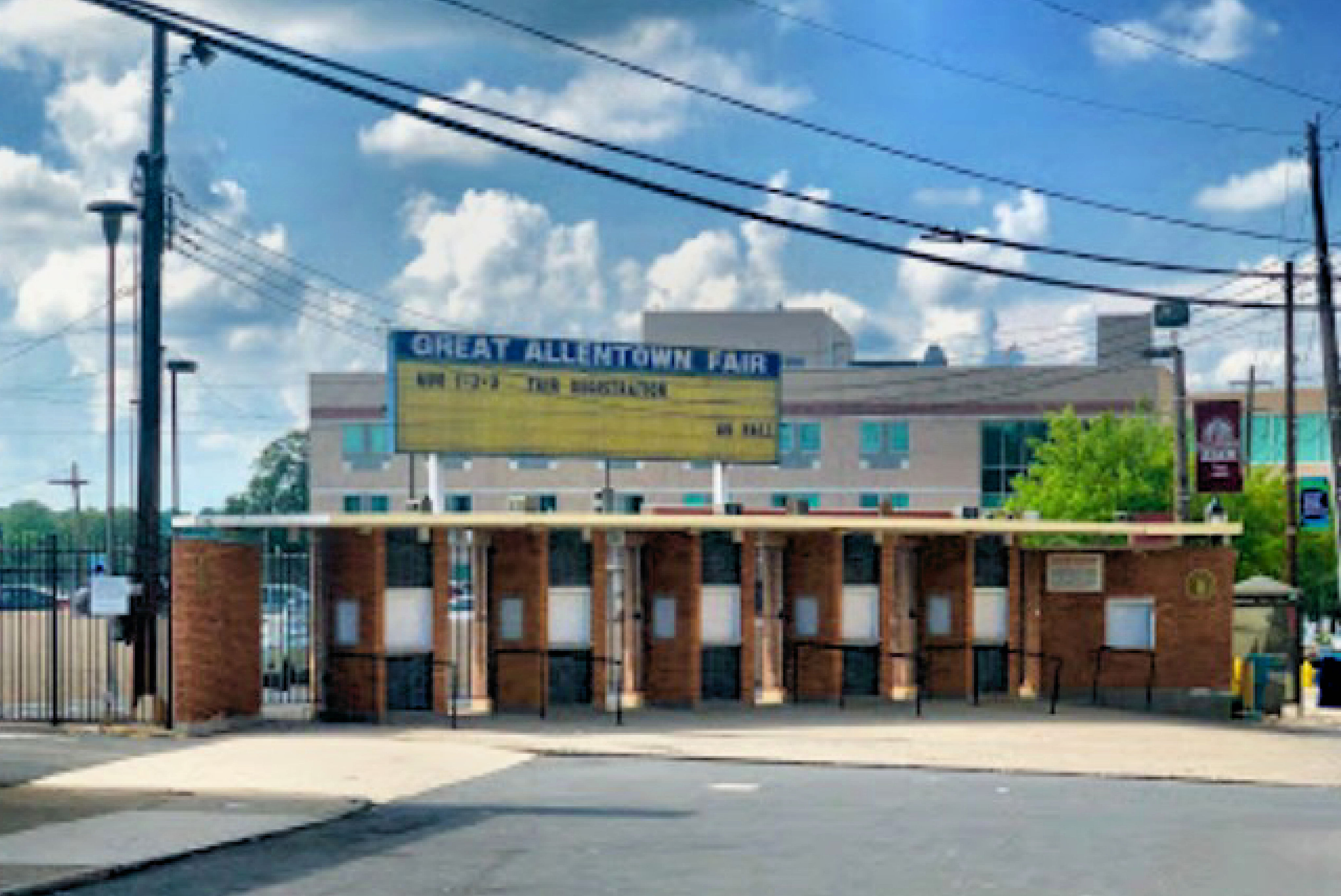
Main entrance to Allentown Fairgrounds, in 2019

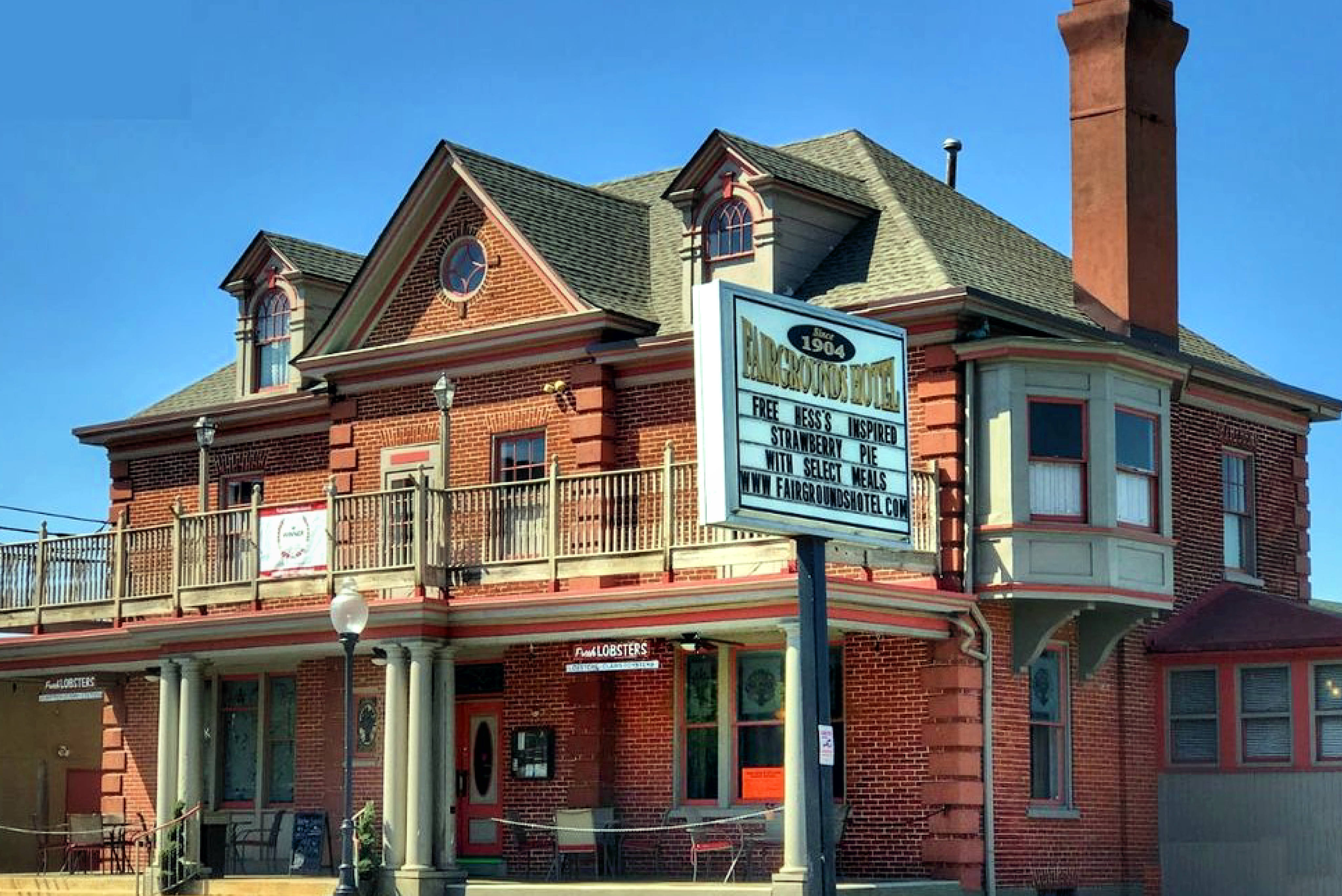
Allentown Fairgrounds Hotel at 448 N. 17th Street, in 2020

Allentown Fairgrounds is located at 302 North 17th Street in Allentown, Pennsylvania. It hosts the Great Allentown Fair annually in late August and early September. The fairgrounds was established in 1889 and comprises 46 acres. It is owned and operated by the Lehigh County Agricultural Society.

== History ==
=== 19th century ===
In 1852, the Lehigh County Agricultural Society launched the first of what would become a long-running Lehigh Valley tradition, the annual Great Allentown Fair. The first fair, which was held from October 6 to 8 that year on land east of Allentown's Fourth Street, between Union and Walnut streets, was followed up the next year on a plot of land located between Fifth and Sixth streets and north of Liberty Street, which had recently been purchased by the society and transformed with the construction of a ticket office and two-story exhibition hall, where fair attendees roamed on September 28, 29 and 30, 1853.

An increasingly successful event, the annual fair, continued to attract an audience. It was cancelled for a year in 1862, however, due to the Civil War and the conversion of the fairgrounds into a training camp for the 176th Pennsylvania Volunteer Infantry. The Great Allentown Fair then resumed operations in 1863, continuing on until 1917, when the U.S. federal government converted the 46-acre grounds into Camp Crane, a training facility for the U.S. Army's Ambulance Service, paying the agricultural society $37,000 per year for its lease. Named in honor of Brigadier General Charles H. Crane, who served as surgeon general of the U.S. Army from 1882 to 1883, the camp was home to anywhere between 4,000 and 5,000 men at various points in time during World War I.

=== 20th century ===
Shortly after World War II, the Central States Racing Association (CSRA) held a "big car", now sprint car, race at the fairgrounds. The track reached capacity by 3:00pm with 124,172 paid admissions. Thousands of additional spectators arrived later, watching the race from outside the track walls. The race was won by Jimmy Wilburn.

From 1977 to 1984, the WWWF, later renamed the WWF, held television tapings at the Allentown Fairgrounds' Agricultural Hall.

== Current attractions ==
The Allentown Fairgrounds currently operates multiple attractions, including:

- Grandstand - A large outdoor stage where big-name musicians perform
- Farmerama Theater - An amphitheater where talent contests are held and assorted daytime entertainment takes place
- Music Tent - A tent where bands perform when an area as large as the Grandstand is not needed
- Main Entrance Plaza - An area where special shows, such as juggling acts, are held
- Agriplex/Agriland - The fair's agricultural-themed areas

During the rest of the year, with the exception of the week before and after the fair, the area beneath the grandstand, and an adjoining building, together host an indoor farmers' market, usually open Thursdays, Fridays, and Saturdays, but also open additional weekdays before and after major holidays. The Agriplex buildings also host a wide variety of events throughout the year, which are listed separately on the fair's Web site.
