= Powers Great American Midways =

- Company type: Privately held company
- Industry: Amusement - Midway
- Founded: 1980
- Headquarters: Corfu, New York
- Key people: Les "Corky" Powers (President); Debbie Powers (Vice President)
- Products: Amusement ride rental/operation and traveling carnival management
- Website: http://www.powersmidways.com/

Powers Great American Midways (PGAM) is a family operated traveling carnival midway company based in Corfu, New York. It provides amusement rides, games and concessions for local, county and state fairs throughout the eastern United States. The business is a trade name of Amusements of Rochester, Inc.

== History ==
Powers Great American Midways was formed in 1980 in Rochester, New York by current owner and operator Les "Corky" Powers. The company originally began as a 10-to-12 ride local carnival which traveled around New York and Pennsylvania. It has since expanded to around 70 rides, composed of two units which can split and provide midways to smaller venues on their route throughout the eastern United States.

A full-time refurbishing facility is located in Burgaw, North Carolina, and has been operated year-round since 1994, where PGAM rides and equipment can be maintained. It also serves as the winter quarters. The facility has occasionally been used by the North Carolina Department of Labor for training ride inspection personnel. Like other carnival midway companies, many PGAM rides have recently become eco-friendly including the use of LED lighting and biodiesel fueled generators.

In 2006, PGAM was awarded a contract to provide the midway at the North Carolina State Fair. They continue to operate it today. Other notable events the company currently works include the Great Allentown Fair in Allentown, Pennsylvania, the Big Butler Fair in Prospect, Pennsylvania and the Shenandoah Apple Blossom Festival in Winchester, Virginia.
