= Adventures of a Young Man =

1939 novel by John Dos Passos

- First edition
- Author: John Dos Passos
- Language: English
- Genre: Fiction
- Publisher: Harcourt Brace
- Publication date: 1939

Adventures of a Young Man is a 1939 novel by John Dos Passos. It is the first in what became known as Dos Passos's District of Columbia Trilogy, which also includes Number One (1943) and The Grand Design (1943). All three are set in the same fictional universe, featuring different members of the Spotswood family, and the three were published together in the 1952 compilation District of Columbia.

The novel tells of a disillusioned young American radical, Glenn Spotswood, who fights on the side of the Second Spanish Republic during the Spanish Civil War and is killed during the war. It is similar in concept to Ernest Hemingway's 1940 novel For Whom the Bell Tolls. Both books are the outcome of the 1937 visit by Dos Passos and Hemingway to Spain, during which their friendship broke up in a sharp quarrel on political as well as personal grounds.

Critic George Packer in The New Yorker deplored the oblivion into which the Dos Passos book had fallen (mainly due to the rightwards political move of its author) and considered it as deserving of enduring fame as Hemingway's novel: "Hemingway’s romantic fable is in almost every way more compelling. But Dos Passos, in his dispirited and unblinking realism, was the one to convey what it meant to be alive in the nineteen-thirties".
