= United States Army Ambulance Service =

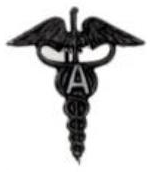
- An early insignia of the service.
- Active: 1917 to 1919
- Country: United States
- Allegiance: United States
- Branch: United States Army
- Garrison/HQ: Allentown, Pennsylvania, U.S.

The United States Army Ambulance Service (USAAS) was a unit of the United States Army established by the United States Department of War during World War I. It was established by General Order No. 75 of the War Department in May 1917 and was headquartered in Allentown, Pennsylvania.

It incorporated the volunteer sections of the American Field Service, which was formed prior to the American entry into World War I, and provided medical services to injured French, British, and Italian soldiers during World War I.

In World War II, the unit aided the British and the Italians.

== Structure ==
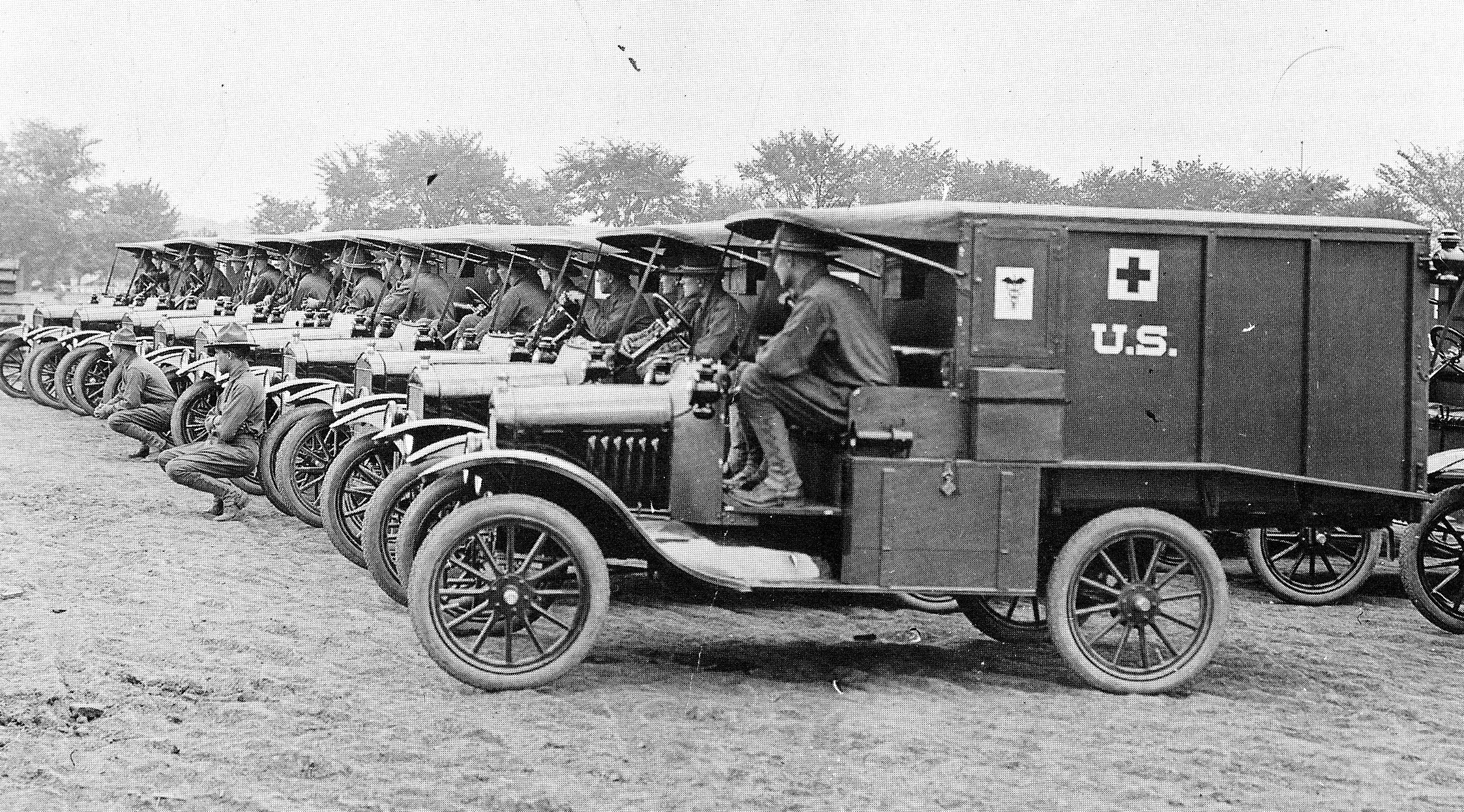
USAAS personnel in training at Camp Crane in Allentown, Pennsylvania

Each section was composed of approximately "45 men, 20 Ford ambulances, 1 Ford touring car, 1 truck, and a kitchen trailer."

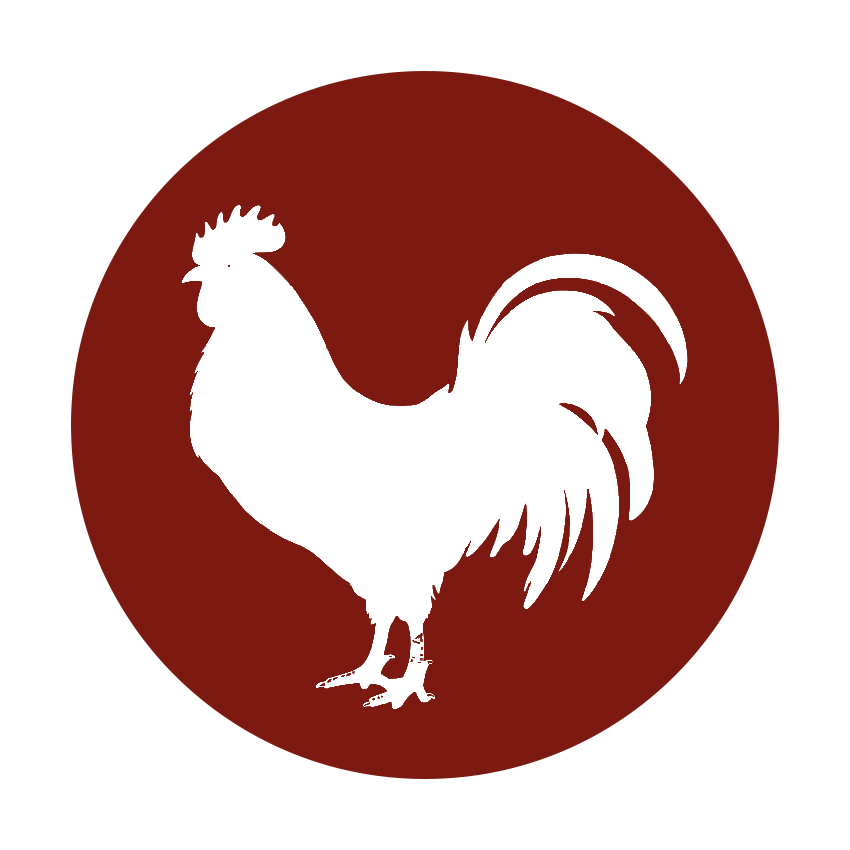
World War I Ambulance Service Insignia - the rooster was featured often with the Greek god of healing, Asclepius and is still featured today on the US Army Medical Department (AMEDD) regimental insignia.

The number of officers peaked at 209 officers in November 1918. In the course of demobilization, the number was reduced to three by July 1920. It was organized into 160 sections, each called Sanitary Squad Units. The Sanitary Squad Unit typically supported a division, or about 10,000 soldiers.
