= Manhattan Transfer (novel) =

1925 novel by John Dos Passos

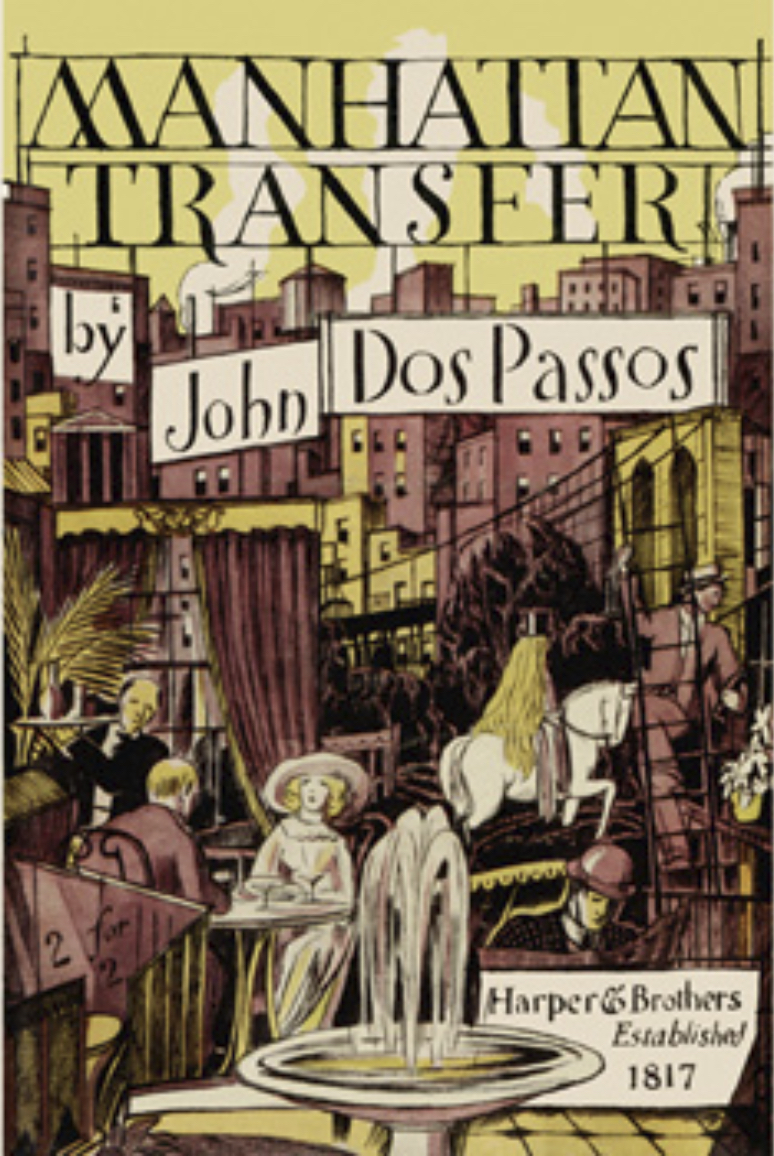
- First edition cover
- Author: John Dos Passos
- Language: English
- Publisher: Harper & Brothers
- Publication date: 1925
- Publication place: United States

Manhattan Transfer is an American novel by John Dos Passos published in 1925. It focuses on the development of urban life in New York City from the Gilded Age to the Jazz Age as told through a series of overlapping individual stories.

It is considered to be one of Dos Passos' most important works. The book attacks the consumerism and social indifference of contemporary urban life, portraying a Manhattan that is merciless yet teeming with energy and restlessness. The book shows some of Dos Passos' experimental writing techniques and narrative collages that would become more pronounced in his U.S.A. trilogy and other later works. The technique in Manhattan Transfer was inspired in part by James Joyce's Ulysses and T. S. Eliot's The Waste Land (both 1922), and bears frequent comparison to the experiments with film collage by Soviet director Sergei Eisenstein.

Sinclair Lewis described it as "a novel of the very first importance ... The dawn of a whole new school of writing." D. H. Lawrence called it "the best modern book about New York" he had ever read, describing it as "a very complete film ... of the vast loose gang of strivers and winners and losers which seems to be the very pep of New York." In a blurb for a European edition, Ernest Hemingway wrote that, alone among American writers, Dos Passos has "been able to show to Europeans the America they really find when they come here."

== Plot ==
The novel tells the stories, primarily, of four people living in Manhattan from the 1890s to the late 1920s. The stories are presented in a fragmented, contrasting way, often juxtaposing them to bring out new meaning. The title of the book refers to a railway station, and the way that Manhattan itself was undergoing change.

The primary characters and stories include:

- Ellen Thatcher—Ellen's father is an accountant and her early life was one of genteel poverty. She aspires to become an actress, which is not socially acceptable to her parents and their peers. Early in her story, Ellen becomes successful, but success brings with it hundreds of rich and famous suitors and she struggles to determine who is sincere and who is not. Eventually, she marries John "Jojo" Oglethorpe, a fellow actor. Ellen engages in numerous affairs, which Oglethorpe tolerates. The Panic of 1896 devastates the local economy. Ellen meets Stan Emery, a wealthy student at Harvard University who has dropped out due to alcoholism, and they begin an affair. Oglethorpe finally snaps, and stands outside Stan's apartment building one night screaming in a drunken fury. Stan ends his relationship with Ellen and marries another girl. Shortly thereafter, he commits suicide by setting himself on fire. Ellen learns she is pregnant with Stan's baby. Although Stan is the only person she ever truly loved, in her fury she has an abortion. Her story then intersects with that of Jimmy Herf.
- Bud Korpenning—Born to a farming family in upstate New York, he kills his abusive father. He takes a riverboat down the Hudson River to New York City, where he hopes to escape justice by becoming one of the anonymous millions in the city. Isolation, unemployment, poverty, and starvation take their toll on him. He becomes increasingly paranoid, believing the police to be on his trail. He commits suicide by throwing himself off a bridge.
- George Baldwin—An ambitious, married young lawyer, George at first struggles to build his practice. George then learns about Gus McNeil, a newly married milkman whose truck was hit by a train. George realizes the case will draw much public attention and decides to represent Gus. George begins an affair with Gus' wife, Nellie. Gus wins his lawsuit and becomes wealthy. George, however, fails to capitalize on the lawsuit and his practice still struggles. He loses interest in Nellie, and becomes infatuated with actress Ellen Thatcher. Ellen flirts with him at a bar. When she admits she only flirted with him for her own amusement, George threatens her with a pistol. His wife, Cecily, tired of his endless philandering, divorces him. After World War I ends, Gus, who is now a powerful local politician, urges George to run for office. George refuses repeatedly, and then decides to run for office as a reformer. This enrages the radical Gus. After her divorce from Jimmy Herf, Ellen Thatcher marries George.
- Jimmy Herf—Teenage Jimmy arrives in New York City with his wealthy mother. When she has a stroke and dies, Jimmy goes to live with the Merrivales (his mother's sister). Jimmy is a good student and the Merrivales want him to go to business school, but Jimmy is concerned about social justice and wants to become a reporter. When World War I breaks out, Jimmy enlists. During the war, Jimmy meets Ellen Thatcher in Europe, and they marry and have a son, Martin. After the war ends, Jimmy and Ellen return to New York City. Ellen quits the stage, and they live in extreme poverty. Their marriage unravels and they divorce. Jimmy quits his job as a journalist, and decides to leave New York City. His departure is the novel's conclusion.

Some of the secondary characters in the novel include:

- Anna Cohen—A young seamstress, she is in love with Elmer, a Communist, political agitator, and union organizer. Her mother throws her out of the house due to her refusal to disavow Elmer. When Elmer is deported during the Palmer Raids at the end of World War I, she is heartbroken. While Ellen Thatcher is visiting the dress shop where Anna works, a gas lamp ignites a fire in a pile of fabric and Anna is horribly disfigured.
- Congo Jake—A French sailor missing one leg, he and Jimmy became good friends during World War I. He emigrates to the United States after the war and becomes a bootlegger. Suddenly wealthy, he takes the name "Armand Duval" and lives on Park Avenue where he hobnobs with other millionaires.
- Harry Goldweiser—One of Ellen's friends, his advice proves critical in boosting her career throughout her life. Goldweiser's exact profession is unclear, but he seems to be a theatrical agent (although he does not represent Ellen). He later states his intention to become a producer. Ellen ruthlessly uses him, even though he believes she is a good friend.
- Joe Harland—Known as the "Wizard of Wall Street", he has won and lost several fortunes over the years. A relative of Jimmy's, by the time he appears in the novel he is an penniless alcoholic who begs for money from family and friends. Jimmy is repulsed by Harland, which is one reason Jimmy decides against a business career.
- The Merrivales—The family consists of father Jeff, mother Emily, daughter Maisie, and son James. Jeff dies from influenza. Maisie marries Jack Cunningham, a publicist for the Famous Players Film Company. James gets a job in a bank and is swiftly promoted.
- Nevada Jones—An aspiring actress and friend of Ellen's, she is one of the many women with whom George Baldwin has an affair. She then takes up with homosexual actor Tony Hunter, who is guilt-stricken by his sexuality. She leaves him when he has a nervous breakdown.
- Madame Rigaud—A French woman who emigrates to the United States after World War I, she owns a delicatessen. Her lover is Emile, a young French sailor who also emigrated to the U.S. after the war. When she sees a raging fire across the street from her store, it terrifies her and she decides to marry Emile.
- Phil Sandbourne—An idealistic young architect, Phil plans to revolutionize architecture with his concept for manufacturing inexpensive colored tile. Distracted by the gaze of a pretty girl, he is hit by a car and severely injured.

== Analysis ==
William Brevda has analysed the theme and symbolism of signs, such as in advertising, in the novel. William Dow has examined the influence of the works of Blaise Cendrars on the novel. Gene Ruoff has looked at the theme of social mobility with respect to artists in the novel. Phillip Arrington has critiqued the ambiguity of the novel's ending.

Josef Grmela has noted artistic similarities between Manhattan Transfer and the U.S.A. Trilogy. David Viera has noted similarities between Manhattan Transfer and Angústia by Graciliano Ramos. Gretchen Foster has examined the influence of cinema techniques on the form of the novel. Michael Spindler has analysed the influence of visual arts on the novel.

== In popular culture ==
A copy of the book appears on the album cover of Have You Considered Punk Music? by the punk band Self Defense Family.

The book inspired the name of the vocal group The Manhattan Transfer in 1969.

== See also ==
- Le Monde's 100 Books of the Century
