= John Dos Passos =

American novelist (1896–1970)

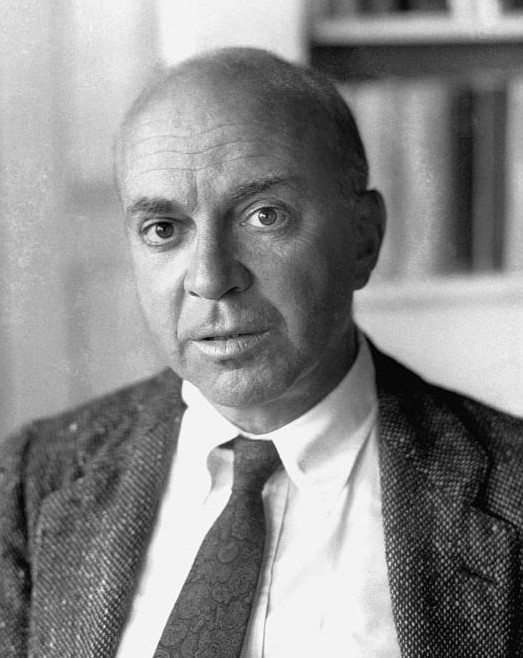
- Born: John Roderigo Dos Passos; January 14, 1896; Chicago, Illinois, U.S.
- Died: September 28, 1970 (aged 74); Baltimore, Maryland, U.S.
- Writing career
- Notable works: Three Soldiers (1921); Manhattan Transfer (1925); U.S.A. (1930–1936)
- Notable awards: Antonio Feltrinelli Prize (1962)

John Roderigo Dos Passos (/dɒsˈpæsəs, -sɒs/; January 14, 1896 – September 28, 1970) was an American novelist, most notable for his U.S.A. trilogy.

Born in Chicago, Dos Passos graduated from Harvard College in 1916. He traveled widely as a young man, visiting Europe and southwest Asia, where he learned about literature, art, and architecture. During World War I, he was an ambulance driver for the American Volunteer Motor Ambulance Corps in Paris and Italy, before joining the United States Army Medical Corps as a private.

In 1920, his first novel, One Man's Initiation: 1917, was published, and in 1925, his novel Manhattan Transfer became a commercial success. His U.S.A. trilogy, which consists of the novels The 42nd Parallel (1930), 1919 (1932), and The Big Money (1936), was ranked by the Modern Library in 1998 as 23rd of the 100 best English-language novels of the 20th century. Written in experimental, non-linear form, the trilogy blends elements of biography and news reports to paint a landscape of early 20th-century American culture.

Beyond his writing, Dos Passos is known for his shift in political views. Following his experiences in World War I, he became interested in socialism and pacifism, which also influenced his early work. In 1928, he traveled to the Soviet Union, curious about its social and political experiment, though he left with mixed impressions. His experiences during the Spanish Civil War disillusioned him with left-wing politics while also severing his relationship with fellow writer Ernest Hemingway. By the 1950s, his political views had changed dramatically, and he had become more conservative. In the 1960s, he campaigned for presidential candidates Barry Goldwater and Richard Nixon.

As an artist, Dos Passos created his own cover art for his books, influenced by the modernism of 1920s Paris. He died in Baltimore, Maryland. Spence's Point, his Virginia estate, was designated as a National Historic Landmark in 1971.

== Early life ==
Born in Chicago, Dos Passos was the illegitimate son of John Randolph Dos Passos (1844–1917), a lawyer of half-Madeiran Portuguese descent, and Lucy Addison (Sprigg) Madison of Petersburg, Virginia. His father was married at the time and had a son several years older than John. As a child, John traveled extensively with his mother, who was sickly and preferred Europe.

John's father married Lucy after the death of his first wife in 1910, when John was 14, but he refused to formally acknowledge John for another two years. John Randolph Dos Passos was an authority on trusts, and a staunch supporter of the powerful industrial conglomerates that his son expressly criticized in his fictional works during the 1920s and 1930s.

After he returned with his mother to the US, Dos Passos was enrolled in 1907 at the Choate School (now Choate Rosemary Hall), a private college-preparatory school in Wallingford, Connecticut, under the name John Roderigo Madison. His parents later arranged for him to travel with a private tutor on a six-month tour of France, England, Italy, Greece, and southwest Asia, to study the masters of classical art, architecture, and literature.

In 1912, Dos Passos enrolled in Harvard College, where he became friends with classmate e.e. cummings, who said there was a "foreignness" about Dos Passos, and that "no one at Harvard looked less like an American."

Following his graduation cum laude in 1916, Dos Passos traveled to Spain to study art and architecture. In July 1917, with World War I raging in Europe (but not in Spain), Dos Passos volunteered for the Sanitary Squad Unit (S.S.U.) 60 of the Norton-Harjes Ambulance Corps, along with friends Cummings and Robert Hillyer. Later, he also worked as a volunteer ambulance driver with the American Red Cross in north-central Italy.

By the late summer of 1918, Dos Passos had completed a draft of his first novel. At the same time, he had to report for duty with the U.S. Army Medical Corps at Camp Crane in Pennsylvania. On Armistice Day, he was stationed in Paris, where the U.S. Army Overseas Education Commission allowed him to study anthropology at the Sorbonne. Three Soldiers, his novel drawn from those experiences, features a character who has virtually the same military career as the writer and stays in Paris after the war.

== Literary career ==
Considered one of the Lost Generation writers, Dos Passos published his first novel in 1920, One Man's Initiation: 1917, which was written in the trenches during World War I. It was followed by the antiwar novel, Three Soldiers, which brought him considerable recognition. His 1925 novel about life in New York City, titled Manhattan Transfer, was a commercial success, and introduced experimental stream-of-consciousness techniques. Those ideas also coalesced into the U.S.A. trilogy, of which the first book appeared in 1930.

A social revolutionary, Dos Passos came to see the United States as two nations, one rich and one poor. He wrote admiringly about the Industrial Workers of the World, and the injustice in the criminal convictions of Sacco and Vanzetti, and joined with other notable figures in the United States and Europe in a failed campaign to overturn their death sentences. In 1928, Dos Passos spent several months in Russia studying socialism. He was a leading participant in the April 1935 First American Writers' Congress, sponsored by the Communist-leaning League of American Writers, but he eventually balked at the idea that Joseph Stalin, leader of the Soviet Union, would have control over creative writers in the United States.

In 1936–1937, Dos Passos served on the American Committee for the Defense of Leon Trotsky, commonly known as the "Dewey Commission", with other notable figures such as Sidney Hook, Reinhold Niebuhr, Norman Thomas, Edmund Wilson, and chairman John Dewey. It had been set up following the first of the Moscow "Show Trials" in 1936, part of the massive purges of Soviet party leaders and intellectuals in that period.

In the following year, he wrote the screenplay for the film The Devil Is a Woman, starring Marlene Dietrich and directed by Josef von Sternberg, both exiles from Nazi Germany. It was adapted from the 1898 novel La Femme et le pantin by Pierre Louÿs.

In 1937, during the Spanish Civil War, Dos Passos returned to Spain with writer Ernest Hemingway, whom he had met in Paris in the 1920s. However, his views on the Communist movement had already begun to change. Dos Passos broke with Hemingway and Herbert Matthews over what he considered their cavalier attitude towards the war, and their willingness to lend their names to deceptive Stalinist propaganda efforts, including the cover-up of the Soviet responsibility in the murder of José Robles, Dos Passos's friend and translator of his works into Spanish. (In later years, Hemingway would give Dos Passos the derogatory moniker of "the pilot fish" in his memoir of 1920s Paris, A Moveable Feast.)

Of Communism, Dos Passos later wrote: "I have come to think, especially since my trip to Spain, that civil liberties must be protected at every stage. In Spain, I am sure that the introduction of GPU methods by the Communists did as much harm as their tank men, pilots, and experienced military men did good. The trouble with an all-powerful secret police in the hands of fanatics, or of anybody, is that once it gets started, there's no stopping it until it has corrupted the whole body politic. I am afraid that's what's happening in Russia."

Dos Passos had attended the 1932 Democratic National Convention and subsequently wrote an article for The New Republic in which he harshly criticized the selection of Franklin Delano Roosevelt as the party's nominee. In the mid-1930s, he wrote a series of scathing articles about Communist political theory. In his novel The Big Money, he features a character who is an idealist Communist gradually worn down and destroyed by groupthink in the party. As a result of socialism gaining popularity in Europe in response to the rise of fascism and Nazism, there was a sharp decline in international sales of his books.

Between 1942 and 1945, Dos Passos worked as a journalist and war correspondent, covering American operations in the Pacific and the post-World War II situation in Frankfurt, Berlin, Munich and Vienna.

In 1947, he was elected to the American Academy of Arts and Letters. Tragedy struck the same year when an automobile accident killed his wife of 18 years, Katharine Foster Smith, and cost him the sight in one eye. The couple had no children. Dos Passos married Elizabeth Hamlyn Holdridge (1909–1998) in 1949, by whom he had one daughter, Lucy Hamlin Dos Passos (b. 1950).

His politics, which had always underpinned his work, moved to the right, and Dos Passos came to have a qualified, and temporary, sympathy for the goals of Joseph McCarthy in the early 1950s. However, his long-time friend, the journalist John Chamberlain, believed that "Dos always remained a libertarian."

In the 1950s, Dos Passos also contributed to publications such as the history magazine American Heritage, for which he wrote essays on Thomas Jefferson, the Marquis de Lafayette, Aaron Burr, and Robert Morris, the libertarian journal The Freeman and the conservative magazine National Review.

In the same decade, he published the influential study The Head and Heart of Thomas Jefferson (1954), about which fellow ex-radical Max Eastman wrote: "I think John Dos Passos has done a great service to his country and the free world by lending his talents to this task. He has revived the heart and mind of Jefferson, not by psychoanalytical lucubrations or soulful gush, but in the main by telling story after story of those whose lives and thoughts impinged upon his. And Jefferson's mind and heart are so livingly related to our problems today that the result seems hardly to be history."

Recognition for his significant contributions to literature came 30 years later in Europe, when, in 1967, he was invited to Rome to accept the prestigious Antonio Feltrinelli Prize for international distinction in literature. Although Dos Passos's partisans have contended that his later work was ignored because of his changing politics, some critics argue that the quality of his novels declined following U.S.A..

In the 1960s, he actively campaigned for Barry Goldwater's 1964 presidential campaign and Richard M. Nixon's 1960 and 1968 presidential campaigns, and became associated with the group Young Americans for Freedom. He also joined the Citizens Committee for a Free Cuba. He continued to write until his death in Baltimore, Maryland, in 1970. He is interred in Yeocomico Churchyard Cemetery in Cople Parish, Westmoreland County, Virginia, near where he had made his home.

Over his long career, Dos Passos wrote over forty books, as well as numerous poems, essays, and plays, and created more than 400 pieces of art.

== U.S.A. trilogy ==
Dos Passos's major work is the U.S.A. trilogy, comprising The 42nd Parallel (1930), 1919 (1932), and The Big Money (1936). Dos Passos used experimental techniques in these novels, incorporating newspaper clippings, autobiography, biography, and fictional realism to paint a vast landscape of American culture during the first decades of the 20th century. Though each novel stands on its own, the trilogy is designed to be read as a whole. Dos Passos's political and social reflections in the novel are deeply pessimistic about the political and economic direction of the United States, and few of the characters manage to hold onto their ideals through the First World War. The novel reflects the writer's sympathy, at the time of writing, for the Industrial Workers of the World (IWW) and his outrage at its suppression, for which the book expresses a deep grudge against President Woodrow Wilson.

== Artistic career ==
Before becoming a leading novelist of his day, Dos Passos sketched and painted. During the summer of 1922, he studied at Hamilton Easter Field's art colony in Ogunquit, Maine. Many of his books published during the ensuing ten years used jackets and illustrations that Dos Passos created. Influenced by various movements, he merged elements of Impressionism, Expressionism, and Cubism to create his own unique style. And his work evolved with his first exhibition at New York's National Arts Club in 1922 and the following year at Gertrude Vanderbilt Whitney's Studio Club in New York City.

While Dos Passos never gained recognition as a great artist, he continued to paint throughout his lifetime and his body of work was well respected. His art most often reflected his travels in Spain, Mexico, North Africa, plus the streets and cafés of the Montparnasse Quarter of Paris that he had frequented with good friends like Fernand Léger and Ernest Hemingway, as well as Blaise Cendrars, whose work he translated into English and who inspired him to use the montage techniques found in the U.S.A. trilogy.

Between 1925 and 1927, Dos Passos wrote plays as well as created posters and set designs for the New Playwrights Theatre in New York City. In his later years, his attention turned to painting scenes around his residences in Maine and Virginia.

In early 2001, an exhibition titled The Art of John Dos Passos opened at the Queens Borough Library in New York City. It toured to several locations throughout the United States.

== Influence ==
Dos Passos's pioneering works of nonlinear fiction were a major influence in the field. In particular Alfred Döblin's Berlin Alexanderplatz and Jean-Paul Sartre's Roads To Freedom trilogy show the influence of his methods. In a 1936 essay, "On John Dos Passos and 1919", Sartre referred to Dos Passos as "the greatest writer of our time."

American writer Mary McCarthy said that The 42nd Parallel was among the chief influences on her own work. In the television documentary, The Odyssey of John Dos Passos (1994), writer Norman Mailer said: "Those three volumes of U.S.A. make up the idea of a 'Great American Novel.'"

Science fiction writers have also been influenced by Dos Passos's works. John Brunner's "non-novel" Stand on Zanzibar (1968), which won the Hugo Award, features his technique of using fictitious newspaper clippings, television announcements, and other "samples" taken from the news and entertainment media of the year 2010. While influenced by Dos Passos's technique, Brunner's work was also inspired by emerging European literary theory on metafiction. Joe Haldeman's novel Mindbridge (2014) also uses the collage technique. His short story "To Howard Hughes: A Modest Proposal" (1974) explored a wealthy man reacting to the threat of war by wielding the power of private atomic reaction.

The British documentary filmmaker Adam Curtis says he has been inspired by Dos Passos and tries to incorporate his technique in film: "Why I love Dos Passos is he tells political stories but at the same time he also lets you know what it feels like to live through them. Most journalism does not acknowledge that people live at least as much in their heads as they do in the world."

In a 2018 interview, French director Agnès Varda spoke on her inspirations, "I learned a lot from reading. I learned editing from Dos Passos. I learned the structure of writing from Fontenay. I learned poetry from Prévert.

== Dos Passos Prize ==
The John Dos Passos Prize is a literary award given annually by the Department of English and Modern Languages at Longwood University. The prize seeks to recognize "American creative writers who have produced a substantial body of significant publication that displays characteristics of John Dos Passos' writing: an intense and original exploration of specifically American themes, an experimental approach to form, and an interest in a wide range of human experiences."

== John dos Passos Cultural Center ==
The John dos Passos Cultural Center, located in Ponta do Sol on the island of Madeira, is the municipality's main cultural facility, dedicated to literature and to the legacy of the Luso-descendant writer John dos Passos, as well as to the history of emigration. Through cultural programming and a Scientific Research Unit, the Centre promotes literary studies related to the author, while also housing a small museum with 19th-century domestic furnishings and photographs documenting the writer's visits to the birthplace of his paternal grandfather. It was inaugurated on 20 September 2004.

== Works ==
- One Man's Initiation: 1917 (1920), novel. Reprinted in 1945, under the title First Encounter
- Three Soldiers (1921), novel
- Streets of Night (1923), novel
- Manhattan Transfer (1925), novel
- U.S.A. (1938). Trilogy includes
  - The 42nd Parallel (1930), novel
  - Nineteen Nineteen (1932), novel
  - The Big Money (1936), novel
- District of Columbia (1952). Three-volume set includes
  - Adventures of a Young Man (1939), novel
  - Number One (1943), novel
  - The Grand Design (1949), novel
- Chosen Country (1951), novel
- Most Likely to Succeed (1954), novel
- The Great Days (1958), novel
- Midcentury (1961), novel
- The Best Times: An Informal Memoir (1966), memoir

== See also ==
- List of ambulance drivers during World War I
