= U.S.A. (trilogy) =

Series of novels written by John Dos Passos

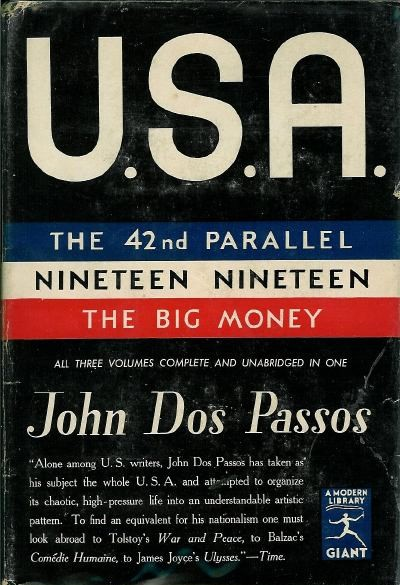
- First complete edition (1937)
- The 42nd Parallel (1930); Nineteen Nineteen (1932); The Big Money (1936)
- Author: John Dos Passos
- Country: United States
- Language: English
- Genre: Modernist, Political fiction
- Publisher: Modern Library
- Published: 1930–1936
- Media type: Hardcover
- No. of books: 3
- Website: www.johndospassos.com/usa

The U.S.A. trilogy is a series of three novels by American writer John Dos Passos, comprising the novels The 42nd Parallel (1930), Nineteen Nineteen (1932) and The Big Money (1936). The books were first published together in a volume titled U.S.A. by Modern Library in 1937.

The trilogy employs an experimental technique, incorporating four narrative modes: fictional narratives telling the life stories of twelve characters, collages of newspaper clippings and song lyrics labeled "Newsreel", individually labeled short biographies of public figures of the time such as Woodrow Wilson and Henry Ford and fragments of autobiographical stream of consciousness writing labeled "Camera Eye". The trilogy covers the historical development of American society during the first three decades of the 20th century. In 1998, the US publisher Modern Library ranked U.S.A. 23rd on its list of the 100 best English-language novels of the 20th century.

== Structure ==
=== Narrative ===
In the fictional narrative sections, the U.S.A. trilogy relates the lives of twelve characters as they struggle to find a place in American society during the early part of the 20th century. Each character is presented to the reader from his/her childhood on and in free indirect speech. While their lives are separate, characters occasionally meet. Some minor characters whose point of view is never given crop up in the background, forming a kind of bridge between the characters.

=== The Camera Eye ===
"The Camera Eye" sections are written in stream of consciousness and are an autobiographical Künstlerroman of Dos Passos, tracing the author's development from a child to a politically committed writer. Camera Eye 50 contains the arguably most famous line of the trilogy, when Dos Passos states upon the executions of Sacco and Vanzetti: "all right we are two nations."

=== Newsreel ===
The "Newsreel" sections consist of front page headlines and article fragments from the Chicago Tribune for The 42nd Parallel, and from the New York World for Nineteen Nineteen and The Big Money, as well as lyrics from popular songs. Newsreel 66, preceding Camera Eye 50, announcing the Sacco and Vanzetti verdict, contains the lyrics of "The Internationale. There are 68 newsreel sections of the whole novel, spread evenly. They rarely extend beyond one or two pages, their impact is thematic as much as it is grounding and sentimental.

=== Biographies ===
The biographies are accounts of historical figures. The most often anthologized of these biographies is "The Body of an American", the story of an unknown soldier killed in World War I, which concludes Nineteen Nineteen.

== Main characters ==
The 42nd Parallel

- Mac (Fainy McCreary) – A wandering printer, train-hopping newspaperman, and crusader for the working man
- Janey Williams – A young stenographer from Washington, D.C. (assistant to Moorehouse)
- Joe Williams – A rugged, slow-witted sailor, brother of Janey Williams
- J. Ward Moorehouse – A slick, influential public relations man
- Eleanor Stoddard – A cold, haughty young social climber
- Eveline Hutchins – Artist and designer, Eleanor's long-time friend and rival
- Charley Anderson – A gullible, good-natured mechanic and flying ace

Nineteen Nineteen

- Richard Ellsworth Savage – A Harvard graduate, employee of Moorehouse
- Daughter (Anne Elizabeth Trent) – A spirited Texas belle and volunteer nurse
- Ben Compton – A law student and labor activist/revolutionary

The Big Money

- Mary French – Dedicated labor activist and journalist
- Margo Dowling – Attractive, cagey and adventurous, eventually a Hollywood actress

== Analysis ==
=== Criticism ===
In his contemporary commentary on The 42nd Parallel and Nineteen Nineteen, Michael Gold noted their qualities as extensions of Dos Passos' techniques in his earlier novel Manhattan Transfer, and described these novels as "one of the first collective novels". Stanley Corkin has specifically expostulated The 42nd Parallel in the context of readings of Hegelian Marxism with respect to the particular historical time of the novel. Arnold Goldman has commented on the "progressive disenfranchisement" of Dos Passos from 20th century America in the trilogy. Justin Edwards has discussed the use of cinematic techniques in The Big Money. Donald Pizer has discoursed in detail on the passage 'only words against POWER SUPERPOWER' in The Big Money.

Janet Galligani Casey has analysed Dos Passos' treatment and development of the growth of his female characters in the trilogy. Stephen Lock has examined the cinematic ideas behind Dos Passos' use of the 'Camera Eye' sections.

=== Style ===
The separation between these narrative modes is rather a stylistic than a thematic one. Some critics have pointed out connections between the fictional character Mary French in The Big Money and journalist Mary Heaton Vorse, calling into question the strict separation between fictional characters and biographies. Coherent quotes from newspaper articles are often woven into the biographies as well, calling into question the strict separation between them and the "Newsreel" sections.

The first and last newsreels in each of the three books within U.S.A. tend to mirror each other, for instance, The 42nd Parallel begins with declarations that the 20th century will be shaped by America and its territorial expansion, juxtaposed to British struggles in the Boer War and dead soldiers in the Philippines. Nineteen Nineteen begins with an embrace of American capitalism following European exhaustion and turmoil after the First World War, and ends with descriptions of the Red Summer and Knoxville riot. Meanwhile The Big Money presents different sides of American capitalism, beginning with 'normalcy' and ending with the Wall Street Crash.

The fragmented narrative style of the trilogy later influenced the work of British science-fiction novelist John Brunner and American science-fiction writer Kim Stanley Robinson. It also influenced Jean-Paul Sartre's trilogy The Roads to Freedom.

=== Political context ===
The trilogy was written in the period when Dos Passos placed himself unequivocally on the political Left, before the major political shift which characterized his later career. Dos Passos portrays the everyday situations of the characters before, during, and after World War I, with special attention to the social and economic forces that drive them. Those characters who pursue "the big money" without scruple succeed, but are dehumanized by success. Others are destroyed, crushed by capitalism, and ground underfoot. Dos Passos does not show much sympathy for upwardly mobile characters who succeed, but is always sympathetic to the down and out victims of capitalist society. He explores the difficulty faced by winners and losers alike when trying to make a stable living for themselves as well as wanting to settle down in some means. The book depicts with considerable sympathy the activists of the Industrial Workers of the World. It is more reserved with regard to the American Communist Party which took the fore in the American Radical Left after World War I; though some Communists are depicted sympathetically, they are shown as caught up in the increasing bureaucratization of the party. The book expresses an obvious animosity to President Woodrow Wilson, depicting in detail his suppression of internal dissent during and immediately after World War I.

== Adaptations ==
The novel has been adapted a number of times, for purposes such as radio and stage production. Paul Shyre created a "dramatic revue", working together with Dos Passos. Howard Sackler also adapted it for a well-received 1968 audio production with Caedmon Books. Neil Peart of Rush was inspired by the trilogy to write the lyrics for the song "The Camera Eye" released on their Moving Pictures album in 1981, as well as the song "The Big Money" from their album Power Windows (1985). Margaret Bonds also collaborated with Dos Passos and wrote a musical theater work set to U.S.A. in 1959.

== Editions ==
Dos Passos added a prologue with the title "U.S.A." to The Modern Library edition of The 42nd Parallel and the same plates were used by Harcourt Brace for the trilogy. Houghton Mifflin issued two boxed three-volume sets in 1946 with color endpapers and illustrations by Reginald Marsh. The first illustrated edition was limited to 365 copies, 350 signed by both Dos Passos and Marsh in a deluxe binding with leather labels and beveled boards.
