= Three Soldiers =

1921 novel by John Dos Passos

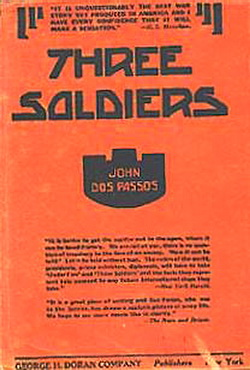
- First edition
- Author: John Dos Passos
- Language: English
- Publisher: George H. Doran Company
- Publication date: 1921

Three Soldiers is a 1921 novel by American writer and critic John Dos Passos. It is one of the American war novels of the First World War, and remains a classic of the realist war novel genre.

== Background ==
H. L. Mencken praised the book in the pages of The Smart Set:

"Until Three Soldiers is forgotten and fancy achieves its inevitable victory over fact, no war story can be written in the United States without challenging comparison with it—and no story that is less meticulously true will stand up to it. At one blast it disposed of oceans of romance and blather. It changed the whole tone of American opinion about the war; it even changed the recollections of actual veterans of the war. They saw, no doubt, substantially what Dos Passos saw, but it took his bold realism to disentangle their recollections from the prevailing buncombe and sentimentality."
