= List of ambulance drivers during World War I =

This is a list of notable people who served as volunteer ambulance drivers (VAD) during the First World War. A remarkable number—writers especially—volunteered as ambulance drivers for the Allied Powers. In many cases, they sympathized strongly with the ideals of the Allied Powers, but did not want, or were too young or old, to participate in a combat role. For women, combat was not an option at the time. Several of the Americans on the list volunteered before the United States' 1917 entry into the war. Many of the American writers would later be associated with the Lost Generation.

== Businessmen ==
- Tony Hulman – American businessman, owner and operator of Indianapolis Motor Speedway, and volunteer with the American Red Cross Motor Corps
- Ray Kroc – American entrepreneur of McDonald's Corporation fame – trained to become an ambulance driver, though the war ended before he saw action

== Composers ==
- Maurice Ravel – volunteer ambulance driver or truck driver
- Albert Roussel – Red Cross transport driver

== Filmmakers ==
- Julien Bryan – combat photographer, filmmaker and documentarian who volunteered with the American Field Service for the French Army in World War I, driving an ambulance in Verdun and the Argonne, and subsequently wrote a book Ambulance 464 about his experience illustrated with his photographs.
- René Clair – served as an ambulance driver in WWI before being invalided out for a spinal injury. Clair was deeply affected by the horrors of war that he witnessed and gave expression to this in writing a volume of poetry entitled La Tête de l'homme, which remains unpublished.
- Jean Cocteau – served in WWI with the Red Cross as an ambulance driver
- Walt Disney – volunteer American Red Cross Motor Corps, but served after the armistice ending World War I was signed
- William A. Wellman – served as a driver with the American Volunteer Motor Ambulance Corps (a.k.a. Norton-Harjes Ambulance Corps) in Europe. While in Paris, Wellman enlisted in the French Foreign Legion to serve as a fighter pilot becoming the first American to join Escadrille N.87 of the Lafayette Flying Corps.

== Writers ==
- Robert C. Binkley – volunteer United States Army Ambulance Service
- Robert Sidney Bowen – volunteer American Field Service in France, also served as a fighter pilot in both the Royal Air Force (RAF) and the U.S. Army Air Service during the war
- Louis Bromfield – volunteer American Field Service
- William Slater Brown – volunteer Norton-Harjes Ambulance Corps
- Malcolm Cowley – volunteer American Field Service
- Harry Crosby – volunteer American Field Service
- E.E. Cummings – volunteer Norton-Harjes Ambulance Corps
- Kati Dadeshkeliani – Russian Army ambulance driver
- Russell Davenport – U.S. Army Medical Corps
- John Dos Passos – volunteer Norton-Harjes Ambulance Corps
- Dale Van Every – volunteer, United States Army Ambulance Service
- Julien Green – volunteer American Field Service
- Dashiell Hammett – U.S. Army ambulance driver who was attached to the Norton-Harjes Ambulance Corps and was subsequently afflicted with the Spanish flu
- Ernest Hemingway – volunteer Red Cross Motor Corps in Italy
- Robert Hillyer – volunteer Norton-Harjes Ambulance Corps
- Sidney Howard – volunteer American Field Service
- Jerome K. Jerome – French Army ambulance driver
- John Howard Lawson – volunteer Norton-Harjes Ambulance Corps
- Desmond MacCarthy – volunteer British Red Cross ambulance corps
- Archibald MacLeish – U.S. Army ambulance driver, who later became an artillery captain
- John Masefield – served as hospital orderly in British hospital for French soldiers in France
- F. Van Wyck Mason – ambulance corps volunteer, who later joined the French Army and then the U.S. Army; grandfather Frank H. Mason was Chairman of the Ambulance Committee of the American Hospital in Paris
- Somerset Maugham – volunteer British Red Cross ambulance corps
- Charles Nordhoff – volunteer American Field Service
- William Seabrook – American Field Service
- Robert W. Service – British Red Cross volunteer
- Olaf Stapledon – Friends' Ambulance Unit volunteer
- Gertrude Stein – volunteer in France
- Hugh Walpole – Red Cross volunteer in Russia
- Amos Niven Wilder – American Field Service volunteer, later joined an artillery unit

== Other notable people ==
- A. Piatt Andrew – American economist and politician who served as Assistant Secretary of the Treasury, who was the founder and director of the American Ambulance Field Service during World War I
- Brooks Benedict – American actor of the silent and sound film eras who served with the American Ambulance Corps and in the U.S. Army Air Service during the First World War
- Frank Buckles – last American World War I veteran
- Marion Barbara "Joe" Carstairs – wealthy British power boat racer known for her speed and her eccentric lifestyle
- Stafford Cripps – British politician
- Hélène Dutrieu – pioneering French aviator
- Florence Jaffray Harriman – socialite and member of Wilson's commission on labor unrest, director of the American Red Cross Women's Motor Corps in France, and organizer of the Women's Motor Corps of the District of Columbia
- Pyotr Kapitsa – Russian (later Soviet) physicist, served on the Polish front
- Rotha Lintorn-Orman – British fascist
- Cathleen Mann – British artist
- Olive Mudie-Cooke – British artist
- Waldo Peirce – American painter, volunteer American Field Service
- Katherine Stinson - American aviatrix and, later, home designer in Santa Fe
- Alice B. Toklas – American member of the Parisian avant-garde of the early 20th century, and the life partner of Gertrude Stein
- Percy Toplis – notorious British deserter
- Harcourt Williams – English actor and director who served with the Friends' Ambulance Unit

== People who served the Allies in a related capacity ==
- Algernon Blackwood – British Red Cross Searcher, trying to identify dead or lost soldiers, British author
- A.J. Cronin – Royal Navy surgeon, Scottish novelist
- Fr. Teilhard de Chardin, SJ – French stretcher bearer, Jesuit priest, paleontologist, geologist, theologian, author
- Fr. Angelo Giuseppe Roncalli – stretcher carrier and chaplain in Italian Army, later elected Pope John XXIII
- Marjory Stoneman Douglas – American Red Cross volunteer, eminent American conservationist
- Dorothy Canfield Fisher – volunteered to help blinded Allied soldiers, American social activist and author
- E.M. Forster – interviewed wounded in Egyptian hospitals, English novelist
- Peter Grant – volunteer driver/mechanic
- Anne Green – volunteer work, author and translator, sister of aforementioned ambulance driver and author Julian Green
- Frederick Leney – British Red Cross Searcher, 1914–1916
- Alexander H. Rice Jr. – volunteer physician, explorer in South America
- Gertrude Stein – volunteer driver for French hospitals, American poet, playwright, feminist
- Ralph Vaughan Williams – stretcher bearer in France and Greece, British composer – Royal Army Medical Corps
- Edmund Wilson – American literary critic

== Ambulance drivers who served in other conflicts ==
- Patrick Barr – English actor who served with the Friends' Ambulance Unit in Africa during World War II. Barr also helped to rescue people in the Blitz in London's East End.
- Jean Batten – pioneering New Zealand aviator who made a number of record-breaking solo flights across the world, including the first solo flight from England to New Zealand in 1936. After she unsuccessfully applied to serve with the Air Transport Auxiliary during the Second World War, Batten joined the short-lived Anglo-French Ambulance Corps before it was disbanded when Germany conquered France.
- John Boulting – British filmmaker who served as an ambulance driver with the Spanish Medical Aid Committee during the Spanish Civil War and later as an officer in the Royal Air Force during the Second World War.
- Charles Fernley Fawcett – actor, filmmaker and professional wrestler who served in both Section Volontaire des Américains of the French Ambulance Corps and the American Ambulance Corps during WWII. Also during the war, Fawcett served in the Polish Army, helped Holocaust survivors escape while serving as a secret agent with the French Resistance, served in the Royal Air Force as a fighter pilot, and fought with the French Foreign Legion. Before the war, he served in the U.S. Merchant Marine. After WWII, he fought against the Communists in the Greek Civil War and later co-founded the International Medical Corps, a humanitarian aid organization that provides emergency medical services, healthcare training and capacity building to those affected by disaster, disease or conflict.
- Mahatma Gandhi – created the Indian Ambulance Corps for use by the British as stretcher bearers during the Second Boer War (1899–1902). The famed Indian lawyer and political ethicist also led the Corps during the Zulu rebellion in South Africa in 1906.
- Robert Montgomery – Academy Award-nominated actor who drove ambulances with the American Field Service in France during World War II until the Dunkirk evacuation. He later served as a lieutenant commander in the U.S. Navy and was decorated for bravery in combat during the Battle of Normandy.
- Kenneth More – BAFTA Award-winning British actor who drove ambulances (driver #207) in preparation for the outbreak of World War II. More later received a commission as a lieutenant in the Royal Navy and saw active service aboard the cruiser HMS Aurora and the aircraft carrier HMS Victorious.
- Patrick O'Brian – English author of Master and Commander who served as an ambulance driver during the Blitz in WWII. O'Brian also served in the Royal Air Force prior to the war.
- Lorenzo Semple Jr. – American screenwriter who served as an ambulance driver with the American Field Service in the North African campaign during World War II, and was awarded the Médaille militaire and Croix de Guerre for his service as a volunteer ambulance driver with the Free French forces in Libya. After being wounded in action in the Battle of Bir Hakeim, he returned to the United States where he was drafted into the U.S. Army, serving as an intelligence officer in Europe.
- Burt Shevelove – American musical theater playwright, lyricist, librettist and director who served as an ambulance driver during WWII.
- Robert Whitehead – Canadian theatre producer who served as an ambulance driver in North Africa and Italy during WWII.
- Nicholas Winton – British stockbroker and humanitarian who helped to rescue refugee children, mostly Jewish, whose families had fled persecution by Nazi Germany. Winton served as a Red Cross ambulance driver at the start of World War II and later served as an officer in the Royal Air Force.
