= AFS Intercultural Programs =

International youth exchange organization

- Formation: 1914; 112 years ago
- Purpose: Intercultural learning
- Headquarters: New York City, US
- Region served: Global
- Method: International exchange programs
- Volunteers: 40,000 (2015)
- Website: afs.org

AFS Intercultural Programs (or AFS, originally the American Field Service) is an international youth exchange organization. It consists of over 50 independent, not-for-profit organizations, each with its network of volunteers, professionally staffed offices, volunteer board of directors and website. In 2015, 12,578 students traveled abroad on an AFS cultural exchange program, between 99 countries. The US-based partner, AFS-USA, sends more than 1,000 US students abroad and places foreign students with more than 2,000 US families each year. As of 2022, more than 500,000 people had gone abroad with AFS and over 100,000 former AFS students lived in the US.

== History ==
=== World War I ===
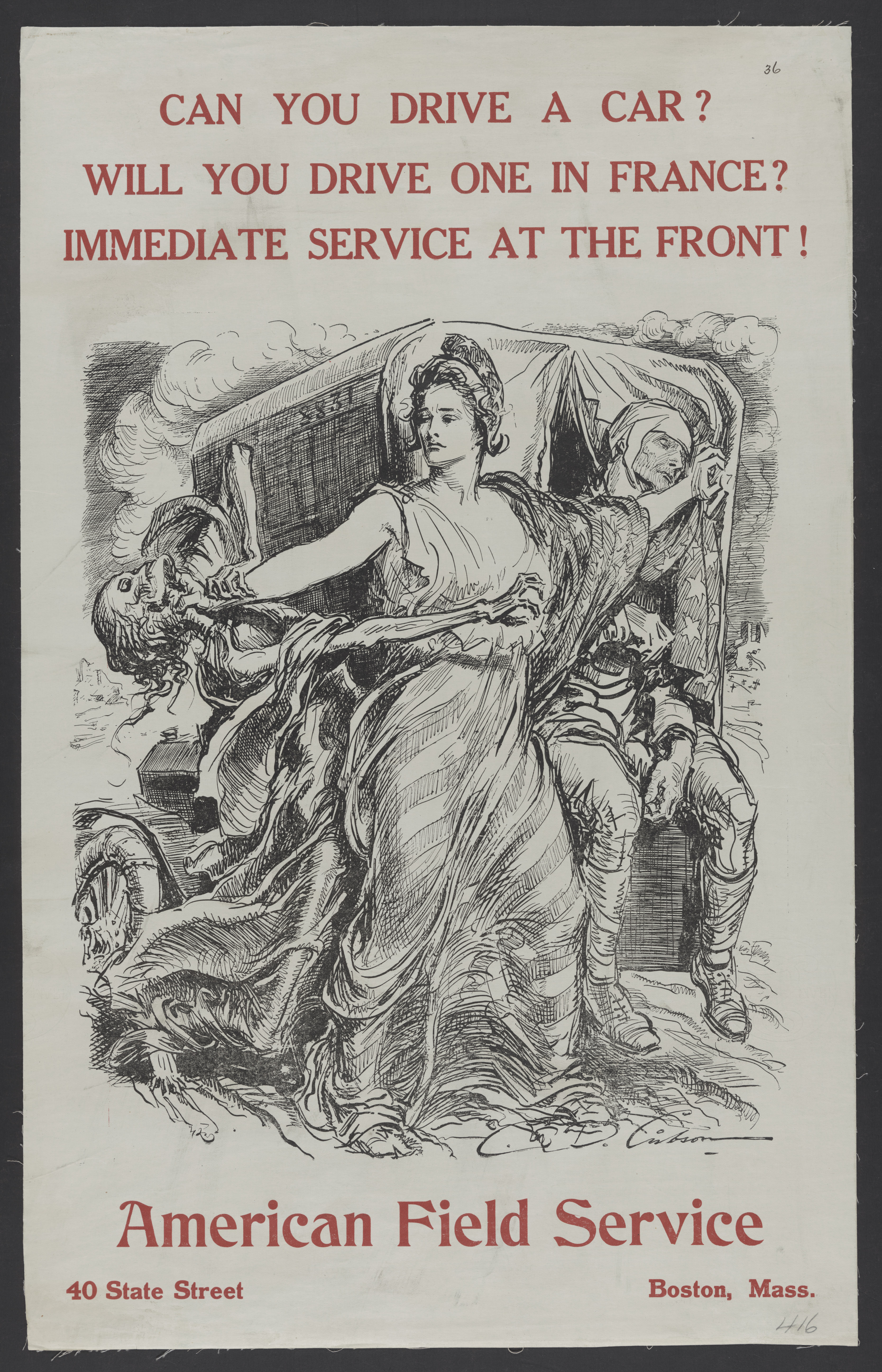
American Field Service poster

When World War I broke out in 1914, the American Colony of Paris organized an "ambulance"—the French term for a temporary military hospital—just as it had done in the Franco-Prussian War of 1870 when the "American Ambulance" had been under tents set up near the Paris home of its founder, the celebrated Paris-American dentist, Thomas W. Evans. The "American Ambulance" of 1914 took over the premises of the unfinished Lycée Pasteur in the suburb of Neuilly-sur-Seine—and was run by the nearby American Hospital of Paris.

The volunteer drivers of 1914 found themselves behind the wheels of motorized, not horse-driven, vehicles: Model-Ts, purchased from the nearby Ford plant in Levallois-Perret.

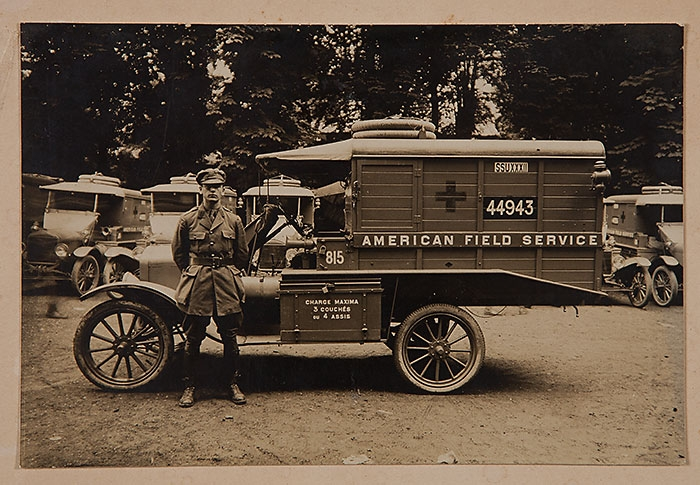
American Field Service ambulance

In the fall of 1914, when the war front moved away from Paris, the American Ambulance set up an outpost in Juilly and sent out detached units of volunteer drivers to serve informally with the British and Belgian armies in the north. In early 1915, one of those drivers, A. Piatt Andrew, was appointed "Inspector of Ambulances" by Robert Bacon, head of the American Ambulance and one of Andrew's colleagues from the Taft Administration.

The newly appointed inspector toured the ambulance sections of Northern France and learned that the American volunteers were bored with so-called "jitney work," transporting wounded soldiers from railheads to hospitals far back from the front lines. French army policy prohibited foreign nationals from traveling into battle zones.

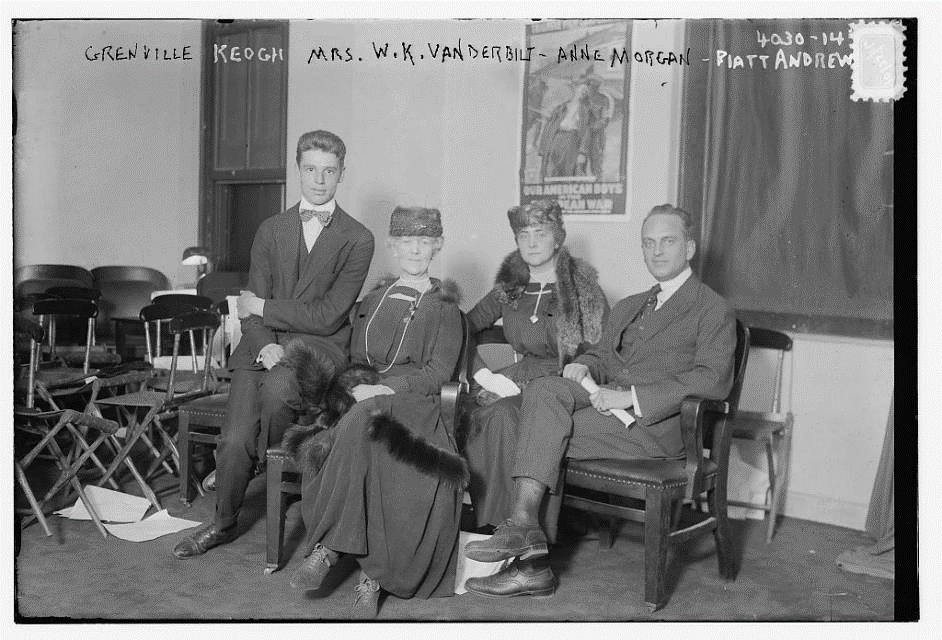
Grenville Keogh, Anne Harriman Vanderbilt, Anne Morgan, A. Piatt Andrew, 1916 (Grenville Keogh was an ambulance driver for the American Ambulance Field Service)

In March 1915, Andrew met with Captain Aimé Doumenc, head of the French Army Automobile Service and pleaded his case for the American volunteers. They desired above all, he said, "to pick up the wounded from the front lines..., to look danger squarely in the face; in a word, to mingle with the soldiers of France and to share their fate!" Doumenc agreed to give Andrew a trial. The success of Section Z was immediate and overwhelming, and by April 15, 1915, the French created American Ambulance Field Service operating under French Army command. Sections of about 30 drivers each were assigned to individual French Army divisions. The volunteer drivers at first joined for six months at a time; some received acting officer uniforms and ranks to work with the French officers that commanded the units.

This marked the formal beginning of American Ambulance Field Service, three units of which made their mark during battles in northern France, the Champagne, Verdun and the Vosges.

By the summer of 1916, the Field Service severed its ties with the American Ambulance and moved its operations from cramped quarters in Neuilly to Paris, onto the spacious grounds of the Delessert château at 21 rue Raynouard in the Passy area of Paris. There, it grew rapidly over the next year, continuing to provide "sanitary sections" to the French Army, while also serving as a recruitment source of combat pilots for the newly formed Escadrille Lafayette, one of whose prime movers, Edmund L. Gros, was the Field Service's in-house physician.

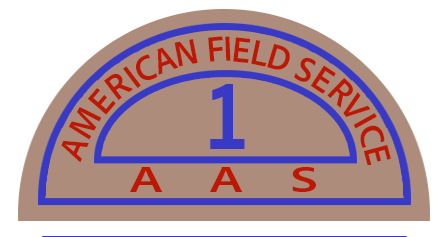
1st American Field Service Patch

By 1917 the Field Service had 33 ambulance sections with about 1200 volunteers total. When the United States entered the war in April 1917, the French Army successfully appealed to the Field Service for drivers for its military transport sections. Using excess ambulance volunteers that agreed to enlist in the French Army, the service established 14 transportation combat units with 800 drivers carrying ammunition and supplies. No longer limited to medical transport, the organization renamed itself the "American Field Service", thus establishing today's well-known acronym, "AFS".

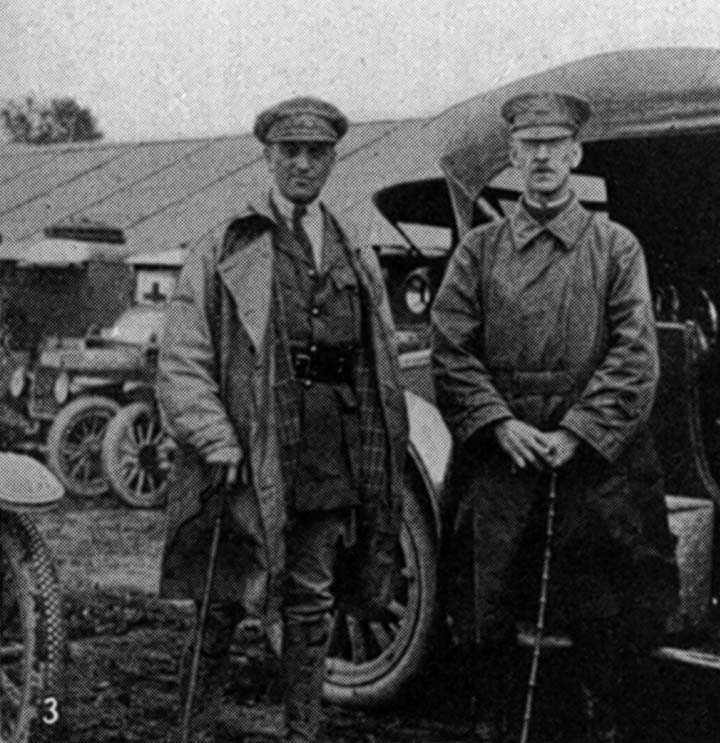
A. Piatt Andrew, director of the Field Service and Major Church, U.S.A., visiting in Champagne, 1917.

While American media described the ambulance and transport units as easy duty, many volunteered for AFS to join the fighting as fast as possible. Before the AFS was absorbed into the much larger, federalized U.S. Army Ambulance Service in autumn 1917 (many transport drivers joining the Motor Transport Corps), it had numbered more than 2500 volunteers, including some 800 drivers of French military transport trucks. It had actively recruited its drivers from the campuses of American colleges and universities, promoting morale by creating units with volunteers from the same schools. All financed their own uniforms and transportation to France where they worked under the same conditions as French ambulance drivers—with the same pay—and often found themselves serving under extremely dangerous missions on the Front. By the end of the war, some 127 men who had served with the AFS had been killed and a notable number of individuals and units had earned the Croix de Guerre and the Médaille de Guerre for their heroic actions as drivers.

Other volunteer ambulance corps served the French Army as "foreign sanitary sections" during World War I. The first was Henry Herman Harjes' "Formation" units under the American Red Cross, followed by Richard Norton's American Volunteer Motor Ambulance Corps, organized in London under the St. John's Ambulance (the British Red Cross). Later, both would merge —under the American Red Cross—as the "Norton-Harjes". In the summer and fall of 1917, when all the volunteer ambulance services were invited to join the new U.S. Army Ambulance Service, Norton's units simply disbanded, while Harjes’, under the American Red Cross, moved into Italy where they would subsequently serve under the USAAS.

Once the Americans entered the war, many drivers joined combat units, both French and American, serving as officers in a variety of assignments, notably in air force and artillery units. At the same time, a large percentage of volunteers signed up for the military, thenceforth members of USAAS units, but remaining identified with their AFS past—a past kept alive through the work of HQ, still at 21 rue Raynouard, where an American Field Service Bulletin was published and where visiting ambulance drivers could find temporary lodgings and meals.

==== World War I publications ====
The young AFS drivers came from "prominent families in the States," and had attended, or were still attending, one of almost 100 prominent colleges or universities around the country. Also represented were a smaller group from America's professional class: doctors, lawyers, architects, painters, brokers, businessmen, poets, and writers. This literate group produced many letters, diaries, journals, and even poetry. The AFS collected many of these writings into Friends of France, published in 1916. The Service used this volume to recruit more volunteers to the "gloriously exciting and grandly humanitarian" work of an ambulancier on the Western Front.

Also published in 1916, Ambulance Number 10, by Leslie Buswell, was composed of the author's letters back to the States. Buswell went on to assist Henry Sleeper in the AFS's recruiting and fundraising offices in Boston.

Other literary "ambulanciers" brought their letters and journals and memoirs to American publishers in the coming years. William Yorke Stevenson produced To The Front in a Flivver in 1917, stayed on in France after militarization, and composed From "Poilu" to "Yank" in 1918. Robert Whitney Imbrie published Behind the Wheel of a War Ambulance in 1918, as did Julien Bryan with Ambulance 464: Encore des Blesses.

The AFS recruits who joined the Service in late spring 1917, after Congress's declaration of war, were greeted by Piatt Andrew with a request: Would they forego ambulance driving for trucking supplies to the front? Eight hundred AFS recruits joined the camion service, including John Kautz, who published Trucking to the Trenches in 1918.

After the war the Field Service produced three hefty volumes of writings from numerous AFS alumni, including excerpts from the previously published books above.

=== Between the wars ===
Following the Great War, the AFS became sponsors for the French Fellowships—graduate student scholarships for study in France and in the US—which were ultimately administered by the Institute of International Education and were precedents for the Fulbright Foundation exchanges. AFS also created an association for its veterans, publishing a bulletin, organized reunions, and contributed a wing to house its memorabilia at the Museum of Franco-American Cooperation in Blérancourt, in northern France.

=== World War II ===
When World War II broke out, AFS reorganized its ambulance service, sending units first to France and then to the British Armies in North Africa, Italy, India-Burma and with the Free French for the final drive from southern France to Germany.

2,196 men served in the AFS during World War II. Twenty-five were sons of World War I AFS drivers. While US Army officers were paid $75 to $105 monthly, AFS drivers as unpaid volunteers paid at least $390 each year to serve; basic equipment cost $150, and at least $20 each month for other expenses. Families deposited money at AFS headquarters, and volunteers withdrew funds from AFS cashers in the field. AFS encouraged sponsorship of drivers, and in August 1943 began providing a $20 monthly living allowance. AFS favored the Dodge WC54 4x4 ambulance; each cost $2,000, usually paid by donation.

Seventy AFS Ambulance Drivers assisted the efforts of the British Army to liberate the Nazi Bergen-Belsen concentration camp in northern Germany in April and May 1945 with relief and evacuation operations. The drivers were deployed to the camp to mitigate a catastrophic typhus epidemic and severe overcrowding. They worked alongside British military personnel and medical students, for seven weeks in 10-hour shifts, to transfer survivors out of the highly contaminated main camp area. Their primary responsibilities included stretcher-bearing, administering basic nutritional aid, and organizing medical supplies. Over the course of the operation, the AFS units evacuated more than 11,000 concentration camp survivors to newly established displaced persons camps.

=== Postwar ===
In September 1946, Stephen Galatti, president of AFS, established the American Field Service International Scholarships. During the 1947–48 school year, the first students came from ten countries including Czechoslovakia, Estonia, France, Great Britain, Greece, Hungary, the Netherlands, New Zealand, Norway, and Syria. Students participating had to be nominated by their teachers.

== Modern day ==
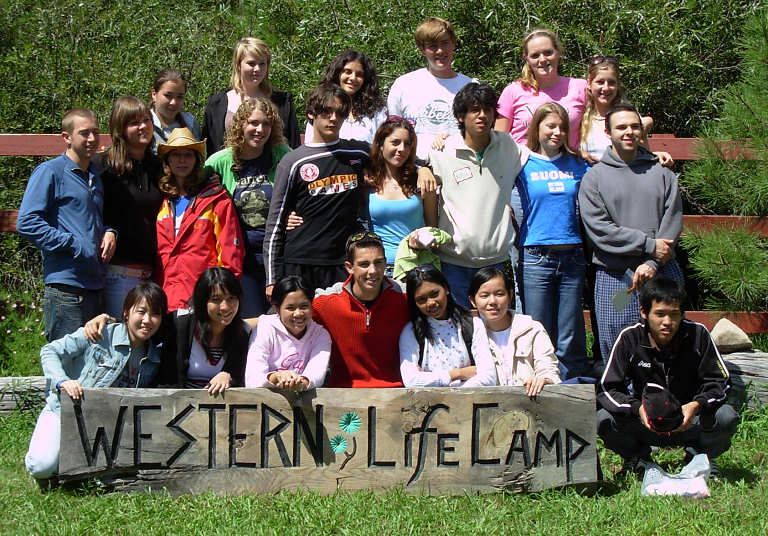
New Mexico Western Life Camp, AFS New Mexico Area Team (NMAT)

As of 2023, there were over 60 AFS organizations worldwide serving over 80 different countries, providing exchange opportunities for over 13,000 students and teachers annually. AFS is one of the largest volunteer-based organizations of its kind in the world with more than 50,000 volunteers worldwide and more than 5,000 in the U.S. Tens of thousands of volunteers and a small staff make the AFS program happen worldwide. AFS volunteers are both young and old, busy professionals and retirees, and students and teachers. AFS provides development and training opportunities for volunteers. AFS volunteers help in many areas including facilitating the AFS mission in the local community and schools by finding and interviewing students and families. Further involvement includes serving as a contact person for an AFS student, organizing fund-raising events, and arranging activities for AFS students. As a volunteer-driven organization, AFS depends on donations of time to implement and monitor the delivery of programs.

In 2025, AFS was designated as an undesirable organization by the Russian Ministry of Justice under the country's undesirable organizations law, banning its operations and criminalizing domestic cooperation with AFS.

=== EFIL ===
On a European level, the European Federation for Intercultural Learning (EFIL) serves as the umbrella organization for many AFS partner countries in and around Europe, including 26 AFS partner countries: Austria, Belgium (both Flemish and French organizations), Bosnia and Herzegovina, Czech Republic, Denmark & Sweden, Egypt, Finland, France, Germany, Greece, Hungary, Iceland, Ireland, Italy, Latvia, Netherlands, Norway, Poland, Portugal, Russia, Serbia, Slovakia, Spain, Switzerland, Tunisia, Turkey and Tunisia.

EFIL does not engage in active student exchanges between countries. Instead, it supports member organizations in the field of intercultural learning. The European Union and the Council of Europe are the organization's core partners for fundraising, policy-setting and sharing. The main activities include networking and advocacy, training and seminars for volunteers and staff, establishing new partner countries in Europe, and coordinating Europe-wide projects. It is a European Youth organization and an active member of the European Youth Forum.

== Statement of purpose ==
AFS is an international, voluntary, non-governmental, non-profit organization that provides intercultural learning opportunities to help people develop the knowledge, skills and understanding needed to create a more just and peaceful world.

== Notable AFS Ambulance Corps volunteers ==
- Colonel Francis J. Beatty
- Kirk Browning
- Julien Bryan
- Preston M. Burch
- Ward Chamberlin
- Tom Cole
- Malcolm Cowley
- Harry Crosby
- Patrick Dennis
- Sidney Howard
- Robert Whitney Imbrie
- Arthur Jeffress
- Jack T. Knuepfer
- John Howard Lawson
- J. Roderick MacArthur
- Robert Montgomery
- Waldo Peirce
- Irving Penn
- Lloyd Stephen Riford Jr.
- William Seabrook
- Bayard Tuckerman Jr.

== Notable AFS exchange students ==
- Diana Muir Appelbaum, American writer and historian (went to Chile)
- Jorge Argüello, Argentine Ambassador (went to the US)
- Dorothee Bär, German State Minister, member of the Board of Trustees AFS Intercultural Programs Germany (went to the US)
- Anies Baswedan, Indonesian Governor of Jakarta (went to the US)
- Shenna Bellows (born 1975), American Secretary of State of Maine (went to Brazil)
- Alfred Biolek, German entertainer (went to the US)
- Lee Bollinger, American, the 19th president of Columbia University (went to Brazil)
- Gabriel Boric, Chilean former president (went to France)
- Colin Bundy, South African Principal of Green Templeton College, Oxford (went to the US)
- Isabel Campoy, Spanish, became an American citizen, author of children's books, poetry, and pedagogical resources (went to the US)
- Catherine Coleman, American astronaut (went to Norway)
- Samantha Cristoforetti, Italian ESA astronaut (went to the US)
- Dixie Dansercoer, Belgian explorer (went to the US)
- Emma Dusong, French artist (went to the US)
- Klaus Eberhartinger, Austrian singer and presenter (went to the US)
- Jan Eliasson, former President of the UN General Assembly and Swedish Minister of Foreign Affairs, UN deputy secretary-general from 2012 (went to the US)
- Alfreð Finnbogason, Icelandic soccer player (went to Italy)
- Julio Frade, Uruguayan actor, radio announcer and pianist (went to the US)
- Cesar Gaviria, former President of Colombia (went to the US)
- Israel Hanukoglu, Turkish-born Israeli, Professor of Biochemistry and Science, adviser of the Israeli Prime Minister (went to the US)
- Yoshihiro Hattori, Japanese student (went to the US)
- İsmail Cem İpekçi, Turkish Foreign Minister (went to the US)
- Bill Irwin, American actor (went to Northern Ireland)
- Torbjørn Røe Isaksen, Norwegian Minister of Labour and Social Inclusion (went to the US)
- Ernesto Jerez, Dominican sportscaster (went to the US)
- Kenneth I. Juster, American Ambassador to India (went to Thailand)
- Zalmay Khalilzad, Afghan-American former United States Ambassador to the UN (went to the US)
- Jann Klose, German-born American singer-songwriter (went to the US)
- Christine Lagarde, French current IMF Director, former Minister of Economic Affairs, Industry and Employment of France (went to the US)
- Dawn Lindberg, South African folk singer, actress, theater producer, director and founder of the South African Naledi Theatre Awards (went to the US)
- Ulrike Lunacek, former Austrian member of the European Parliament (went to the US)
- David Madden, American quiz show champion and founder of the International History Bee and Bowl (went to Austria)
- Susana Malcorra, Argentine former foreign minister from 2015 to 2019, UN Chef de Cabinet to the Executive Office, Chief Operating Officer and Deputy Executive Director of the World Food Programme (went to the US)
- Margaret H. Marshall, American 23rd Chief Justice of the Massachusetts Supreme Judicial Court, and the first female to hold that position (went to the US)
- Patrick Mendis, Sri Lankan-born American diplomat, professor, author, US government executive (went to US)
- Milow, Belgian singer (went to the US)
- Nick Minchin, Australian senator (Liberal) from South Australia; later Minister of Finance (went to the US)
- Tim Noakes, South African professor of exercise and sports science at the University of Cape Town (went to the US)
- Tiina Nunnally, American author and translator (went to Denmark)
- Helmut Panke, German member of the board of directors at Microsoft (went to the US)
- Luca Parmitano, Italian astronaut (went to the US)
- Ruth Pearce, Australian professional diplomat (went to the US)
- Gerhard Pfanzelter, Austrian Ambassador to the UN (went to the US)
- Rogelio Pfirter, Argentine diplomat (went to the US)
- Édgar Ramírez, Venezuelan actor (went to Austria)
- Anneliese Rohrer, Austrian journalist (went to the US)
- Lieven Scheire, Belgian comedian (went to Iceland)
- Hans Schlegel, German astronaut (went to the US)
- Yasuhisa Shiozaki, Japanese politician (went to the US)
- Diann Shipione, American financial advisor and municipal pension system advocate (went to Sri Lanka)
- Salvador Sobral, Portuguese Eurovision Song Contest 2017's winner (went to the US)
- Renata Sorrah, Brazilian actress (went to the US)
- J. Christopher Stevens, U.S. Ambassador to Libya killed while serving (went to Spain)
- Shamcey Supsup-Lee, Filipina Miss Universe 2011 3rd runner-up (went to Japan)
- Ilona Szabó, Brazilian political scientist (went to Latvia)
- Mariya Takeuchi, Japanese singer-songwriter (went to the US)
- Ulrich Tukur, German actor (went to the US)
- Ron Underwood, American film director (went to Ceylon – now Sri Lanka)
- Linda Wells, American editor-in-chief (went to Turkey)
- Craig Wilson, American columnist (went to Great Britain)
- Penny Wong, Australian politician and Opposition Leader in the Australian Senate (went to Brazil)
- James Woolsey, American foreign policy specialist and former Director of Central Intelligence and head of the CIA (1993–1995) (went to Sweden)
- Herbert Wright, American screenwriter and producer, known as the ʻfather of the Ferengiʻ (went to Japan)

== AFS-USA, Inc. ==
AFS-USA, Inc. (a.k.a., AFS-USA) is the AFS partner organization in the United States and is a registered 501(c)(3) organization. Approximately 500 participants go abroad with AFS-USA annually. Over 1,000 international AFS students from other countries are hosted in the U.S. annually. AFS-USA is supported by a volunteer base of over 2,500. Study abroad programs range from two week group trips, to traditional year-long exchanges. Students on traditional exchanges live in volunteer host families, and study at a local high school. Other programs include community service, university classes, or language classes.

=== AFS-USA public diplomacy initiatives ===
Public diplomacy initiatives at AFS-USA offer support for international students to study in the United States and for U.S. students to study abroad via full funded scholarships by grant-making foundations or by the Educational and Cultural Affairs Bureau of the U.S. Department of State.

==== Congress Bundestag ====
The Congress Bundestag Youth Exchange Program (CBYX) was launched in 1983 by the U.S. Congress and the German Parliament. AFS provides 50 merit-based, full scholarships for U.S. students and 60 scholarships for German participants. In Germany it is called the "Parlamentarisches Patenschafts Programm" (PPP) and over the years the German authorities have made many efforts to present this as their "own program". Not only AFS Germany but all competitors are more or less behind-the-scene service providers so people may not recognize who is supporting this program in Germany. AFS hosts German CBYX students throughout the US, and administers the scholarship for US students located in the Northeast.

==== National Security Language Initiative for Youth (NSLI-Y) ====
The National Security Language Initiative for Youth (NSLI-Y) program is part of a broader government-wide presidential initiative that prepares American citizens to be leaders in a global world. NSLI-Y encourages a lifetime of language study and cultural understanding by providing more than 600 fully funded scholarships to American high school students.

As of 2023, NSLI-Y offered academic scholarships to learn Arabic, Mandarin Chinese, Hindi, Indonesian, Korean, Persian (Tajiki), Russian, and Turkish through summer and year-long programs in Jordan, Morocco, China, Taiwan, India, Indonesia, South Korea, Tajikistan, Estonia, Latvia, Kazakhstan, Kyrgyzstan, Turkey, and other countries around the world.

==== Future Leaders Exchange (FLEX) ====
The Future Leaders Exchange (FLEX) program originated in the Freedom Support Act, which was sponsored by U.S. Senator Bill Bradley and was passed by Congress in 1992. FLEX provides full merit-based scholarships to students from the countries of the former Soviet Union. As of 2023, students come to the US from a variety of countries in Eurasia including Armenia, Azerbaijan, Czech Republic, Estonia, Georgia, Greece, Hungary, Kazakhstan, Kyrgyzstan, Latvia, Lithuania, Moldova, Mongolia, Montenegro, Poland, Romania, Serbia, Slovakia, Tajikistan, Turkmenistan, Ukraine, and Uzbekistan.

==== Kennedy-Lugar Youth Exchange and Study (YES) ====
Kennedy-Lugar Youth Exchange and Study (YES) was initiated by the Department of State in the aftermath of September 11. It aims to build bridges of understanding between Americans and people in countries with significant Muslim populations. Students from over 40 countries come to the US for academic year programs. As of 2023, students came from the following countries: Albania, Bahrain, Bangladesh, Bosnia & Herzegovina, Bulgaria, Cameroon, Egypt, Gaza, Ghana, India, Indonesia, Israel, Jordan, Kenya, Kosovo, Kuwait, Lebanon, Liberia, Libya, Malaysia, Mali, Morocco, Mozambique, Nigeria, North Macedonia, Pakistan, Philippines, Saudi Arabia, Senegal, Sierra Leone, South Africa, Suriname, Tanzania, Thailand, Tunisia, Turkiye, and the West Bank. Countries that formerly participated include Algeria, Ethiopia, Yemen, Iraq, Oman, Qatar, and Syria.

The YES Abroad Program also provides scholarships for high school students in the US to spend an academic year in countries with significant Muslim communities, including as of 2023 Bosnia & Herzegovina, Bulgaria, Ghana, India, Indonesia, Jordan, Malaysia, Morocco, North Macedonia, Senegal, Thailand, and Turkiye. Former host countries include Egypt, Mali, Oman, Philippines, and South Africa.

=== AFS-USA scholarships ===
Scholarships awarded by the AFS were formerly known as American Field Scholarships.

AFS-USA awards financial aid and scholarships to students each year, including via the following programs:

- Global Citizens Scholarships and Aid is the primary AFS scholarship program, offering full and partial need and merit-based scholarships to qualified applicants for year, semester, and summer programs.
- AFS Family Scholarships are awards are given to applicants who are former host family members, returnees, children of returnees, and of descendants of AFS Ambulance Drivers.
- Yoshi Hattori Memorial Scholarship is a merit-based full scholarship for a year in Japan designed to promote intercultural understanding and peace, and was created in memory of Yoshi Hattori, an AFS Exchange Student to the US from Japan.
- Asia Kakehashi Project provides full scholarships for high school students to study in Japan.
- American Association of Teachers of French and AFS-USA Scholarship is a partial scholarship for high school students studying in the Francophone world.
- Numerous local scholarships are also available.

== See also ==
- Arosa Kulm
- Arosa Sky alias Bianca C.
