= Colonel Francis J. Beatty =

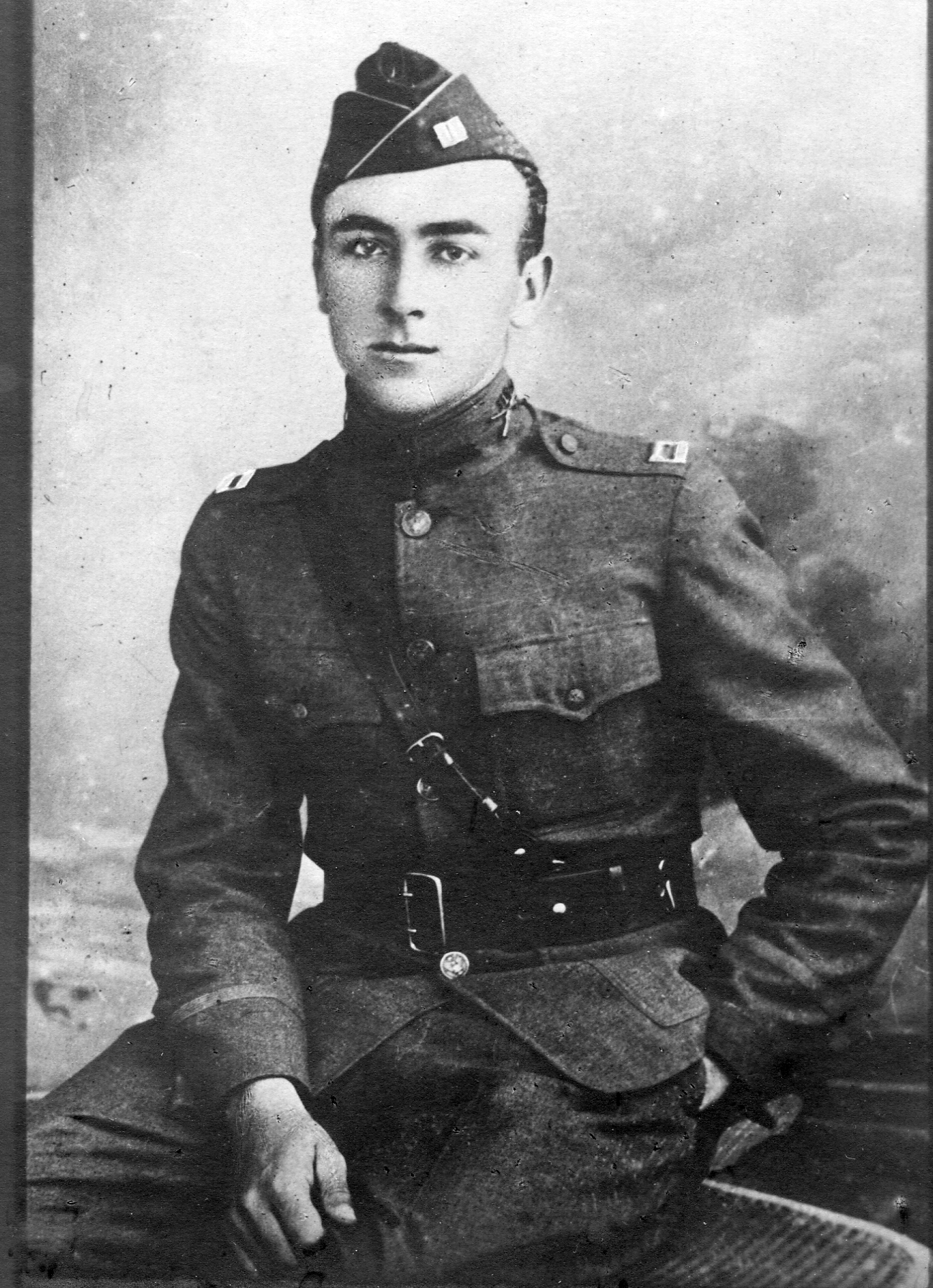
Francis J. Beatty during the First World War.

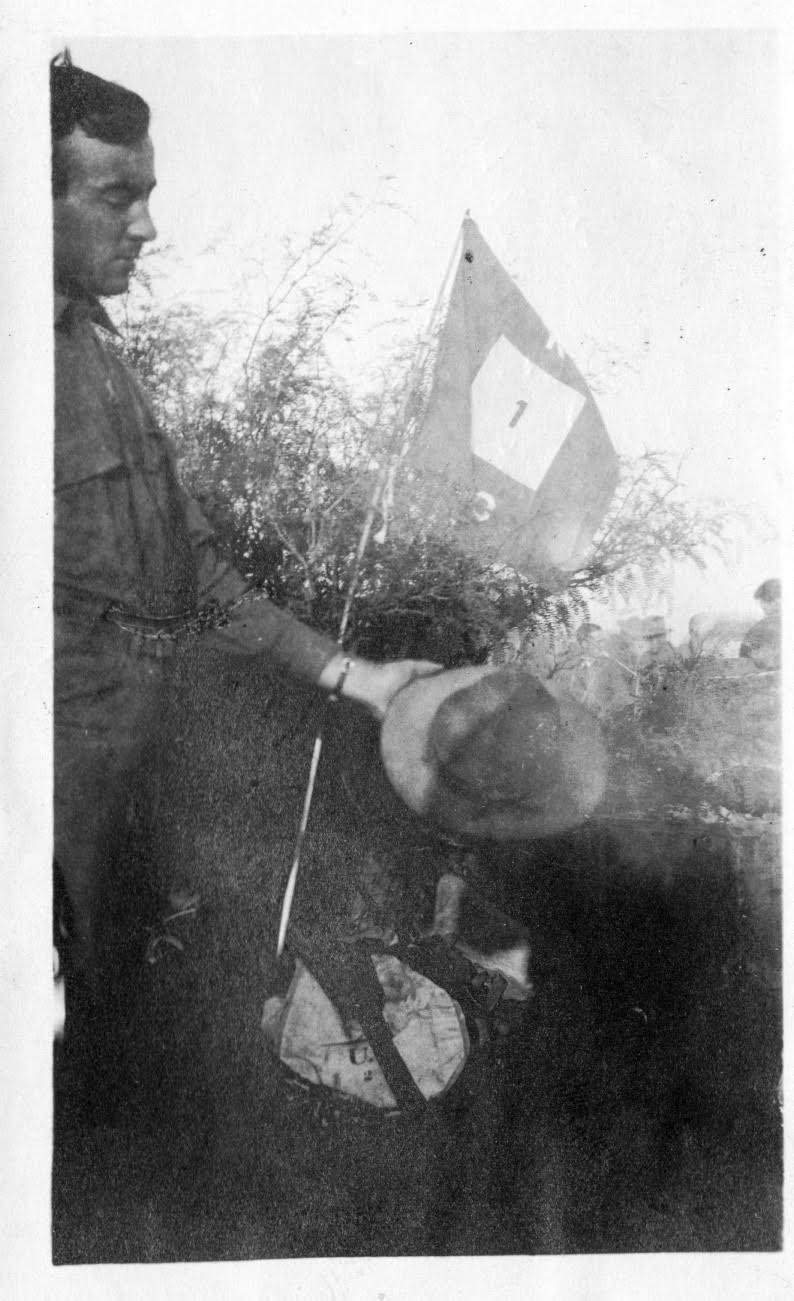
Francis J. Beatty during the Mexican Border War.

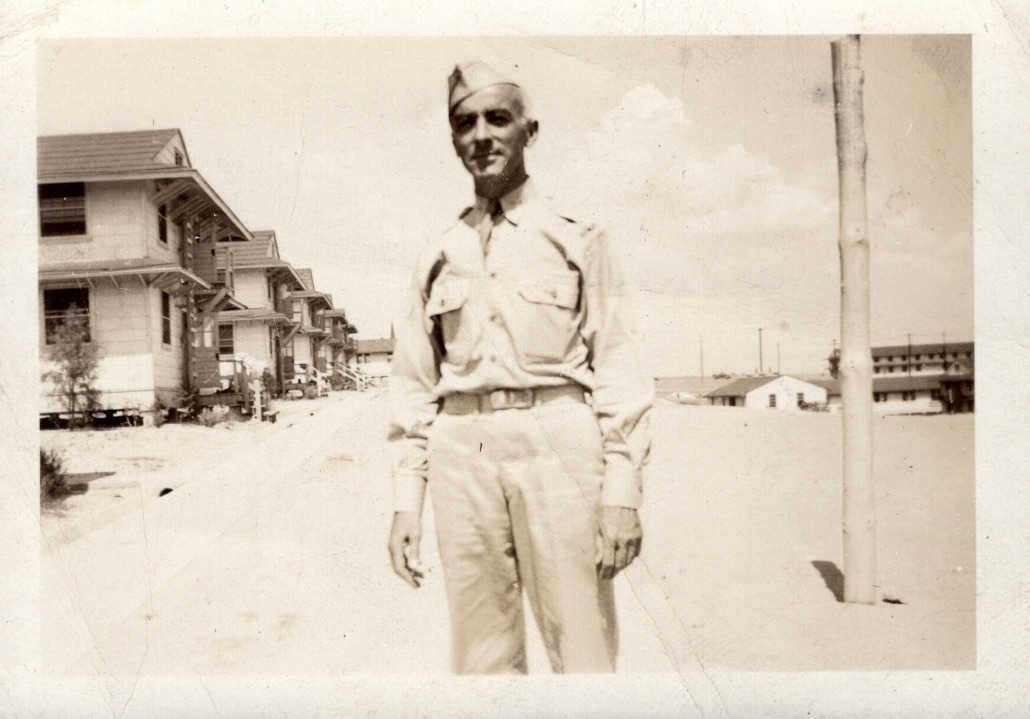
Francis J. Beatty, Camp Croft, SC

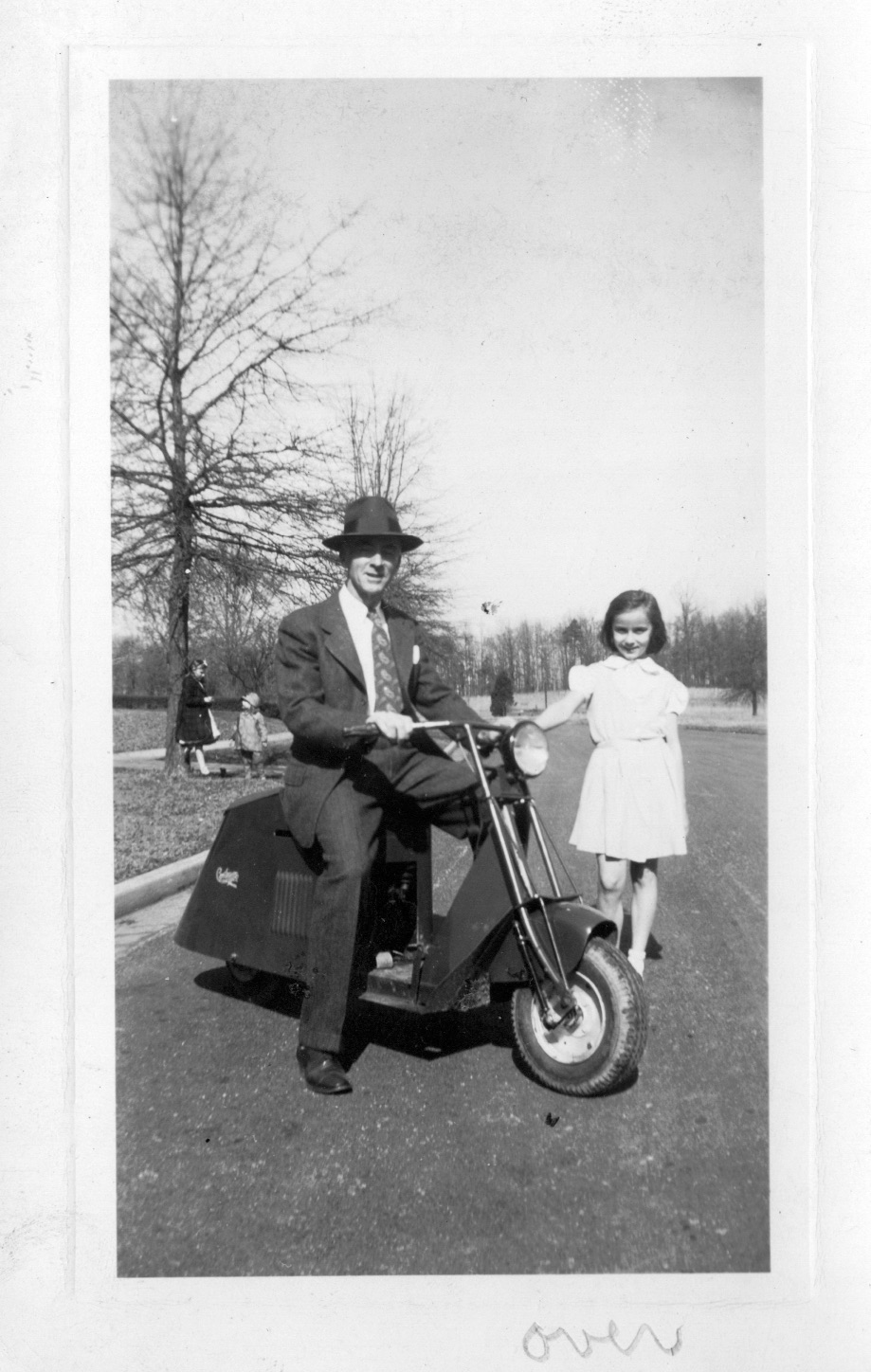
Francis Beatty with daughter, Kitty, early 1940's.

Colonel Francis Joseph Beatty (August 28, 1893 – January 19, 1983) was an American civic leader, cotton industry executive, and military officer. He played a prominent role in Charlotte, North Carolina’s business, religious, and philanthropic communities. He served in the Mexican Border War, World War I and World War II. (Note: Information in this article is primarily drawn from a biographical pamphlet published in Charlotte, NC.)

== Early life and family ==
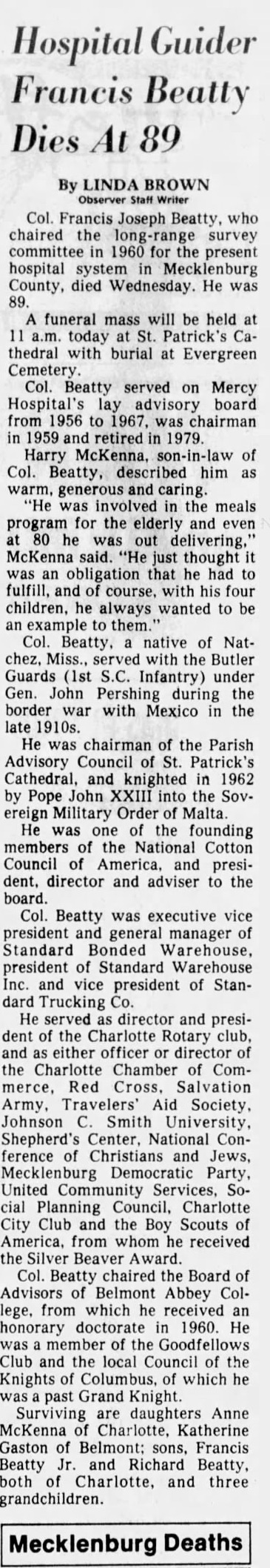

Beatty was born in Natchez, Mississippi, one of five children. His family moved to Greenville, South Carolina during his early childhood. Despite having only an eighth-grade education, he advanced through determination and skill in both business and military service.

He married Katherine O’Donoghue Williams, and together they had four children: Anne, Francis (“Skipper”), Richard (“Dick”), and Katherine (“Kitty”).

== Military service ==
=== Mexican Border Conflict and World War I ===
As a young man, Beatty volunteered for the U.S. Army during the Mexican Border War, rising from private to master sergeant. Following this, he worked in Germany in the cotton industry until World War I began. He left for Paris, where he joined the American Field Service, driving ambulances to retrieve wounded and dead soldiers from battlefields.

After the United States entered the war, Beatty returned to South Carolina, passed officer examinations, and was commissioned as a second lieutenant. He returned to Europe with the 30th Infantry Division of South Carolina, fought until the war’s end, and came home a captain.

=== World War II ===
When the United States entered World War II in 1941, Beatty was over the age of conscription but volunteered for service. After training thousands of young soldiers for combat at Camp Croft in Spartanburg, SC, he requested overseas duty and served as regimental commander of the 1st Filipino Infantry Regiment in the Pacific theater.

== Business career ==
Beatty’s career centered on the cotton industry. He was a founding member of the National Cotton Council of America, later serving as its president and chairman of the board. He also held leadership positions as president and director of the National Cotton Compress and Cotton Warehouse Association.

In Charlotte, he worked as executive vice president and general manager of Standard Warehouse, Inc., and as vice president of Standard Trucking Company.

== Civic leadership ==
Beatty served as president or director of numerous organizations, including:

- American Red Cross
- Salvation Army
- Johnson C. Smith University
- National Conference of Christians and Jews
- Mecklenburg Democratic Party
- Boy Scouts of America

== Religious and educational involvement ==
A devout Catholic, Beatty was chairman of the parish advisory council of St. Patrick’s Cathedral in Charlotte, North Carolina. In 1962, Pope John XXIII knighted him into the Sovereign Military Order of Malta in recognition of his hospital service.

He chaired the board of Belmont Abbey College, where he was awarded an honorary doctorate. He also led long-range planning for Mecklenburg County’s hospital system in the 1960s and served as director and chairman of the board of Mercy Hospital.

== Recognition and legacy ==
Beatty received many medals during his military career, and he was especially proud of the Expert Infantryman Badge.

After his death in 1983, Charlotte Observer columnist Kays Gary wrote: "Those who know him in the poetry of Dylan Thomas would protest, 'Do not go gently into that good night!,’ because the world must note and remember."

A public space, Colonel Francis Beatty Park, was named in his honor in Mecklenburg County, North Carolina by the Mecklenburg County Parks and Recreation..
