= Ward Chamberlin =

American television executive

- Born: 4 August 1921
- Died: February 23, 2017 (aged 95)
- Occupation: Public broadcasting executive
- Spouse: Anne Chamberlin (m. 1945; divorced)

Ward Chamberlin (4 August 1921 – 23 February 2017) was the president of the US TV channel WETA for fifteen years. During his career he was also executive vice president at WNET in New York and senior vice president for PBS. He retired from public broadcasting in 2003. Ward was one of the founders of AFS Intercultural Programs and is among the veterans featured in Ken Burns' documentary The War.
