= Anneliese Rohrer =

Austrian journalist

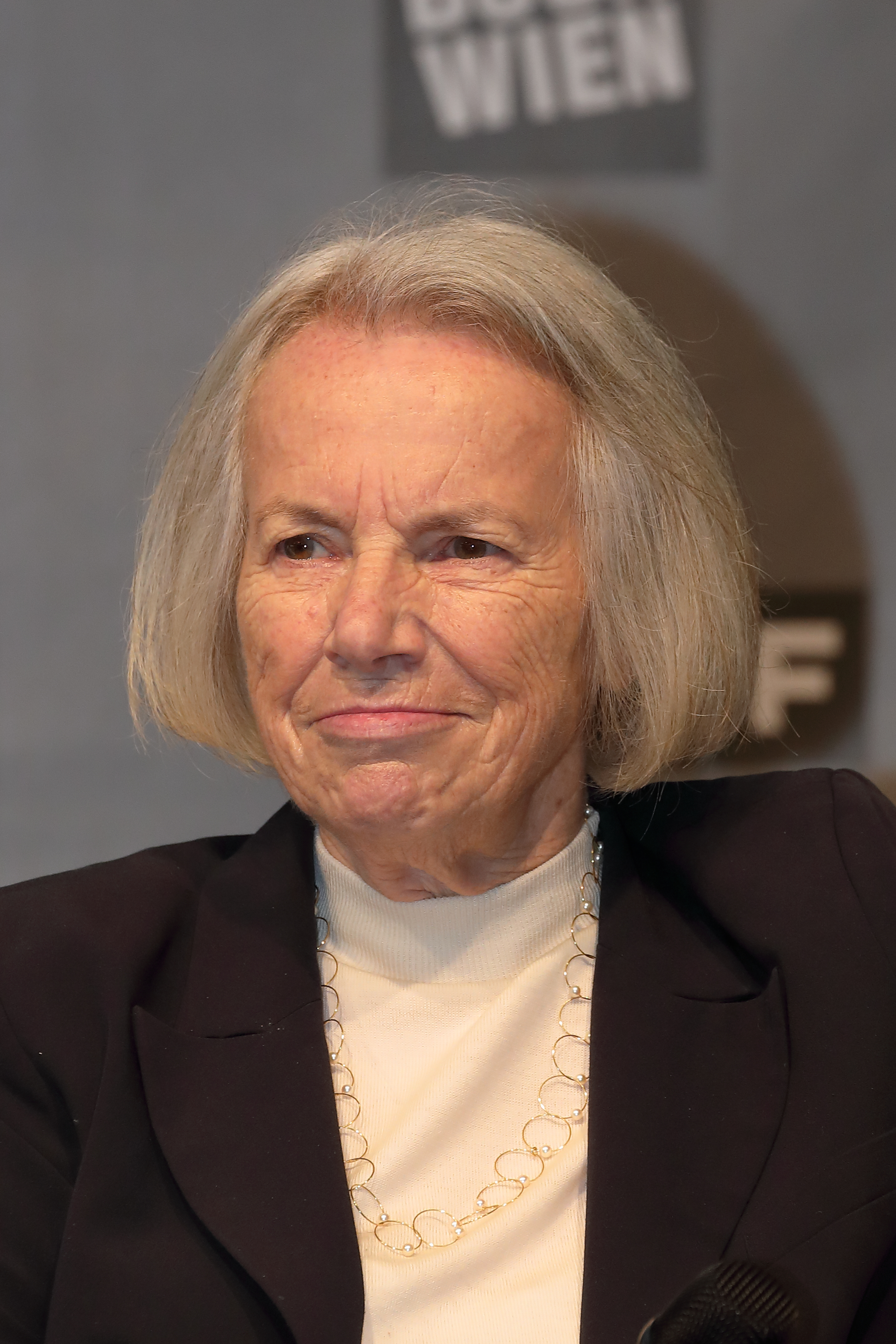
Anneliese Rohrer in 2018

Anneliese Rohrer (born September 24, 1944, in Wolfsberg) is an Austrian journalist.

== Life ==
She grew up as the middle of three daughters with her mother, who had taken over a furniture store in Klagenfurt, without a father – the National Socialists had fallen in Yugoslavia in 1944 – in Carinthia. After elementary school and grammar school and passing the matura in 1963, she received an American Field Service Scholarship in Toledo, Ohio (US). When she later returned to Austria, she studied law at the University of Vienna, but then switched to history and Doctorate (PhD) in 1971 Dr. phil. She then spent three years as a university assistant in Auckland. Back in Austria, she began working for the Austrian daily newspaper. Die Presse, in 1974. In 1987, she took over as head of the domestic politics department. After differences with the then editor-in-chief Andreas Unterberger, she moved to the foreign policy department in 2001, which she headed until her forced retirement from the newspaper in 2004.

In 2005, the book Charakterfehler: Die Österreicher und ihre Politiker was published. From 2006 to 2009, she wrote for the Kurier, where she commented on political events every Wednesday. Rohrer has been writing regularly for Die Presse again since 2010, until March 2016 in her blog Rohrers Reality-Check, since then in the section "Quergeschrieben".

In addition, she teaches journalism at the Fachhochschule Wien and sits on the advisory board of the monthly magazine Datum. Rohrer also became known to a wider public through her regular participation in discussion programs on Austrian television and the radio station Ö1. Due to her many years as a critical observer and commentator of domestic political events, Rohrer is often referred to as the doyen or grande dame of Austrian political reporting.

Anneliese Rohrer is the mother of the film director Katharina Rohrer and the younger sister of the actress Hanne Rohrer, who died in February 2022.

== Awards ==
- Kurt Vorhofer Prize (2003)
- Journalist of the Year – Lifetime Achievement Award (2011)
- Media Lioness for Lifetime Achievement (2012)
- Journalist of the Year in the category Columnists (2018, 2020 and 2022)

== Publications ==
- Ende des Gehorsams. Braumüller 2011. ISBN 9783991000617
- Charakter Fehler. The Austrians and their politicians. Ueberreuter 2005. ISBN 9783800070886
- 2018: The mother I wanted to be. The daughter that I am, together with Birgit Fenderl, Braumüller Verlag, Vienna 2018, ISBN 978-3-99100-255-0
