= Robert Whitney Imbrie =

American diplomat and murder victim (1883–1924)

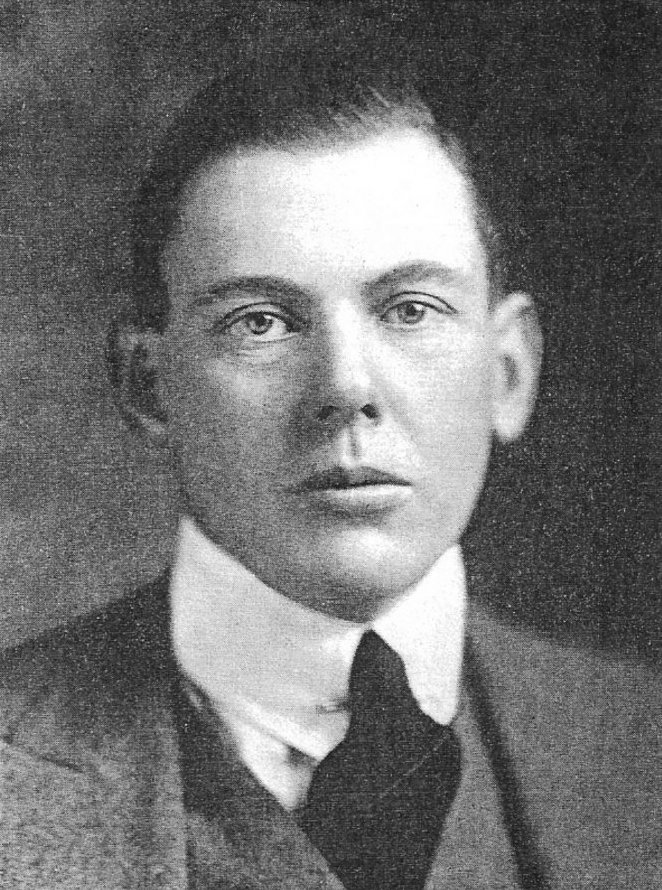
- University portrait of Imbrie, 1906

Personal details
- Born: April 23, 1883 or 1884 Washington, D.C., United States
- Died: July 18, 1924 (aged 40–41) Tehran, Persia
- Resting place: Arlington National Cemetery, Virginia, United States; 38°52′45″N 77°04′20″W
- Citizenship: American
- Education: Yale University (LL.M)
- Occupation: Officer of the United States Foreign Service
- Awards: Croix de Guerre (1917)

Military service
- Allegiance: France
- Branch/service: American Ambulance Field Service; Armée d'Orient
- Years of service: 1915–1917
- Battles/wars: World War I

Robert Whitney Imbrie (April 23, 1883/1884 – July 18, 1924) was an American diplomat who was the first officer of the United States Foreign Service to be killed while on assignment. He was murdered by anti-Baháʼí rioters during his posting in Tehran, Persia. Imbrie and another American man were pulled out of a caravan and beaten by a mob after they were accused of being adherents of the Baháʼí Faith, which has historically faced widespread and state-sponsored persecution in Persia and the rest of the Muslim world. Following the initial assault, they were taken to a police hospital, where more rioters broke in and beat him to death. Imbrie's murder led to Persian prime minister Reza Khan declaring martial law and his eventual toppling of the Qajar dynasty; Khan's role in the incident is controversial, as some of the assailants were members of the Persian Cossack Brigade, which was commanded by Khan both before and after the 1921 Persian coup d'état.

== Early life and education ==
Imbrie was born in Washington, D.C., on April 23, 1883 or 1884. He was the only surviving child of Jeremiah and Leila (Whitney) Imbrie. His mother died when he was six or seven; his father when he was twelve. Imbrie then came under the care of his maternal aunt and her husband, Mary O. and Charles Fishbaugh.

Imbrie attended Friends Select School, Central High School, George Washington University, (A.B. 1902; LL.B. 1905) and Yale Law School (LL.M. 1906). The topic of his master's thesis was admiralty law. In 1907 he was appointed attorney-in-charge of the Seaman's Branch of the Legal Aid Society in New York City. In 1908, Imbrie opened a law practice in Baltimore with Howard McCormick, who later served as a long-time professor of English at the United States Naval Academy.

Imbrie traveled extensively between 1906 and 1915, visiting the southwest U.S., Canada, Europe, and Gabon, West Africa. His guide to Africa was Richard Lynch Garner, who had been assigned by William Temple Hornaday, the director of the New York Zoological Society, to bring back a live gorilla, which he did.

== Military and diplomatic career ==
=== French service during World War I ===
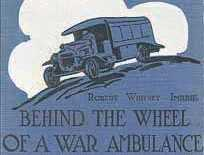
His memoir—Behind the Wheel of a War Ambulance by Robert Imbrie, New York: Robert M. McBride & Co., 1918.

In late 1915 Imbrie enrolled as a volunteer driver in the American Ambulance Field Service, which was part of the Automobile Section of the French Army. He served in France from December 1915 until October, 1916, when he transferred to the Army of the Orient in Macedonia. He served there until April 1917, when the United States entered the war.

Imbrie received the following medals for his wartime service—the Croix de Guerre, the White Rose Croix de Guerre, the Ambulance Medal, the Field Service Medal, and the Medal of Recognition for serving six months or more at the front. He was one of the longest-serving volunteer ambulance drivers in the war, seventeen months.

=== Diplomat in Russia ===
Because of his age and a recent bout with typhus, Imbrie could not enlist in the U.S. military; instead he joined the U.S. Consular Service and was sent to Petrograd. He arrived in November, 1917, in the midst of the Russian Revolution.

With the Treaty of Brest-Litovsk about to be signed, ending the war between Germany and Russia, the American legation moved north in late February, 1918. In April Ambassador David Francis sent Imbrie back to Petrograd, where he stayed for five months as the primary and at times the sole U.S. representative in the city. On August 30, Imbrie learned of his imminent arrest. With the help of the Norwegian embassy, he secured false papers and transportation out of the country.

=== Diplomat in Finland ===
In early 1919, Imbrie, then based in Viborg, Finland, began tracking the movement of the northern division of the White Army as it prepared to seize Petrograd and Moscow from the Bolshevik Red Army. In addition, Imbrie worked to provide food relief to thousands of Russian émigrés. After the fall of the White Army in the north, he left Finland in June 1920. By then he had been tried in absentia by the Bolsheviks and sentenced to death.

=== Diplomat in Turkey ===
Imbrie was next posted to Crimea, where the southern division of the White Army was active; however, when he arrived in Turkey in December, 1920, he found it, too, had collapsed. Instead, he was assigned to Constantinople under Admiral Mark Bristol, who headed the U.S. military and diplomatic missions in Turkey. After traveling extensively throughout the region doing reconnaissance, Imbrie left Turkey in July, 1921.

Returning to Turkey in March, 1922, Imbrie became the only U.S. official observer in Angora (Ankara), the seat of the new government of modern Turkey. There he met Katherine Helene Gillespie (1883–1968), an American relief worker caring for Armenian and Greek orphans of genocide and war. They married on December 26, 1922. Imbrie continued his reconnaissance work, befriended Mustapha Kemal, the new president of Turkey, and tracked American commercial interests in the area. In 1923, after Imbrie learned that a $40,000 bounty had been placed on his head, he and Katherine returned to the United States. On the way they stopped in Switzerland so Imbrie could brief the U.S. representative at the Lausanne Peace Conference regarding oil concessions in Turkey.

=== Diplomat in Persia ===
Imbrie's next post was to Tabriz, Persia (Iran); however, before assuming that duty, he was temporarily reassigned to Tehran when Consul Bernard Gotlieb went on leave. Imbrie immediately immersed himself in this new post as Persia struggled with both internal strife, involving politics and religion, and external pressures, including oil interests and foreign entanglements.

==== Anti-Baháʼí riots and murder ====
In early 1924, there had been several outbreaks of anti-Baháʼí violence in Tehran. On the morning of 18 July, Imbrie went to visit a well in the city's bazaar where it was alleged a man had lost his sight because of a sacrilege but had had it restored when he repented. Imbrie took a camera with him as he often did, his hobby being travel-writing and photography. Accompanying him was Melvin Seymour, an American roustabout, who was serving house arrest at the consulate.

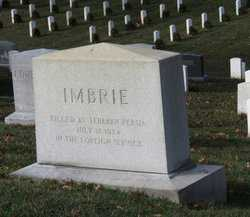
The Imbrie grave marker at Arlington National Cemetery. Photo by Jane Nelson.

Upon their arriving at the well, someone yelled that they were Baháʼí; another accused them of having poisoned the well. A crowd quickly gathered and chased Imbrie and Seymour, who managed to escape in their carriage. The mob caught up with them, however, when the carriage was blocked by a motorbike near the Cossack battery. There they were pulled from the carriage and beaten by the crowd. The police eventually intervened and took Imbrie and Seymour to the police hospital. Shortly afterwards, the mob broke into the hospital and again assaulted Imbrie. He died at 3:00 p.m.

Immediately, suspicion that Imbrie's murder was politically motivated fell on Reza Khan. Some of the attackers were members of a regiment of the Persian Cossack Brigade. Khan had led this brigade first as its commander and then, after the coup, as the Commander-in-Chief of the Army.

Imbrie was initially buried in Tehran on July 19, 1924. Imbrie's body was shipped home aboard the USS Trenton (CL-11), the first U.S. warship to enter the Persian Gulf, arriving in the United States on September 27, 1924. Among the notables attending his funeral services in Washington, D.C., was President Calvin Coolidge. Imbrie and his wife Katherine are buried at Arlington National Cemetery in Virginia.

Hours after Imbrie's death, Reza Khan, then prime minister as well as minister of war, declared martial law and used the murder as an excuse to consolidate his power. According to Major Sherman Miles, a United States Army General Staff officer sent to Tehran to investigate, the murder was deliberate. Miles concluded that the anti-Bahai rioting in Tehran was intended by the Iranian government to end in the death of a foreigner. Reza Khan wanted a foreigner to die "so that he could declare martial law and check the power of the Mullahs."

== Aftermath of death ==
The U.S. State Department and especially the consulate in Tehran worked to bring the guilty parties to justice. However, when three people were executed (two teenagers and an army private), U.S. officials believed that justice had failed. Meanwhile, Imbrie's widow sought what she considered adequate indemnity for her husband's death, a legal battle that lasted for over 25 years. In 1950 the $70,000 indemnity that Persia had paid the United States was folded into a fund to educate foreign students.

== See also ==
- Attacks on the United States
