= Charles Eliot Norton =

American author, social critic and art professor (1827–1908)

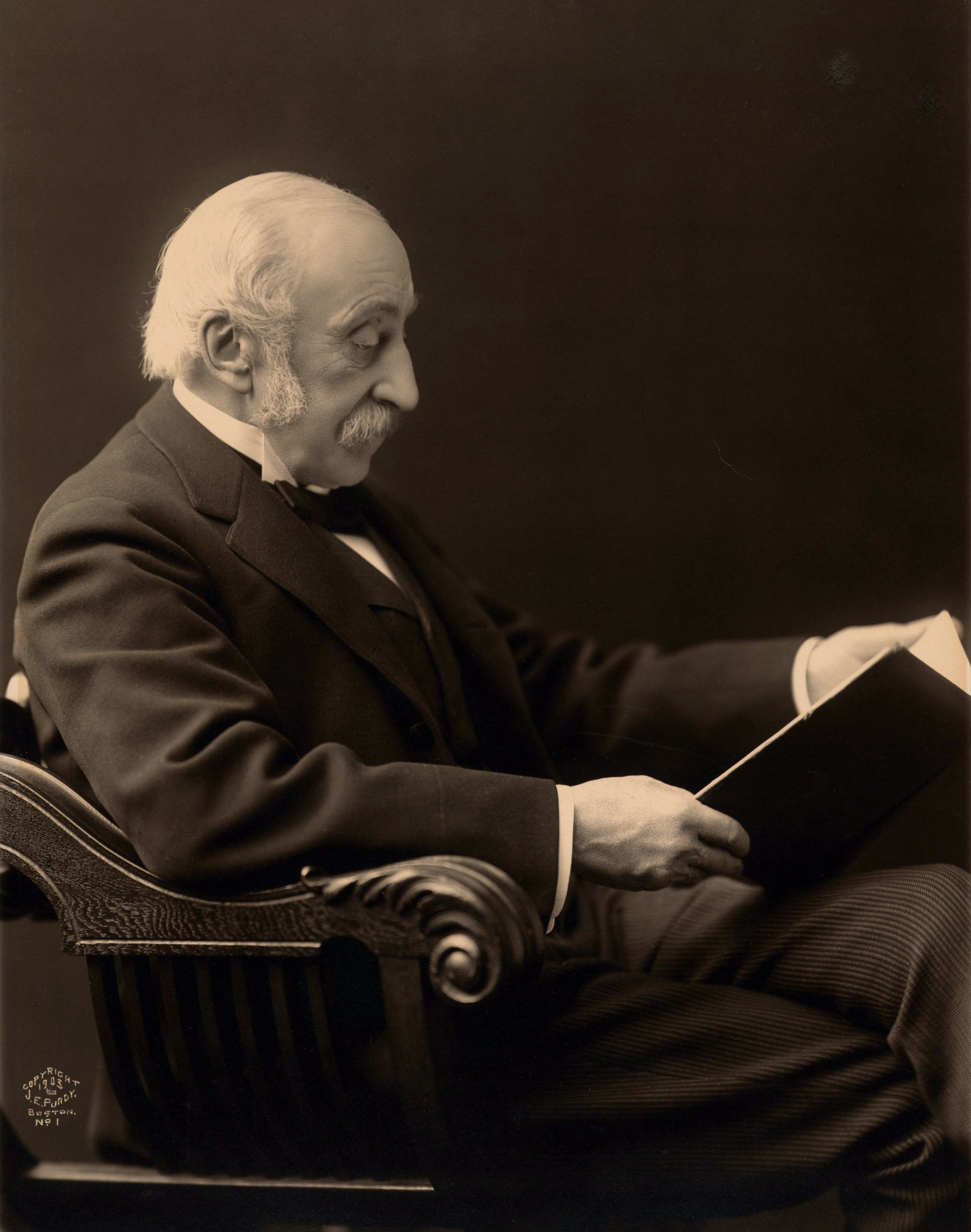
- Charles Eliot Norton, 1903
- Born: November 16, 1827; Cambridge, Massachusetts, U.S.
- Died: October 21, 1908 (aged 80); Cambridge, Massachusetts, U.S.
- Resting place: Mount Auburn Cemetery, Cambridge; 42.3708°N 71.1458°W
- Education: Harvard University
- Occupations: Professor, literary scholar

Charles Eliot Norton (November 16, 1827 – October 21, 1908) was an American author, social critic, and Harvard professor of art based in New England. He was a progressive social reformer and a liberal activist whom many of his contemporaries considered the most cultivated man in the United States. He was from the same notable Eliot family as the 20th-century poet T. S. Eliot, who made his career in the United Kingdom.

== Early life ==
Norton was born in 1827 in Cambridge, Massachusetts. His father, Andrews Norton (1786–1853), was a Unitarian theologian, and Dexter professor of sacred literature at Harvard; his mother was Catherine Eliot, a daughter of the merchant Samuel Eliot. Charles William Eliot, president of Harvard, was his cousin. Norton graduated from Harvard in 1846, where he was a member of the Hasty Pudding, and started in business with an East Indian trading firm in Boston, traveling to India in 1849.

After a tour in Europe, where he was influenced by John Ruskin and pre-Raphaelite painters, he returned to Boston in 1851, and devoted himself to literature and art. He translated Dante's Vita Nuova (1860 and 1867) and the Divina Commedia (1891-91-92, 3 vols, 1902 being the publication year of Norton's thorough final edit). He worked tirelessly as secretary to the Loyal Publication Society during the Civil War, communicating with newspaper editors across the country. These included journalist Jonathan Baxter Harrison, who became a lifelong friend.

From 1864 to 1868, he edited the highly influential magazine North American Review, in association with James Russell Lowell. In 1861 he and Lowell had helped Henry Wadsworth Longfellow in his translation of Dante and in the starting of the informal Dante Club.

== Marriage and family life ==
In 1862 Norton, at the age of 35, married 24-year-old Susan Ridley Sedgwick (21 February 1838 – 17 February 1872), daughter of Theodore Sedgwick III and Sara Morgan Ashburner. They had six children together: Eliot (1863), Sarah (1864), Elizabeth (1866), Rupert (1867), Margaret (1870) and Richard (1872). Susan died at age thirty-three in Dresden, Germany, following the birth of their sixth child.

== Concept of Western civilization ==
According to Turner (1999), "Probably only someone with Norton’s experiences and scholarly range – who had written about the Mound Builders, roamed India, organized classical archaeology, scoured medieval archives, published nineteenth-century painting – could have concocted Western Civilization. And only then if he had filtered these materials through the sieve of college teaching during years of curricular anarchy. For Western civilization had a scholarly and pedagogical specificity about it."

== Travel and friendships ==
From 1855 to 1874 Norton spent much time in travel and residence on the continent of Europe and in England. During this period, he began friendships with Thomas Carlyle, John Ruskin, Edward FitzGerald and Leslie Stephen, an intimacy which did much to bring American and English men of letters into close personal relation.

Another friend was John Lockwood Kipling, father of Rudyard Kipling. Father and son visited Norton in Boston; the younger Kipling recalled the visit years later in his autobiography:

We visited at Boston [my father's] old friend, Charles Eliot Norton of Harvard, whose daughters I had known at The Grange in my boyhood and since. They were Brahmins of the Boston Brahmins, living delightfully, but Norton himself, full of forebodings as to the future of his land’s soul, felt the established earth sliding under him, as horses feel coming earth-tremors. ... Norton spoke of Emerson and Wendell Holmes and Longfellow and the Alcotts and other influences of the past as we returned to his library, and he browsed aloud among his books; for he was a scholar among scholars.

Norton was elected a Fellow of the American Academy of Arts and Sciences in 1860. He began teaching at Harvard in 1874. In 1875, he was appointed professor of the history of art at Harvard, a chair which was created for him and which he held until retirement in 1898. He "centered his teaching upon the golden ages of art history -- classical Athens, the Italian Gothic style of Venetian architecture, and the Florence of the early Renaissance."

The Archaeological Institute of America chose him as its first president (1879–1890).

Norton had a peculiar genius for friendship. He is notable for his personal influence rather than for his literary productions. In 1881 he inaugurated the Dante Society, whose first presidents were Longfellow, Lowell, and Norton himself. From 1882 onward he confined himself to the study of Dante, his professorial duties, and the editing and publication of the literary memorials of many of his friends.

In 1883 he published the Letters of Carlyle and Emerson; in 1886, 1887 and 1888, Carlyle's Letters and Reminiscences; in 1894, the Orations and Addresses of George William Curtis and the Letters of Lowell. Norton was appointed as Ruskin's literary executor, and he wrote various introductions for the American "Brantwood" edition of Ruskin's works.

His other publications include Notes of Travel and Study in Italy (1859), and an Historical Study of Church-building in the Middle Ages: Venice, Siena, Florence (1880). He organized exhibitions of the drawings of J. M. W. Turner (1874) and of Ruskin (1879), for which he compiled the catalogues. In 1886, he opposed the opening of a "drinking saloon" on the main street near his home, in a letter which reveals little empathy for, or understanding of the significance of, Irish immigration to Cambridge in that era. Like his friend Ruskin, Norton believed one of the best things one could do for working-class people was to give them opportunities to gain satisfaction by engaging in workmanship, as opposed to monotonous routine labor where they have to work like machines. T. J. Jackson Lears has described Norton as the foremost American proponent of the Arts and Crafts movement. Norton was a founding member of The Society of Arts and Crafts of Boston.

== Later years ==
In 1881 he helped found the American School of Classical Studies in Athens. During the first years of the twentieth century, Norton spoke out in favor of legalized euthanasia. He lent his name to a movement led by Ohio socialite Anna S. Hall to pass physician-assisted suicide legislation in Ohio and Iowa. Norton died at "Shady Hill," the house where he had been born, on October 21, 1908, and was buried at Mount Auburn Cemetery.

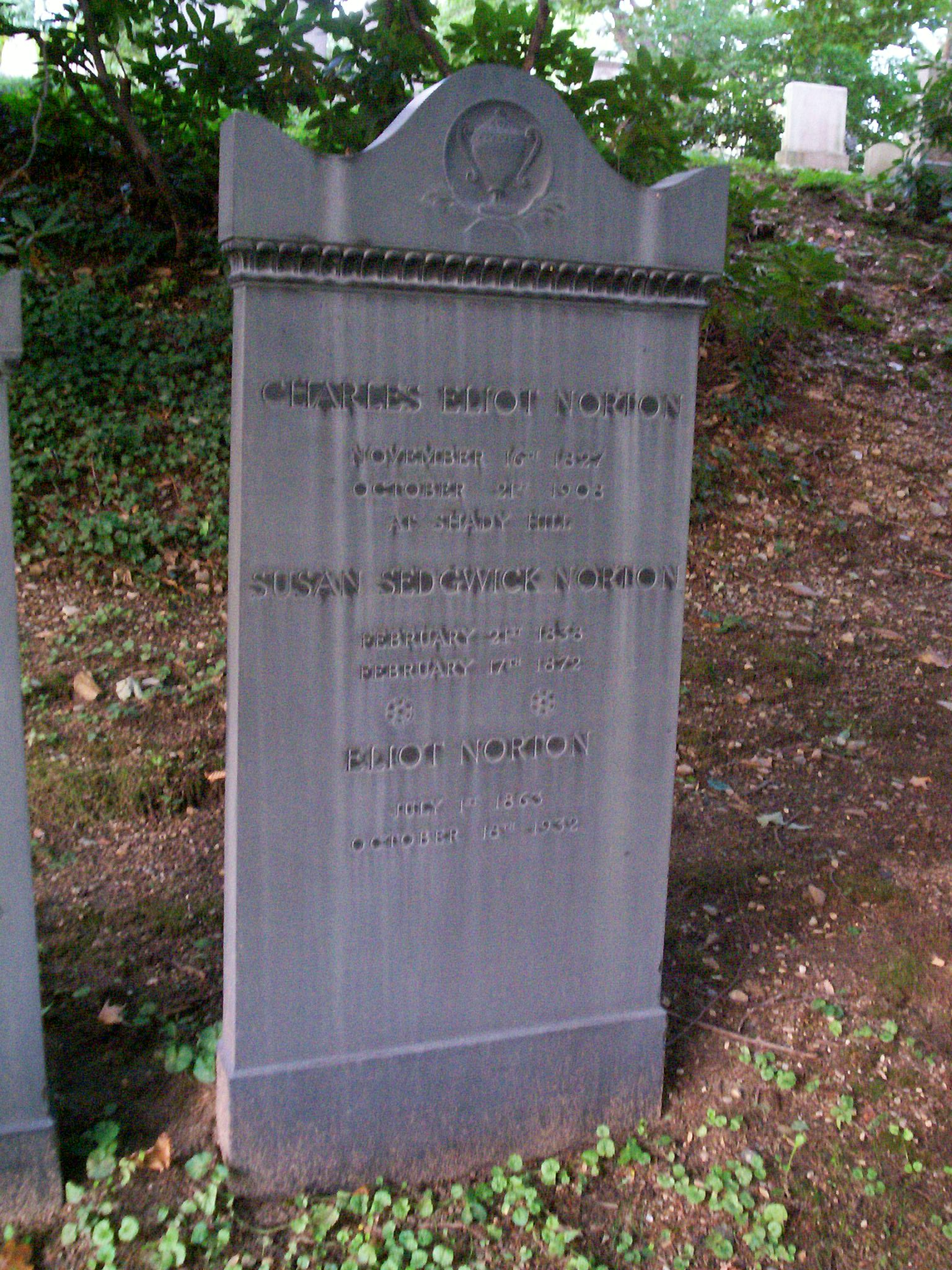
Grave of Charles Eliot Norton

== Legacy ==
Norton was widely admired for the breadth of his intellectual interests, remarkable scholarship and interest in the common good. He was awarded the honorary degrees of Litt.D. (Cambridge) and D.C.L. (Oxford), as well as the L.H.D. from Columbia and the LL.D. from both Harvard and Yale. One of his many students at Harvard was James Loeb, who in 1907 created the "Charles Eliot Norton Memorial Lectureship" in archaeology. The Charles Eliot Norton Lectures are given annually by distinguished professors at Harvard. Norton bequeathed the more valuable portion of his library to Harvard.

== Sources ==
- Dowling, Linda. Charles Eliot Norton: The Art of Reform in Nineteenth-Century America. (University of New Hampshire Press, 2007) 245pp ISBN 978-1-58465-646-3.
- Sullivan, Mark W. "Charles Eliot Norton", in Tiffany K. Wayne, ed., Ralph Waldo Emerson: A Critical Companion (Facts on File, 2010).
- Turner, James C. The Liberal Education of Charles Eliot Norton. (Johns Hopkins University Press, 1999)
- Verduin, Kathleen, "The Medievalism of Charles Eliot Norton," in: Cahier Calin: Makers of the Middle Ages. Essays in Honor of William Calin , ed. Richard Utz and Elizabeth Emery (Kalamazoo, MI: Studies in Medievalism, 2011), pp. 59–61.
