= American Volunteer Motor Ambulance Corps =

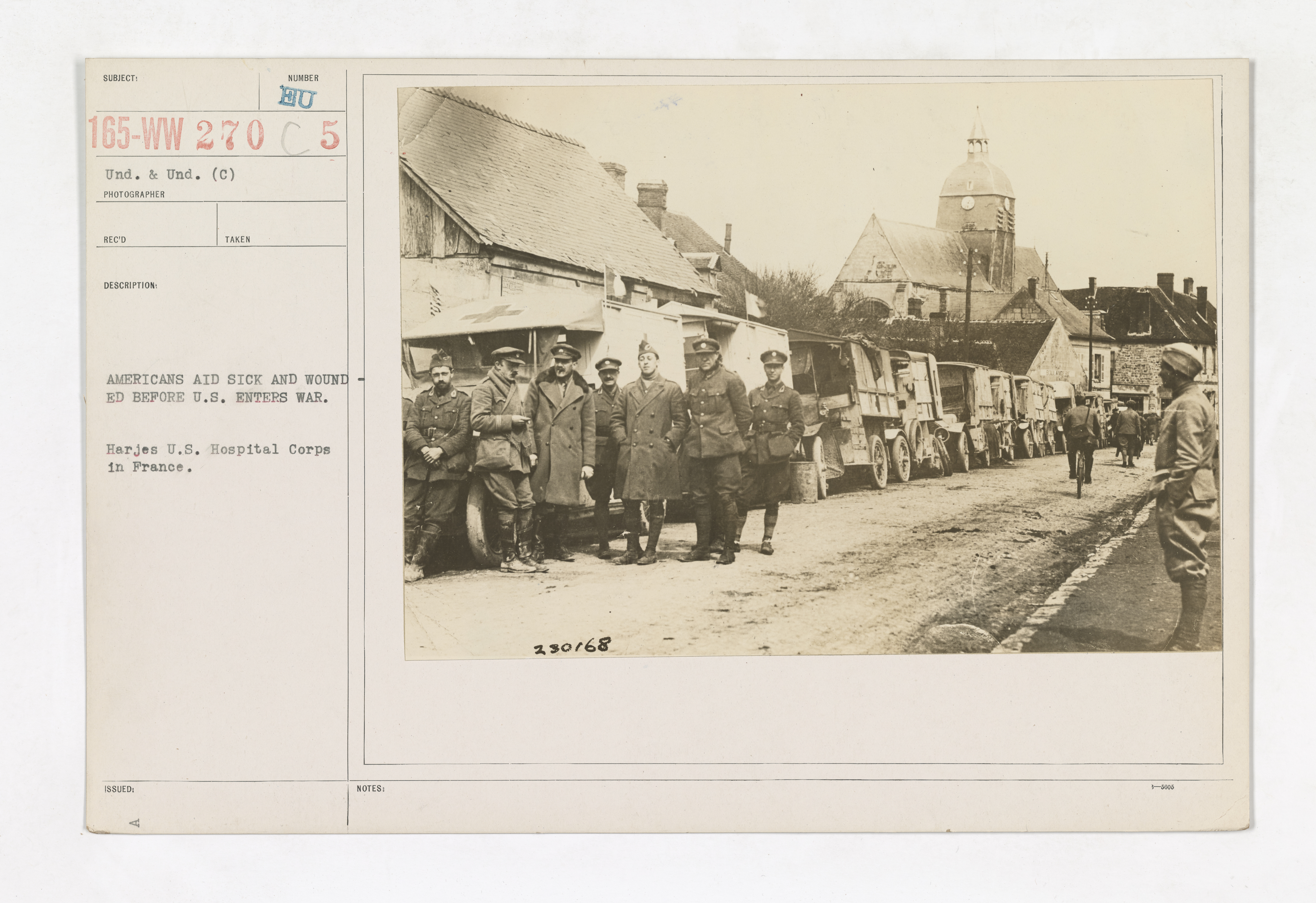
U.S. Hospital Corps in France

The American Volunteer Motor Ambulance Corps, also known as the Norton-Harjes Ambulance Corps, was an organization started in London, England, in the fall of 1914 by Richard Norton, a noted archeologist and son of Harvard professor Charles Eliot Norton.

== History ==
Its mission was to assist the movement of wounded Allied troops from the battlefields to hospitals in France during World War I. The Corps began with two cars and four drivers. The service was associated with the British Red Cross and St. John Ambulance.

(Henry James) enlisted himself in the same way in the service of the particular American activity that arose in England during the early days of the war, before America's entry which he did not live to see. He accepted the chairmanship of the American Volunteer Motor Ambulance Corps in France. Richard Norton, the son of his old friend Charles Eliot Norton and a friend of Mrs. Wharton, had thrown himself into this work and James and Mrs. Wharton were committed to helping. James wrote a long letter to the American press on the nature of this endeavor. It was designed to be informative, as an appeal for funds. The Corps was one of the pioneer enterprises in the age of the motor.

The "Harjes" part of the name refers to Henry Herman Harjes, a French-born American millionaire banker who wished to help Norton by donating funds and ambulances. When John Dos Passos joined the corps in 1917, the service had 13 sections of 600 American volunteer drivers and 300 ambulances. Poet Robert W. Service also joined the Ambulance Corps in 1915 in the Somme and wrote a new book of war poetry, Rhymes of a Red Cross Man, in 1916.

American poet E. E. Cummings joined the Norton-Harjes Ambulance Corps in 1917 before the U.S. entered the war. During this time he was briefly imprisoned on false grounds. His 1922 autobiography The Enormous Room documented his experiences of the war.
