= Peter Grant (footballer, born 1879) =

Scottish footballer

Personal information
- Full name: Peter Gunn Grant
- Date of birth: 3 June 1879
- Place of birth: Gorbals, Scotland
- Date of death: 10 December 1937 (aged 58)
- Place of death: Castlecary, Scotland
- Position: Full back

Senior career*
Years	Team	Apps	(Gls)
–1897	Glasgow Perthshire		
1897–1900	Motherwell	40	(3)
1900–1902	Hamilton Academical	12	(0)
1902–1908	Queen's Park	2	(0)
- * Club domestic league appearances and goals

Peter Gunn Grant (3 June 1879 – 10 December 1937) was a Scottish amateur footballer who played in the Scottish League for Motherwell, Hamilton Academical and Queen's Park as a full back.

== Personal life ==
In 1917, three years since the outbreak of the First World War, Grant joined the French Army's Special Ambulance Service as a driver/mechanic. He was twice awarded the Croix de Guerre for "outstanding acts of bravery". Grant died in the Castlecary rail accident on 10 December 1937.

== Career statistics ==
Appearances and goals by club, season and competition
Club	Season	League			Scottish Cup		Other		Total	
Club	Season	Division	Apps	Goals	Apps	Goals	Apps	Goals	Apps	Goals
Motherwell	1897–98	Scottish Second Division	9	2	0	0	—		9	2
Motherwell	1898–99	Scottish Second Division	14	0	0	0	—		14	0
Motherwell	1899–1900	Scottish Second Division	17	1	8	0	—		25	1
Motherwell	Total		40	3	8	0	—		48	3
Hamilton Academical	1900–01	Scottish Second Division	11	0	0	0	5 (Note: Appearances in Lanarkshire Cup)	0	16	0
Hamilton Academical	1901–02	Scottish Second Division	1	0	0	0	0	0	1	0
Hamilton Academical	Total		12	0	0	0	5	0	17	0
Queen's Park	1902–03	Scottish First Division	2	0	0	0	—		2	0
Career total			54	3	8	0	5	0	67	3
