= Richard Norton (archaeologist) =

American academic

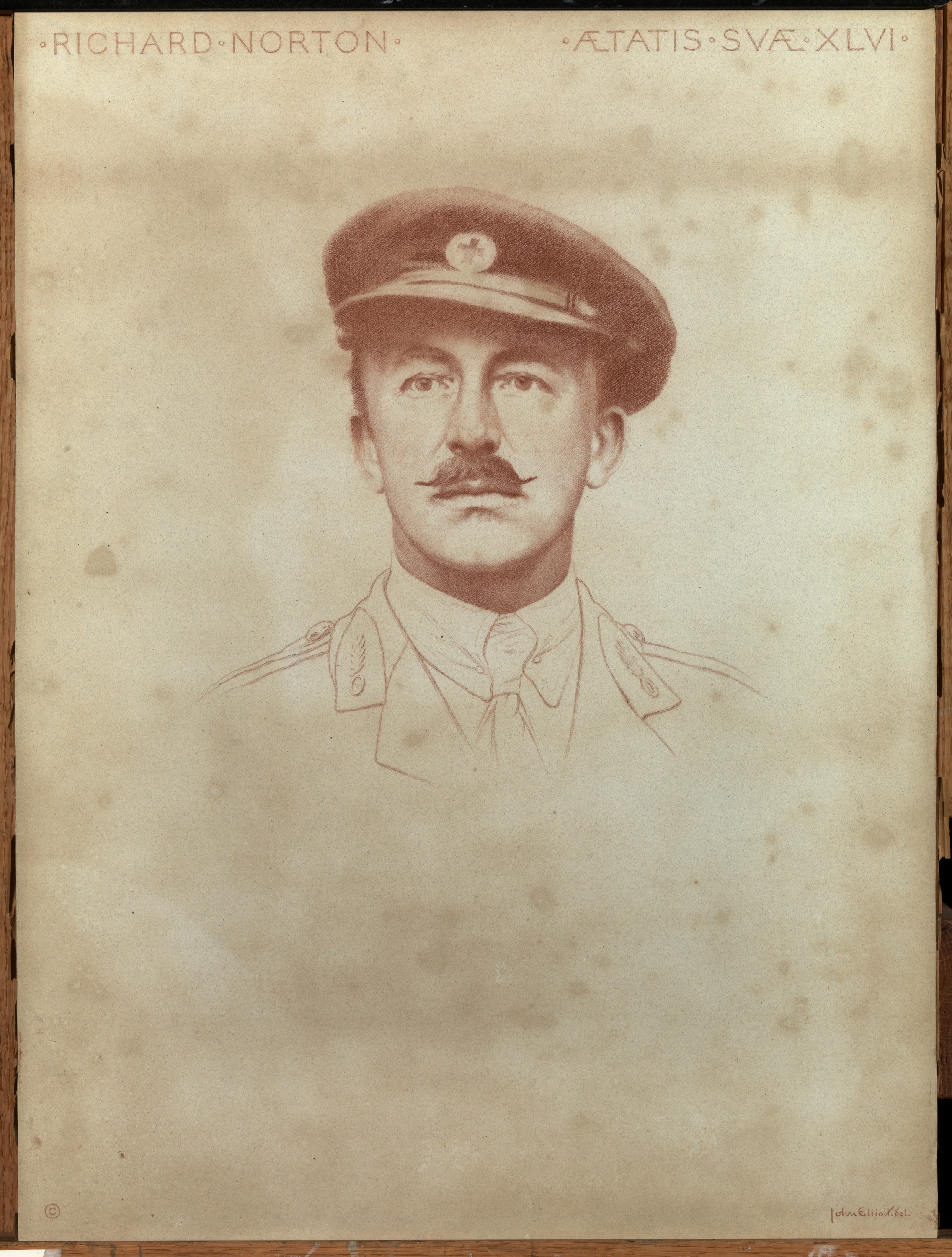
- Born: Richard Norton; February 9, 1872; Dresden, Germany
- Died: August 2, 1918 (aged 46); Paris, France
- Citizenship: American
- Occupations: Instructor, Professor, Director
- Years active: 1894-1917
- Known for: American Volunteer Motor Ambulance Corps
- Board member of: Boston Museum of Fine Art, Archaeological Institute of America
- Spouse: Edith White (m. 1896; div. 1910)
- Children: 1
- Parent: Charles Eliot Norton
- Awards: Croix de Guerre, Legion of Honour

Academic background
- Education: Harvard University
- Academic advisor: Wilhelm Dörpfeld

Academic work
- Discipline: History of Fine Art
- Sub-discipline: Classical antiquity
- Institutions: American School of Classical Studies at Athens; Bryn Mawr College; American School of Classical Studies in Rome

Richard Norton (February 9, 1872 – August 2, 1918) was an American fine art historian and archaeologist, specializing in classical antiquity, who was head of the American School of Classical Studies in Rome, and a director for the Boston Museum of Fine Art, and the Archaeological Institute of America before World War I. From October 1914 he was the organizer and head of the American Volunteer Motor Ambulance Corps, until its absorption by the American Army in September 1917. For his efforts he was awarded the Croix de Guerre (June 1915) and the Grand-Croix of the Legion of Honour (April 1917) by the French government.

== Early life ==
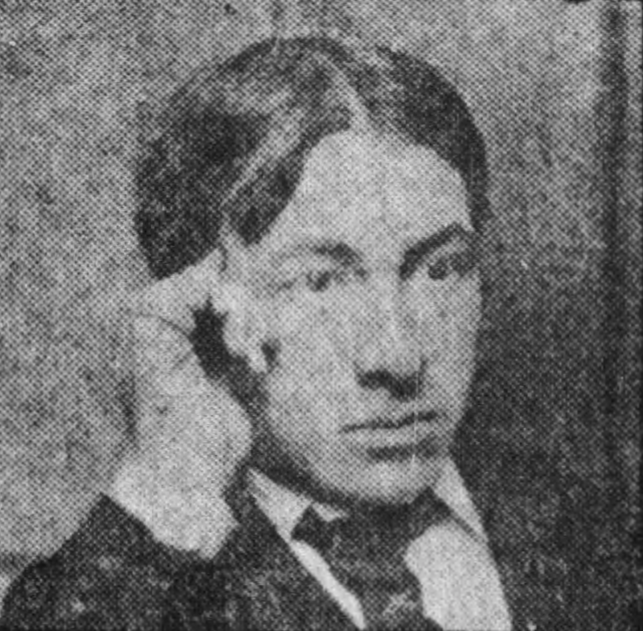

Norton was born February 9, 1872 in Dresden, Germany where his American parents were visiting at the time. He was the sixth and last child of Charles Eliot Norton and his wife Susan Sedgwick, who died 8 days after Norton's birth. When his family returned to Cambridge, Massachusetts, where his father was professor of the History of Art at Harvard University, Norton attended the small private Browne and Nichols School in Cambridge. Norton was the only one of his siblings to follow his father's field of study. His father's fame may have helped open doors, but it also led to being overshadowed. Even after his father's death, newspaper articles reporting on Richard Norton's achievements would carry headlines with "Son of Charles Eliot Norton" rather than his own name.

After graduating from Browne and Nichols School he went abroad for a year of travel, before entering Harvard University. While at Harvard he made his first known public appeal by placing an ad in the local newspaper for a lost St. Bernard. He earned a Bachelor of Arts degree from Harvard in June 1892.

== Academic career ==
After Harvard, Norton studied in Germany with Wilhelm Dörpfeld. Norton was elected an instructor at the American School of Classical Studies at Athens in June 1894. He returned to America in 1896 to get married and accept a position at Bryn Mawr College, where he was the first professor of Art and Archaeology. He left Bryn Mawr to become a professor of archaeology at the American School of Classical Studies in Rome in 1897. He was elected its director for a five-year term in 1899, and was re-elected in 1904. However, he resigned the post early after separating from his wife. He returned to Cambridge, eventually being selected as a director of the Boston Museum of Fine Art. He became a director of the Archaeological Institute of America in 1909.

== Archaeological expeditions ==
Norton had attempted to visit and survey Cyrenaica in 1903-1904, but encountered resistance both from officials of the Ottoman Empire and local inhabitants. He visited Egypt in 1907, exploring the region around Assouan, and securing (Note: In that era the casual acquisition of other people's heritage was a commonplace activity among archaeologists and laymen.) three mummies which he sent to his brother Dr. Rupert Norton at Johns Hopkins Hospital. During 1908 Norton and Prof. D. G. Hogarth of the British Museum conducted an archaeological survey in what is now Syria and south-central Turkey.

After the Young Turk Revolution Norton found the way to Cyrenaica now open. Using a steam-powered yacht (Note: There were then no ports or fixed settlements near the site, which lay ten miles inland from the coast.) belonging to Allison V. Armour, he led the first archaeological survey of the site of Cyrene in 1909, followed by excavations during 1910-1911. On one of these Cyrene digs in March 1911, local tribesmen killed his colleague Dr. Herbert Fletcher De Cou. (Note: The surname was rendered as "De Cow" and "Decone" in some newspaper articles. A graduate of the University of Michigan, De Cou had also studied at the American School of Classical Studies at Athens and taught at the American School of Classical Studies in Rome.) Norton's Cyrene expeditions ended with the outbreak of the Italo-Turkish War.

== Ambulance Corps ==
Norton was in Boston when the Great War broke out. He went to London and then Paris to see how he could be of service. At the American Hospital in Neuilly he saw hundreds of wounded soldiers who had been left for days on the battlefields. He realized at once the means of transporting wounded soldiers from field dressing stations to hospitals was inadequate and overwhelmed. Norton organized a volunteer unit of ten motor ambulances in London, paying for it out of his own funds, and staffed mainly by American volunteers. With the approval of the London War Office, the unit went to France in October 1914 with the British Red Cross, where in the first week they moved over 500 wounded. Norton enlisted the aid of his sister Elizabeth Gaskell Norton (Note: The only one of his five siblings to possess and use a middle name. Richard Norton does not appear to have had one either.) in Boston to collect donations. Friends of Norton wrote letters to US newspapers urging readers to donate money, as did the author Henry James.

At first stationed at Amiens, the Corps was attached to the Second French Army and moved to Doullens in November 1914. By January 1915 the Corps had transported almost 40,000 wounded. Norton explained that the Corps' work fell into two divisions: picking up wounded from field dressing stations for transport to field hospitals, and moving patients from field hospitals to railway stations for evacuation by train. In March 1915 the British Army decided to take over the Corps for its own use, but was dissuaded by Norton and protests from the French Second Army, which by then had based its entire field hospital setup on the Corps' presence. It was instead decided to expand the Corps so it could serve both armies.

By June 1915 the Corps had expanded to 25 ambulances, and was now based at Baizieux. That month, the French government awarded Norton the Croix de Guerre, citing "marvelous coolness and courage" in transporting wounded while under fire. By late spring 1917 the Corps had grown to 12 sections, each composed of 20 ambulances and forty stretcher bearers. In April 1917 the French Government awarded Norton the Grand-Croix of the Legion of Honour. His award of the Cross of the Legion of Honor was the highest award (Note: Lt. William Thaw, of the Lafayette Escadrille, was the first American awarded the Legion of Honor in June 1916, but his award was for the rank of Chevalier.) given to any foreigner by France during World War I.

The American entry into the war led to the U.S. Army taking over the American Volunteer Motor Ambulance Corps in September 1917. The Corps was militarized, with volunteers under the age of forty being required to enlist or accept a discharge, while those over forty were automatically discharged. Norton and his staff were offered commissions, but chose to resign instead.

== Last year and death ==
After Norton retired from heading the Ambulance Corps, he remained in France to help with the transition. His death from meningitis after a one day illness occurred on August 2, 1918. His body was temporarily interred in Paris then in February 1919 was brought back to America with returning doughboys on board the USS Henderson.

== Personal life ==
Norton married Edith White, the daughter of a Harvard professor, on June 16, 1896 in Cambridge. While living in Rome, they had a daughter Susan in May 1902, but separated in June 1906. White obtained a divorce in 1910 on grounds of desertion.

== Selected publications ==
Excluding newspaper articles and letters.

- Greek Grave-Reliefs, Volume VIII of Harvard Studies in Classical Philology, Ginn & Company, Boston, 1897.
- Catalogue Of The Corbett Collection Of Casts From Greek And Roman Sculpture by Edward Robinson and Richard Norton, The Portland Art Association, Portland, Oregon, 1897
- "From Bengazi To Cyrene" in Bulletin of the Archaeological Institute of America, Volume 2, 1910-1911
- "Etruria" in Encyclopædia Britannica, (11th ed., 1911) (in part)
- "Tripoli, As An American Sees It" in The Century Illustrated Monthly Magazine, Volume 83, January 1912
- Bernini and Other Studies in the History of Art, The MacMillan Company, 1914
