= American Red Cross Motor Corps =

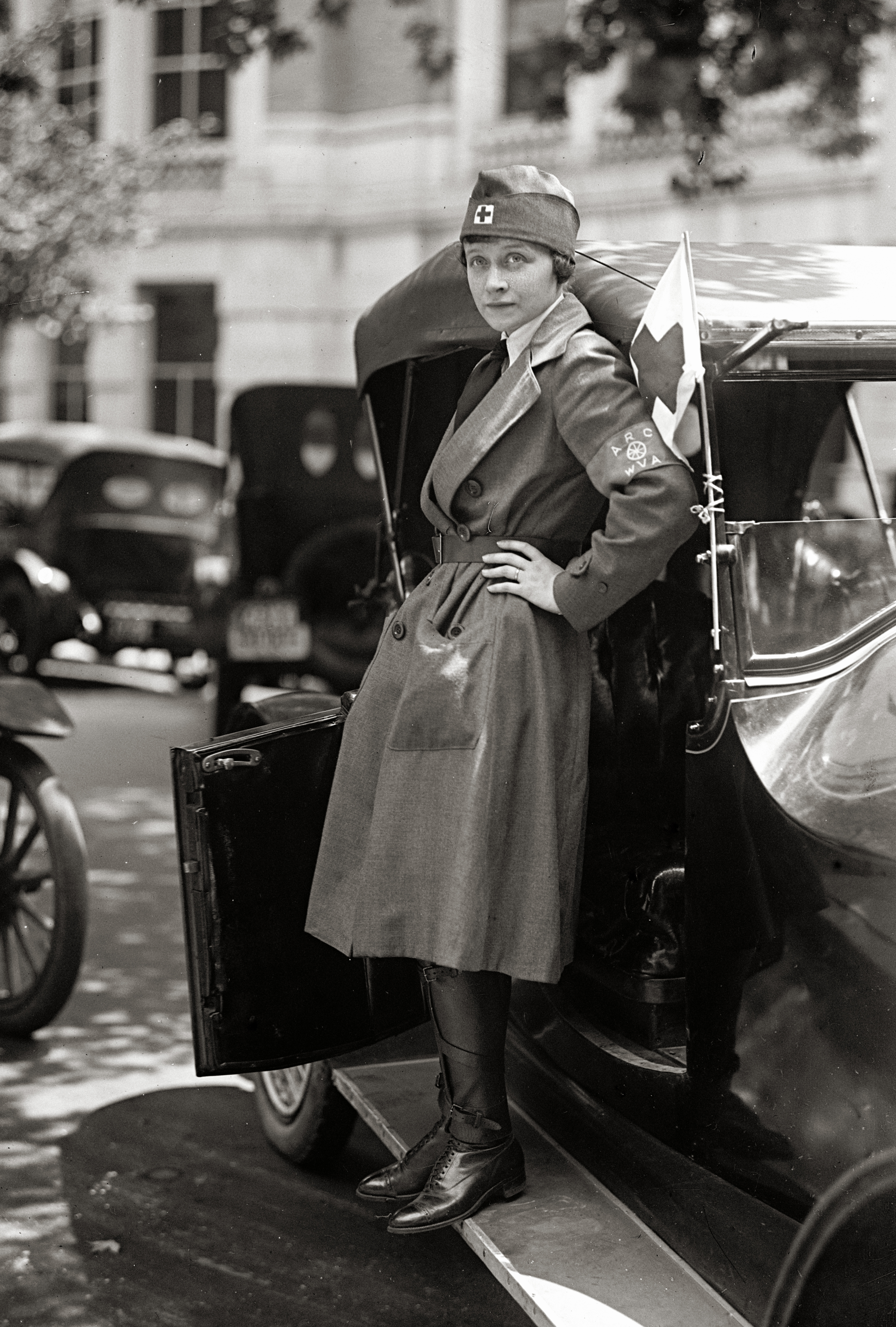
Red Cross Motor Corps (1917)

American Red Cross Motor Corps (also known as American Red Cross Motor Service) was founded in 1917 by the American Red Cross (ARC). The service was composed of women and it was developed to render supplementary aid to the U.S. Army and Navy in transporting troops and supplies during World War I, and to assist other ARC workers in conducting their various relief activities. The diverse character of the work included canteen work, military hospitals, camps and cantonments, home service workers, outside aid, office detail, other ARC activities, and miscellaneous services, such as the 1918 flu pandemic.

== History ==
The organizations which became parts of the Red Cross Motor Corps Service were the Motor Messenger Service of Philadelphia; the National Service League Motor Corps, of Atlanta; the National Service League Motor Corps, of New York City and Buffalo; the Emergency Motor Corps, of New Orleans, and the Emergency Drivers, of Chicago. All these organizations were represented at a national conference by their commanding officers, who then become commanders of the Red Cross Motor Corps Service in their respective cities. The four independent services added more than six hundred members to the Motor Corps ranks.

In conformity with the request of the US War Department, the uniform of khaki and the insignia formerly employed have been discarded. The new regulation uniform of the Motor Corps became Red Cross Oxford grey. The cars of the service are to be distinguished by a white metal pennant, bearing the red cross and the words "Motor Corps" This and the driver's identification card were considered sufficient to give the cars the right of way when on official business. It has been decided that women of the ARC Motor Corps Service would carry the official telegrams containing information regarding over-seas casualties to the homes of relatives killed and wounded.

=== World War I ===
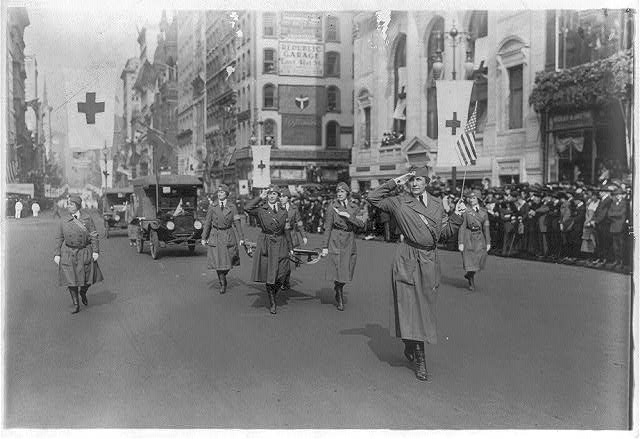
Florence Harriman heading Washington Ambulance Corps in Red Cross parade

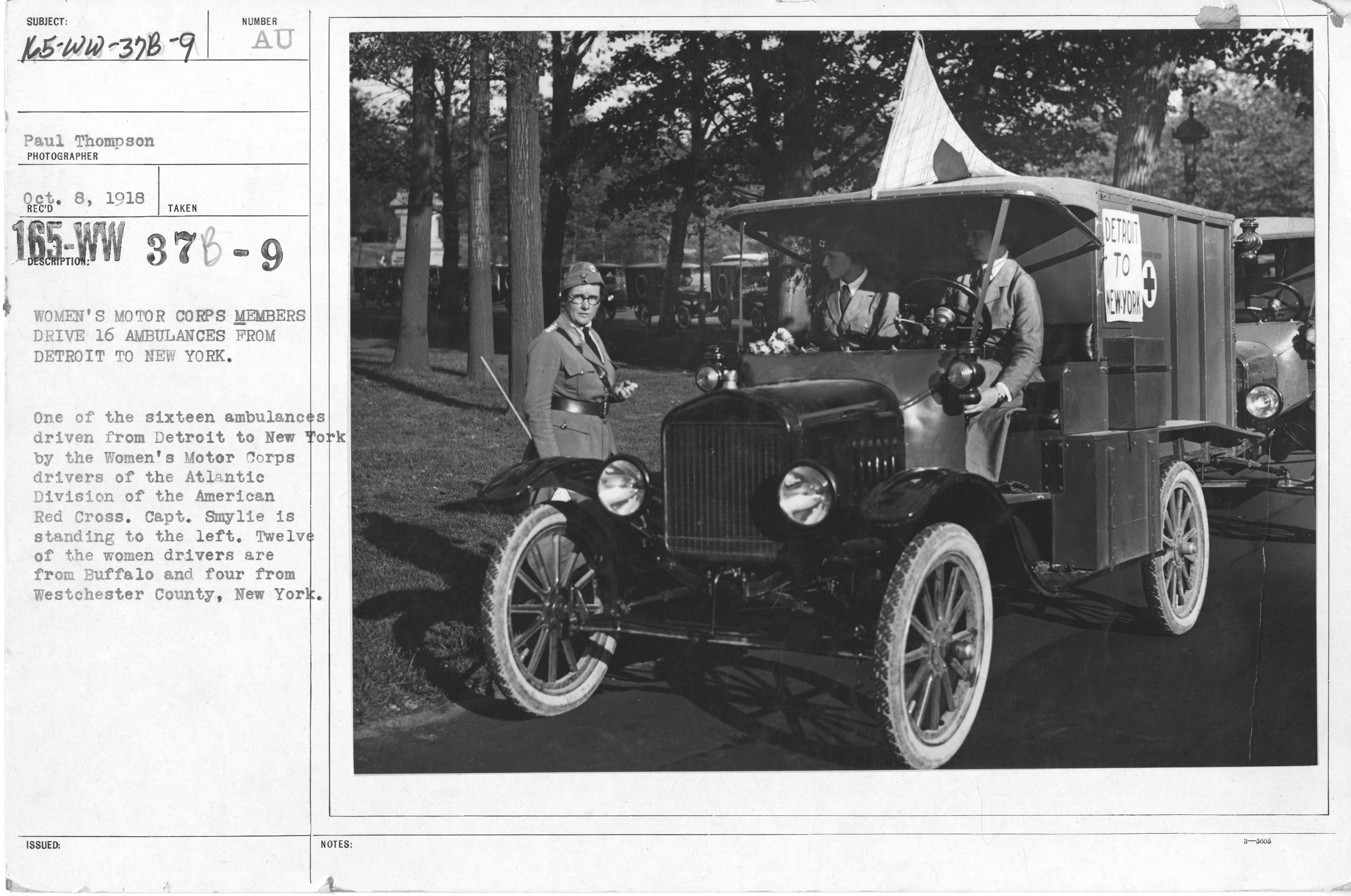
October 1918: Detroit to New York by the Women's Motor Corps drivers of the Atlantic Division of the American Red Cross. (Capt. Smylie on the left side.)

The Motor Corps was established in February 1917 to support the transport of sick and wounded soldiers from troop trains to hospitals during WWI. The Motor Corps also assisted with the delivery of supplies to and from storage warehouses, along with transporting nurses and canteen workers to their posts.

Volunteers of the Motor Corps often served as auxiliaries to the Army and Navy. The organization of the service fell under the charge of the Bureau within the Department of Military Relief, and strict adherence to military discipline and a requisite level of military training were consistently enforced.

The service was organized as a Bureau of the Department of Military Relief, and in every Chapter which organized a Motor Corps, a Captain was appointed to command the Corps, with power to appoint Lieutenants and noncommissioned officers. Military discipline and an appropriate measure of military training were strictly enforced.

The First Division consisted of the ambulance drivers and truck drivers, who were required to meet the highest standard, and to perform the most exacting and the heaviest service, of the Corps. The First Division women had to pass searching examinations in motor mechanics, first aid, sanitary troop and stretcher drill, and road driving. A certificate was given to every woman who qualified for the First Division.

By June 30, 1918, there were already in operation throughout the US approximately 100 Motor Corps with a membership of about 3,000 women. During the summer of 1918, the development of the Motor Corps was rapid and systematic. On November 1, 1918, there were over 12,000 motor corps workers, most of whom were donating not only their time, but also the use of their cars. Many new Corps were formed throughout the country, and various motor organizations which had up until then been operating independently came in under the Red Cross, until by December 31, 1918, there were 297 Motor Corps in the United States with a membership of 11,604, exclusive of the Auxiliaries and the Reserves who had placed their names on the lists for service in times of emergency. In addition to the fact that all the members of the Motor Corps were volunteers, each member supplied her own car and sustained all its operating expenses. The members who gave regular Motor Corps service were expected to be on duty a minimum of 16 hours a week, although they did not limit themselves to that total, the general average being more than twice the required minimum. During the twenty months ending February 28, 1919, a mileage of more than 3,572,000 miles was covered by the automobiles operated by the motor corps with services provided to canteens, military hospitals, camps, cantonments, home service workers, outside aid, office detail, and other ARC activities, as well as during the 1918 flu pandemic. The Red Cross Motor Service was composed of women volunteers who used their personal cars. More than 12,000 women provided their services to this branch of the ARC by the end of World War I, logging over 3,500,000 miles (5,600,000 km).

Except for incidental service which was rendered in connection with entertainment and recreation under Red Cross auspices at the remaining military hospitals, and for the active Home Service and Nursing Service work in the civilian field, in time of disaster or epidemic, by December 1920, the Motor Corps was mostly demobilized, retaining primarily a reserve organization to meet peacetime emergencies of civilian as well as military character.

==== Ambulance Service ====
As the war drew on toward its close, the Ambulance Service of the Motor Corps in the US became increasingly important and useful, and after the Armistice, during the winter of 1918 and spring of 1919, there were several hundred Red Cross ambulances in use in various parts of the country, supplementing the work of the Army and Navy in transporting sick and wounded men from ships and trains to their destinations. and aiding hospitals and local relief organizations. On December 31, 1918, the reports of the Motor Corps from the Divisions disclosed for the last year of the war that the Motor Corps gave an average minimum service amounting to 6,864,000 service hours, which, figured in their value in dollars, representing a tremendous donation to the Red Cross war fund. Approximately 34,— 320,000 service miles were operated during the year. The value of the motor equipment alone, put at the service of the Red Cross free of charge, represented an investment of over $17,000,000, exclusive of upkeep and operating maintenance. In the late winter and early spring of 1919, an additional need for Motor Service developed in connection with the entertainments and recreations under the auspices of the Red Cross at the various hospitals. The demand was particularly heavy during the spring and summer months, for many of the parties and entertainments then given were out of doors and sometimes at a considerable distance from the hospital.

=== 1918 flu pandemic ===
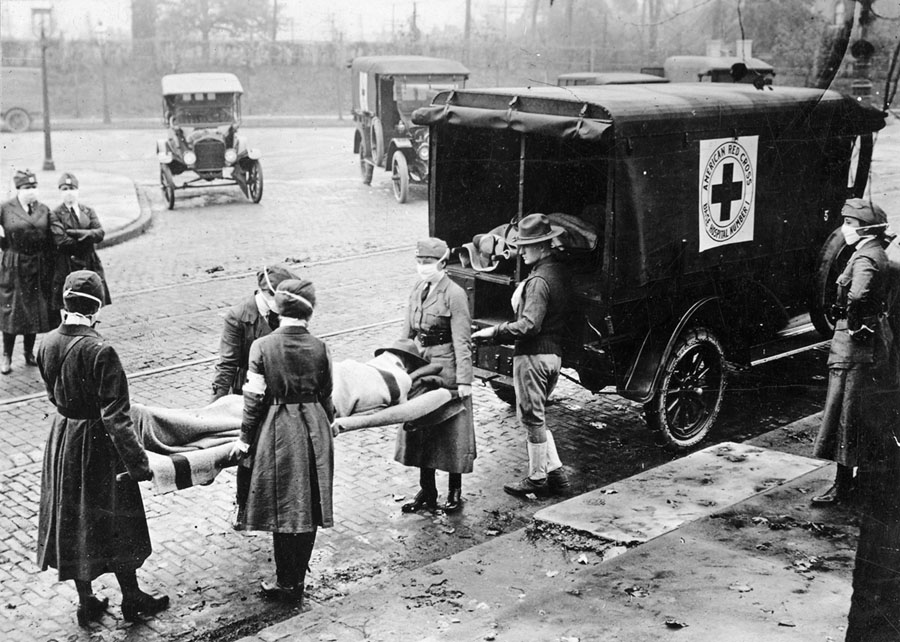
Flu pandemic (St, Louis, Missouri; 1918)

During the influenza epidemic which spread over the country in the autumn of 1918, the Red Cross Motor Service met and passed its severest test in a distinguished way. There are on file at ARC National Headquarters hundreds of newspaper clippings and testimonial letters of appreciation from military, naval and medical men and authorities, and from public institutions and private individuals, testifying to the valiant work of the Corps in the influenza crisis. Fearless of the possibility of contracting influenza themselves, the Motor Corps women worked night and day, frequently serving as much as 100 hours per week apiece, carrying patients—on their backs, in sheets, in blankets, on chairs, or whatever was available when stretchers could not be used— to hospitals from homes of poverty and luxury alike. No assignment was refused, nor did members of the Motor Corps confine themselves to these services-—they did anything that needed doing. It is on record that they actually scrubbed floors and cooked meals for families, all members of which were ill, and in several instances they even conducted funerals.

=== Perth Amboy disaster ===
In the 1918 T. A. Gillespie Company Shell Loading Plant explosion, when the Gillespie Munitions Loading Plant was destroyed, the Corps rendered invaluable service in transporting doctors, nurses and relief workers to the scene of the explosion, and in picking up hundreds of refugees and finding shelter, food, clothing and medical attention for them.

=== World War II ===
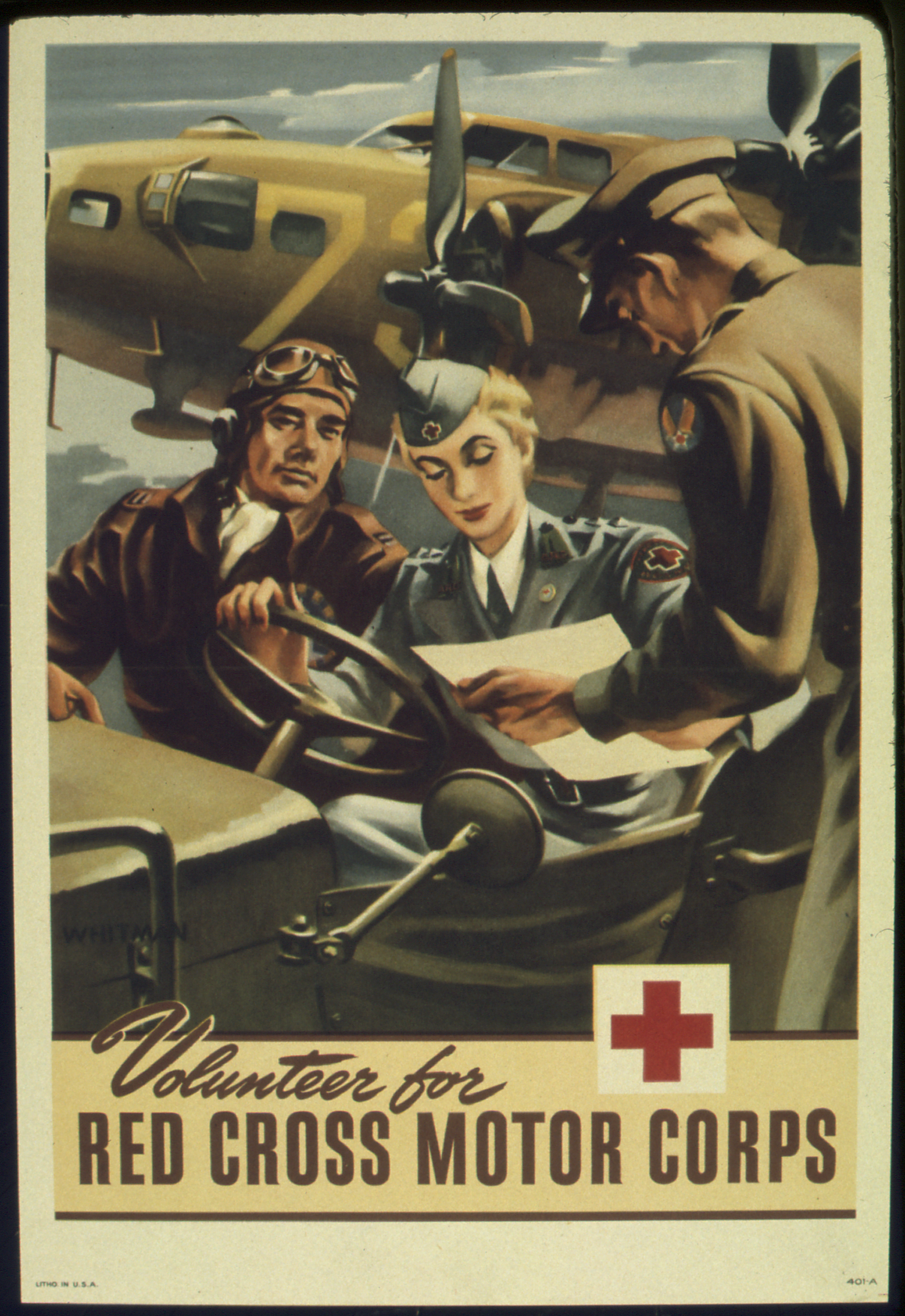
World War II volunteer poster

During World War II, 45,000 women logged more than 61,000,000 miles (98,000,000 km) with deliveries and providing transportation. Many of the corp members took classes in auto maintenance to keep their cars running and used their own transportation to deliver supplies, and transport not only the sick and wounded, but also volunteers to and from facilities. The mechanics classes included information on everything from jumping the ignition to changing tires and also included 20 hours of emergency medical training. Several large cities, like New York City and Chicago had African American units of the Motor Corps.

In Hawaii, volunteers attended first aid courses at Queen's Hospital and studied to become members of the Red Cross Women's Volunteer Motor Corps. Their studies were difficult. They learned to drive and maintain heavy army trucks, trailer rigs, and ambulances; change massive tires and fix engines; and “first aid, emergency delivery of babies, blackout driving, military drills, and defense against gas attacks.” On July 20, 1941, Ginger Lilly, along with her other Red Cross Motor Corps drivers, “began regular duties” and were “given a complete list of assignments for ‘Attack Day.’” On December 7, 1941, Ginger reported for duty in her gray gabardine Red Cross uniform, tin helmet and gas mask. For three days from Pearl Harbor, she transported the wounded, “...many of whom were in great pain and shock and terribly worried about their wives and children,” to makeshift first aid stations set up in all the local schools, such as Farrington and Ma‘ema‘e Elementary in Nu‘uanu Valley. “They pressed upon me scraps of paper telling their names and which hospital they’d be in and begged me to find their wives and children. I said I would.”

== Bibliography ==
- American National Red Cross. War Council (1919). The Work of the American Red Cross During the War: A Statement of Finances and Accomplishments for the Period July 1, 1917, to February 28, 1919 (Public domain ed.). American Red cross.
- Bureau of Publications for the Department of Chapters (1920). The Red Cross Bulletin. Vol. 6 (Public domain ed.). American Red Cross.
- Cott, Nancy F. (1993). Women and War. Munich, Germany: Walter de Gruyter. ISBN 978-3-11-097112-5.
- Mullenbach, Cheryl (2013). Double Victory: How African American Women Broke Race and Gender Barriers to Help Win World War II. Chicago, Illinois: Chicago Review Press. ISBN 978-1-56976-808-2.
- Schwarzkopf, E.E. (1918). Automobile Topics. Vol. 50 (Public domain ed.). E.E. Schwarzkopf.
