= American Ambulance =

Volunteer medical aide organization during World War I

American Ambulance (fr:Ambulance Américaine) were volunteer medics. In 1915, before the United States' formal entry into World War I, teams of surgeons and their support staff had already been deployed to France. The surgeons' service at the Ambulance Américaine in Paris and at other smaller hospital facilities in the French countryside, often close to the front lines brought about the efficient integration of civilian American medicine into World War I's military structure. Under the leadership of George Washington Crile and Harvey Cushing, this early American surgical presence in France during the war pioneered the organizational structure and procedural advances of modern military medicine.
