= Allentown, Pennsylvania =

City in Pennsylvania, United States

- City
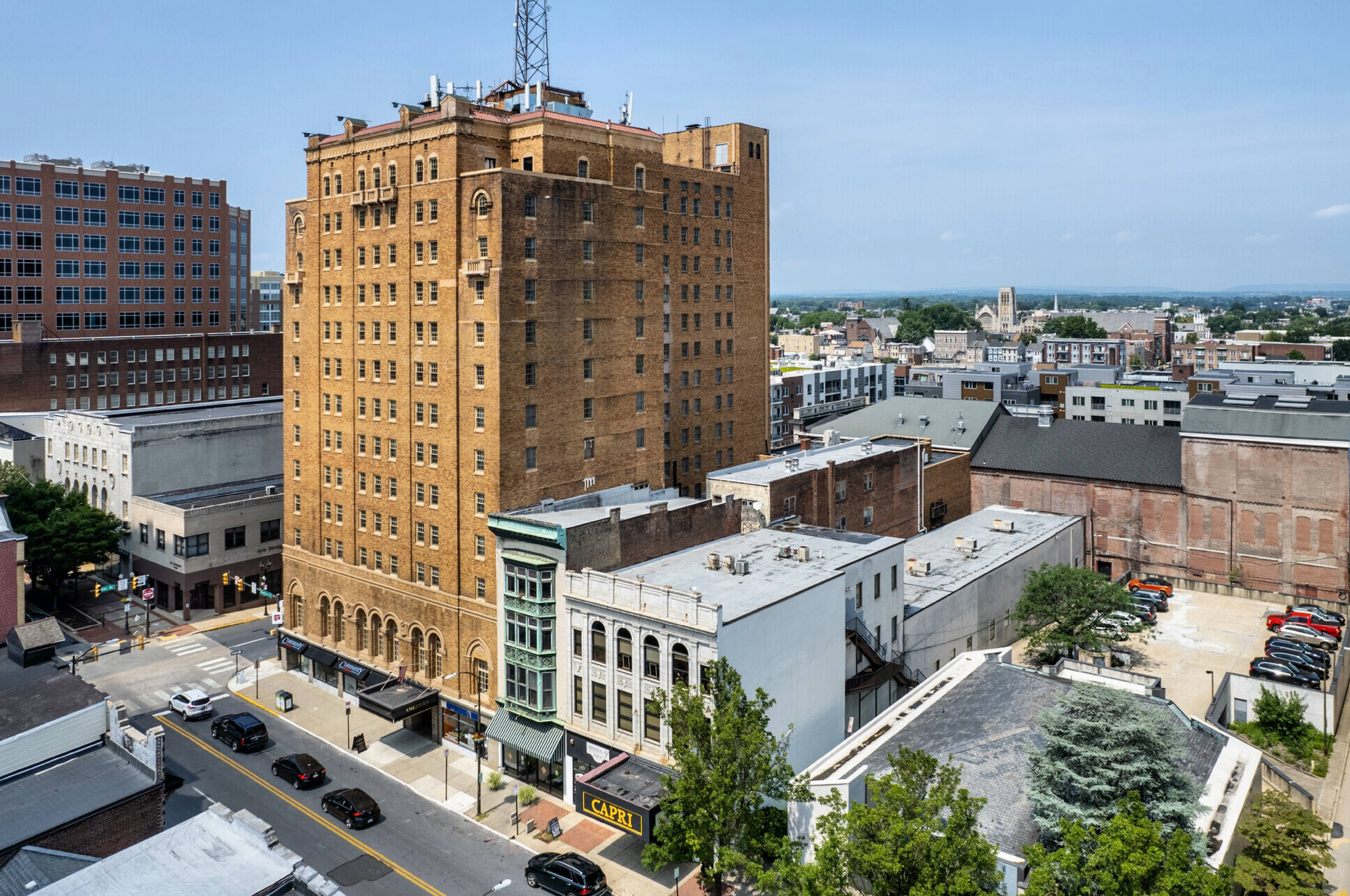
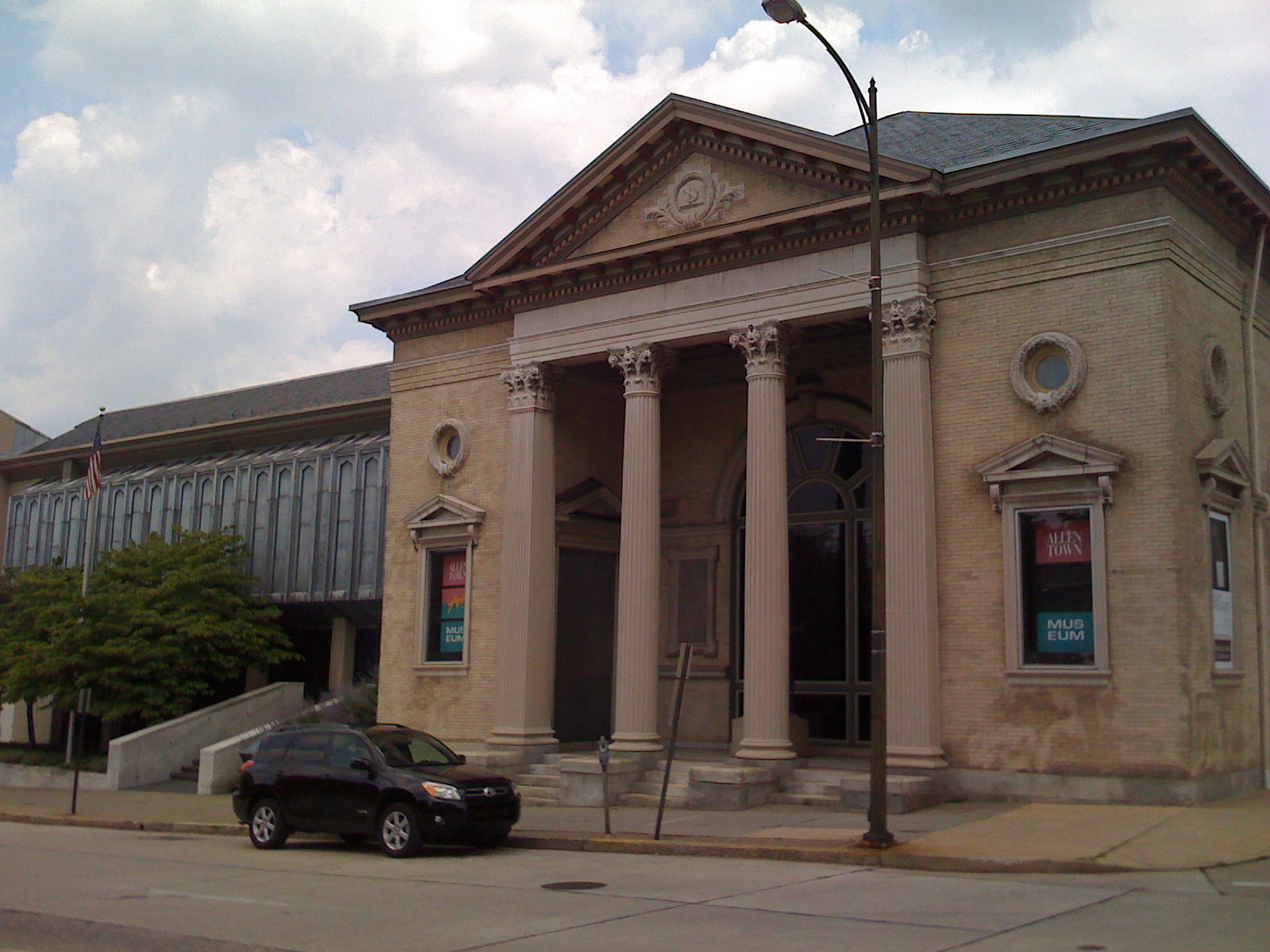
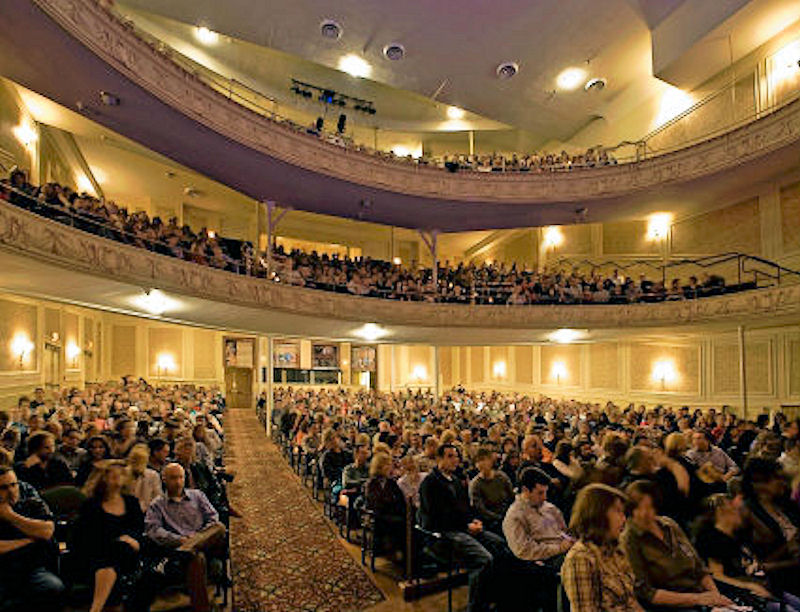
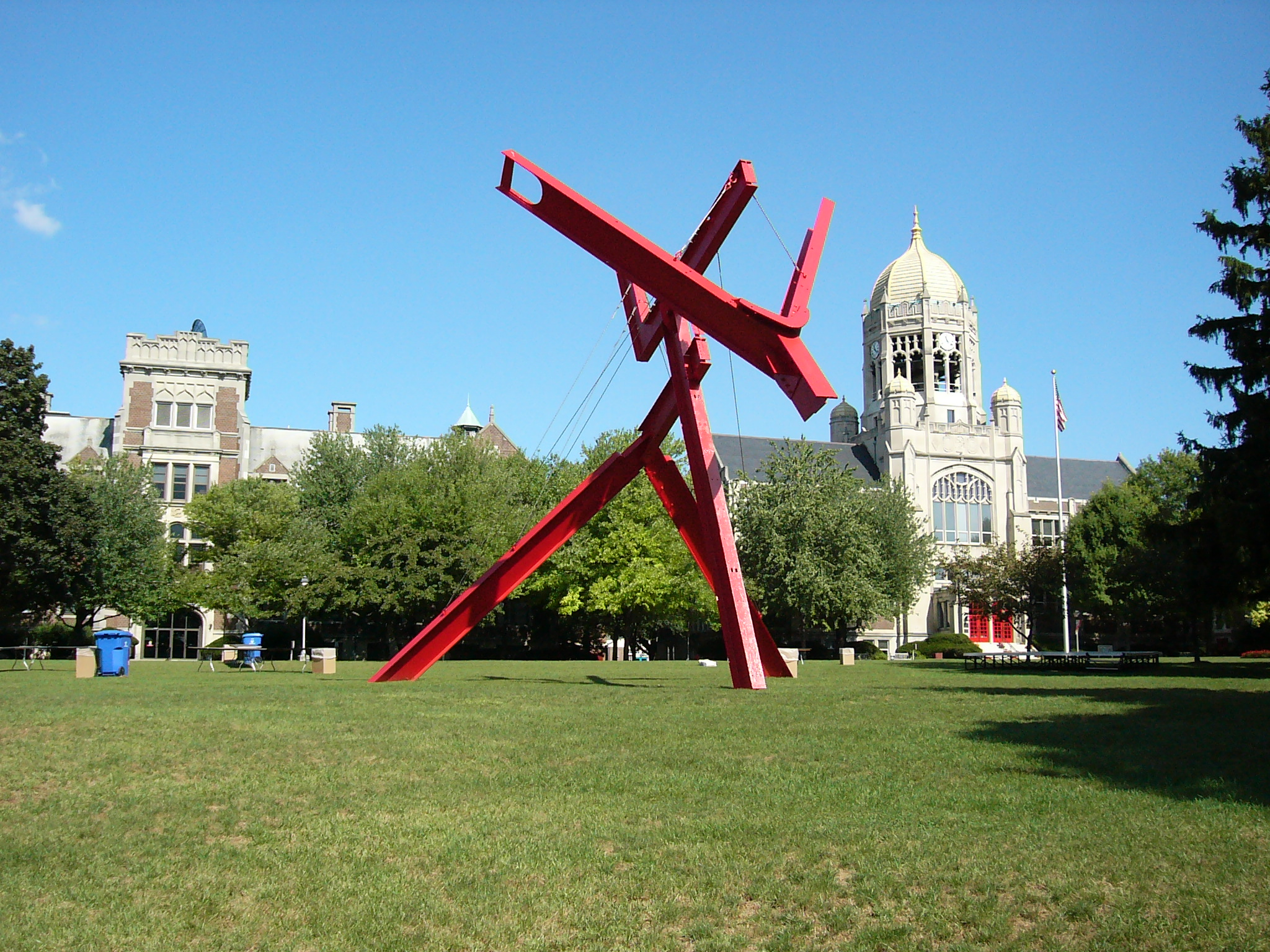
- Center City Allentown Americus Hotel on Hamilton Street Allentown Art Museum Miller Symphony Hall Muhlenberg College

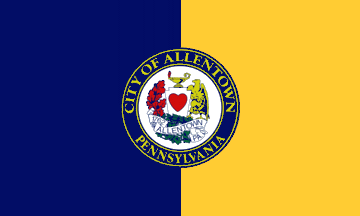
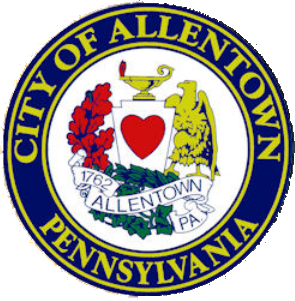
- Flag Seal Word mark
- Nicknames: "The A" "The Queen City", "A-Town", "Band City USA", "Peanut City", "Silk City".
- Motto: Sic Semper Tyrannis
- Interactive map of Allentown, Pennsylvania
- Location within Pennsylvania Location within the United States Location within North America
- Coordinates: 40°36′06″N 75°28′38″W
- Country: United States
- State: Pennsylvania
- County: Lehigh
- Settled: 1751
- Founded: 1762
- Incorporated: March 12, 1867
- Founder: William Allen
- Named for: William Allen

Government
  - Type: Mayor-council
  - Mayor: Matthew Tuerk (D)
  - City Solicitor: Matt Kloiber
  - City Controller: Jeff Glazier
  - Senate: Jarrett Coleman (R); Nick Miller (D)

Area
  - City: 18.01 sq mi (46.64 km^{2})
  - Land: 17.56 sq mi (45.49 km^{2})
  - Water: 0.44 sq mi (1.15 km^{2})
  - Urban: 261.5 sq mi (677.4 km^{2})
  - Metro: 453.60 sq mi (1,174.82 km^{2})
- Elevation: 338 ft (103 m)
- Highest elevation: 440 ft (130 m)
- Lowest elevation: 255 ft (78 m)

Population (2020)
  - City: 125,845
  - Rank: 1st in the Lehigh Valley; 3rd in Pennsylvania
  - Density: 7,164.8/sq mi (2,766.35/km^{2})
  - Urban: 621,703 (US: 68th)
  - Urban density: 2,377/sq mi (918/km^{2})
  - Metro: 865,310 (US: 68th)
  - Metro density: 1,117.8/sq mi (431.6/km^{2})
  - Demonym: Allentonian
- Time zone: UTC−5 (EST)
  - Summer (DST): UTC−4 (EDT)
- ZIP Codes: 18101, 18102, 18103, 18104, 18105, 18106, 18109, 18175, and 18195
- Area codes: 610, 484, 835
- FIPS code: 42-02000
- GNIS feature ID: 1213700 and 1215372
- Primary airport: Lehigh Valley International Airport- ABE (Major/International)
- Secondary airport: Allentown Queen City Municipal Airport- XLL (Minor)
- School district: Allentown
- Major hospital: Lehigh Valley–Cedar Crest
- Website: www.allentownpa.gov

Allentown is a city in eastern Pennsylvania, United States. The county seat of Lehigh County, it is the third-most populous city in Pennsylvania, with a population of 125,845 as of the 2020 census. It is also the most populous city in the Lehigh Valley metropolitan area, which had a population of 861,899 and was the 68th-most populous metropolitan area in the nation as of 2020.

Founded in 1762, Allentown is located on the Lehigh River, a 109-mile-long (175 km) tributary of the Delaware River. It is the largest of three adjacent cities, including Bethlehem and Easton in Lehigh and Northampton counties, in the Lehigh Valley region. Allentown is located 48 miles (77 km) north of Philadelphia and 78 miles (126 km) west of New York City.

== History ==
=== 18th century ===
In the early 18th century, the area that is present-day Allentown was a wilderness of scrub oak, where the Lenape, an Indigenous tribe, fished for trout and hunted for deer, grouse, and other game.

On May 18, 1732, the land was deeded by Thomas Penn, one of three sons of William Penn, founder of the colonial era Province of Pennsylvania, to Joseph Turner, a Philadelphia-based iron manufacturer and politician. Two years later, on September 10, 1735, a 5,000-acre (20 km^{2}) portion of this land was purchased from Turner's business partner by William Allen, a wealthy shipping merchant who became mayor of Philadelphia the following month.

In 1737, as part of the Walking Purchase, a large area north of Philadelphia, including present-day Allentown, was deeded by 23 chiefs of the Five Civilized Tribes to three sons of William Penn, John, Thomas, and Richard, in exchange for shoes, buckles, hats, shirts, knives, scissors, combs, needles, looking glasses, rum, and pipes.

The land was surveyed in 1736 and again in 1753 as part of an effort to construct a road from Easton to the city's east to Reading to its west. The 1753 survey reported that a log house, owned by Allen and built around 1740, existed near the western banks of Jordan Creek. The house was used primarily as a hunting and fishing lodge by Allen, but he also entertained prominent guests there, including James Hamilton, his brother-in-law, and John Penn, then governor of the Province of Pennsylvania. In 1752, Northampton and Berks counties were formed; Easton was named the county seat of Northampton County, and Reading the county seat of Berks County.

In 1762, the land, including present-day Allentown, was named and laid out by Allen, and the city was founded. A rivalry between the Penns and Allen may have inspired Allen to acquire the land and found the city. The following year, in 1763, Allen and others sought to relocate the county seat from Easton to Allentown, but the Penns' influence prevailed and the county seat remained in Easton.

The city's original organization, whose archives are now housed at the Historical Society of Pennsylvania in Philadelphia, included 42 city blocks and 756 lots, most of which were 60 feet (18 m) in width and 230 feet (70 m) in depth and was initially located between present-day 4th and 10th streets and Union and Liberty streets. The city was initially named Northampton Towne.

Many streets on the original plan were named for Allen's children, including Margaret (now 5th Street), William (now 6th Street), James (now 8th Street), Ann (now 9th Street), and John (now Walnut Street). Allen Street (now 7th Street), the city's main street, was named for Allen himself. Hamilton Street was named for James Hamilton, deputy governor of colonial era Pennsylvania from 1748 to 1754. Gordon Street was named for Patrick Gordon, an earlier deputy governor of colonial Pennsylvania. Chew Street was named for Benjamin Chew, and Turner Street was named for Allen's business partner Joseph Turner.

Allen initially hoped the city would displace Easton as the seat of Northampton County and become a major national center for commerce due to its location along the Lehigh River and its proximity to Philadelphia, which was then the largest and most influential city in British America and the second-most populous city in the entire British Empire after London. In 1767, Allen granted the land to his son James.

==== American Revolutionary War ====
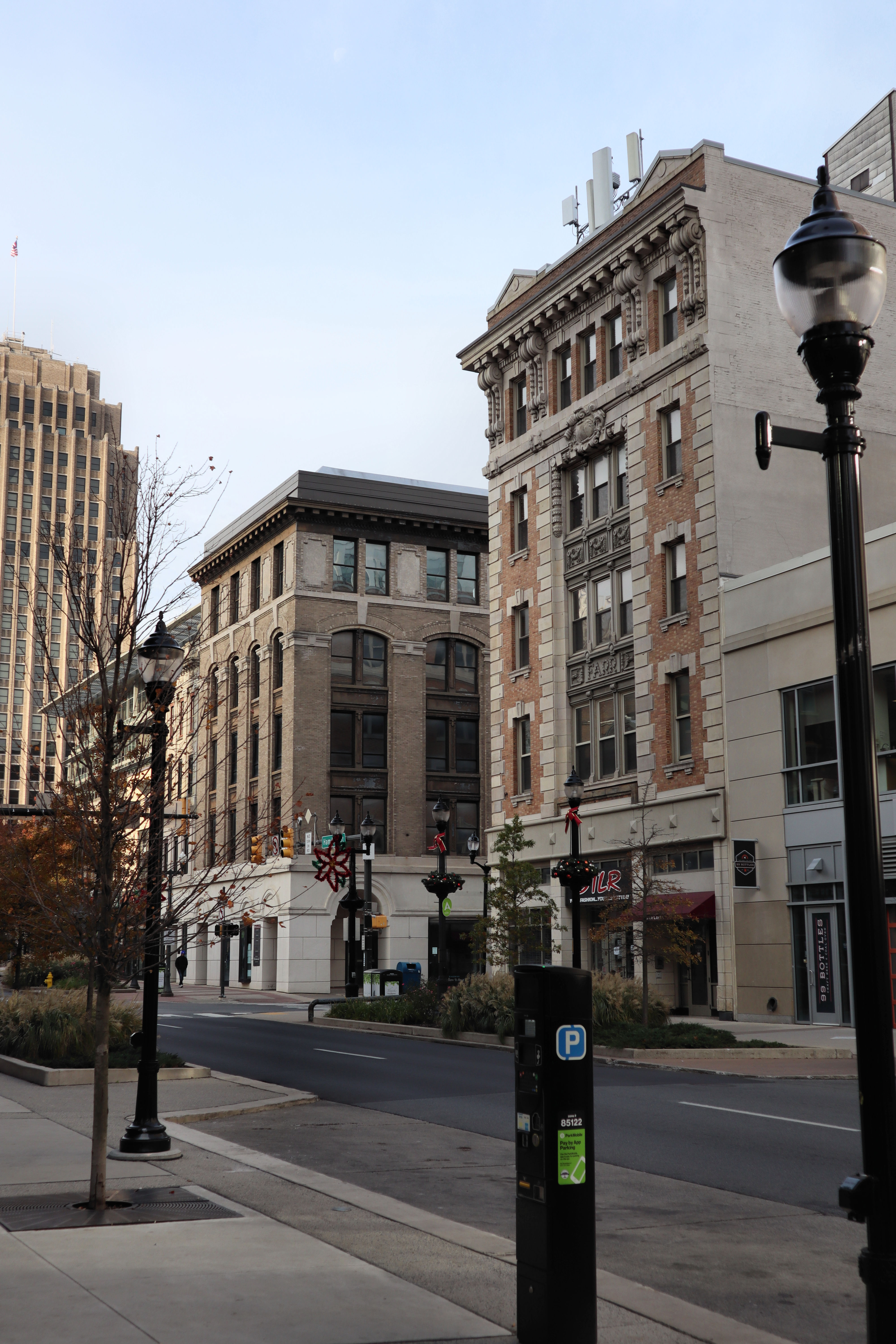
The Farr Building at 739 Hamilton Street, where a hospital treated wounded Continental Army troops during the Revolutionary War

Allentown played a central role in inspiring and supporting the American Revolution and Revolutionary War. Some of the first Patriot resistance to British colonialism in the Thirteen Colonies began in and around present-day Allentown. On December 21, 1774, a Committee of Observation was formed by Allentown-area patriots, who expanded their resistance to British governance, and drove Tories out of the city. The burden of supplying the local militias fell on the people, and requisitions for food, grain, cattle, horses, and cloth were common.

In June 1775, after the Revolutionary War was launched with the Battles of Lexington and Concord, the Second Continental Congress incorporated Patriot militias, including those in present-day Allentown, into the Continental Army and unanimously selected George Washington as its commander. During the Revolutionary War, Hessian prisoners of war were kept in Allentown in the vicinity of present-day 7th and Gordon streets, and the city housed four hospitals for wounded Continental Army troops, including one in Zion Reformed Church and one on the grounds of the present-day Farr Building.

After crossing the Delaware and prevailing in the Battle of Trenton on December 26, 1776, Continental Army commander George Washington and his staff traveled through Allentown, where they proceeded up Water Street, which is present-day Lehigh Street. On the grounds of present-day Wire Mill on Lehigh Street, Washington and his staff stopped at the foot of the street, where they rested and watered their horses, and then proceeded to their post of duty.

In 1777, a manufacturer of paper cartridges and muskets for the Continental Army relocated to Allentown from neighboring Bethlehem, and a shop of 16 armourers was established on Little Lehigh Creek, which was used to repair Continental Army weapons and manufacture saddles and scabbards.

===== Liberty Bell's hiding =====
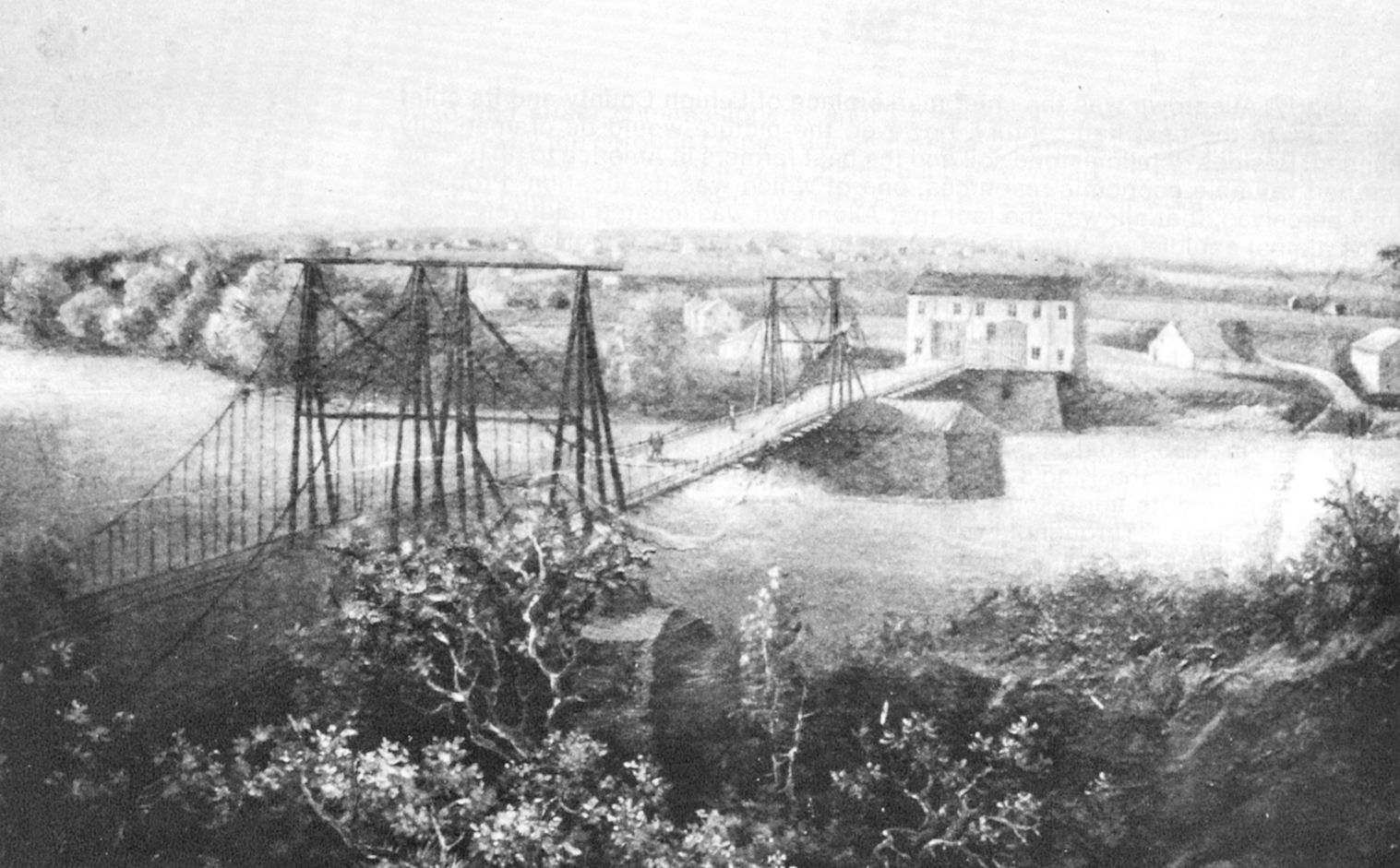
Hamilton Street Bridge, constructed between 1812 and 1814, the first bridge built across the Lehigh River. Three times since, in 1841, 1862, and 1902, it was destroyed by flooding and subsequently rebuilt. In the 1980s, the bridge was extensively refurbished.

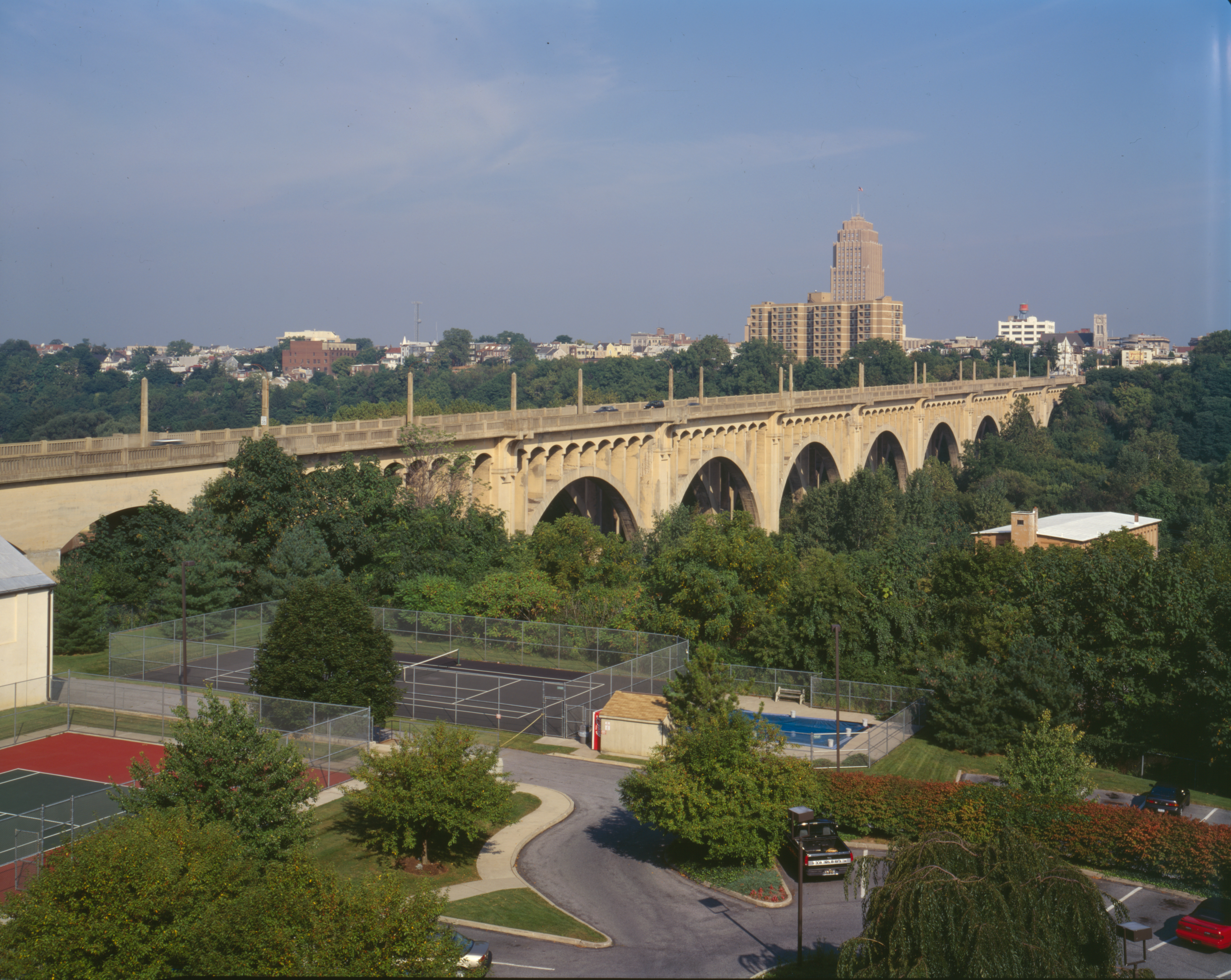
Albertus L. Meyers Bridge, which crosses the Little Lehigh River at 8th Street in Allentown, the longest (2,650 feet; 810 m) and highest (138 feet; 42 m) concrete bridge in the world at the time of its 1913 opening

Allentown holds historical significance as the location where the Liberty Bell, then known as the State House Bell, was successfully hidden from September 1777 to June 1778, during the Revolutionary War by American patriots, who sought to avoid its capture by the British Army during their nine-month occupation of Philadelphia.

After Washington and the Continental Army were defeated in the Battle of Brandywine in Chadds Ford Township, Pennsylvania on September 11, 1777, Philadelphia was left defenseless and American patriots began preparing for what they saw as an imminent British attack on the colonial capital. Pennsylvania's Supreme Executive Council ordered that 11 bells, including the Liberty Bell and ten bells then housed at Christ Church and St. Peter's Church in Philadelphia, be taken down and moved out of Philadelphia to protect them from the British, fearing their being melted down and cast into munitions. Two farmers and wagon masters, John Snyder and Henry Bartholomew, then transported the Liberty Bell north to present-day Allentown, where it was hidden under floorboards in the basement of Zion Reformed Church at 622 Hamilton Street in Center City Allentown, just prior to Philadelphia's September 1777 fall to the British.

=== 19th century ===
In 1803, the city, whose mail was previously received in neighboring Bethlehem, had a post office established inside Compass and Square Hotel inside the present-day Penn National Bank building at 645 Hamilton Street in Allentown. In the 1810 U.S. census, the city's population exceeded 700 residents, and the Commonwealth of Pennsylvania granted the city legal standing on March 18, 1811, incorporating it initially as the Borough of Northampton in what was then Northampton County. The new borough's first undertaking was ordering that cows be moved from public streets to pastures, which proved unpopular with residents. The following year, in 1812, the city became part of Lehigh County, which was partitioned from a western section of Northampton County.

Throughout the early 1800s, the city grew primarily as a court and market town. Northampton Bank, the city's first bank located at the northeast corner of Center Square, was chartered in July 1814, and the first Hamilton Street Bridge, a 530 feet (160 m)-long chain structure, was constructed to cross Lehigh River in the city. The bridge featured two suspended lanes, one for east and one for westbound traffic, and a toll house at the bridge's western end.

In 1829, Lehigh Canal, a 46.6 miles (75.0 km)-long canal on Lehigh River's east side, was completed for both ascending and descending navigation, which proved influential in expanding the transport of anthracite coal, then one of the most important domestic and industrial fuels, from Allentown to New York City, Philadelphia, and other major industrial centers. In 1855, the city's first railroad was built on the west side of the Lehigh River, and rail soon began surpassing river transport as the primary means for transporting anthracite through the city.

In 1838, the city's name was officially changed to Allentown. The city soon faced major challenges. In 1841, a flood swept away Hamilton Street Bridge, inflicting substantial damage near Lehigh River. Two years later, in 1843, excessive speculation by Northampton Bank led to the bank's failure, resulting in financial ruin for many bank customers. Five years later, on June 1, 1848, the city's central business district burned down in a large fire between 7th and 8th streets on Hamilton Street.

During the 1850s, however, the city began recovering. A new bridge was built across the Lehigh River, and brick buildings were constructed to replace wooden ones that burned down in the 1848 fire. In 1852, the first Allentown Fair, now one of the nation's longest continual annual fairs, was held.

==== American Civil War ====
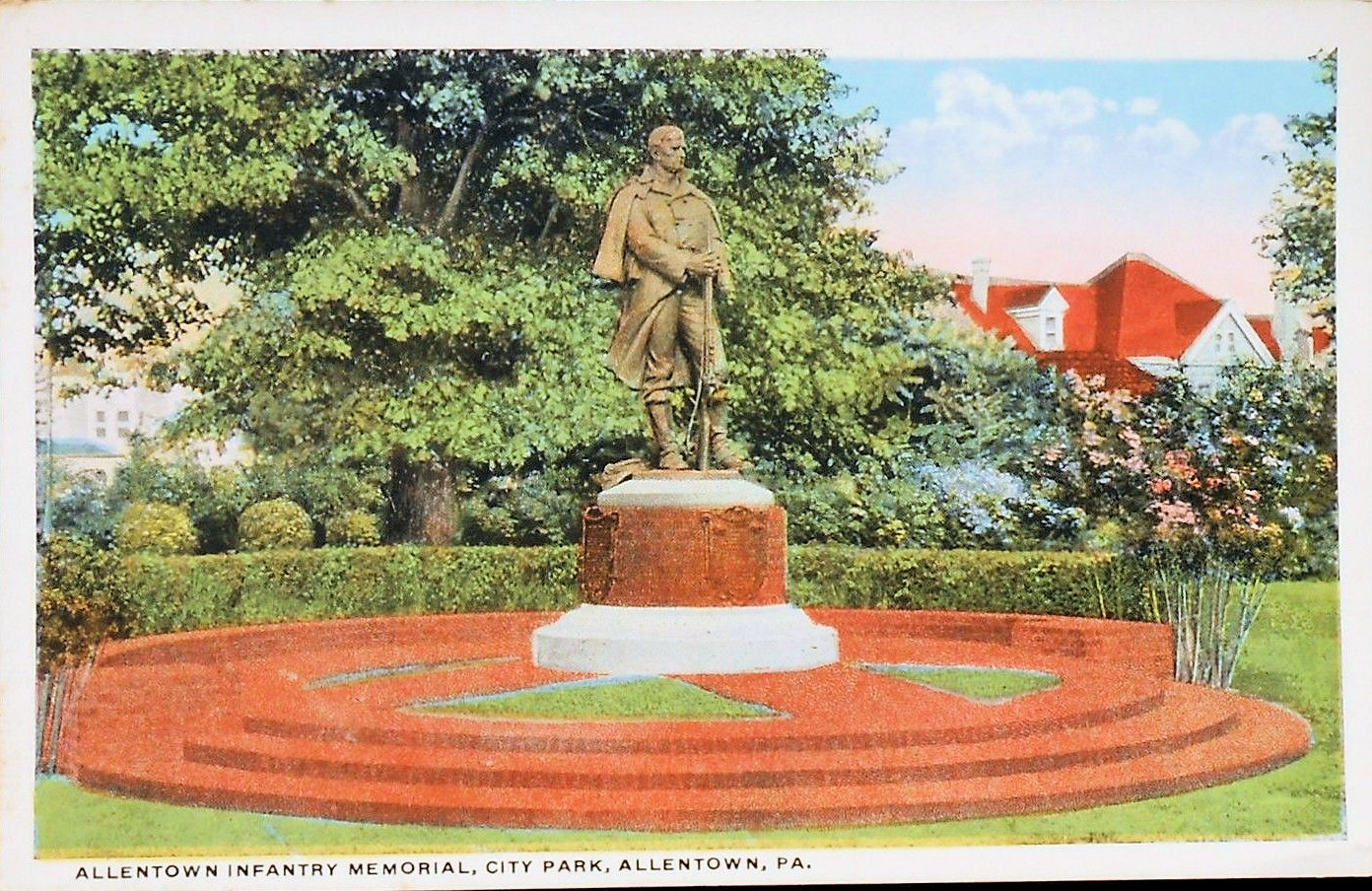
A 1920 postcard of West End Park on Linden Street featuring a statue of Ignatz Gresser, a Union army soldier from Allentown who was awarded the Medal of Honor for acts of valor during the Battle of Antietam

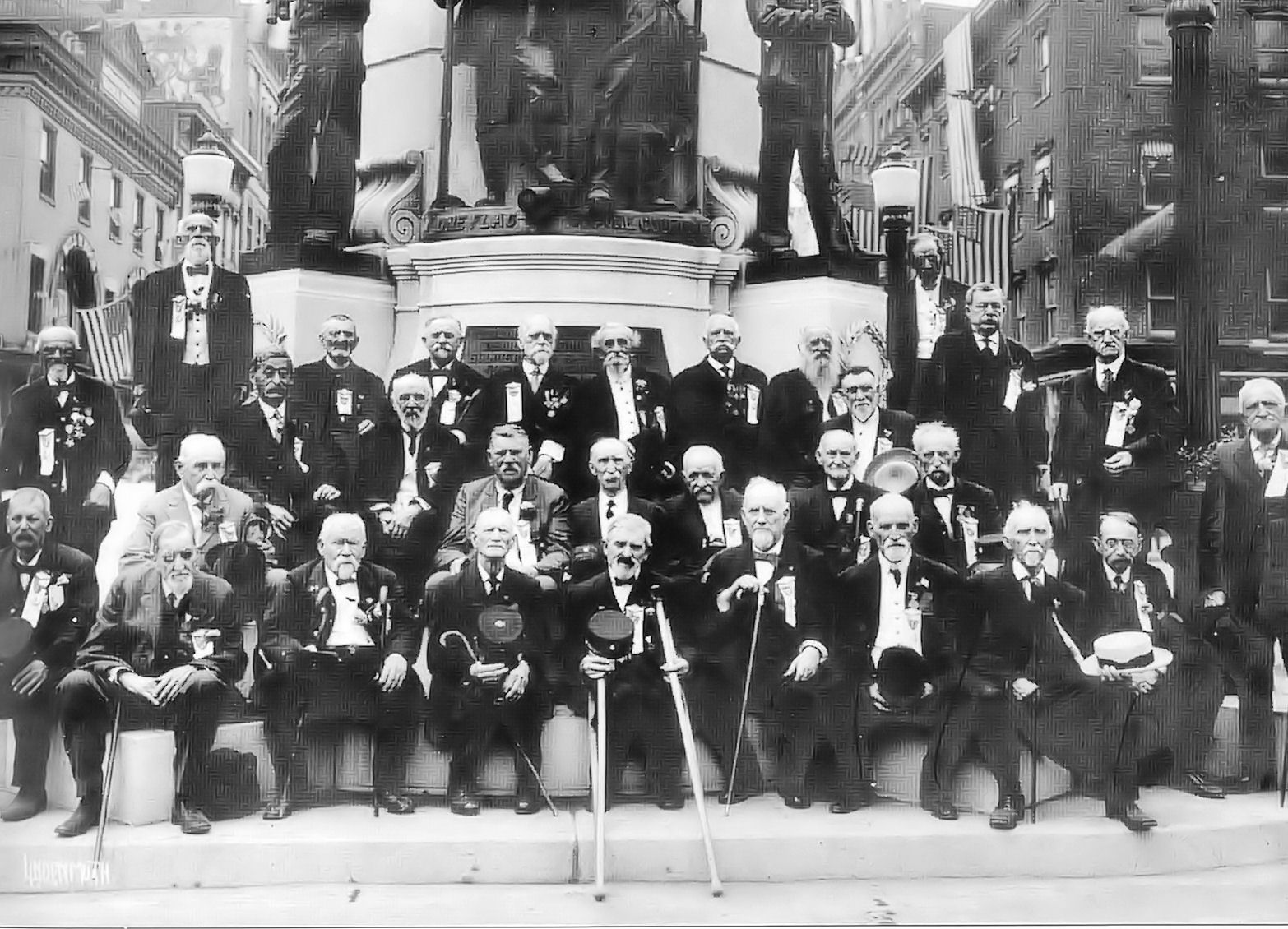
The 50th reunion of Allentown's First Defenders, a Union army unit during the Civil War, in front of Soldiers and Sailors Monument at Hamilton and S. 7th streets in Center City on Memorial Day in 1911

On April 13, 1861, with tensions between the North and South intensifying following the South's secession, residents of Lehigh and Northampton counties called a public meeting in Easton to discuss steps that could be taken to support the federal government. In the meeting, citizens voted to establish and equip the 1st Pennsylvania Volunteer Infantry, a new military unit, and placed Captain Samuel Yohe of Easton and Thomas W. Lynn in charge of it, awarding them the respective ranks of colonel and major. Tilghman H. Good of South Whitehall Township, previously captain of Allen Rifles, an Allentown-based militia, and commander of the 4th Pennsylvania Infantry Regiment, was placed in charge of the 1st Pennsylvania's Company I, which included his former Allen Rifles subordinates and members of Jordan Artillerist, another Allentown-based militia.

In April 1861, following the Confederate bombardment of Fort Sumter, these Allentown units were deployed in response to President Lincoln's call for 75,000 volunteers to defend the national capital of Washington, D.C. from Confederate attack. After protecting the nation's capital from April to July 1861, these volunteers were honorably discharged and returned home, though a significant number reenlisted to defend the Union as the Civil War escalated. After the Civil War's end, many of these soldiers were named Pennsylvania First Defenders in recognition of their role as one of the first five units to answer Lincoln's call for volunteers to defend the nation's capital.

===== 47th Regiment Pennsylvania Volunteer Infantry =====
On August 5, 1861, Andrew Gregg Curtin, the Civil War-era Pennsylvania governor, granted Tilghman H. Good authority to create the 47th Pennsylvania Infantry Regiment, a new unit commonly known as the 47th Pennsylvania Volunteers. Good secured the assistance of William H. Gausler of Allentown, who was commissioned as a major with the regiment's central command staff, and John Peter Shindel Gobin, a senior officer with Sunbury Guards in Northumberland County, who was repeatedly cited for valor and was promoted to colonel and ultimately as commanding officer of the regiment. Companies A and E of the regiment were recruited primarily from Easton and Northampton County; Companies B, G, I, and K were largely recruited from Allentown; Company C was recruited from Northumberland and Juniata counties; Company F was primarily composed of men from the Allentown suburb of Catasaqua; and Companies D and H were recruited from Perry County. The 47th Pennsylvania Volunteers achieved Union victories at the Battle of St. Johns Bluff in Florida (October 1–3, 1862) before suffering a costly defeat in the Second Battle of Pocotaligo in South Carolina (October 21–23, 1862). They were the only Pennsylvania regiment to fight in the Union army's Red River campaign across Louisiana in 1864.

While sustaining numerous casualties during the Red River campaign, the 47th Pennsylvania helped turn the Civil War in the Union's favor, contributing to influential military victories in General Sheridan's 1864 Shenandoah Valley campaign across Virginia, including in the Battles of Berryville, Opequan, Fisher's Hill, and Cedar Creek, and then again contributing to the nation's defense following Lincoln's assassination on April 15, 1865. Other known Union military units from Allentown included the 5th, 41st, 128th, and 176th Pennsylvania Infantries.

On October 19, 1899, Allentown erected and dedicated Soldiers and Sailors Monument, at Hamilton and S. 7th streets in Center City, where it still stands, in honor of these Union soldiers from Allentown and local Lehigh Valley towns and boroughs who were killed in defense of the Union during the Civil War.

==== Industrialization ====
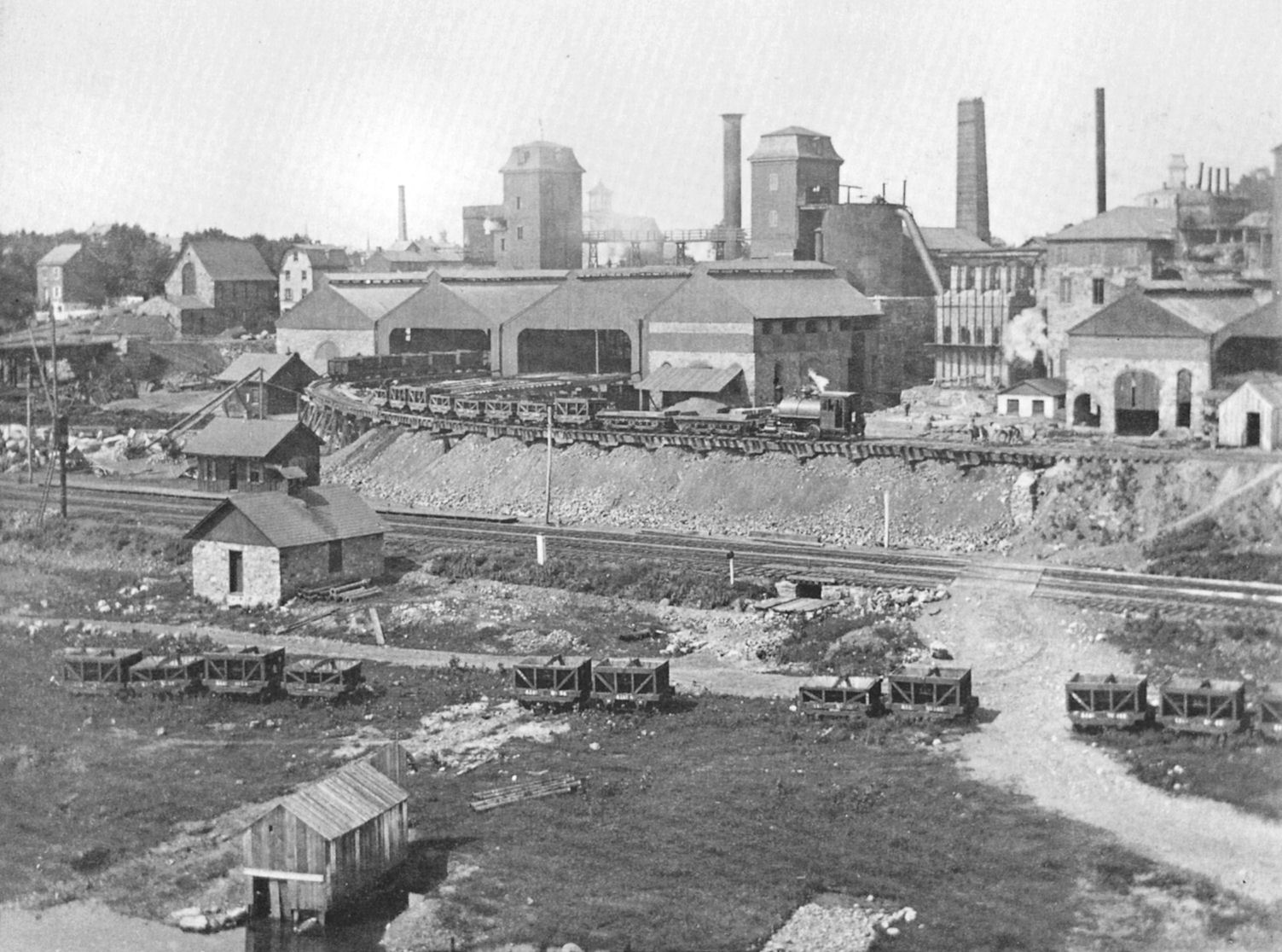
Allentown Rolling Mill Company, a sizable 19th and early 20th century iron and steel manufacturer on Washington Street in Allentown, in 1889

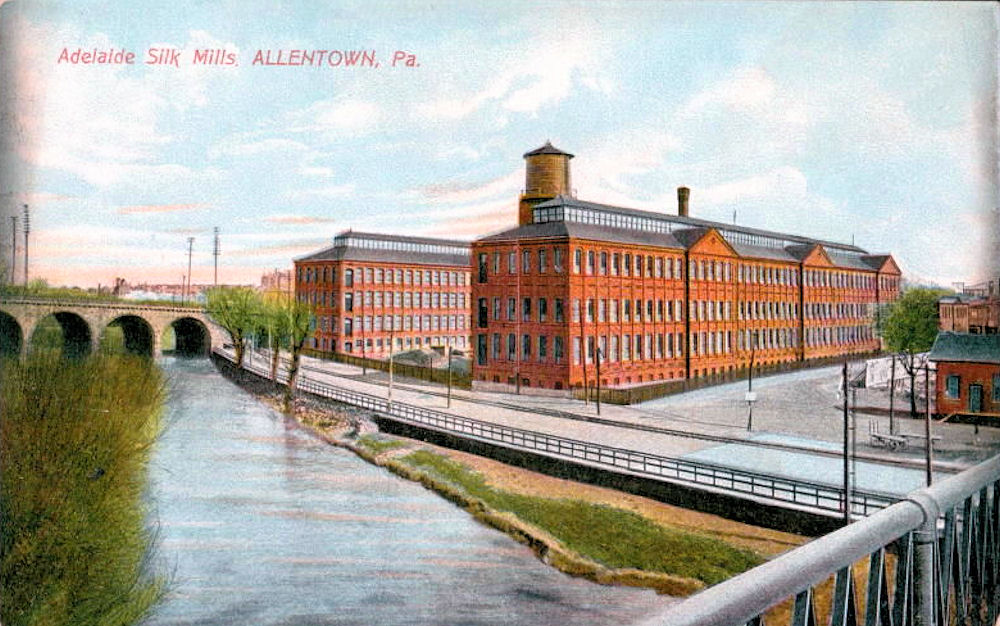
Adelaide Silk Mill in Allentown, which opened in 1881 and was one of the world's largest silk mills throughout the early 20th century, in 1910

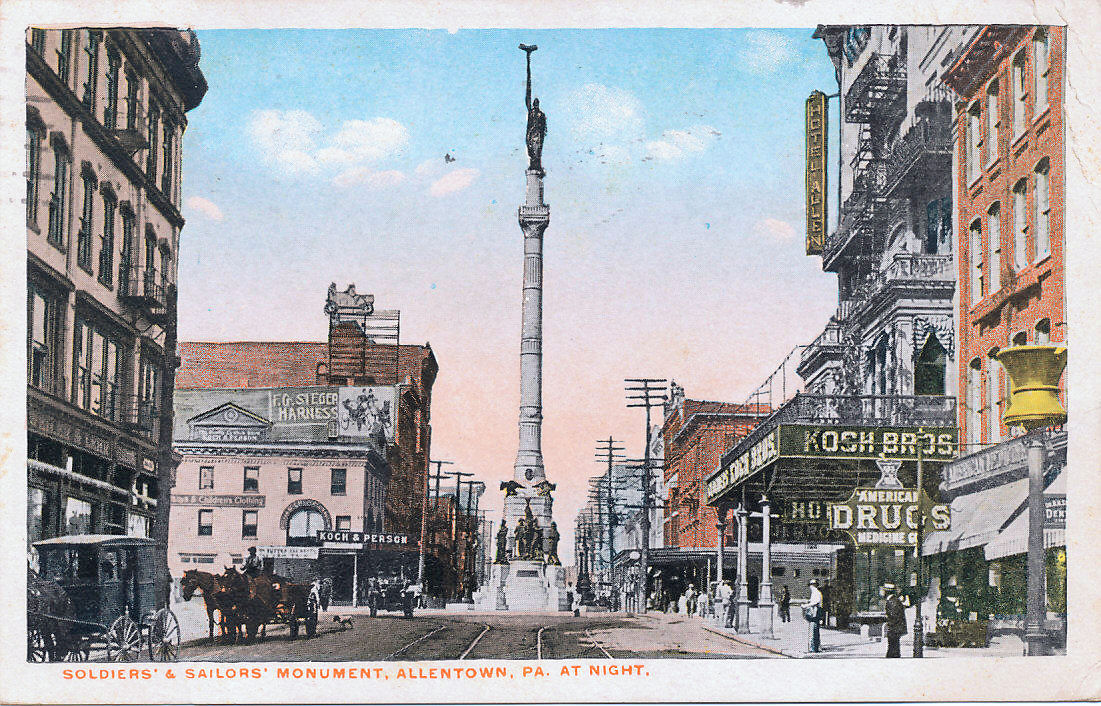
Allentown's Center Square at N. 7th and Hamilton streets in present-day Center City, in 1910

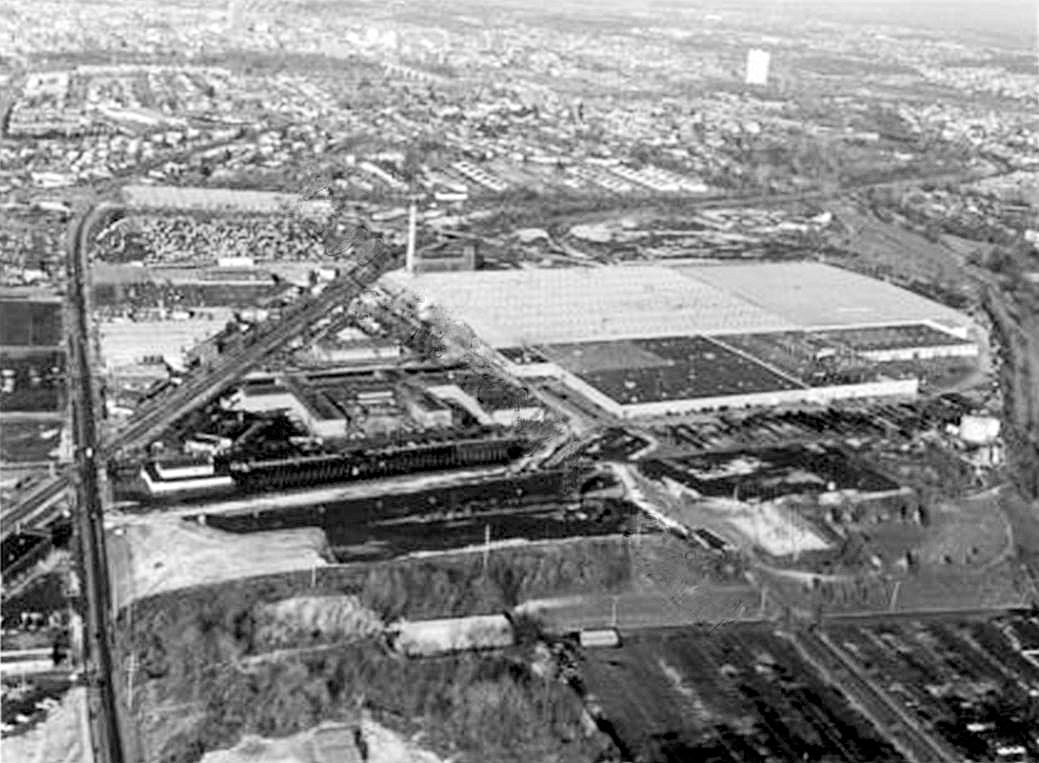
Mack Trucks' assembly plant in Allentown in 1945; the company was headquartered in Allentown from 1905 until 2008, when it relocated to Greensboro, North Carolina.

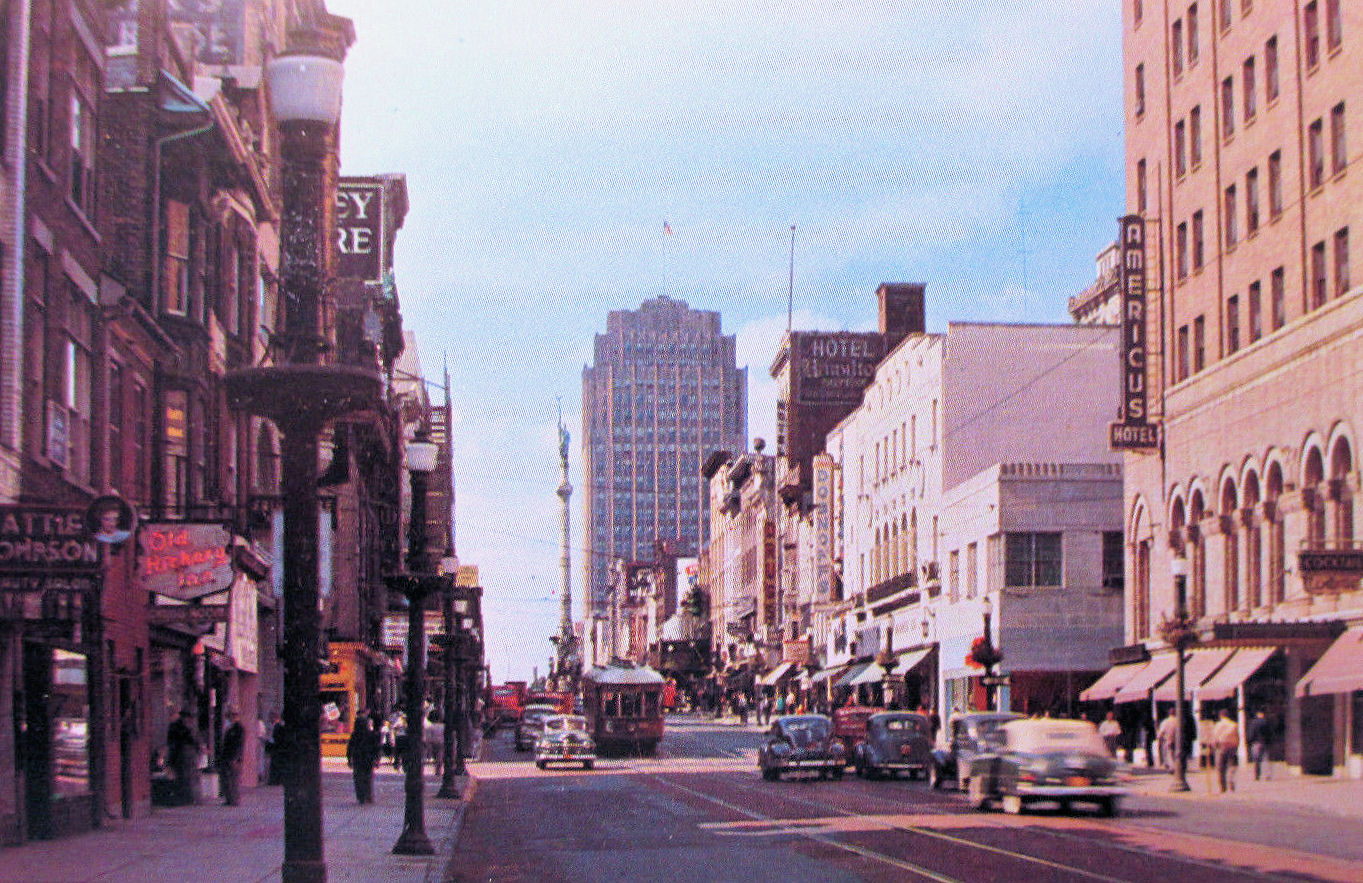
West Hamilton and 6th streets in Allentown in 1950

In the late 18th century, Allentown began growing slowly as a hub for commerce and industrialization and as a colonial era population center. Prior to the American Revolution, there were 54 homes and approximately 330 residents. In 1782, there were 59 houses and over 100 cows. In 1783, the town was described by a visitor, "One gets a glimpse of many good stone houses, many of them very neat, and everything about the premises shows good order and attention. The people are mainly German who speak bad English and distressing German." In 1795, Gazette of the United States described Allentown as:

A handsome and flourishing town of Northampton County, pleasantly situated on the point of land formed by the junction of the Jordan Creek and Little Lehigh. It is regularly laid out and contains about ninety dwellings, a German Lutheran and a Calvinist (Zion) Church, an Academy and three merchant mills.

In 1792, land north of Allentown was purchased by Lehigh Coal & Navigation Company for coal mining, but it initially proved difficult to transport the region's high quality anthracite coal over what was then a primitive trail system. Only a limited amount of anthracite was mined until 1818, when the company began constructing Lehigh Canal, which allowed coal to be transported from Mauch Chunk, later renamed Jim Thorpe, down the Lehigh River to the river's confluence with the Delaware River in Easton.

In the late 18th century, Allentown's industrial development accelerated. David Deshler, Allentown's first shopkeeper, opened a sawmill in the city in 1782. By 1814, industrial plants in Allentown included flour mills, sawmills, two saddle makers, a tannery and tan yard, a woolen mill, a card weaving plant, two gunsmiths, two tobacconists, two clockmakers, and two printers. In 1818, the opening of Lehigh Canal transformed Allentown and the surrounding Lehigh Valley from a rural agricultural area dominated by German-speaking people into one of the nation's first urbanized industrialized areas, expanding the city's commercial and industrial capacity. Allentown underwent significant industrialization, and the city began evolving into a major national center for heavy industry and manufacturing.

In the 1840s, iron ore beds were discovered in hills around Allentown, and a furnace was constructed in 1846 by Allentown Iron Core Company for production of pig iron, a vital component used in the manufacturing of steel. The furnace opened in 1847 under supervision of Samuel Lewis, an expert in iron production, and was followed by the opening of other Allentown plants for production of a wide variety of metal products. In 1860, several smaller iron companies merged to create Allentown Rolling Mill Company, which became Allentown's largest iron company and contributed to the region's emergence as a major national source for iron ore.

In 1850, Leh's, a shoe and ready-to-wear clothing store, was opened in the city by Henry Leh. By 1861, as the Civil War commenced, Leh's emerged as a major source of military boots for Union troops. In addition to Leh's, eight brick yards, a saw mill, a paint factory, two additional shoe factories, a piano factory, flour mills, breweries, and distilleries opened in Allentown during the Civil War era. In 1855, the first railroads to reach Allentown opened, representing direct competition to Lehigh Canal for coal transport. Lehigh and Susquehanna Railroad ordered four locomotives, and train stations were built in Allentown, Easton, and Mauch Chunk. In September 1855, the railroad became operational with Central Railroad of New Jersey providing transport between Allentown and New York City. Transport between Allentown and Philadelphia also became available over Perkiomen Railroad, which operated between Norristown and Freemansburg.

With industrialization, Allentown emerged as a major regional and national center for banking and finance. In 1860, William H. Ainey founded Allentown Savings and served as its first president. In 1864, Second National Bank of Allentown was formed, and Ainey was elected its first president, a position he held until his death. Ainey contributed to Allentown's industrial and retail growth, helping finance Iowa Barb Wire Company, which was later absorbed by American Steel & Wire, Pioneer Silk Factory, Palace Silk Mill, and Allentown Spinning Company.

In the late 1870s, however, Allentown's iron industry collapsed, leaving the city economically depressed. Efforts were made to diversify the city's industrial base, including convincing Phoenix Manufacturing Company to open a silk mill in the city. In 1886, Adelaide Mill at Race and Court streets prompted the opening of Pioneer Silk Mill, and the city quickly emerged as a national leader in silk manufacturing. By the late 19th century, the silk industry emerged as Allentown's largest industry, and it remained the city's largest industry through the end of the 20th century. In 1914, there were 26 silk mills in the city. By 1928, with the introduction of rayon, the number of Allentown silk mills grew to 85. In the 1940s, during the height of Allentown's silk industry, over 10,000 people were employed in the industry in the city.

In 1883, Allentown Boiler Works was founded in Allentown by Charles Collum, whose partner, John D. Knouse, built a large facility at 3rd and Gordon streets in Allentown's First Ward near Lehigh Valley Railroad's yard, which later became Kline's Island. The company manufactured iron products, some of which were used in high-profile construction projects, including construction of the White House in Washington, D.C., and the U.S. Military Academy at West Point. The company's boilers and kilns were used in the production of iron products, which were sold nationally and internationally to customers in Canada, Cuba, and the Philippines.

Through the end of World War I, brickworks flourished in Allentown. Clay unearthed in various sections of the city and its suburbs was used in manufacturing building brick and fire brick, the first Allentown products shipped by rail and sold nationally. A vibrant food processing industry also began emerging, due largely to the arrival of predominantly German immigrant bakers, who were among the city's first settlers. In 1887, Wilson Arbogast and Morris C. Bastian formed Arbogast and Bastian, which provided large scale commercial slaughtering.

In 1896, Max Hess, a retailer from Perth Amboy, New Jersey, visited Allentown and began developing the city's first department store. He and his brother Charles opened Hess Brothers at 9th and Hamilton streets. Hess's developed a reputation for flamboyance, offering the latest European fashion apparel. Hess's opening was followed by the opening of the city's second major department store, Zollinger-Harned Company, located in the Zollinger-Harned Company Building on Hamilton Street.

Allentown also began emerging as a major national center for beer brewing. Notable Allentown-based breweries included Horlacher Brewery (founded 1897, closed 1978), Neuweiler Brewery (founded 1875, closed 1968), and Schaefer Beer, whose brewery was later acquired by Pabst and Guinness and is now owned by Boston Beer Company, brewer of Samuel Adams beer.

=== 20th century ===
In 1905, Jack and Gus Mack moved Mack Trucks, their motor company, from Brooklyn to Allentown, taking over the foundries of Weaver-Hirsh on S. 10th Street. By 1914, Mack Trucks developed a global reputation for manufacturing sturdy and reliable trucks and vehicles. Many were sent to Western Front battlefields in France just before the U.S. entered World War I in April 1917. The British Army nicknamed Mack AC's five and seven-ton trucks the "Bulldog", which was later adopted as the company's corporate brand. Throughout the 20th century, Mack Trucks grew substantially, ultimately including eight Allentown-based manufacturing plants.

In the early 20th century, largely as a result of Pennsylvania missionaries, Christians from Wadi al-Nasara in Syria began settling in Allentown. Syrian Christians ultimately developed a significant presence in the city, based largely in Allentown's Sixth Ward. As of 2015, there were an estimated 5,200 Syrian Americans in Allentown and surrounding Lehigh Valley cities and towns.

Like several other regions in Pennsylvania, Pennsylvania German-speaking residents existed in Allentown into the early 20th century. Pennsylvania Guide, compiled during the Great Depression by the Writers' Project of the Works Progress Administration, described the impact of the Pennsylvania Dutch on Allentown's linguistic landscape, reporting in 1940 that:

Allentown is among the few large Pennsylvania cities where newspapers still carry columns written in the dialect. Although English predominates on the streets, there is a tendency to enunciate the 'v' with open lips, to soften the hard 'g' into 'ch,' and to use too frequently such words as 'already,' 'yet,' and 'once.' Here also are heard such colloquialisms as 'the pie is all,' (all gone) and 'it wonders (mystifies) me.'

— Federal Writers' Project, "Part II: Cities and Towns", Pennsylvania: A Guide to the Keystone State (1940)

In October 1945, following the end of World War II, Western Electric opened a plant on Union Boulevard in Allentown. Six years later, in October 1951, the company manufactured and released the world's first transistor, produced at the Allentown-based plant, and the Allentown-based company emerged as a leader in the nation's post-war electronics revolution.

By the mid-20th century, Allentown was a major retailing and entertainment center distinct and separate from Philadelphia and New York City. Hess's, Leh's, and Zollinger department stores led to retail sector growth in the city, and dozens of smaller retail stores, restaurants, hotels, banks, and professional offices emerged in present-day Center City, which was then referred to as downtown Allentown. At least seven cinemas and stage theaters were developed on Hamilton Street between 5th and 10th streets.

==== Deindustrialization and Rust Belt ====
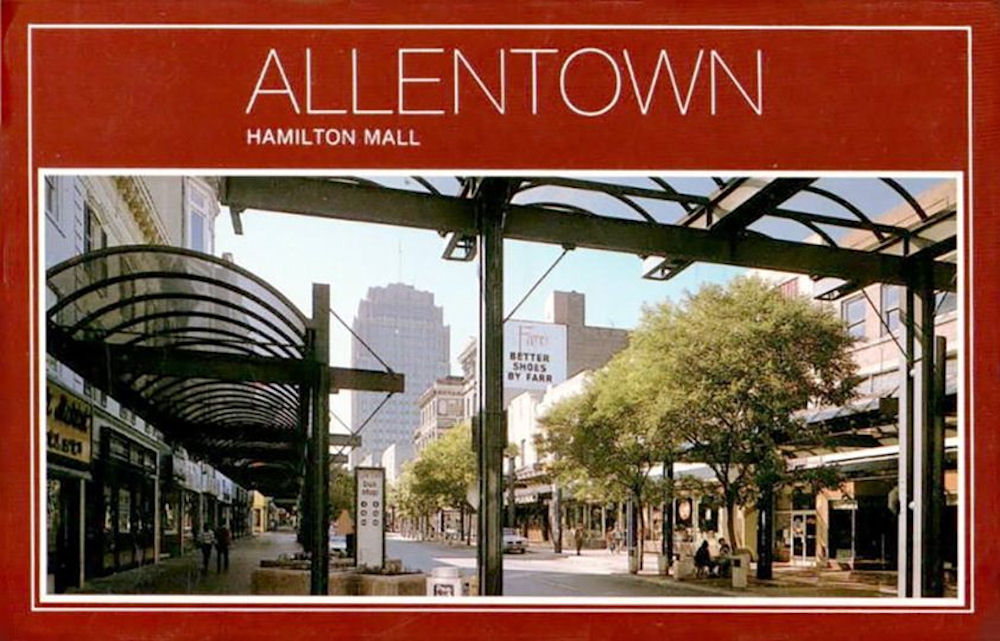
A 1974 postcard of Hamilton Mall in Center City, an ultimately failed attempt to redevelop Allentown's central business district as residents began fleeing the city for its suburbs in the 1970s

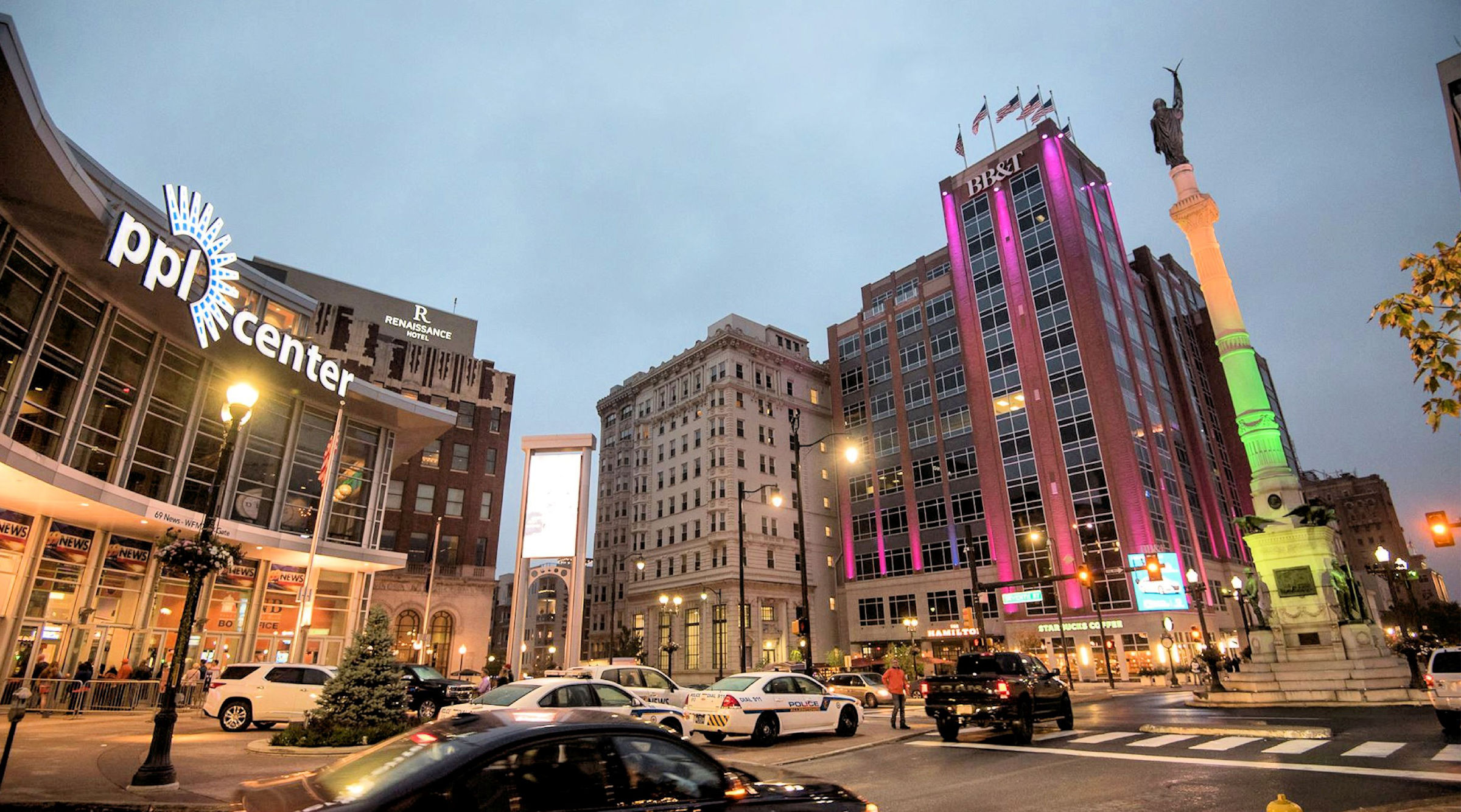
The entrance to PPL Center (on left) in Center City in October 2018

By the mid-1960s, Allentown's economy had been booming for decades, but the city's rising taxes and regulations prohibited the city's expansion, leading many Allentown residents, especially those from the post-World War II baby boom generation, to flee Allentown for its suburbs. Salisbury, South Whitehall, and Whitehall townships each had large areas of farmland, which were prime locations for residential real estate development. A significant portion of Allentown's working class began migrating to the newer and more affordable housing developments in these suburbs, which offered lower taxes, more green space, less crime, and newer schools.

Throughout the late 20th century, the departure of Allentown residents for its suburbs began representing a major challenge to the city's government and school district, both of which began experiencing significantly diminished resources. Allentown School District's financial challenges, in turn, further increased working class flight to the city's suburbs, creating a sea change in the city's demographics. With the departure of many working-class families from older Center City neighborhoods, many of the city's homes were sold to landlords who converted them into inexpensive multifamily apartments, a considerable portion of which were transformed into government-subsidized housing projects, which was then permitted under the city's lax zoning and city codes.

With Allentown's neighborhoods and school system declining, the city focused on attempting to develop its Hamilton Street retail district, largely ignoring Allentown neighborhoods not located in Center City. This, in turn, further increased the flight of Allentown residents to the city's suburbs, leading to the development of a growing number of suburban shopping centers and services, which were built to accommodate these expanding suburban communities. In 1966, Whitehall Mall, the first closed shopping mall north of Philadelphia, opened in Whitehall Township. Ten years later, in 1976, Lehigh Valley Mall, a second suburban closed mall even larger than Whitehall Mall, opened north of U.S. Route 22 in Fullerton. Stores in Allentown's downtown shopping district began closing, replaced with stores whose customers were less affluent and large downtown areas that were razed and replaced with parking lots. In an attempt to compete with fast-growing and newer suburban shopping areas, the downtown Allentown business district was rebuilt with a multiblock row of stores known as Hamilton Mall, featuring newly covered sidewalks and managed traffic patterns. The city's economic plight began being cited as a prominent example of a Rust Belt city. In 1982, Billy Joel released the single "Allentown", the lead song on The Nylon Curtain album, which addressed the city's economic plight in the late 20th century.

The effort to rebuild the downtown shopping district ultimately proved unsuccessful, and two of the city's major department stores, Leh's and Zollingers, closed by 1990. The third, Hess's, was sold to The Bon-Ton in 1994, which closed its Hamilton Mall location two years later, in 1996. In 1993, Corporate Center, the city's new flagship business center on N. 7th Street, fell victim to a large sinkhole, leading to its condemnation and ultimate demolition. Combined with challenges confronting Center City, Allentown also was heavily impacted by a significant downturn in manufacturing throughout the U.S. Northeast, which began undergoing and suffering from deindustrialization, a product of foreign competition, trade policies, and relatively higher U.S.-based manufacturing costs. Many Allentown factories and corporations began closing or relocating.

=== 21st century ===
Responding to the late 20th century economic downturn in the city, Allentown began seeking to diversify its economy in the early 21st century. Allentown's economy saw growth in its service, health care, transportation, warehousing, and some manufacturing industries. In 2009, the Neighborhood Improvement Zone (NIZ), created by the Pennsylvania General Assembly, sought to address Allentown's economic challenges and encourage the city's development and revitalization. The NIZ includes approximately 128 acres (52 hectares) in Center City and the city's riverfront district on the west side of the Lehigh River.

In 2006, Agere Systems, formerly Western Electric, was acquired by LSI Corporation, and the company relocated to San Jose, California. Three years later, in 2009, Mack Trucks relocated to Greensboro, North Carolina, and many Allentown-based factories downsized considerably or ceased operations entirely.

In 2014, Center City underwent major restructuring, including constructing and opening PPL Center, a 10,500-capacity indoor arena, which hosts the Lehigh Valley Phantoms, a professional American Hockey League ice hockey team, and other sports, entertainment, and concert events. A full-service Renaissance Hotel also opened in Center City, and older office buildings were redeveloped.

In 2024, U.S. News & World Report ranked Allentown as one of the "150 Best Places to Live in the U.S." and the nation's fifth-best city to retire.

== Geography ==
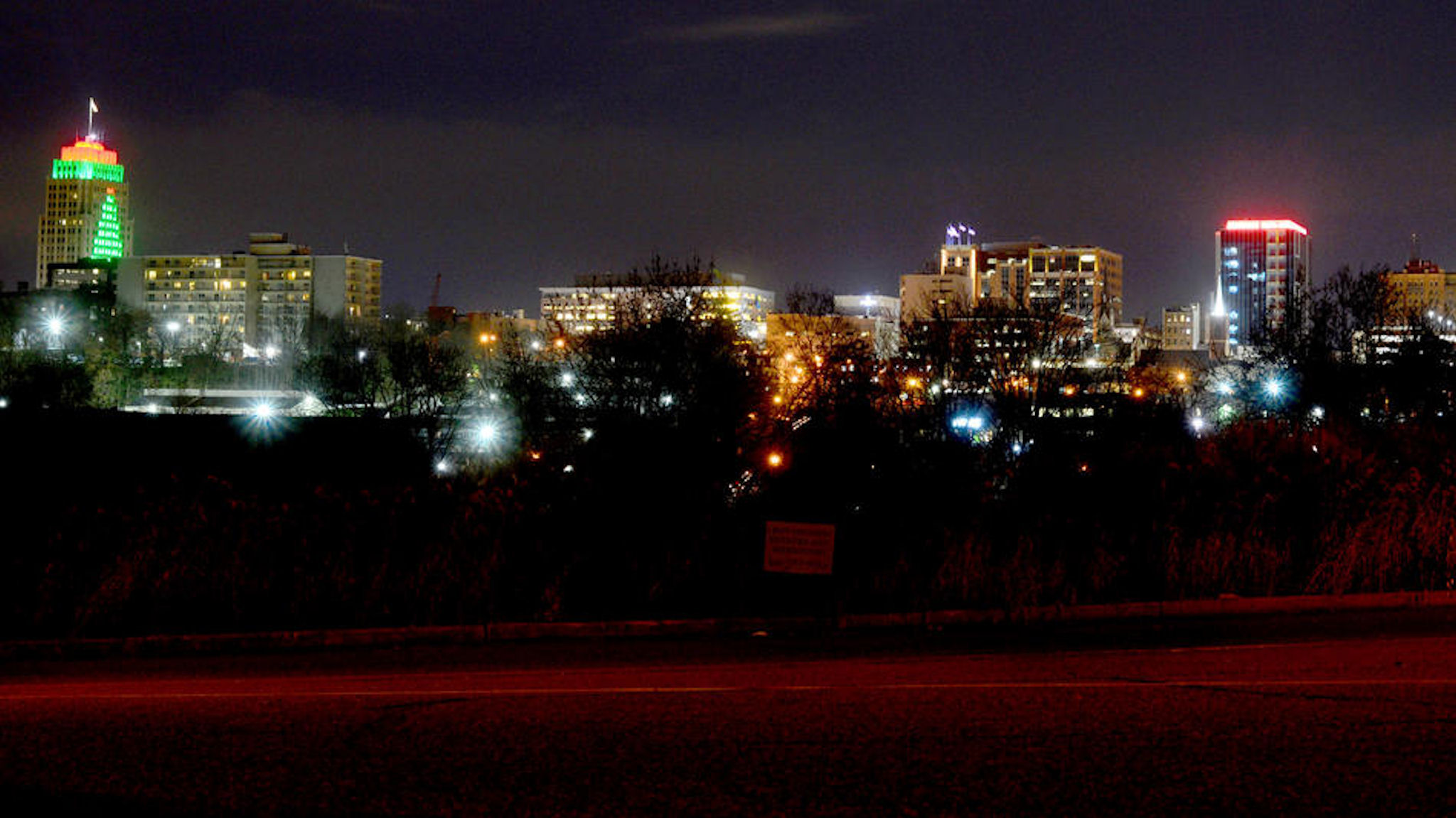
The Allentown skyline at Christmas in 2017

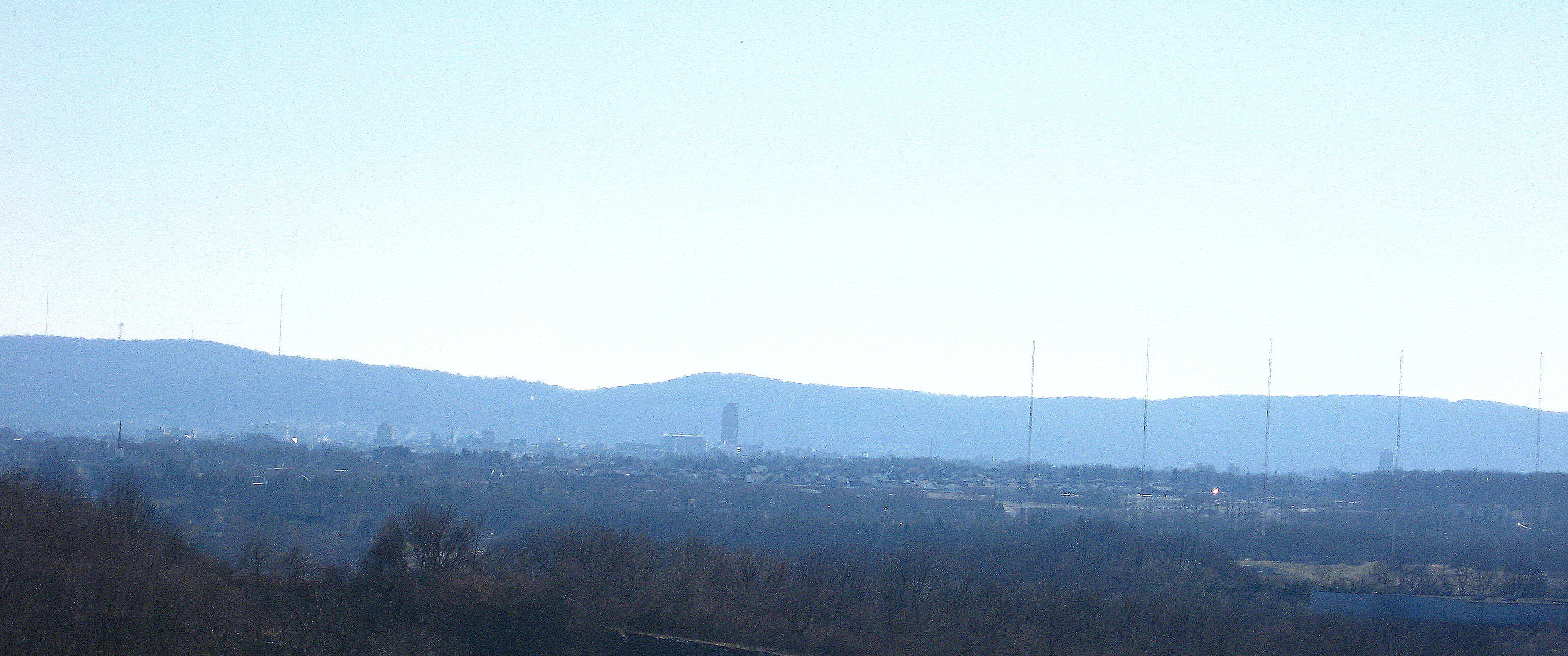
South Mountain (in background), part of the Appalachian Mountain range, with Allentown (in foreground) in December 2010

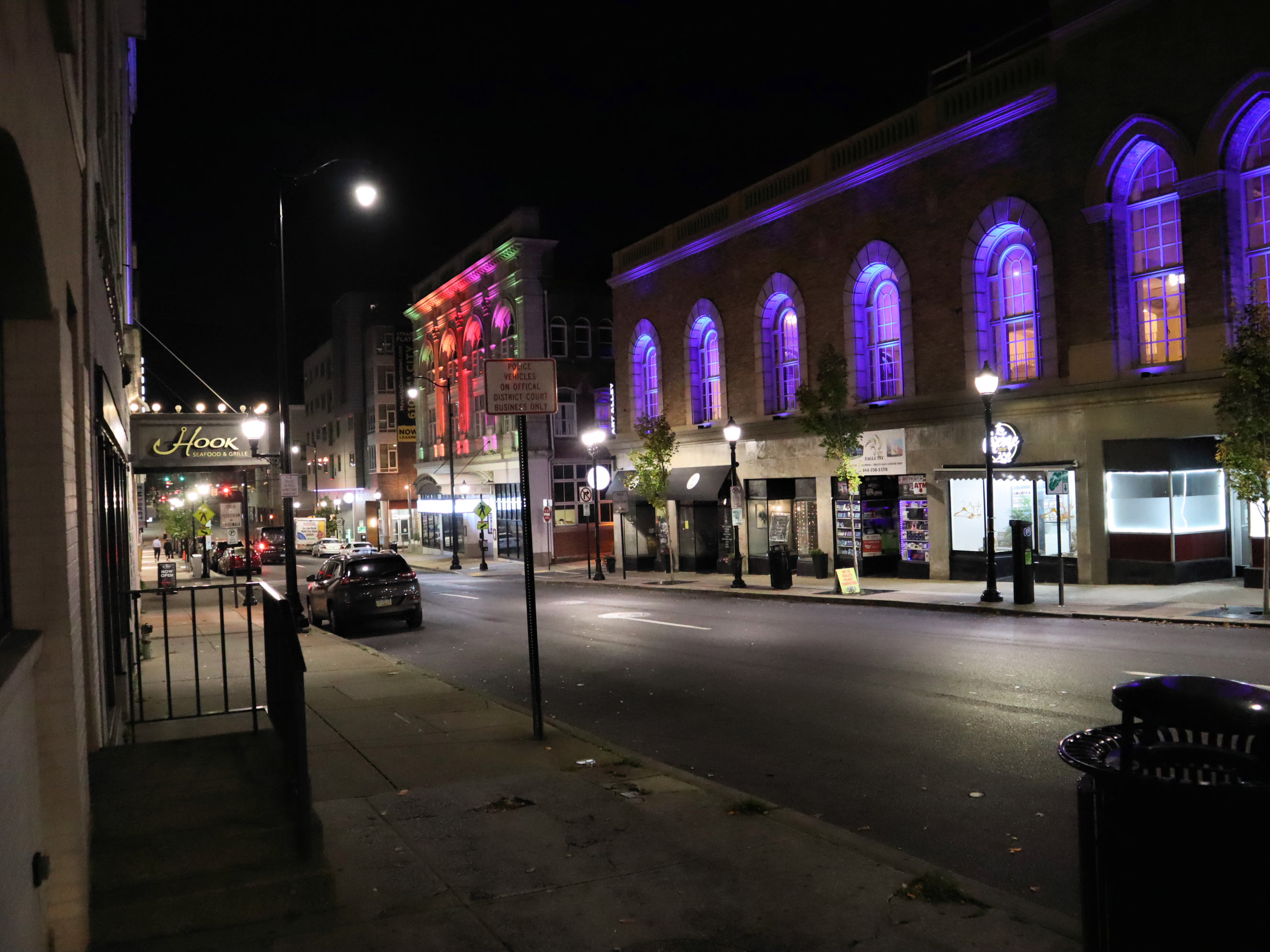
Center City at night in October 2020

=== Topography ===
Allentown's geographic boundaries include a total area of 18.0 square miles (46.6 km^{2}). Of this, 17.8 square miles (46.1 km^{2}) is land and 0.2 square miles (0.5 km^{2}) is water, according to the U.S. Census Bureau. Bodies of water include Jordan Creek and its tributary, Little Lehigh Creek, which join in the city and empty into Lehigh River. Other bodies of water in Allentown include Lake Muhlenberg in Cedar Creek Parkway and a pond in Trexler Park.

==== Adjacent counties ====
Allentown is located in the Lehigh Valley, an eastern Pennsylvania geographic valley located between two Appalachian mountain ridges, Blue Mountain, which varies from 1,000 feet (300 m) to 1,600 feet (490 m) in height about 17 miles (27 km) north of the city, and South Mountain, a ridge of 500 feet (150 m) to 1,000 feet (300 m) in height bordering the city's southern edge. The Lehigh Valley includes both Lehigh and Northampton counties.

The Lehigh Valley's adjacent counties are Carbon and Monroe counties to its north, Bucks County to its southeast, Montgomery County to its south, Berks and Schuylkill counties to its west, and Warren County, New Jersey to its east.

=== Cityscape and neighborhoods ===
Center City Allentown includes the downtown area and its 7th Street retail and residential corridor, which is the city's central business district and the location of most of its city, county, and federal government buildings. To the east of Center City are The Wards, residential areas developed during the late 19th century and early 20th century industrial boom. Just east of the Lehigh River are the city's East Side residential neighborhoods, most of which border various routes to neighboring Bethlehem. South of Center City across Little Lehigh Creek are the city's South Side neighborhoods, which border Emmaus. Allentown's West End, with a mix of commercial corridors, cultural centers, and larger single-family residences, begins approximately west of 15th Street.

Center City's tallest building is the PPL Building at 322 feet (98 m). In addition to the PPL Building, Center City commercial office buildings include the Dime Savings and Trust Company building, which features the city's Art Deco architecture, which was highly popular in Allentown and New York City in the 1920s and 1930s. One City Center, Two City Center, and other commercial buildings are located in Center City.

An 8,500-seat indoor arena, PPL Center, which hosts the Lehigh Valley Phantoms of the American Hockey League, opened in August 2014 at 701 Hamilton Street in Center City. Other Center City historic and recreational landmarks include Allentown Art Museum, Baum School of Art, Lehigh County Historical Society, and Miller Symphony Hall.

In January 2015, two major hotels, Americus Hotel and a Marriott, opened in Center City.

==== Architecture ====
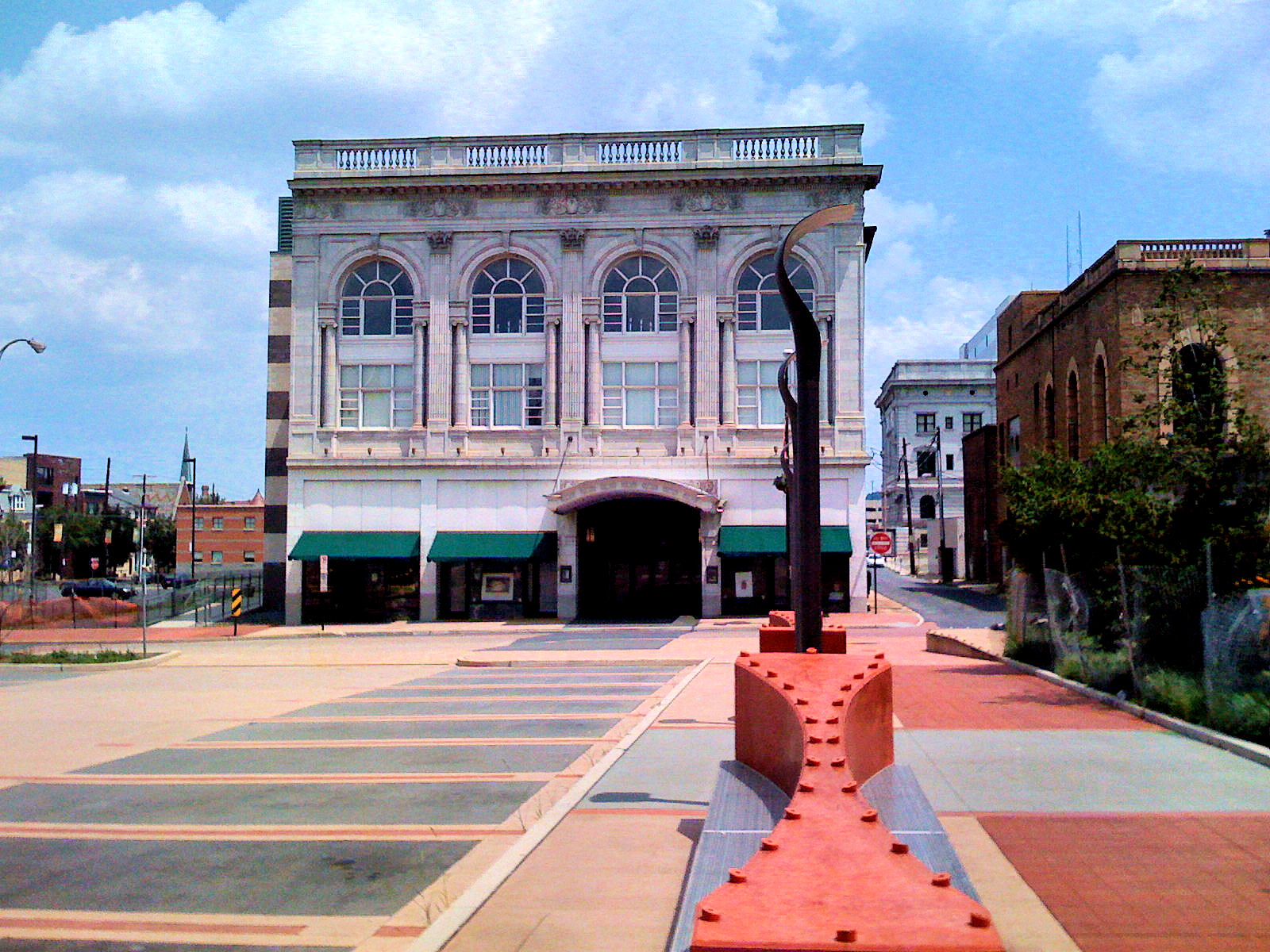
Miller Symphony Hall on N. 6th Street, home of the Allentown Symphony Orchestra, in July 2008

Allentown is characterized by a large stock of historic homes, commercial structures, and century-old industrial buildings reflecting its standing as one of the nation's earliest urban centers. Center City's neighborhoods include Victorian and terraced rowhouses. West Park includes mostly Victorian and American Craftsman-style architecture. Houses on Allentown's tree-lined streets in the West End were built mostly between the 1920s and 1940s. Houses in Allentown's East and South Sides are a mixture of architectural styles and are generally single and twin family homes built between the 1940s and 1960s; both areas include some older Victorian homes. Allentown has many loft apartments in converted mills and historic brick manufacturing buildings and modern and historic high-rise apartment buildings in Center City.

Allentown has three primary historic districts: Old Allentown, the Old Fairgrounds, and West Park. Old Allentown and Old Fairgrounds are Center City neighborhoods, which hold a joint house tour organized by the Old Allentown Preservation Association (OAPA) annually in September. West Park also offers a tour of its Victorian and Craftsman-style homes.

The PPL Building, at 2 N. 9th Street, is Allentown's tallest building at 322 feet (98 m). The building, which opened on July 16, 1928, was designed by New York City architectural firm Helme, Corbett, and Harrison, and Wallace Harrison, one of the firm's partners, served as the building's primary designer. The building was later a prototype for Art Deco architecture in Manhattan, including Rockefeller Center and other building structures. Built between 1926 and 1928, the PPL Building's exterior decorative friezes were designed by Alexander Archipenko. The building has been illuminated every night since its opening in 1928. In clear weather at night, the PPL Building's nighttime illumination is visible as far north as the Blue Mountain Ski Area in Palmerton. The building's exterior is featured in multiple scenes in the 1954 movie Executive Suite.

Miller Symphony Hall at 23 N. 6th Street opened in 1896 and served initially as the city's public market; the 1,100 seat facility is now home to the Allentown Symphony Orchestra. The structure was converted to a theater in 1899 by architect J. B. McElfatrick's firm, and was initially named the Lyric Theater. Miller Symphony Hall, one of roughly a dozen famous McElfatrick designs still standing in the nation, has been used for burlesque shows, vaudeville, silent films, symphony orchestras, and other entertainment for over a century. Other Allentown-based performing arts facilities and programs include Pennsylvania Sinfonia, Community Concerts of Allentown, Allentown Band, and Community Music School of the Lehigh Valley.

=== Climate ===
Under the Köppen climate classification, Allentown falls within the hot-summer humid continental climate (Dfa) if the 0 °C (32 °F) isotherm is used or the humid subtropical climate (Cfa) if the −3 °C (27 °F) isotherm is used. Summers are typically warm and muggy. Fall and spring are generally mild. Winter is cool to cold. Precipitation is almost uniformly distributed throughout the year.

The average temperature in January is 30.1 °F (−1.1 °C) and the lowest officially recorded temperature was −15 °F (−26 °C) on January 21, 1994. July averages 75.6 °F (24.2 °C) and the highest temperature on record was 105 °F (41 °C) on July 3, 1966. January temperatures average below freezing. Seven months average above 50 °F (10.0 °C), and two months average above 71.6 °F (22.0 °C).

Snowfall is variable with some winters bringing light snow and others bringing multiple and significant snowstorms. Average snowfall is 33.1 inches (84 cm) seasonally with February receiving the highest snowfall at just under 11 inches (280 mm). Rainfall is generally spread throughout the year with eight to 12 days of precipitation monthly at an average annual rate of 43.5 inches (110.5 cm). Allentown falls under the U.S. Department of Agriculture's 6b Plant hardiness zone.

Climate data for Allentown, Pennsylvania at Lehigh Valley International Airport, 1991–2020 normals, (Note: Mean monthly maxima and minima (i.e. the highest and lowest temperature readings during an entire month or year) calculated based on data at said location from 1981 to 2010.) extremes 1922–present (Note: Official records for Allentown were kept at Allentown Gas Company from March 1922 to December 1943, and at Lehigh Valley Int'l since January 1944. For more information, see ThreadEx.)
Month	Jan	Feb	Mar	Apr	May	Jun	Jul	Aug	Sep	Oct	Nov	Dec	Year
Record high °F (°C)	72 (22)	81 (27)	87 (31)	93 (34)	97 (36)	100 (38)	105 (41)	100 (38)	99 (37)	93 (34)	81 (27)	72 (22)	105 (41)
Mean maximum °F (°C)	60.2 (15.7)	60.6 (15.9)	70.6 (21.4)	83.2 (28.4)	89.3 (31.8)	92.6 (33.7)	94.8 (34.9)	92.8 (33.8)	89.2 (31.8)	80.4 (26.9)	70.9 (21.6)	61.7 (16.5)	95.9 (35.5)
Mean daily maximum °F (°C)	38.4 (3.6)	41.6 (5.3)	50.8 (10.4)	63.4 (17.4)	73.5 (23.1)	81.9 (27.7)	86.4 (30.2)	84.3 (29.1)	77.4 (25.2)	65.5 (18.6)	53.8 (12.1)	43.1 (6.2)	63.3 (17.4)
Daily mean °F (°C)	30.1 (−1.1)	32.4 (0.2)	40.7 (4.8)	51.8 (11.0)	62.0 (16.7)	70.9 (21.6)	75.6 (24.2)	73.6 (23.1)	66.3 (19.1)	54.6 (12.6)	43.9 (6.6)	35.0 (1.7)	53.1 (11.7)
Mean daily minimum °F (°C)	21.8 (−5.7)	23.2 (−4.9)	30.5 (−0.8)	40.3 (4.6)	50.6 (10.3)	59.9 (15.5)	64.7 (18.2)	62.8 (17.1)	55.2 (12.9)	43.8 (6.6)	34.1 (1.2)	26.8 (−2.9)	42.8 (6.0)
Mean minimum °F (°C)	4.2 (−15.4)	5.9 (−14.5)	14.1 (−9.9)	25.9 (−3.4)	35.3 (1.8)	46.5 (8.1)	53.7 (12.1)	51.1 (10.6)	39.9 (4.4)	28.7 (−1.8)	19.1 (−7.2)	11.7 (−11.3)	1.8 (−16.8)
Record low °F (°C)	−15 (−26)	−12 (−24)	−5 (−21)	12 (−11)	28 (−2)	39 (4)	46 (8)	41 (5)	30 (−1)	21 (−6)	3 (−16)	−8 (−22)	−15 (−26)
Average precipitation inches (mm)	3.30 (84)	2.77 (70)	3.63 (92)	3.67 (93)	3.65 (93)	4.40 (112)	5.30 (135)	4.56 (116)	4.84 (123)	4.14 (105)	3.24 (82)	3.86 (98)	47.36 (1,203)
Average snowfall inches (cm)	9.8 (25)	10.8 (27)	6.3 (16)	0.5 (1.3)	0.0 (0.0)	0.0 (0.0)	0.0 (0.0)	0.0 (0.0)	0.0 (0.0)	0.2 (0.51)	0.9 (2.3)	4.6 (12)	33.1 (84)
Average extreme snow depth inches (cm)	6.4 (16)	7.9 (20)	4.9 (12)	0.3 (0.76)	0.0 (0.0)	0.0 (0.0)	0.0 (0.0)	0.0 (0.0)	0.0 (0.0)	0.2 (0.51)	0.6 (1.5)	2.9 (7.4)	12.4 (31)
Average precipitation days (≥ 0.01 in)	11.4	10.1	10.9	11.8	12.4	11.4	11.0	10.2	9.6	9.9	8.9	11.5	129.1
Average snowy days (≥ 0.1 in)	5.1	4.3	2.6	0.3	0.0	0.0	0.0	0.0	0.0	0.0	0.5	2.9	15.7
Average relative humidity (%)	70	66	62	61	66	68	70	72	74	72	70	71	69
Percentage possible sunshine	43	48	53	47	54	63	57	56	54	53	45	42	51
Source: NOAA (relative humidity 1981–2010)

== Demographics ==
Historical population
Census	Pop.	Note	%±
1790	486		—
1800	573		17.9%
1810	710		23.9%
1820	1,132		59.4%
1830	1,757		55.2%
1840	2,493		41.9%
1850	3,703		48.5%
1860	8,025		116.7%
1870	13,884		73.0%
1880	18,063		30.1%
1890	25,288		40.0%
1900	35,416		40.1%
1910	51,913		46.6%
1920	73,502		41.6%
1930	92,563		25.9%
1940	96,904		4.7%
1950	106,756		10.2%
1960	108,347		1.5%
1970	109,871		1.4%
1980	103,758		−5.6%
1990	105,090		1.3%
2000	106,632		1.5%
2010	118,032		10.7%
2020	125,845		6.6%
2025 (est.)	126,044		0.2%
U.S. Decennial Census

=== Racial and ethnic composition ===
Allentown city, Pennsylvania – Racial and ethnic composition Note: the US Census treats Hispanic/Latino as an ethnic category. This table excludes Latinos from the racial categories and assigns them to a separate category. Hispanics/Latinos may be of any race.
Race / Ethnicity (NH = Non-Hispanic)	Pop 1970	Pop 1980	Pop 1990	Pop 2000	Pop 2010	Pop 2020	% 1970	% 1980	% 1990	% 2000	% 2010	% 2020
White alone (NH)	107,247	94,508	86,510	68,621	50,964	38,033	97.92%	91.09%	82.32%	64.35%	43.18%	30.22%
Black or African American alone (NH)	1,980	3,047	4,639	7,284	11,336	13,193	1.81%	2.94%	4.41%	6.83%	9.60%	10.48%
Native American or Alaska Native alone (NH)	37	111	126	165	200	150	0.03%	0.11%	0.12%	0.15%	0.17%	0.12%
Asian alone (NH)	152	693	1,363	2,375	2,452	2,498	0.14%	0.67%	1.30%	2.23%	2.08%	1.98%
Native Hawaiian or Pacific Islander alone (NH)	152	693	1,363	49	11	28	0.14%	0.67%	1.30%	0.05%	0.01%	0.02%
Other race alone (NH)	111	105	178	136	224	805	0.10%	0.10%	0.17%	0.13%	0.19%	0.64%
Mixed race or Multiracial (NH)	N/A	N/A	N/A	1,944	2,384	2,906	N/A	N/A	N/A	1.82%	2.02%	2.31%
Hispanic or Latino (any race)	N/A	5,294	12,274	26,058	50,461	68,232	N/A	5.10%	11.68%	24.44%	42.75%	54.22%
Total	109,527	103,758	105,090	106,632	118,032	125,845	100.00%	100.00%	100.00%	100.00%	100.00%	100.00%

=== 2020 census ===
As of the 2020 census, Allentown had a population of 125,845, making it the third-most populous city in the state after Philadelphia and Pittsburgh. The median age was 34.2 years.

24.6% of residents were under the age of 18 and 13.4% were 65 years of age or older. For every 100 females there were 92.8 males, and for every 100 females age 18 and over there were 89.2 males age 18 and over.

100.0% of residents lived in urban areas, while 0.0% lived in rural areas.

There were 45,660 households in Allentown, of which 33.4% had children under the age of 18 living in them. Of all households, 32.5% were married-couple households, 21.6% were households with a male householder and no spouse or partner present, and 35.2% were households with a female householder and no spouse or partner present. About 29.7% of all households were made up of individuals and 11.1% had someone living alone who was 65 years of age or older.

There were 48,533 housing units, of which 5.9% were vacant. The homeowner vacancy rate was 1.4% and the rental vacancy rate was 4.8%.

Racial composition as of the 2020 census
Race	Number	Percent
White	48,176	38.3%
Black or African American	16,617	13.2%
American Indian and Alaska Native	962	0.8%
Asian	2,614	2.1%
Native Hawaiian and Other Pacific Islander	63	0.1%
Some other race	37,915	30.1%
Two or more races	19,498	15.5%

=== Crime ===
In 2020, according to the city, there were 4,283 Part 1 crimes, including homicides, non-fatal shootings, rapes, robberies, burglary, larcenies, motor vehicle thefts, and acts of arson. In 2020, reported non-fatal shootings, rapes, robberies, burglaries, and larcenies in the city fell compared to 2019. Motor vehicle thefts and arsons, however, increased. In 2020, there were nine homicides, unchanged from those in 2019.

On June 20, 2019, two rival gangs, the Bloods and Latin Kings, shot 10 people when the two gangs exchanged gunfire outside Deja Vu nightclub on Hamilton Street.

=== Hispanic population growth ===
The city's Hispanic population, consisting primarily of Dominicans and Puerto Ricans, has grown notably over the past three decades from an estimated 12 percent of the city's population in 1990 to an estimated 55 percent as of 2024.

=== 2010 census ===
As of the 2010 census, Allentown had 42,032 households, including 28.8% with children under age 18, 39.4% who were married couples living together, 15.1% who had a female householder with no husband present, and 40.2% who were non-families. Among all households as of 2010, 33.1% were made up of individuals and 12.8% had someone living alone who was 65 years of age or older. The city's average household size is 2.42 and average family size is 3.09.

As of 2010, Allentown's population broken down by age ranges was: 24.8% under 18, 11.2% from 18 to 24, 29.8% from 25 to 44, 19.1% from 45 to 64, and 15.1% 65 years or older. The median age was 34 years. For every 100 females, there were 91.8 males. For every 100 females age 18 and over, there were 87.7 males.

The median income for a household in the city was $52,449. Males had a median income of $30,426 versus $23,882 for females. Per capita income in Allentown, as of 2010, was $16,282 with 18.5% of the total city population and 14.6% of families in the city below the poverty line. As of 2010, city residents living beneath the poverty line included 29.4% of those under age 18 and 10% of those over age 65. As of February 2010, the unemployment rate for the larger Lehigh Valley metropolitan area was 9.8%, and Allentown's unemployment rate was slightly higher at over 10%.

=== 2000 census ===
As of 2000, the city's population density was 6,011.5 inhabitants per square mile (2,321.1/km^{2}), and there were 45,960 housing units at an average density of 2,591.1 per square mile (1,000.4/km^{2}).

== Economy ==
Allentown historically was a hub for the nation's earliest industrialization, and its economy was heavily manufacturing-based. Beginning in the late 20th century, the city evolved into a more service-oriented economy, due largely to Rust Belt decline in heavy industry, which began around 1980 and accelerated through the 20th century's last two decades. Allentown is corporate headquarters for several large companies, including Air Products, PPL Corporation, and others. The city's largest employer, as of 2007, is Lehigh Valley Health Network with over 7,800 employees. Lehigh Valley Health Network's flagship hospital, Lehigh Valley Hospital–Cedar Crest, is Pennsylvania's third-largest hospital with 877 licensed beds and 46 operating rooms.

Center City, located largely on Hamilton Street between 5th and 10th streets, was the primary shopping district in Allentown for most of the 20th century. During the 1960s and 1970s, however, several shopping malls, including South Mall in Salisbury Township and Lehigh Valley Mall and Whitehall Mall, both in Whitehall Township, were built in Allentown's suburbs and now represent the most popular shopping destinations. In October 2006, Promenade Saucon Valley opened south of Allentown in Upper Saucon Township.

== Culture ==
=== Arts and theater ===
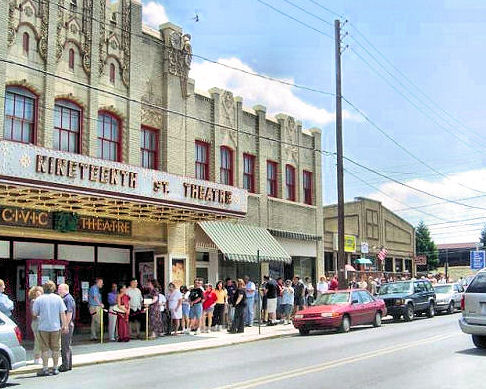
Civic Theatre of Allentown, which opened on 19th Street in 1928, is the city's oldest cinema.

Allentown Symphony Orchestra performs at Miller Symphony Hall, located on N. 6th Street in Center City. The city has a musical heritage of civilian concert bands and is home to Allentown Band, the nation's oldest civilian concert band, founded in 1828. Allentown houses a collection of public sculptures, including the DaVinci Horse, located on 5th Street, which is one of only three da Vinci sculptures in the world. Allentown Art Museum, located on N. 5th Street in Center City, is home to a collection of over 13,000 pieces of art and an associated library. Baum School of Art at 5th and Linden streets offers credit and non-credit classes in painting, drawing, ceramics, fashion design, jewelry making, and other arts-related curriculum.

Civic Theatre of Allentown, founded in 1928, has an 90-plus year history of producing theater in the Lehigh Valley. Initially named Civic Little Theater, Civic Theatre of Allentown today has paid professional staff, a volunteer board of directors from the community, and volunteer staff. The theater operates the Lehigh Valley's only full-time cinema, showing art, independent and foreign films, and offers a theater school that has served the Valley's youth for over 50 years. The theatre is professionally directed and managed and utilizes community actors in its live theater productions.

=== Museums and cultural organizations ===
- Allentown Art Museum, art museum
- Allentown Band, nation's oldest civilian concert band
- Allentown Symphony Orchestra, symphony orchestra
- America on Wheels, automotive transportation museum
- Baum School of Art, non-profit community art school
- Civic Theatre of Allentown, historic cinema
- Da Vinci Science Center, science museum
- Lehigh County Historical Society, local historical society and museum
- Marine Band of Allentown, civilian concert band
- Municipal Band of Allentown, civilian concert band
- Museum of Indian Culture, Lenape Indian educational center

=== Cuisine ===
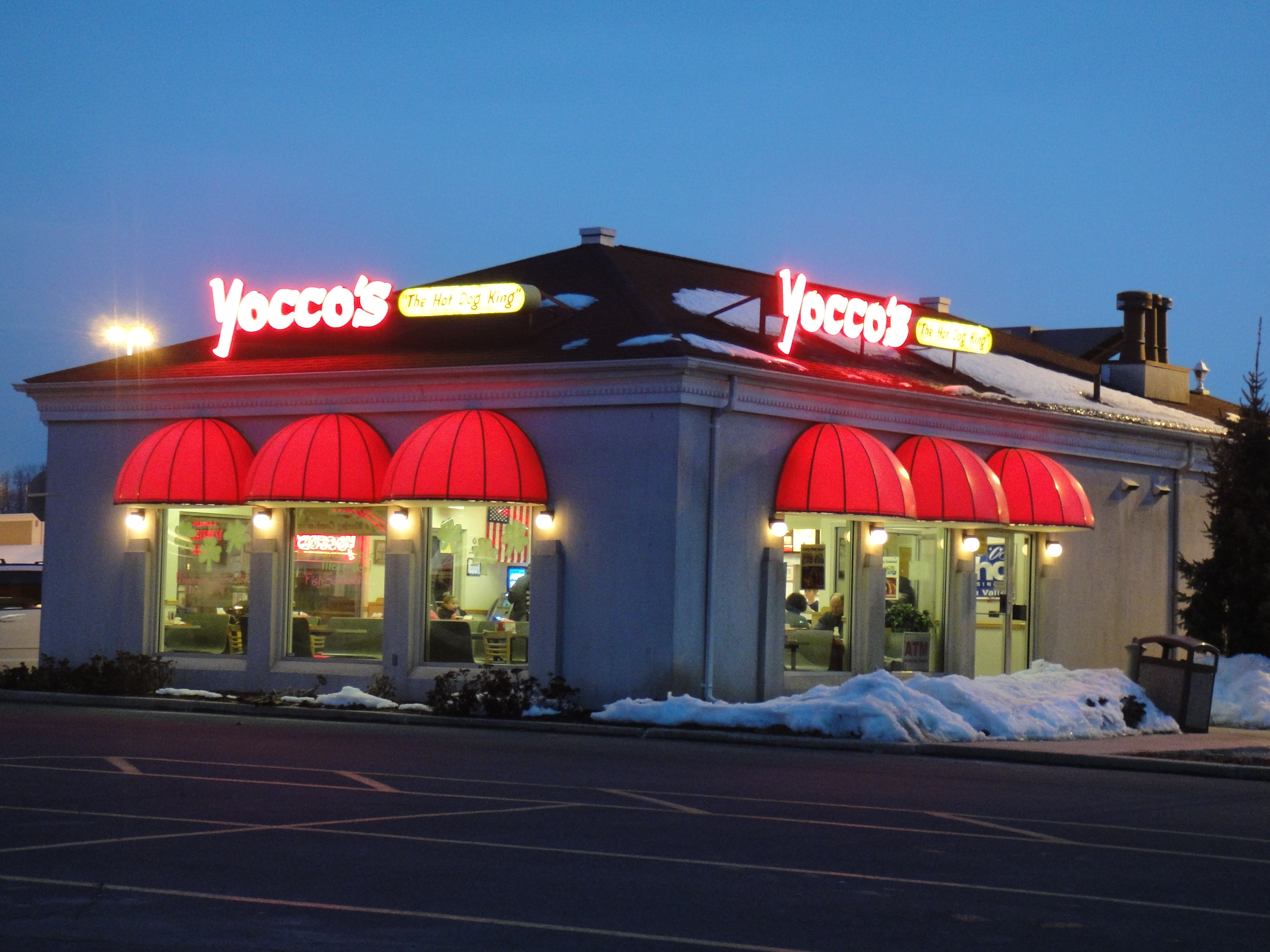
Yocco's Hot Dogs, founded in 1922 by Lee Iacocca's uncle Theodore Iacocca, maintains five popular locations in Allentown and its suburbs.

Vestiges of Allentown's Pennsylvania Dutch heritage are prominent in Pennsylvania Dutch cuisine in the city. Foodstuffs, including scrapple, chow-chow, Lebanon bologna, cole slaw, and apple butter, are often found in local diners and the Allentown Farmer's Market. Shoofly pie, birch beer, and funnel cakes are regularly available at local fairs. Several local churches make and sell fastnachts in fundraisers for Fastnacht Day, the day before Lent's commencement.

Due in part to Allentown's proximity to Philadelphia, cheesesteaks are immensely popular. Yocco's Hot Dogs, a regionally well-known hot dog and cheesesteak establishment with five area locations, three of which are in Allentown, was founded in 1922 by Theodore Iacocca, uncle of former Chrysler chairman and president Lee Iacocca. A-Treat Bottling Company, a regionally-popular soft drink beverage company, has been based in Allentown since its 1918 founding.

=== Landmarks ===
Soldiers and Sailors monument, dedicated and unveiled on October 19, 1899, on Allentown's Center Square at 7th and Hamilton streets, honors Union army volunteers from Allentown and the Lehigh Valley metropolitan area who were killed during the American Civil War. The monument is topped by a statue representing the Goddess of Liberty. In 1957, the statue atop the monument, then in a state of disrepair, was removed; it was replaced in 1964. Allentown's motto is Sic semper tyrannis, which, translated from Latin, means "thus always to tyrants", suggesting that bad but justified outcomes will ultimately befall tyrants.

=== Music ===
Allentown Band, Marine Band of Allentown, Municipal Band of Allentown, and Pioneer Band of Allentown all perform regularly at the bandshell in the city's West Park. Allentown's J. Birney Crum Stadium, the largest high school football field in the Mid-Atlantic U.S and 15th-largest in the nation, hosts Drum Corps International's Eastern Classic, which annually brings together the world's top junior drum and bugle corps for a two-day event. Allentown is home to a full symphony orchestra, Allentown Symphony Orchestra, which performs at Miller Symphony Hall at 23 N. 6th Street.

== Parks and recreation ==
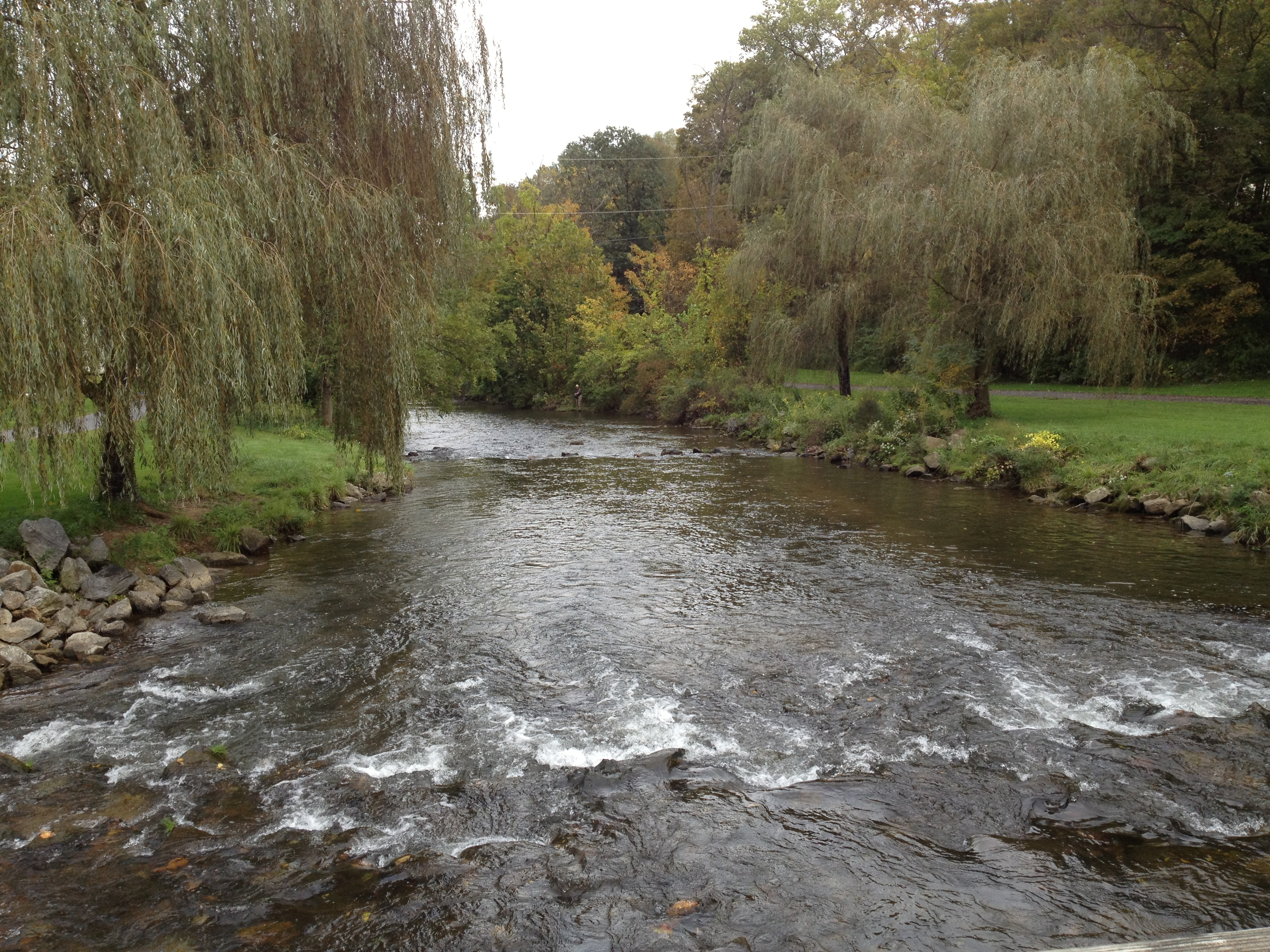
Little Lehigh Creek in Lehigh Parkway in September 2012

Much of Allentown's park system is a product of industrialist Harry Clay Trexler's efforts. Inspired by the City Beautiful movement in the early 20th century, Trexler helped create West Park, a 6.59-acre (26,700 m^{2}) park in what was then a community trash pit and sandlot baseball field in an upscale area of the city. The park, which opened in 1909, features a bandshell designed by Philadelphia architect Horace Trumbauer and has long been home to the Allentown Band and other community bands. Trexler also facilitated the development of Trexler Park, Cedar Parkway, Allentown Municipal Golf Course, and Trout Nursery in Lehigh Parkway and was responsible for the development of the Trexler Trust, which provides ongoing private funding for Allentown's park system's maintenance and development.

Allentown's parks include Bicentennial Park, a 4,600 seat mini-stadium built for sporting events, the 127-acre Cedar Creek Parkway, which includes Lake Muhlenberg, Cedar Beach, and Malcolm W. Gross Memorial Rose Garden, East Side Reservoir (15 acres), Irving Street Park, Kimmets Lock Park (5 acres), Lehigh Canal Park (55 acres), Lehigh Parkway (999 acres), Old Allentown Cemetery (4 acres), Jordan Park, South Mountain Reservoir (157 acres), Trexler Park (134 acres), Trout Creek Parkway (100 acres), Joe Daddona Park (19 acres), Keck Park, Percy Ruhe Park, also known as Alton Park, and West Park (6.59 acres).

=== Amusement park ===
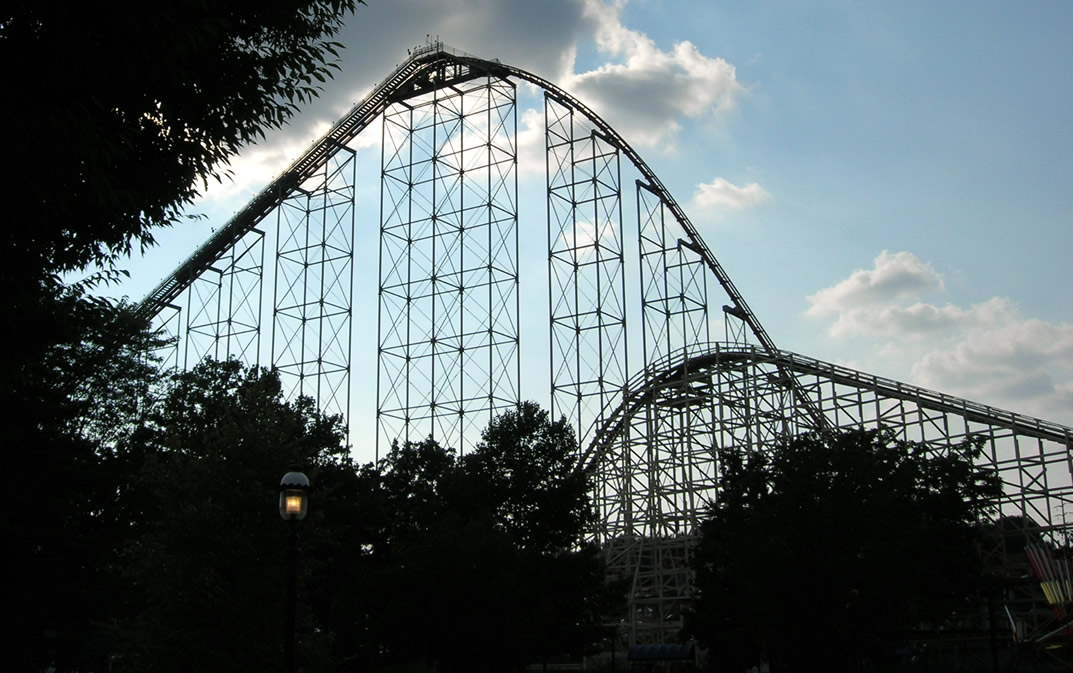
Steel Force (left) and Thunderhawk (right), two roller coasters at Dorney Park & Wildwater Kingdom in Allentown, the nation's fifth-longest continuously operating amusement park. At 5,600 feet (1,700 m) in length, Steel Force is the eighth-longest steel roller coaster in the world; it has a first drop of 205 feet (62 m) and a top speed of 75 miles per hour (121 km/h).

Allentown is home to Dorney Park & Wildwater Kingdom, the nation's fifth-longest continuously operating amusement park, and one of the largest amusement and water parks in the United States. Dorney Park's Steel Force roller coaster is the eighth-longest steel rollercoaster in the world.

=== Festivals ===
The Great Allentown Fair runs annually the end of August and early September on the grounds of the Allentown Fairgrounds on N. 17th Street, where it has been held continuously since 1889. The first Allentown Fair was held in 1852. Prior to moving to the Allentown Fairgrounds in 1889, it was held at the Old Allentown Fairgrounds north of Liberty Street between 5th and 6th streets.

Blues, Brews, and Barbeque, a blues festival launched in 2014, is held annually in June on Hamilton Street in Center City. Annually in May, Mayfair Festival of the Arts, a three-day arts festival, is held on Cedar Crest College campus in Allentown.

== Sports ==
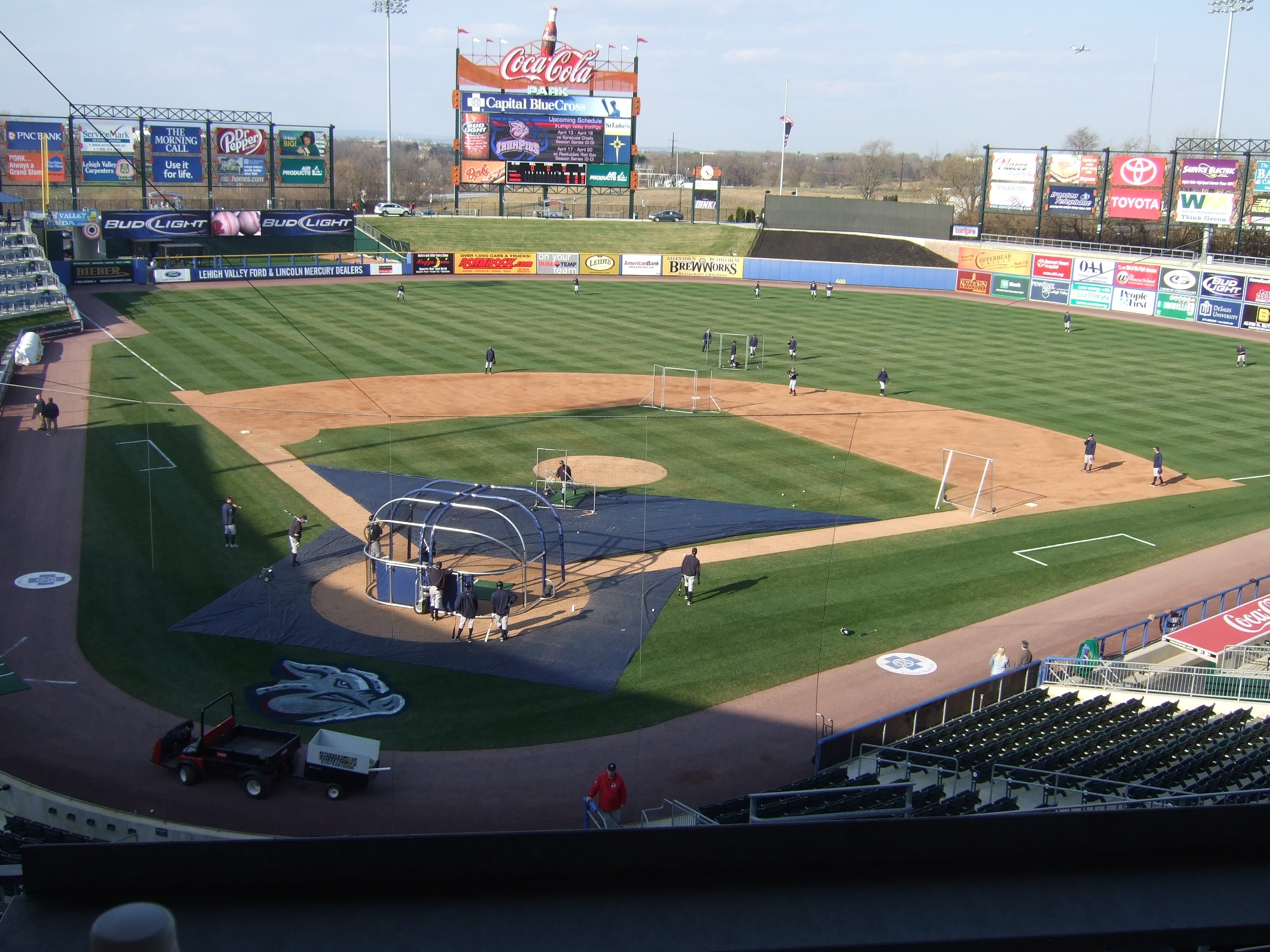
Coca-Cola Park, home field of the Lehigh Valley IronPigs, the Triple-A affiliate of the Philadelphia Phillies of Major League Baseball, in April 2009

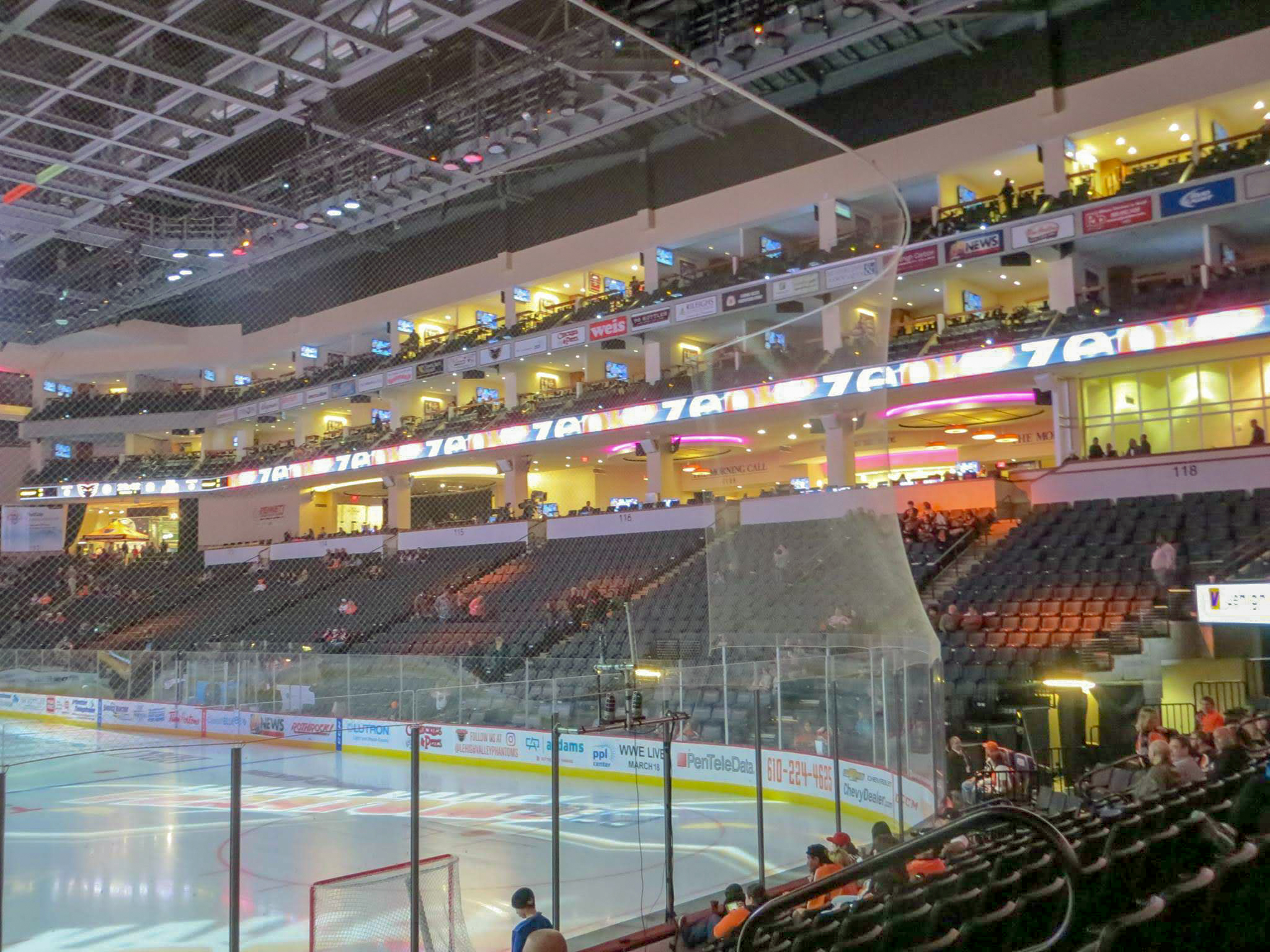
PPL Center in Center City, the home arena for the Lehigh Valley Phantoms of the American Hockey League, in February 2017

=== Collegiate athletics ===
Both Cedar Crest College and Muhlenberg College in Allentown have collegiate athletic programs in most sports. The Muhlenberg Mules play their home football games at Scotty Wood Stadium on the Muhlenberg campus in Allentown.

=== High school athletics ===
Allentown and its surrounding Lehigh Valley region are known for high quality high school-level athletics, and the region has been the starting ground for a considerable number of professional and Olympic-level athletes.

Allentown's three large high schools, Allen, Dieruff, and Central Catholic, each compete in the Eastern Pennsylvania Conference, one of the nation's premier high school athletic divisions. All three Allentown high schools play their home football games at the 15,000 capacity J. Birney Crum Stadium at 2027 Linden Street, the largest high school football stadium in the Mid-Atlantic region of the nation.

=== Lehigh Valley IronPigs baseball ===
Professional baseball has a rich history in Allentown dating back to 1884. The city is home to the Lehigh Valley IronPigs, the Triple-A Minor League affiliate of the Philadelphia Phillies who play at Coca-Cola Park, a $50.25 million, 8,200-seat stadium on Allentown's east-side.

=== Lehigh Valley Phantoms ice hockey ===
Allentown is home to the Lehigh Valley Phantoms, the primary development team of the Philadelphia Flyers, which compete in the American Hockey League and play at PPL Center, an 8,500-seat indoor arena in Center City.

=== Lehigh Valley Spirits indoor soccer ===
Allentown is home to the Lehigh Valley Spirits, who will compete in the Major Arena Soccer League. The team will play their home games at the PPL Center. The team is scheduled to play their first game in fall 2026.

=== Parkettes gymnastics ===
Allentown is home to the Parkettes National Gymnastics Training Center, which has been the training ground for several Olympians and U.S. national gymnastics champions. In 2003, the program was the subject of an immensely critical CNN documentary, Achieving the Perfect 10, which depicted it as a hugely demanding and competitive gymnastics training center.

=== Historical teams ===
Allentown hosted the Allentown Jets, a Continental Basketball Association team that played in Rockne Hall at Allentown Central Catholic High School from 1958 to 1981. The Jets were one of the most dominant franchises in the league's history, winning eight playoff championships and twelve division titles. Allentown has been home to two professional soccer teams, the Pennsylvania Stoners (2007–2009) and Northampton Laurels (2005–2008) of the now defunct Women's Premier Soccer League. The Pennsylvania ValleyDawgs of the now defunct U.S. Basketball League played their home games at William Allen High School during the league's existence from 1999 to 2006.

== Government ==
View of city hall building in Allentown, Pennsylvania, 1965

Allentown is legally classified as a Pennsylvania third-class city and has operated with the strong-mayor version of the mayor-council form of government since 1970. The mayor serves as the city's chief executive and administrative officer, and Allentown City Council serves as the legislative branch. Elected at-large, the mayor serves a four-year term under the city's home rule charter. The current city mayor is Matthew Tuerk, a Democrat. Allentown City Council has seven council members who are elected at large for four-year staggered terms. The city council holds regular public meetings and enacts city legislation, including ordinances and resolutions. Allentown City Council's current president is Daryl Hendricks. The city controller, who is responsible for oversight of the city's finances, is elected and serves a four-year term.

On the federal level, Allentown is part of Pennsylvania's 7th congressional district in the U.S. House Representatives, represented since January 2025 by Republican Ryan Mackenzie. In the U.S. Senate, the city and state are represented by Democrat John Fetterman and Republican Dave McCormick. Since January 2023, Pennsylvania's governor is Democrat Josh Shapiro.

United States presidential election results for Allentown, Pennsylvania
Year	Republican		Democratic		Third party(ies)	
Year	No.	%	No.	%	No.	%
2024	16,066	38.03%	25,761	60.97%	424	1.00%
2020	13,479	31.90%	28,338	67.06%	443	1.05%
2016	11,013	27.54%	27,783	69.47%	1,196	2.99%
2012	10,077	27.25%	26,508	71.67%	400	1.08%
2008	10,761	26.79%	28,895	71.93%	514	1.28%
2004	14,131	36.96%	23,882	62.46%	221	0.58%

== Education ==
=== Primary and secondary education ===
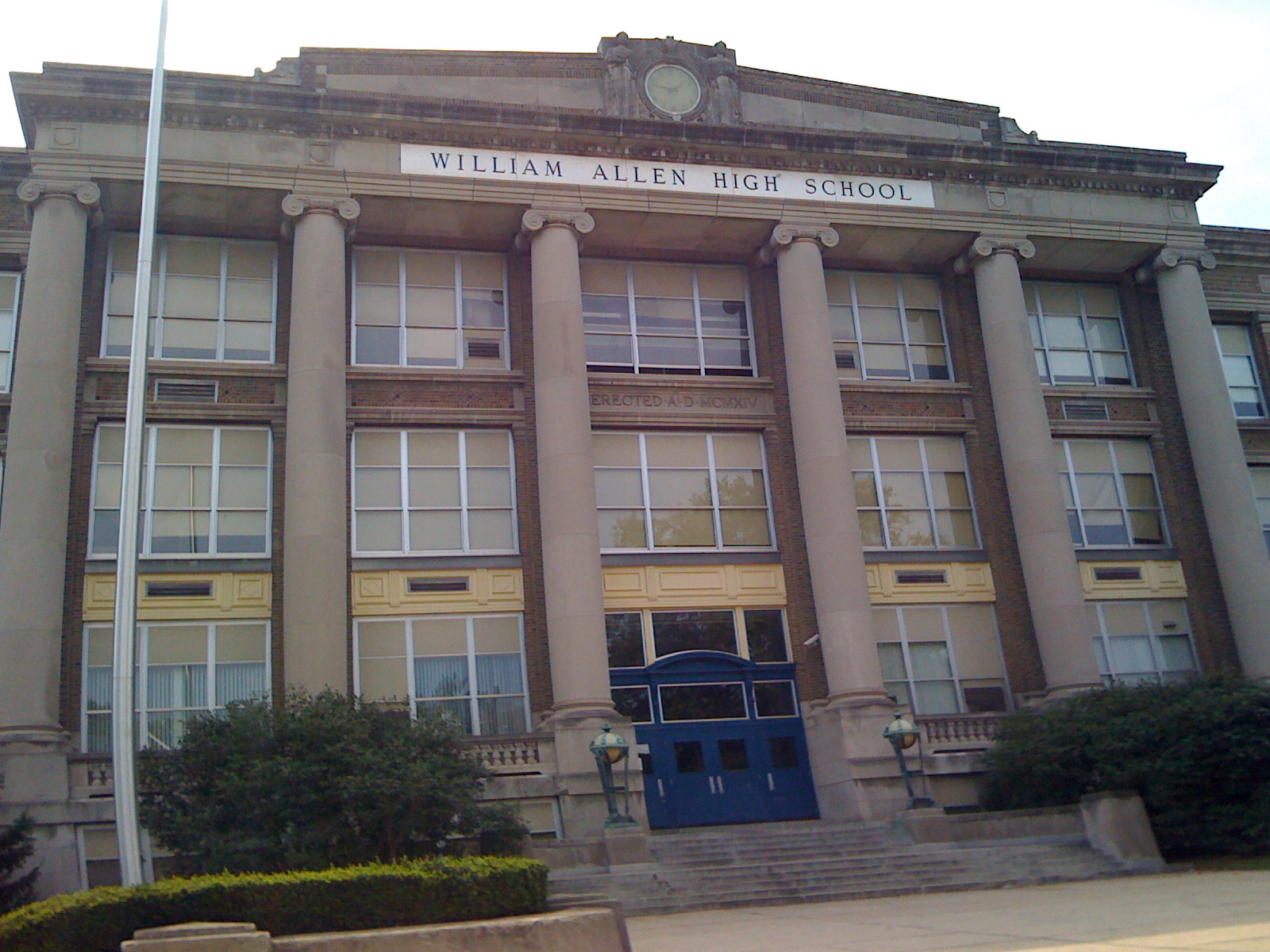
Allen High School at 106 N. 17th Street, one of the city's two large public high schools

Allentown School District, founded in 1828, is Pennsylvania's fourth-largest school district as of 2025. The district covers the majority of the city limits with the exception of a small portion near Trexler Park; which is covered by the Parkland School District. As of the 2023-24 school year, Allentown School District had 16,510 students and 1,050 teachers for a student-teacher ratio of 15.72 on a full-time equivalent basis, and an annual school district budget of $414.939 million, according to National Center for Education Statistics data.

The Allentown district school has two large public high schools for ninth through 12th grades, William Allen High School, which serves students from Allentown's southern and western sections, and Louis E. Dieruff High School, which serves students from the eastern and northern parts. Each of the city's high schools competes athletically in the Eastern Pennsylvania Conference, an elite high school athletic conference, which includes the 18 largest high schools in the Lehigh Valley and Pocono Mountain regions of the state. Both schools and Allentown Central Catholic High School, the city's parochial high school, play their home football games at J. Birney Crum Stadium, a 15,000 capacity stadium, which is the largest high school stadium in the state and among the largest in the nation.

Allentown School District's four middle schools, for grades 6–8, are: Francis D. Raub Middle School, Harrison-Morton Middle School, South Mountain Middle School, and Trexler Middle School. The city district has 16 elementary schools for kindergarten through fifth grade: Central, Cleveland, Hiram W. Dodd, Jefferson, Lehigh Parkway, Lincoln, Luis A. Ramos, McKinley, Midway Manor, Mosser, Muhlenberg, Ritter, Roosevelt, Sheridan, Union Terrace, and Washington.

Allentown also has two public charter schools, Roberto Clemente Charter School, located at 4th and Walnut streets in Allentown, which is a Title I charter school that provides educational services to mainly Hispanic students in grades 6 through 12, and Lincoln Leadership Academy Charter School, located at 1414 E. Cedar Street, which serves students K to 12 students.

Other Allentown-based parochial schools serving K to 8 students include Saint John Vianney Regional School, Holy Spirit School, Lehigh Christian Academy, Mercy Special Learning Center, Our Lady Help of Christians School, Sacred Heart School, and Saint Thomas More School. Roman Catholic-affiliated parochial schools in Allentown are operated by the Roman Catholic Diocese of Allentown. Grace Montessori School is a pre-school and early elementary Montessori school run as an outreach of Grace Episcopal Church. Allentown has one private Jewish school, Jewish Day School, and two independent day schools, Salvaggio Academy, an independent day school, and The Swain School, which is associated with Moravian Academy. Newcomer Academy at Midway Manor and Allentown School District Virtual Academy are parochial schools serving grades 8 to 12.

=== Colleges and universities ===
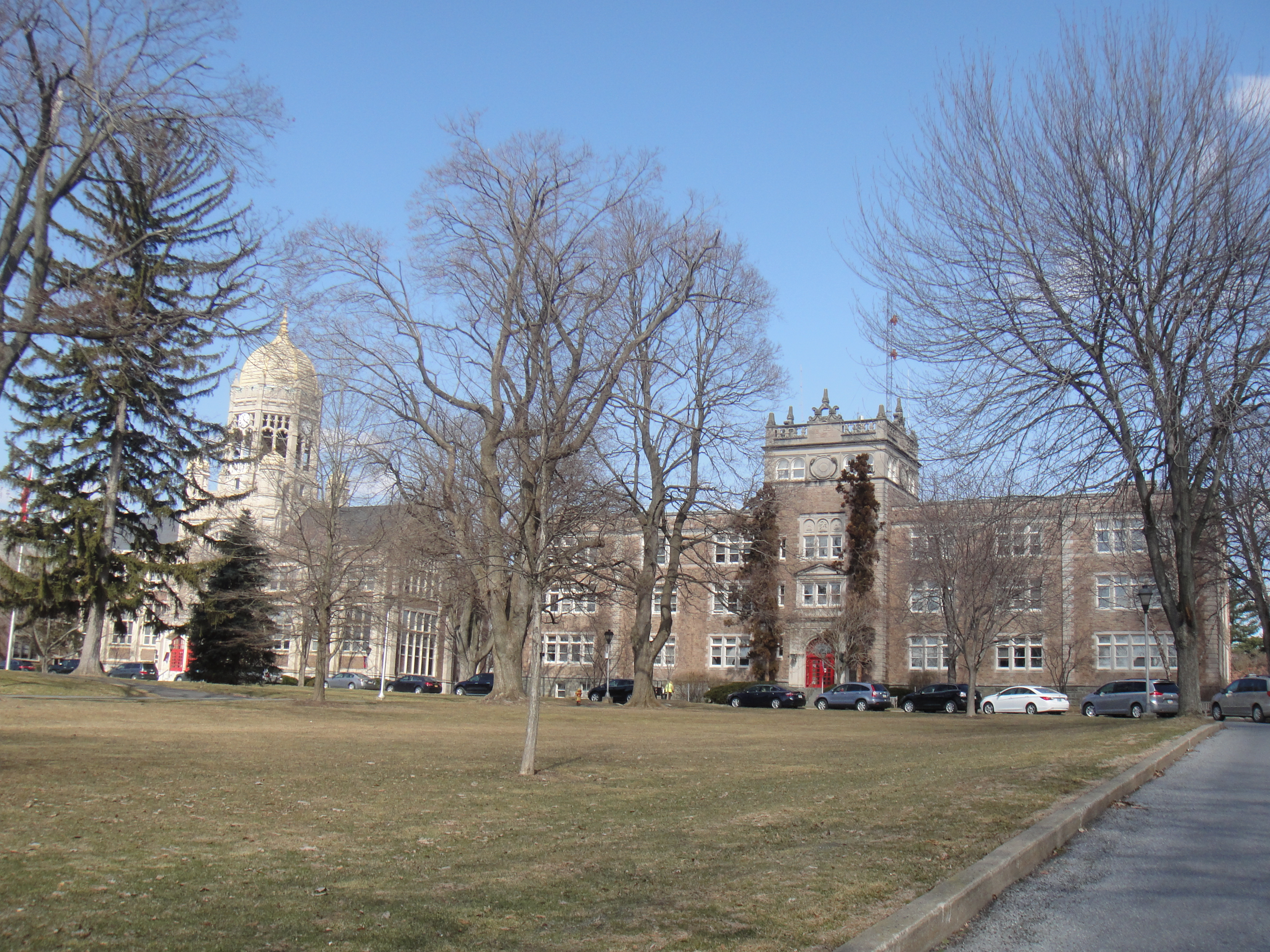
The campus of Muhlenberg College at 2400 Chew Street, in March 2014

Two four-year colleges, Cedar Crest College and Muhlenberg College, are based in Allentown. The city is also home to a satellite campus of Lehigh Carbon Community College (LCCC), a comprehensive community college that offers two-year and four-year degree programs, continuing education, and industry training whose main campus is in Schnecksville.

=== Libraries ===
Allentown also has a public library.

== Media ==
=== Television ===
Allentown is part of the Philadelphia media market, the fourth-largest television market in the nation. Major Philadelphia-based network stations serving Allentown include KYW-TV Channel 3 (CBS), WCAU Channel 10 (NBC), WPVI Channel 6 (ABC), and WTXF Channel 29 (Fox). Two television stations are located in Allentown: WFMZ-TV Channel 69, based in Allentown with studios and a transmitting site atop South Mountain, is an independent station, and WLVT-TV Channel 39, the regional PBS affiliate, is licensed to Allentown with studios in neighboring Bethlehem.

=== Radio ===
Nielsen Audio ranks Allentown the nation's 74th-largest radio market as of 2022. Stations licensed to Allentown include WAEB-AM (talk, news, and sports), WAEB-FM (contemporary hits), WDIY (NPR public radio), WHOL (rhythmic contemporary), WLEV (adult contemporary), WMUH (Muhlenberg College freeform campus radio), WSAN (oldies and Philadelphia Phillies broadcasts), WZZO (classic rock), and others. In addition, many stations from New York City, the nation's largest radio market, and Philadelphia, the nation's fourth-largest radio market, are received in Allentown.

=== Newspapers and magazines ===
Allentown has two daily newspapers, The Morning Call and The Express-Times. The Times News, based in Lehighton, also covers the city. Several weekly and monthly print publications are based in Allentown or cover the city's news and people.

== Infrastructure ==
=== Transportation ===
==== Airports ====
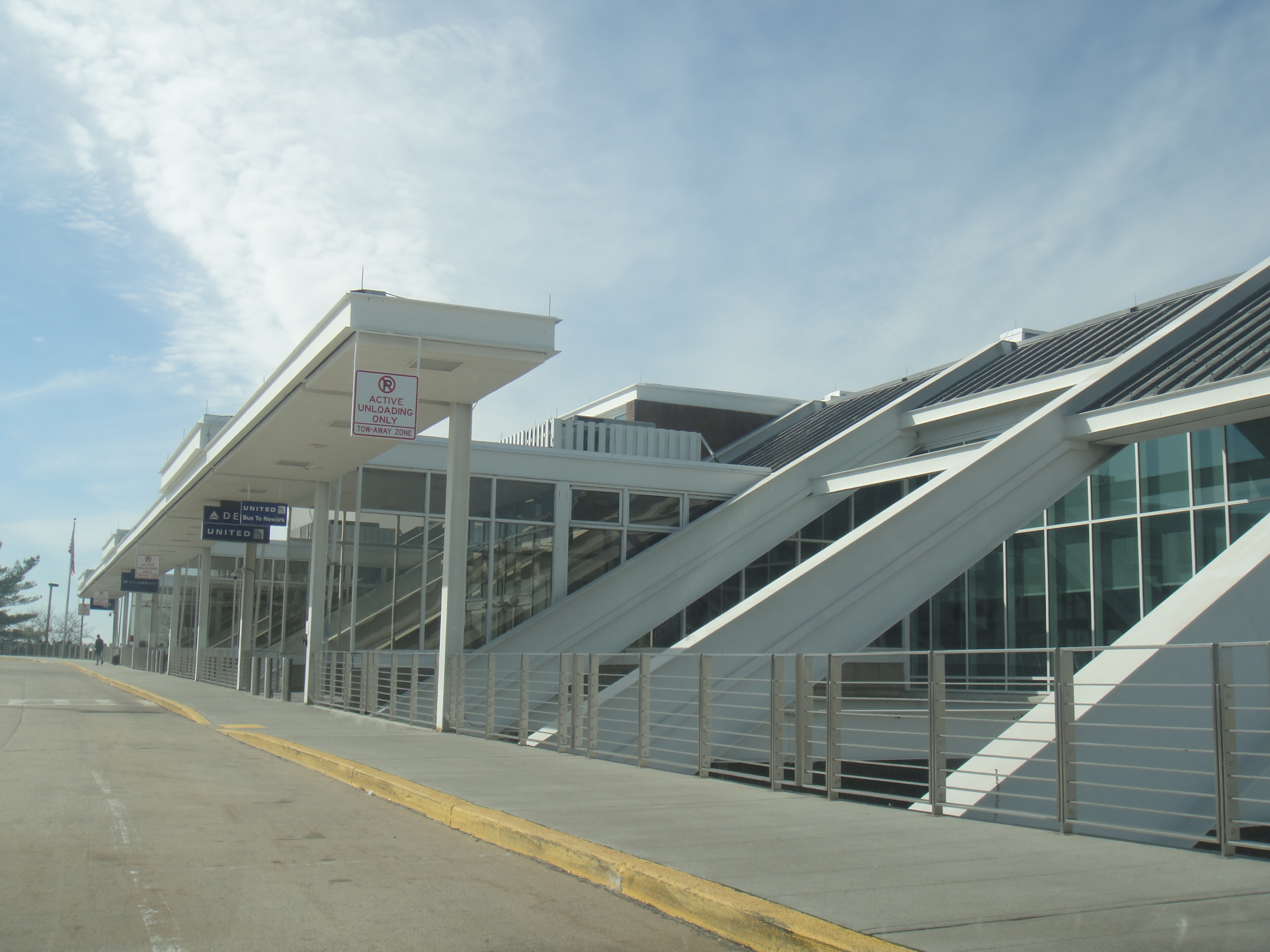
Lehigh Valley International Airport, the state's fourth-busiest airport, located 3 miles (4.8 km) northeast of Allentown in Hanover Township

The city's primary commercial airport, Lehigh Valley International Airport, is located 3 miles (4.8 km) northeast of Allentown in Hanover Township and is operated by Lehigh–Northampton Airport Authority. The airport has direct flights to Atlanta, Charlotte, Chicago–O'Hare, Detroit, Philadelphia, and several cities in Florida. The region is also served by Allentown Queen City Municipal Airport, a two-runway facility located on Lehigh Street in South Allentown used predominantly by private aircraft.

==== Roads ====
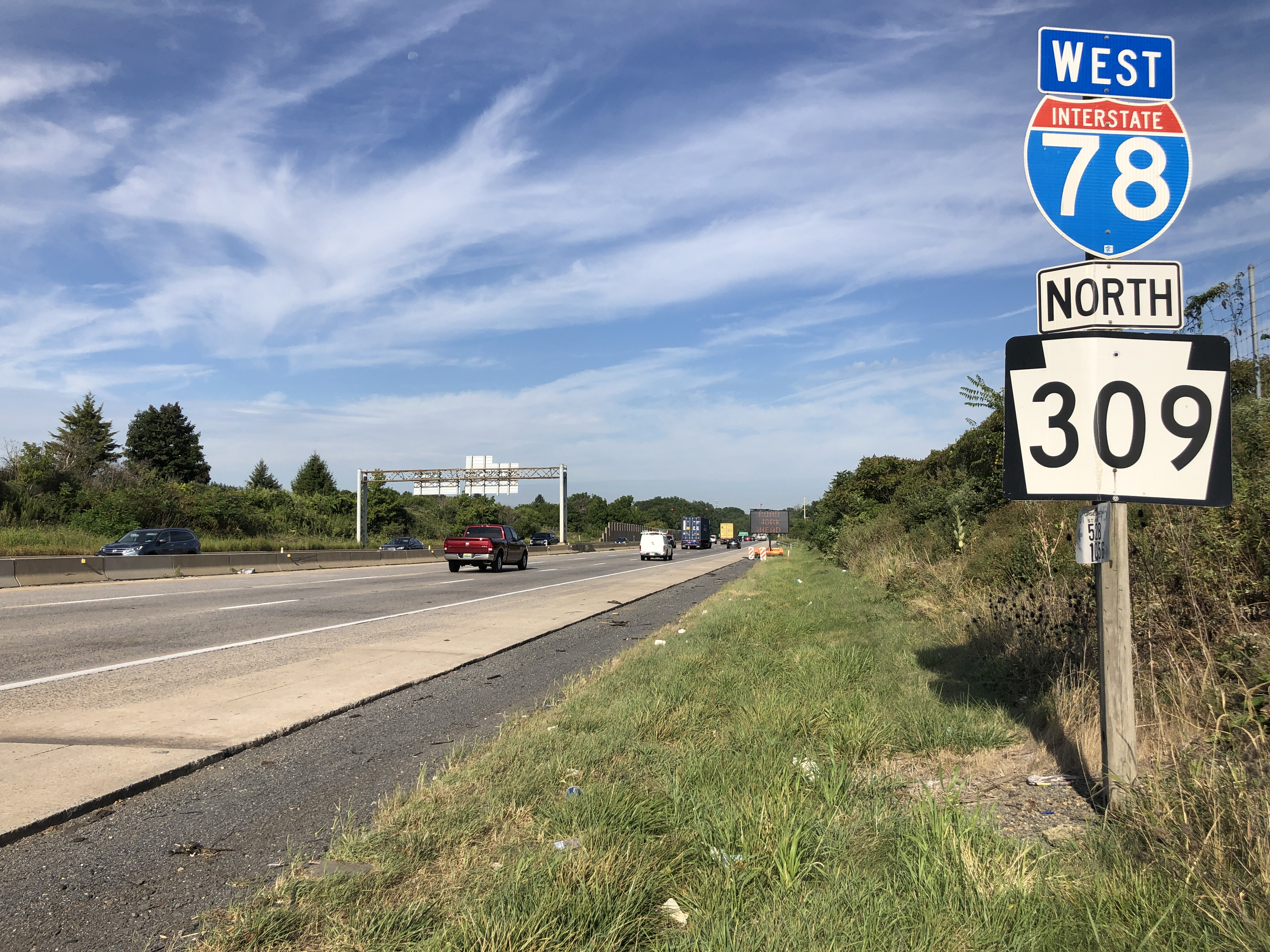
I-78 West and PA Route 309 North in August 2022

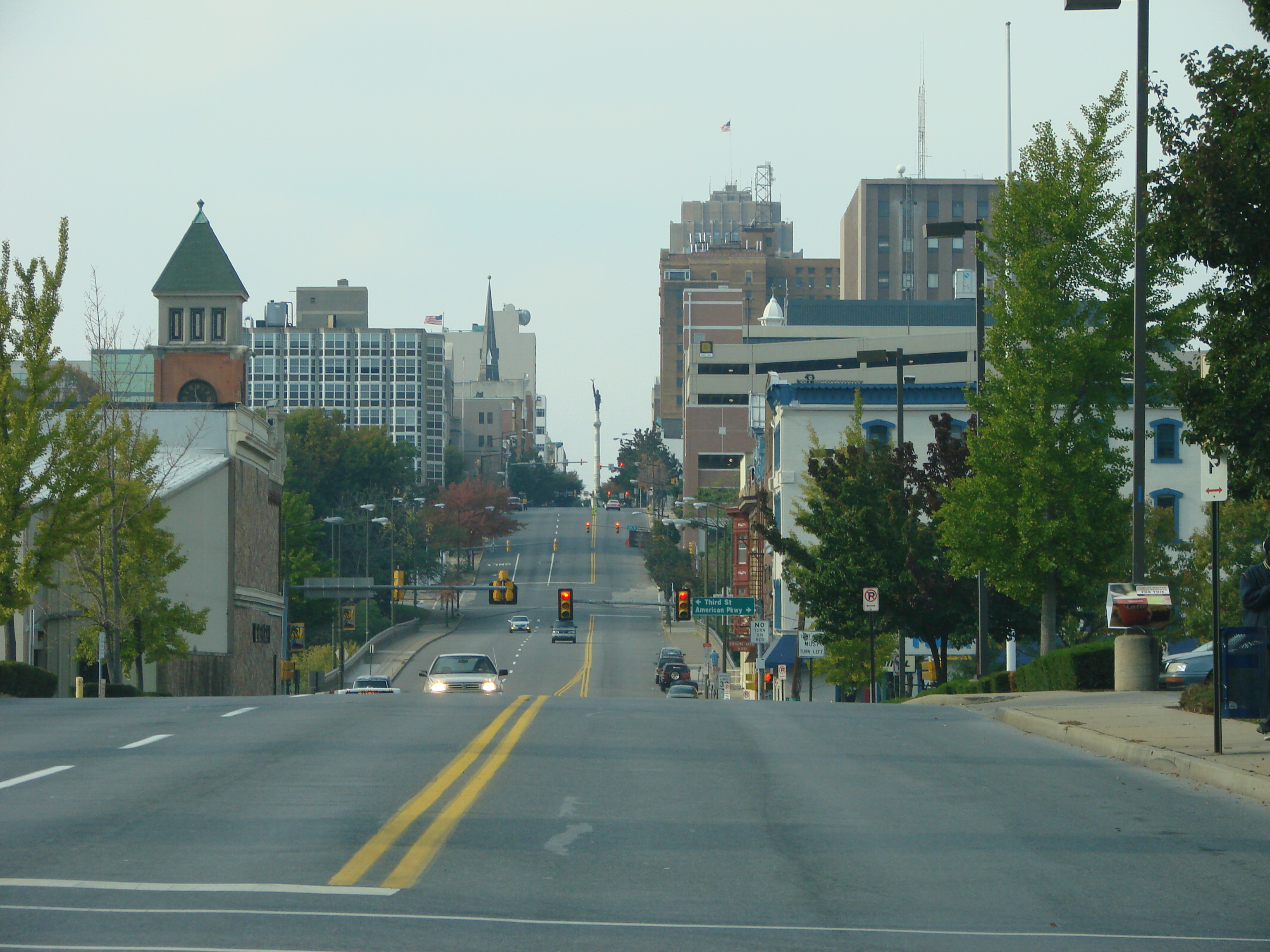
Hamilton Street in Center City in November 2007

There are 314.10 miles (505.49 km) of public roads in Allentown, 26.16 miles (42.10 km) of which are maintained by the Pennsylvania Department of Transportation (PennDOT) and 287.94 miles (463.39 km) that are maintained by the city as of 2022.

The most prominent highway passing through Allentown is I-78, which runs concurrently with PA 309 along an east–west alignment across the southern portion of the city. I-78 runs from Lebanon County in the west to the Holland Tunnel and Lower Manhattan in the east, while PA 309 runs from Philadelphia in the south to the Wyoming Valley in the north. US 22 briefly passes through the northwestern corner of the city as it follows the Lehigh Valley Thruway along an east–west alignment; it runs from Cincinnati in the west to Newark in the east.

There are nine major inbound roads to Center City: Airport Road, Cedar Crest Boulevard, Fullerton Avenue, Hamilton Boulevard, Lehigh Street, Mauch Chunk Road, MacArthur Road, Tilghman Street, and Union Boulevard. I-476, the Northeast Extension of the Pennsylvania Turnpike, passes to the west of the Allentown city limits. It runs from Plymouth Meeting outside Philadelphia in the south to I-81 at Clarks Summit in the north.

==== Buses ====
Public buses in Allentown are provided by LANta, a bus system serving Lehigh and Northampton counties. Allentown Transportation Center, located on N. 7th Street, serves as a major hub for LANTA buses.

Multiple private bus lines serve Allentown at the intercity terminal at 325 Hamilton Street, including Trans-Bridge Lines and Greyhound Lines, offering direct bus service throughout the day to Port Authority Bus Terminal in Manhattan and intermediate points, and Fullington Trailways, which offers direct service to Williamsport, Hazleton, Philadelphia, and intermediate points. Martz Trailways stops in Allentown as part of its route between Scranton/Wilkes-Barre and Philadelphia and its commuter routes to New York City, which are part of the Amtrak Thruway that connects Amtrak trains at 30th Street Station in Philadelphia with the Lehigh Valley and Northeastern Pennsylvania. Uptown Vans offers service to Newark, New Jersey, Union City, New Jersey, and New York City Public parking in the city is managed by the Allentown Parking Authority.

==== Rail ====
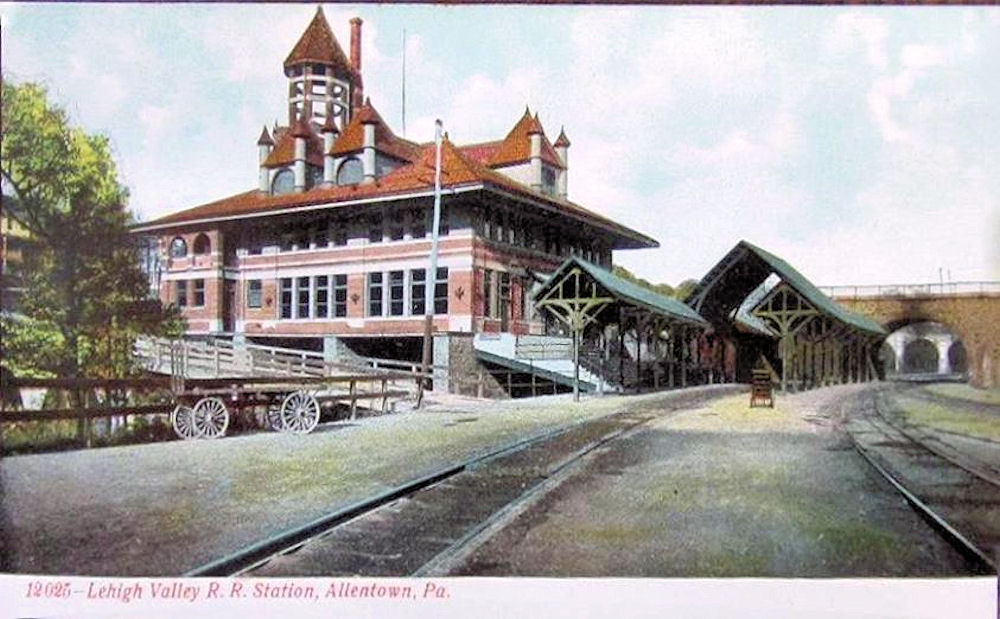
A 1915 postcard of Allentown station at 4th and Hamilton streets, which opened in 1890, closed in 1961, and was demolished in 1972

Allentown is a regional center for freight transport. Norfolk Southern Railway's primary Northeast hump classification yards are located in Allentown, and the city is served by R.J. Corman Railroad Group, a commercial railroad company. Major commercial rail traffic in the city include the Norfolk Southern Lehigh Line, which runs east through the city across the Delaware River, and Norfolk Southern's Reading Line, which runs west through Allentown to Reading.

The last passenger rail service in the city, which was provided by SEPTA, ceased operating in 1979, though one of SEPTA's two main Allentown train stations remains standing. In September 2020, Amtrak, as part of its expansion plan, proposed restoring rail service between Allentown and New York City by 2035. This largely single-track Amtrak route has been opposed by Norfolk Southern Railway, which acquired the Lehigh Line as part of its purchase of federally-founded Conrail in 1999. In November 2008, the Lehigh Valley Economic Development Corporation (LVEDC) and both Lehigh and Northampton counties commissioned a study, exploring restoration of the Black Diamond service, which ran until 1961, which would entail extending New Jersey Transit's Raritan Valley Line to Allentown.

Allentown was once a passenger rail hub served by the Central Railroad of New Jersey, using the Lehigh and Susquehanna Railroad, Lehigh and New England Railroad, Lehigh Valley Railroad, Reading Railroad, Lehigh Valley Transit Company, and Conrail. Routes served Wilkes-Barre and Scranton to the north, Buffalo and Williamsport to the northwest, Reading and Harrisburg to the west, Jersey City and New York City to the east, and Philadelphia to the south.

=== Utilities ===
Electricity in Allentown is provided by PPL Corporation, which is headquartered in Allentown. UGI Corporation, headquartered in King of Prussia, supplies natural gas. Two cable companies, RCN Corporation, based in Princeton, New Jersey, and Service Electric, based in Bethlehem, have provided cable service to Allentown since the 1960s. The area's only landfill, Waste Connections of Canada, is locally headquartered in Bethlehem. Water and sewage, prior to 2013, were controlled by the city and are now managed by Lehigh County, following the end of a 50-year lease agreement. Waste, recycling, and yard waste are each administered by the city.

=== Health care ===
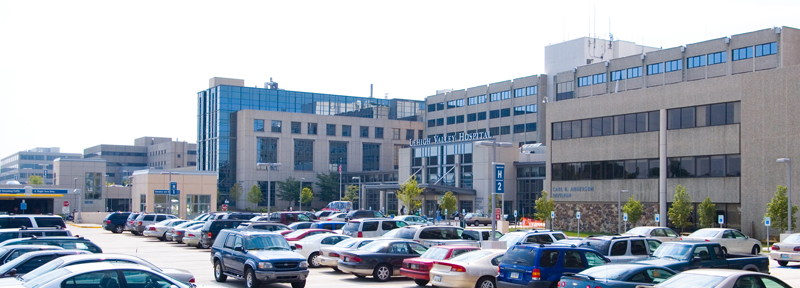
Lehigh Valley Hospital–Cedar Crest on Cedar Crest Boulevard, the largest hospital in the Lehigh Valley and third-largest hospital in Pennsylvania with 877 beds and 46 operating rooms

Lehigh Valley Hospital–Cedar Crest, located on Cedar Crest Boulevard and part of Lehigh Valley Health Network, is Allentown and the Lehigh Valley's largest hospital and the third-largest hospital in Pennsylvania with 877 beds and 46 operating rooms. It is also a Level 1 trauma center. St. Luke's University Health Network, Sacred Heart Hospital, and Good Shepherd Rehabilitation also provide hospital and rehabilitation services. In 2010, Allentown State Hospital, a psychiatric hospital in Allentown, was closed as part of a statewide closing of psychiatric hospitals by the Pennsylvania Department of Human Services.

=== Fire department ===
The Allentown Fire Department, established in 1870, operates six fire stations in the city.

== Notable people ==
Since its 1762 founding, Allentown has been the birthplace or home to several notable Americans, including:

- Saquon Barkley, professional football player, Philadelphia Eagles
- Stephen Barrett, former psychiatrist and co-founder, Quackwatch
- Clair Blank, former author, Beverly Gray mystery series
- Chakaia Booker, sculptor
- Lillian Briggs, former rock music singer
- Thom Browne, fashion designer
- Frank Buchman, founder, Oxford Group and Moral Re-Armament religious movements
- Howard J. Buss, composer and music publisher
- Leon Carr, former Broadway composer and television advertising songwriter
- Francesco Caruso, soccer player
- Alexis Cohen, former American Idol contestant
- Michaela Conlin, film and television actress, Fox's Bones
- Dane DeHaan, film and television actor, In Treatment and Chronicle
- Devon, porn star
- Stanley Dziedzic, freestyle wrestling Olympic bronze medalist, 1976 Summer Olympics, and 1977 World Wrestling Championships champion
- Gloria Ehret, former professional golfer and 1966 LPGA Championship winner
- Oakes Fegley, actor
- Winslow Fegley, actor
- Victoria Fuller, sculptor
- James Knoll Gardner, former U.S. federal judge
- Tim Heidecker, film and television actor, Tim and Eric Awesome Show, Great Job!
- Lee Iacocca, former chairman, Chrysler
- Sam Iorio, professional basketball player, Hapoel Be'er Sheva B.C. in the Israeli Basketball Premier League
- Keith Jarrett, jazz musician
- Michael Johns, healthcare executive and former White House presidential speechwriter
- Billy Kidman, former professional wrestler
- Sarah Knauss, supercentenarian, longest-lived American ever, third oldest person verified to have ever lived
- Brian Knobbs, former professional wrestler
- Sally Kohn, political commentator
- Carson Kressley, television personality and designer
- Varvara Lepchenko, professional tennis player
- Ryan Mackenzie, U.S. representative
- William Marchant, former playwright and screenwriter
- Tyrese Martin, professional basketball player, Brooklyn Nets
- Roy Mayorga, musician, drummer, Ministry
- Ed McCaffrey, former professional football player, Denver Broncos, New York Giants, and San Francisco 49ers
- Lara Jill Miller, actress and voice actress
- Hans Moller, former painter
- Aimee Mullins, Paralympian, model, actress
- Marty Nothstein, Olympic Gold Medal cyclist
- Lawrence Nuesslein, former five-time Olympic shooting medal winner, 1920 Summer Olympics
- Lil Peep, former emo rapper, singer, songwriter, and model
- Marty Ravellette, armless rehabilitation patient who saved an elderly woman from a burning car
- Anthony Recker, former professional baseball player, Atlanta Braves, Chicago Cubs, New York Mets, and Oakland Athletics
- Andre Reed, former professional football player, Buffalo Bills and Washington Redskins, and Pro Football Hall of Fame inductee
- Ian Riccaboni, professional wrestling sportscaster, Ring of Honor professional wrestling
- Matt Riddle, professional wrestler, Major League Wrestling
- Jerry Sags, professional wrestler
- Larry Seiple, former professional football player, Miami Dolphins, two-time Super Bowl champion
- Amanda Seyfried, actress, Veronica Mars, Big Love, Mamma Mia!, and Les Misérables
- Dana Snyder, voice actor, Adult Swim
- Andrea Tantaros, former political analyst and commentator
- Christine Taylor, actress and wife of actor Ben Stiller
- Mildred Ladner Thompson, former Wall Street Journal reporter
- DeNorval Unthank, former physician and civil rights activist
- Donald Voorhees, former Emmy-nominated orchestral conductor
- Susan Jane Walp, artist
- Jamie Weinstein, political journalist and commentator
- Lauren Weisberger, author, The Devil Wears Prada
- Susan Wild, former U.S. representative and Allentown solicitor
- Hana Wirth-Nesher, literary scholar and university professor, Tel Aviv University
- Chris Wyles, former professional rugby union player, Saracens F.C., and U.S. national rugby team player

== In popular culture ==
Allentown's reputation as a rugged blue-collar Rust Belt is one of several factors that has led it to be referenced broadly in popular culture during the late 20th and early 21st centuries. The city is often cited as one of the most prominent examples of a U.S. city which was once a global leader in heavy manufacturing but was subsequently impacted by post-industrialization, offshoring, and the loss of substantial manufacturing-related jobs and companies in the late 20th century. Allentown has also been used as a backdrop for films depicting mid-20th century Americana. Several prominent examples include:

=== 21st century ===
- In 2019, portions of the movie Glass were filmed at Allentown State Hospital and other Allentown locations.
- In 2011, Allentown is mentioned in the movie The Hangover Part II as Ed Helms sings a profane, modified version of the Billy Joel song "Allentown" to Zach Galifianakis as they ride down a river in Thailand. The version of the song also appears on the film's soundtrack, The Hangover Part II: Original Motion Picture Soundtrack.
- In 2009, Allentown is mentioned in the lyrics of indie rock band Say Anything's song "Fed to Death," the opening song on their album Say Anything.
- In 2008, in the movie The Wrestler, Mickey Rourke mentions Allentown as a location where he wrestled as he trained for his comeback.
- In 2005, portions of the music video for "Dirty Little Secret", the lead song on the album Move Along by The All-American Rejects, were shot at various Allentown locations.
- In 2002, a primary scene in Season 4, Episode 9 of the HBO series The Sopranos, titled "Whoever Did This", in which character Christopher Moltisanti is ordered by Tony Soprano to dispose of the remains of Ralph Cifaretto after Tony kills him, was filmed in neighboring Lower Nazareth Township.

=== 20th century ===
- In 1990, the movie I Love You to Death is loosely based on the real story of an attempted 1983 murder in Allentown.
- In 1988, portions of the movie Hairspray were filmed at Dorney Park & Wildwater Kingdom and other Allentown locations.
- In 1987, Season 5, Episode 23 of the sit-com Newhart, titled "Good-bye and Good Riddance, Mr. Chips", Dick Loudon, played by Bob Newhart, takes an adult typing class with a teacher who failed him in his sixth grade geography class at Cunningham Elementary in Allentown.
- In 1982, Allentown is the subject and title of the Billy Joel song, "Allentown," which is the first song on The Nylon Curtain album and uses Allentown as a metaphor for the resilience of working class Americans in distressed industrial cities during the recession of the early 1980s.
- In 1980, in the Broadway musical 42nd Street, Allentown is the hometown of lead character Peggy Sawyer.
- In 1975, Frank Zappa references Allentown in his song "200 Years Old," which appears on the album Bongo Fury.
- In 1968, the film Where Angels Go, Trouble Follows was filmed at Dorney Park & Wildwater Kingdom and other Allentown locations.
- In 1968, Hiding The Bell, a historical fiction novel by Ruth Nulton Moore, chronicles the hiding of the Liberty Bell in Allentown during fall of Philadelphia during the American Revolutionary War.
- In 1958, Allentown is mentioned in the Broadway musical Bye Bye Birdie.
- In 1954, exterior shots of Allentown's PPL Building, the city's tallest building, are featured throughout the movie Executive Suite.
- The folk-style song Allentown Jail, written by Irving Gordon, was first covered in 1951 by singer Jo Stafford.
- In 1934, Allentown is featured in the novel The Thin Man by Dashiell Hammett and the film of the same name. The references involve the apparent suicide attempt of Clyde Wynant in Allentown, but it turns out it was another man who was shot.
