= Carbon Lehigh Intermediate Unit =

School district in Pennsylvania

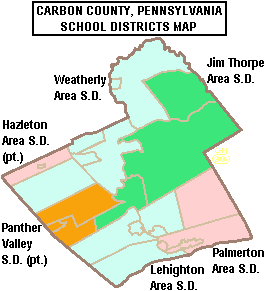
Map of Carbon County, Pennsylvania's public school districts served by CLIU

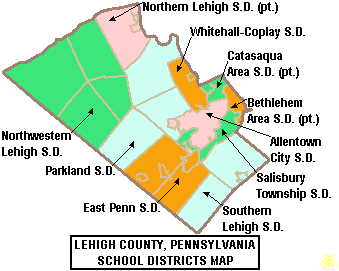
Map of Lehigh County, Pennsylvania's public school districts served by CLIU

Carbon Lehigh Intermediate Unit #21 (CLIU), located in Schnecksville, Pennsylvania, is one of twenty nine Intermediate Unit Educational Service Agencies created by an Act of the General Assembly of Pennsylvania in 1971. CLIU provides services to 14 public school districts, non-public schools in its service region, and two vocational-technical schools located in Carbon County and Lehigh County in Pennsylvania.

The agency has no taxing power. Its revenues come from federal grants, state grants, private grants, annual payments from each public school district in its region and charges to individuals for some services like driver's education. The agency provides many services including specialized special education services and training for teachers to meet their state mandated continuing professional education with some offered online. CLIU21 also operates a Librarians' Consortium for librarians from public libraries, private libraries, school libraries and higher education librarians.

CLIU serves as a coordinating agency for the purpose of bringing together several school districts, vocational schools, businesses, higher education and community groups. The agency is governed by a board made up of one member from each participating public school districts. Members are appointed from respective school boards. Each local school board reviews and must approve the intermediate unit's annual budget in the spring of each school year.

The agency serves the following 14 school district in the Lehigh Valley and Northeastern Pennsylvania:

- Allentown School District
- Catasauqua Area School District
- East Penn School District
- Jim Thorpe Area School District
- Lehighton Area School District
- Northern Lehigh School District
- Northwestern Lehigh School District
- Palmerton Area School District
- Panther Valley School District
- Parkland School District
- Salisbury Township School District
- Southern Lehigh School District
- Weatherly Area School District
- Whitehall-Coplay School District

It also services the following private or parochial schools:

- Al Ahad Islamic School
- Allentown Central Catholic High School
- Arts Academy Charter School
- Blue Mountain Christian Day School
- Cambridge Day School
- Carbon Career and Technical Institute
- Children First Community Academy
- Circle of Seasons Charter School
- Devine School
- Emmaus Baptist Academy
- Goddard School
- Innovative Arts Academy Charter School
- Jewish Day School of the Lehigh Valley
- Lehigh Career and Technical Institute
- Lehigh Childrens Academy
- Lincoln Leadership Academy Charter School
- Manarah Islamic Academy
- Medical Academy Charter School
- Packer Ridge Academy
- Resurrected Life Childrens Academy
- Roberto Clemente Charter School
- Sacred Heart of Jesus School
- Salem Christian School
- Salvaggio Academy
- Seven Generations Charter School
- St Ann School
- St Elizabeth Regional School
- St John Neumann Regional School
- St John Vianney Regional School
- St Joseph Regional Academy
- St. Michael the Archangel School
- Swain School

== CLIU Business Office ==
The CLIU Business Office is the fiscal agent for all revenue and expenditures made by the CLIU. The Business Office oversees approximately 50 different budgets totaling in excess of $80 million. In addition, the Business Office is also responsible for all the external reporting to the Commonwealth of Pennsylvania and the federal government for various programs and budgets of the CLIU.
