= William Allen High School =

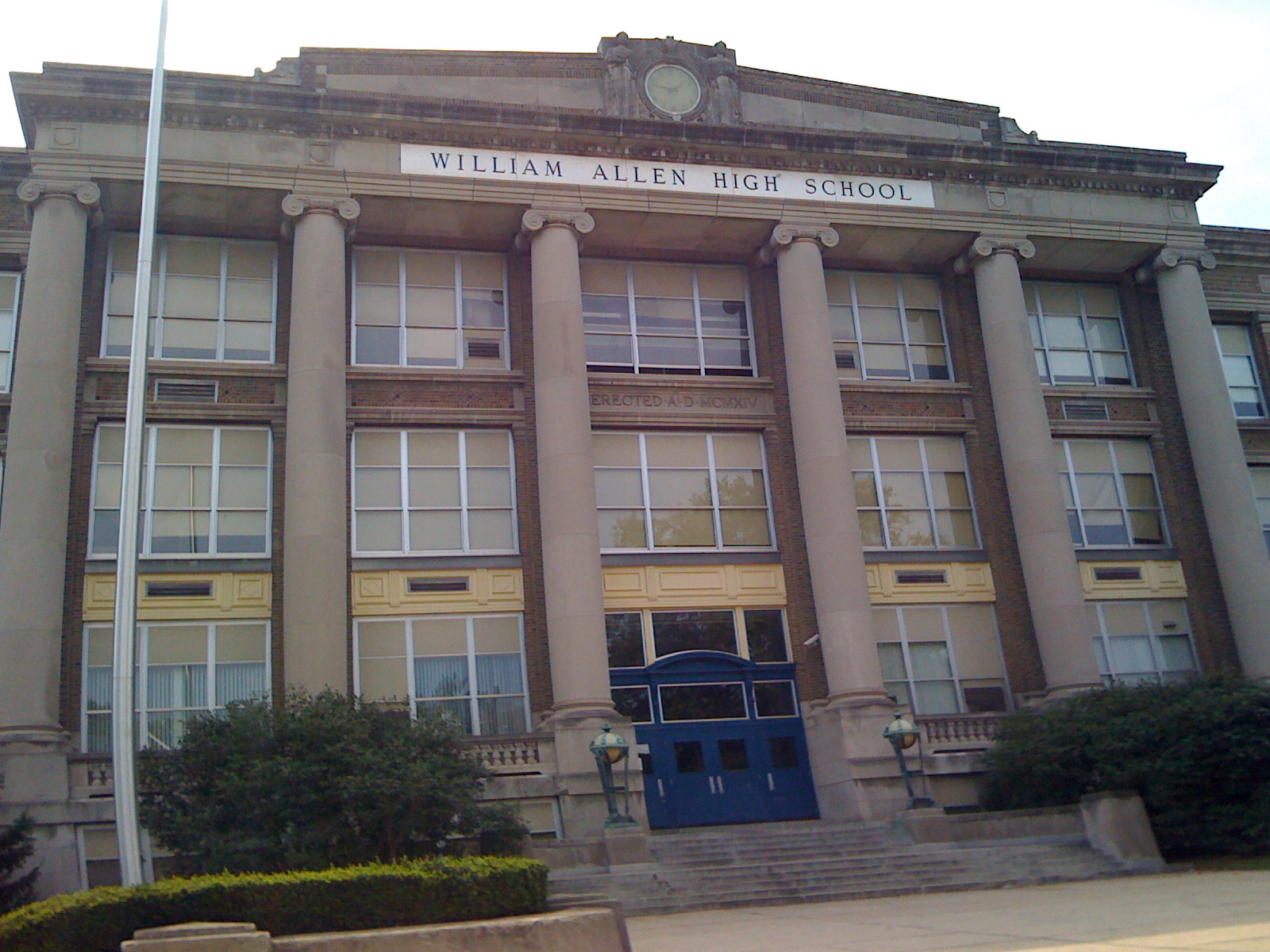
- William Allen High School in July 2008

Location
- 106 N. 17th Street; Allentown, Pennsylvania; United States; 40.60871°N 75.46740°W

Information
- Type: Public high school
- Established: 1858; 168 years ago
- School district: Allentown School District
- NCES School ID: 420228002794
- Principal: Alicia Knauff (acting)
- Faculty: 153.00 (on an FTE basis)
- Grades: 9th–12th
- Enrollment: 3,074 (2024–25)
- Student to teacher ratio: 20.09
- Campus type: Midsize City
- Colors: Canary yellow and blue
- Athletics conference: Eastern Pennsylvania Conference
- Mascot: Canary
- Rival: Dieruff High School
- Newspaper: The Canary
- Yearbook: The Comus
- Website: aln.allentownsd.org

William Allen High School, often referred to as Allen High School or simply Allen, is one of two large, urban public high schools of the Allentown School District in Allentown, Pennsylvania. The school provides public education for grades 9 through 12. William Allen High School is located at 106 N. 17th Street in Allentown. It serves students from center city and the city's westside. The city's other public high school, Dieruff High School, serves students from Allentown's eastern and southern sections. Until Dieruff's opening in 1959, William Allen High School was known as Allentown High School.

As of the 2024–25 school year, the school had an enrollment of 3,074 students, according to National Center for Education Statistics data.

High school students may choose to attend Lehigh Career and Technical Institute for vocational training in the trades. The Carbon-Lehigh Intermediate Unit, IU21, provides the Allentown School District with a wide variety of services like specialized education for disabled students and hearing, speech and visual disability services and professional development for staff and faculty. In 2015, the school district opened Building 21 Allentown as an experimental high school which focuses on building passion among students through career exploration.

William Allen High School is named in honor of William Allen, who founded Allentown in 1762, and served as mayor of Philadelphia and chief justice of the Province of Pennsylvania during the colonial era.

== History ==
=== 19th century ===
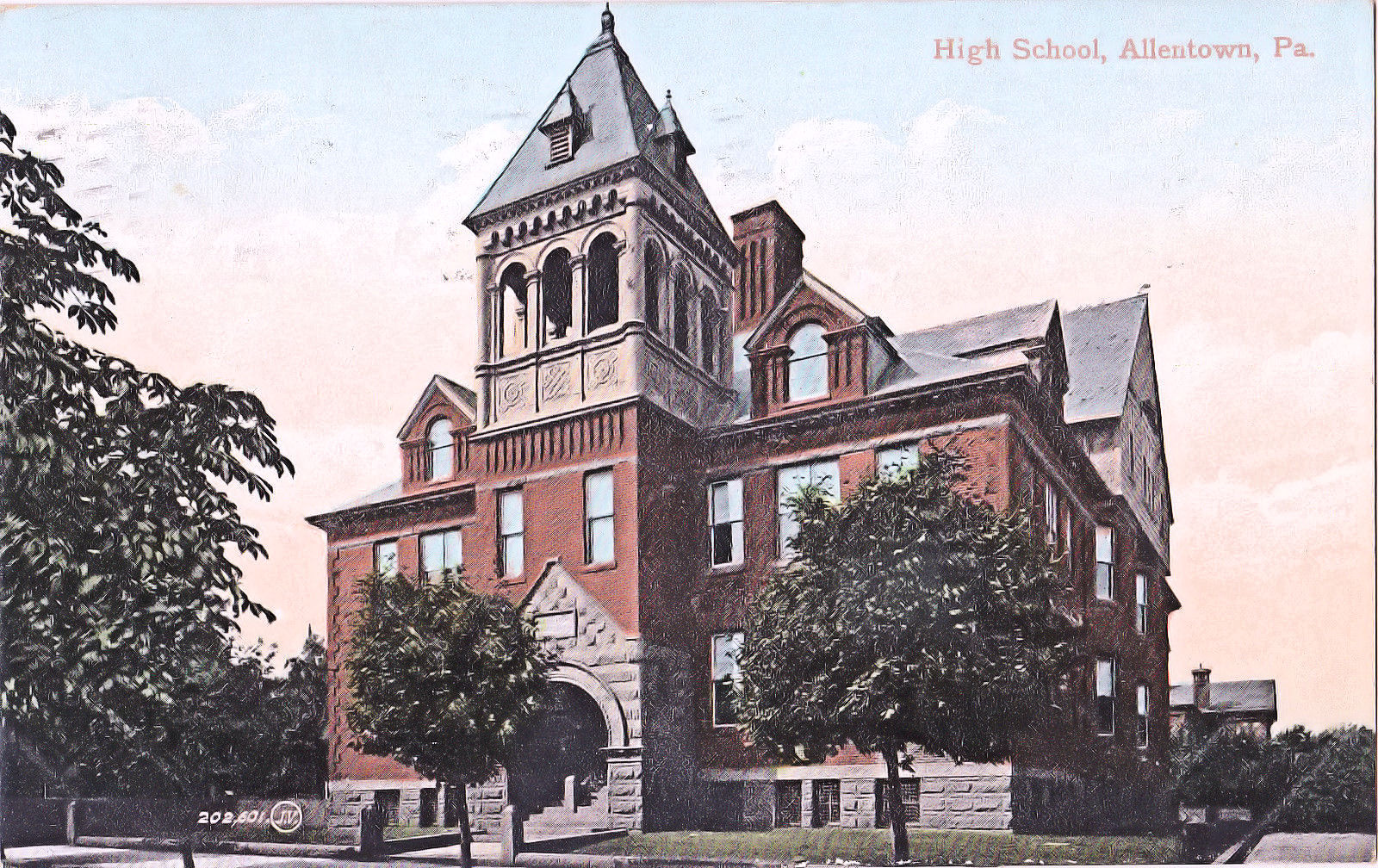
A 1906 illustration of the first Allentown High School building, which opened in 1895 and burned down in late 1967

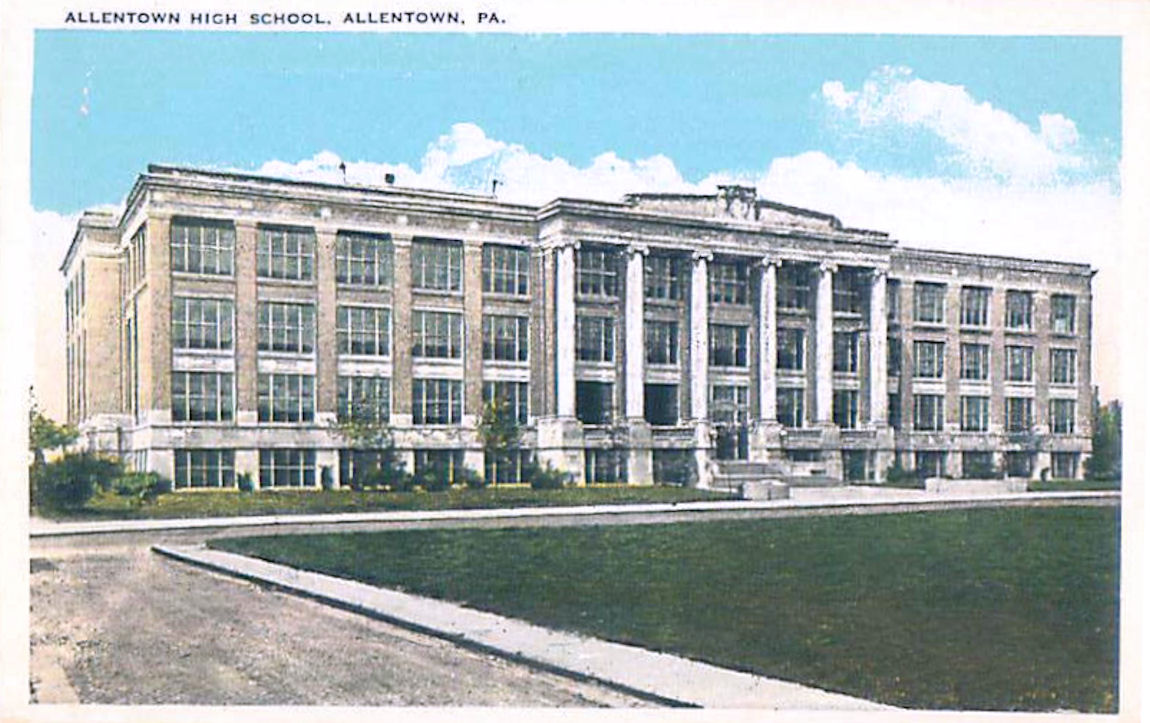
A 1919 postcard of the Allentown High School building constructed in 1917

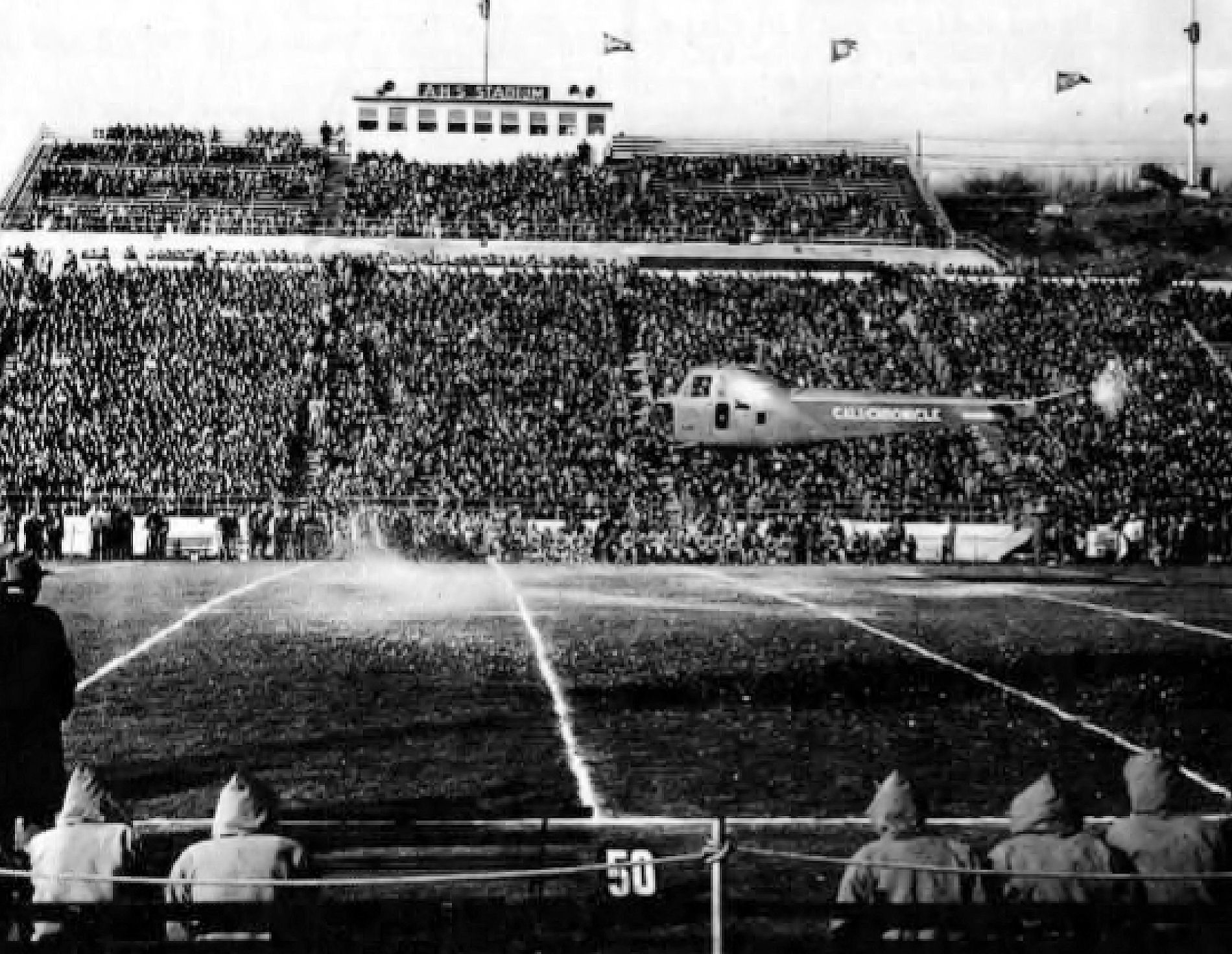
A helicopter landing at J. Birney Crum Stadium prior to Allen High School's annual Thanksgiving Day football game on November 25, 1948

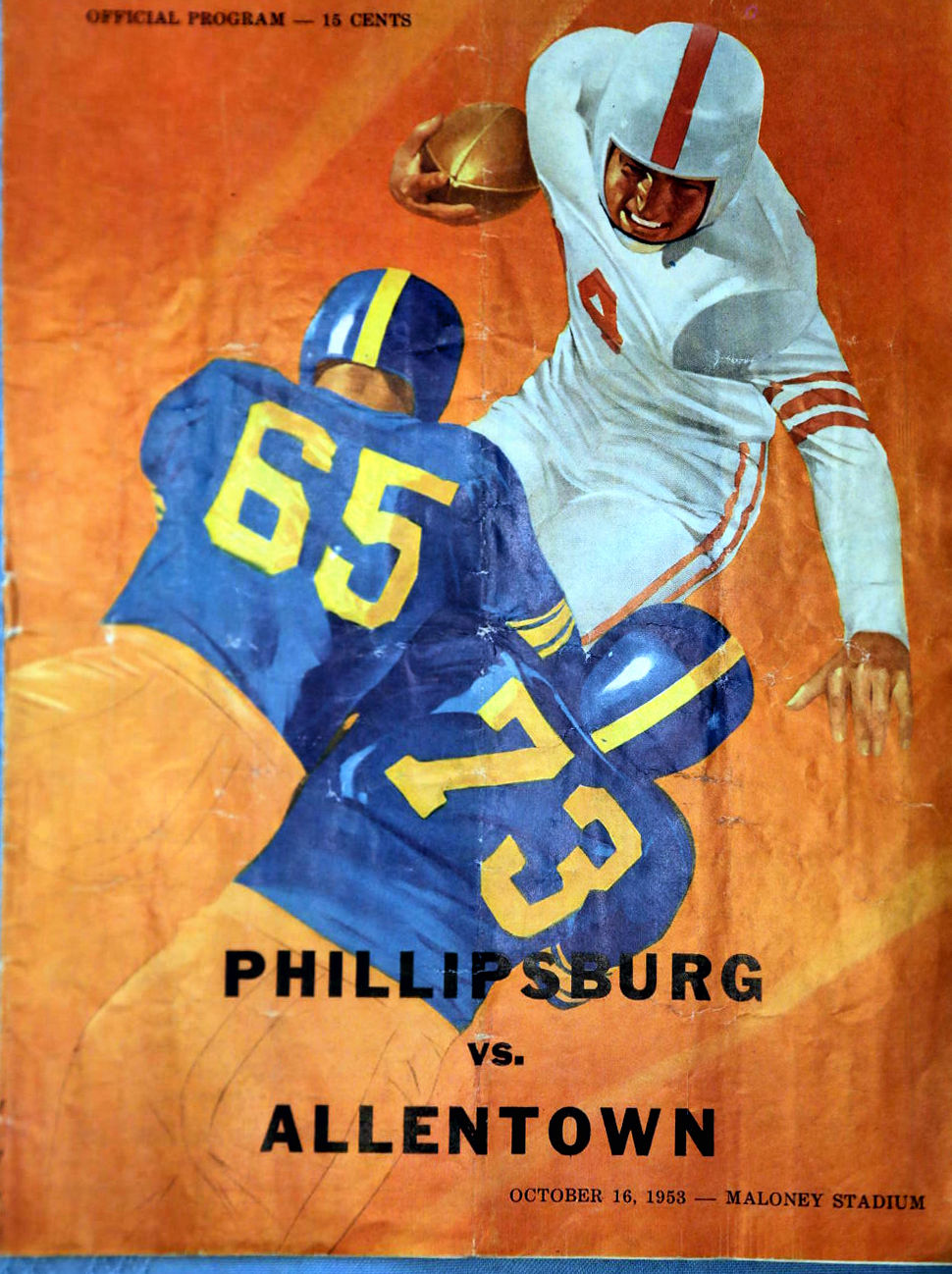
The October 16, 1958 program for Allen High School's football game against Phillipsburg High School at J. Birney Crum Stadium

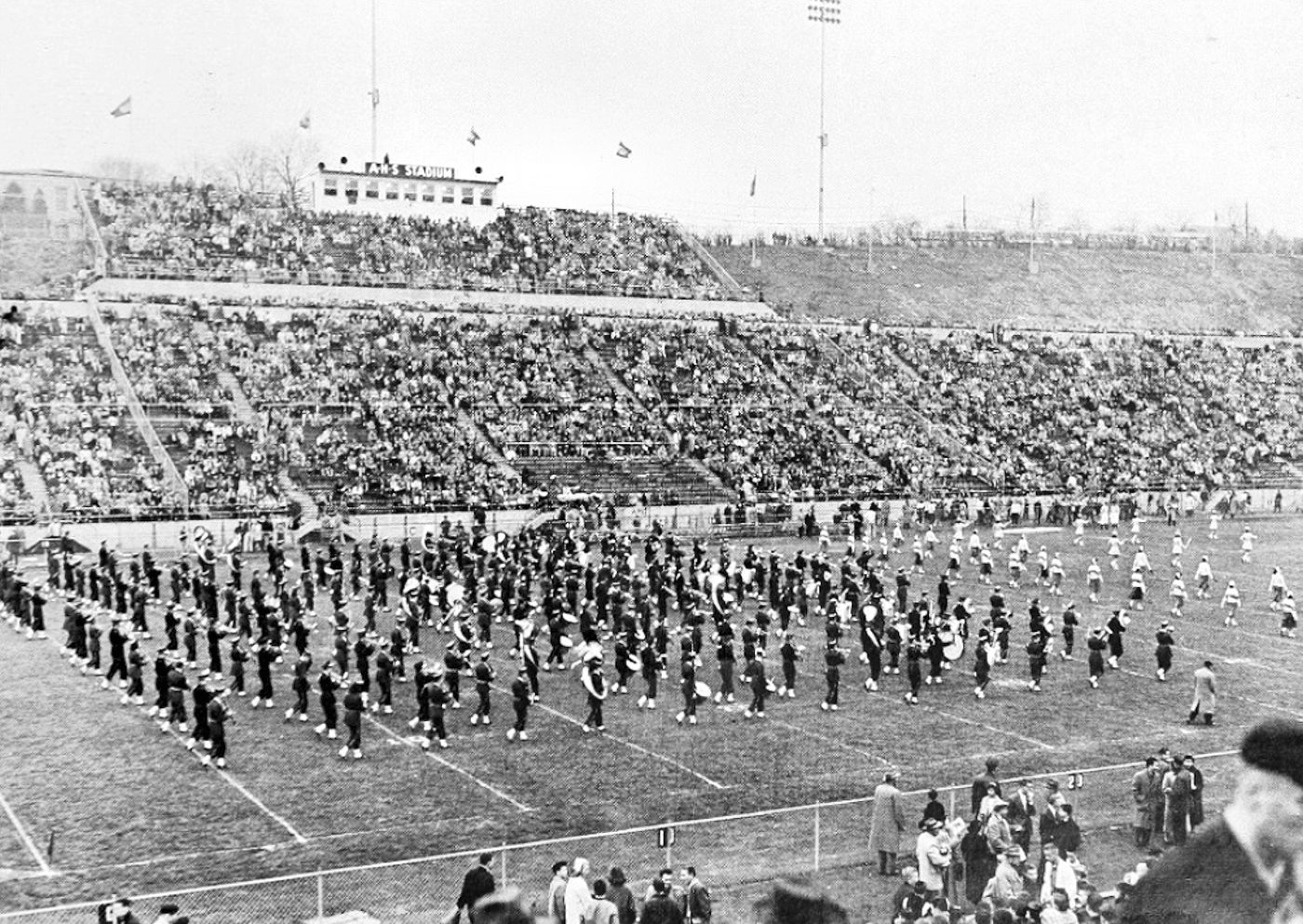
The Allen High School marching band at J. Birney Crum Stadium in 1959

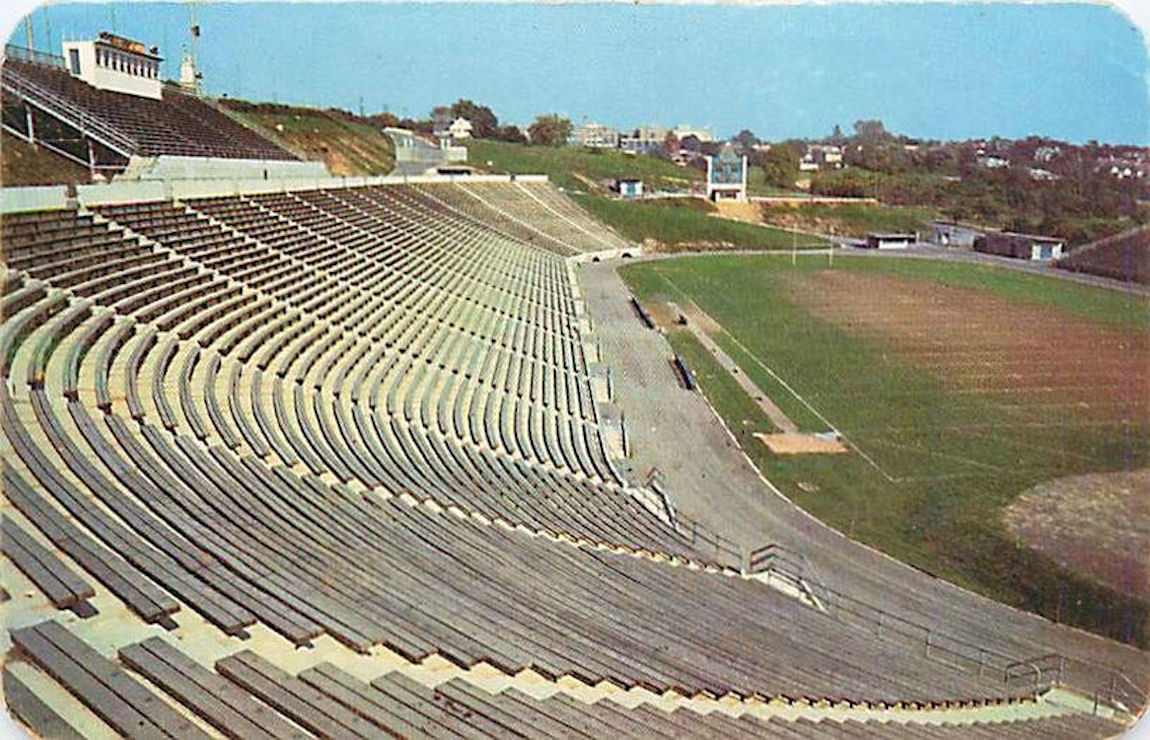
J. Birney Crum Stadium, the largest high school stadium in the Mid-Atlantic U.S. and home field of the Allen High School football team

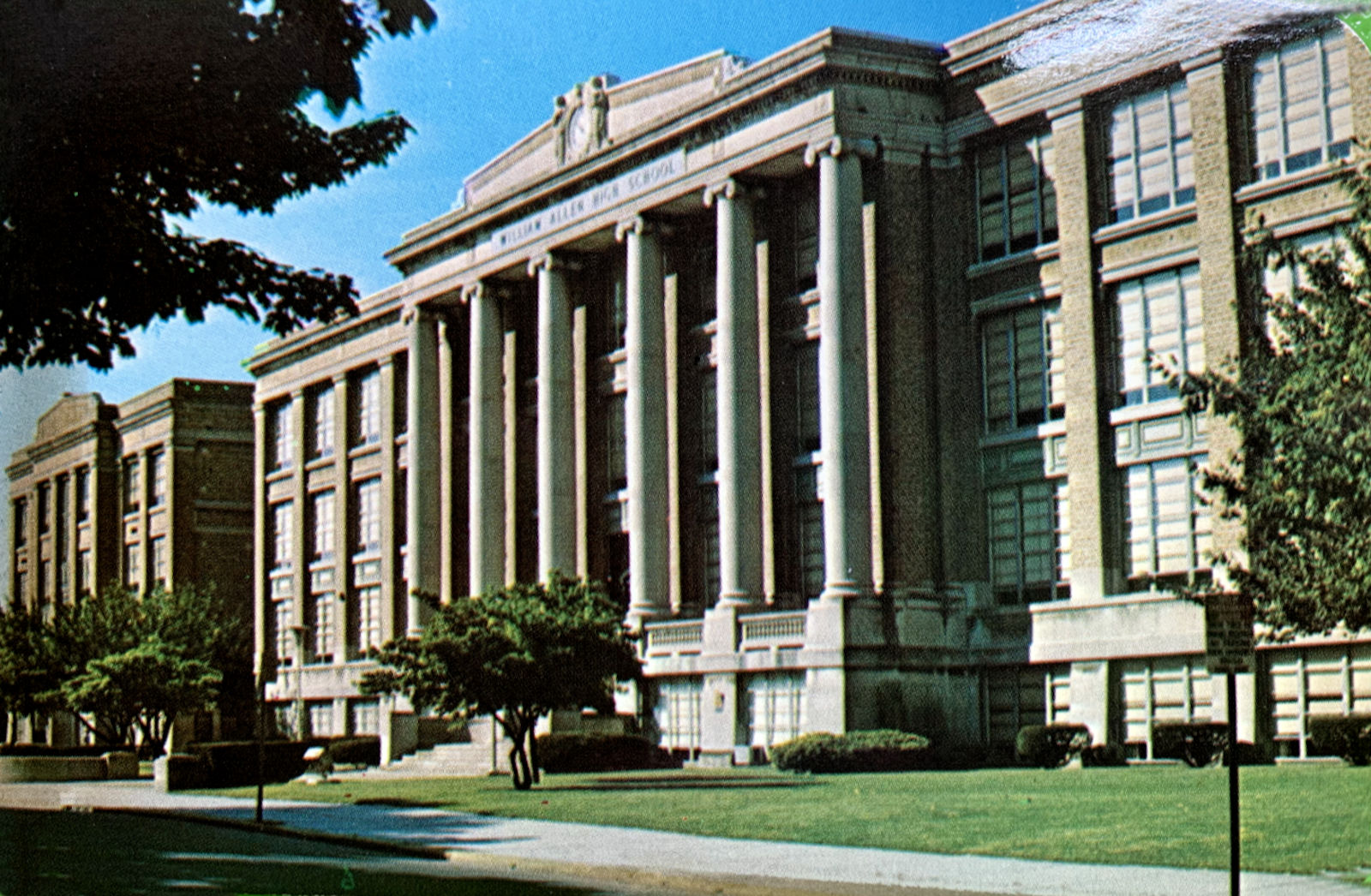
A 1965 postcard of William Allen High School

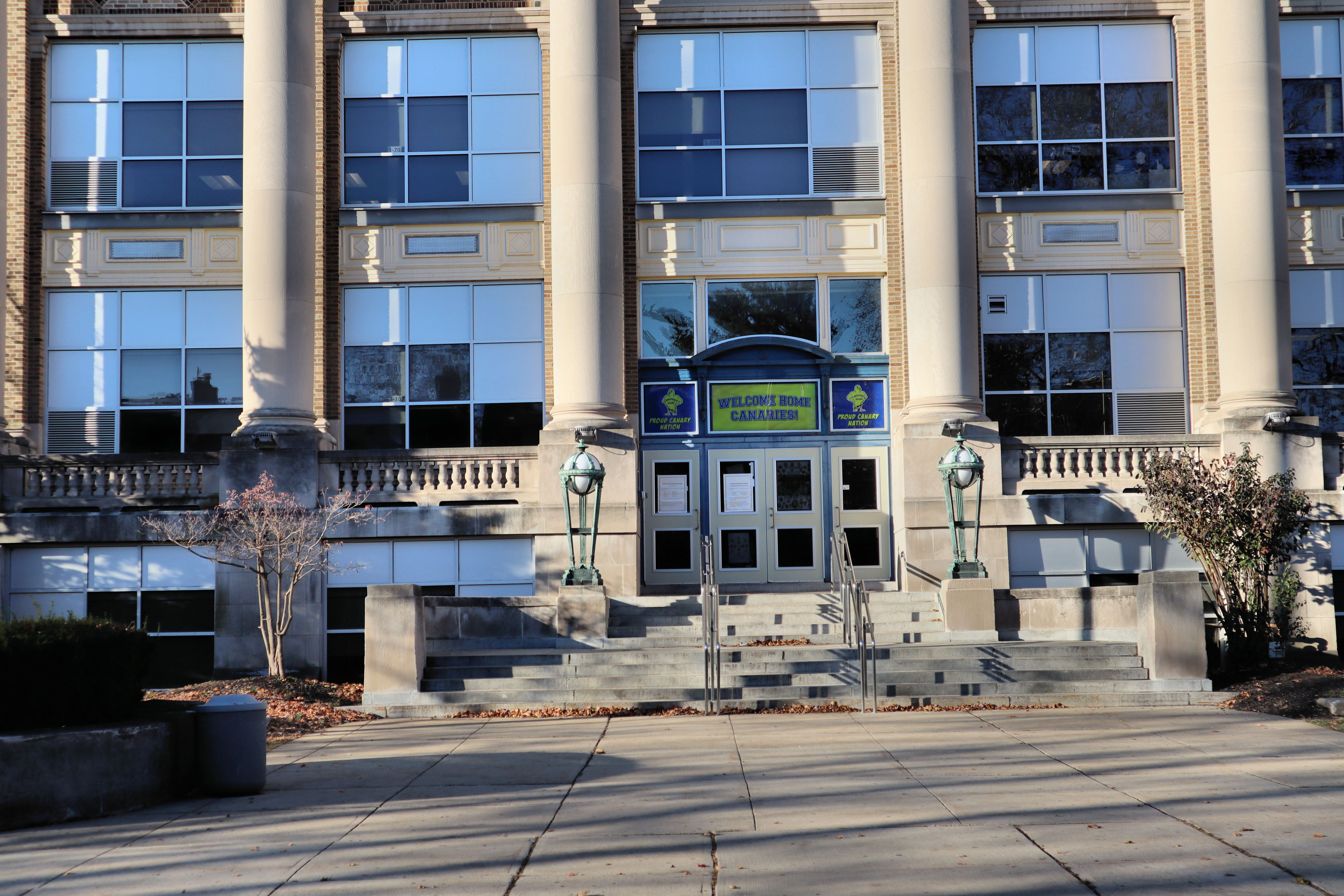
William Allen High School in January 2017

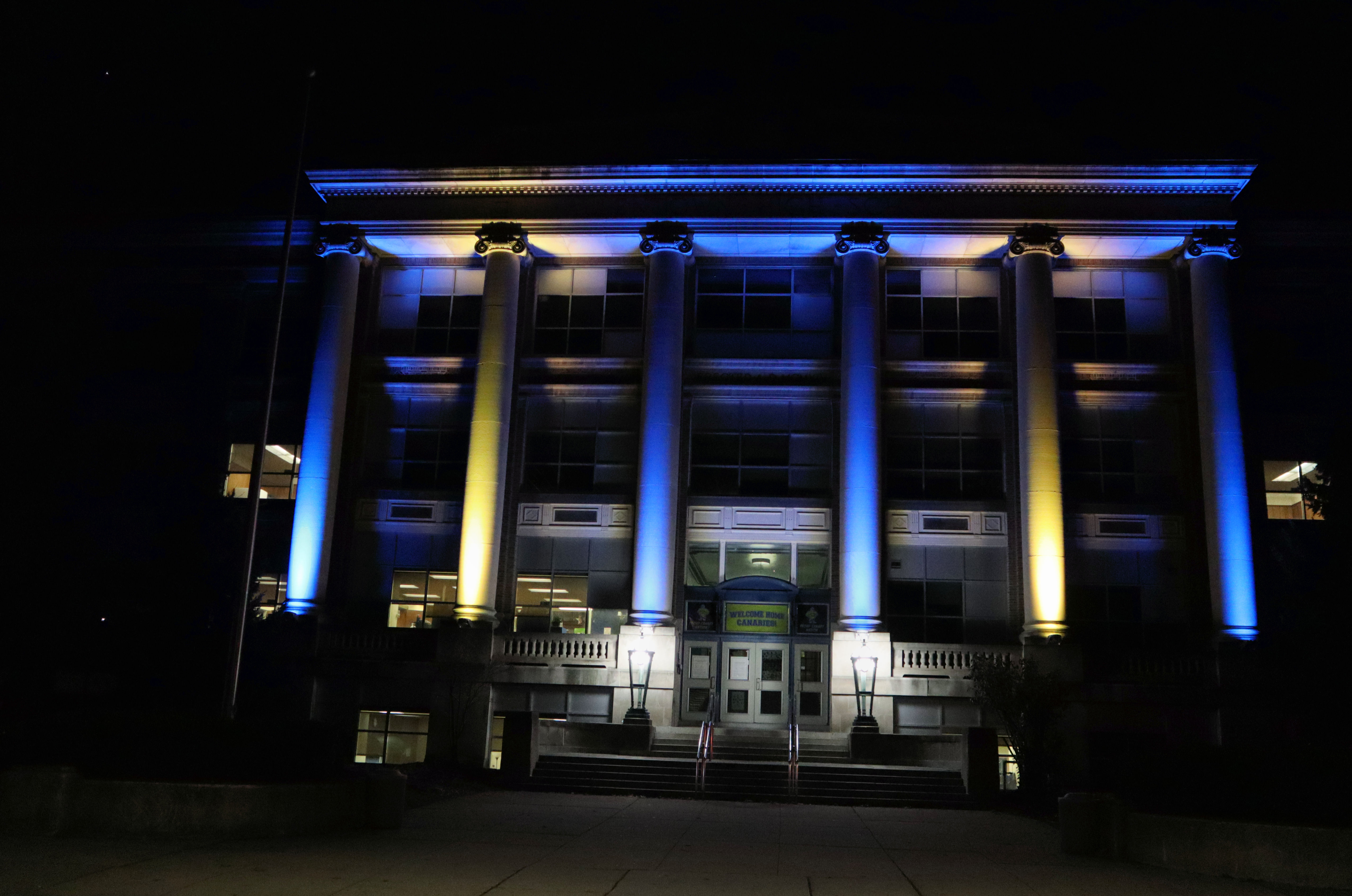
The main entrance to William Allen High School at night in January 2017

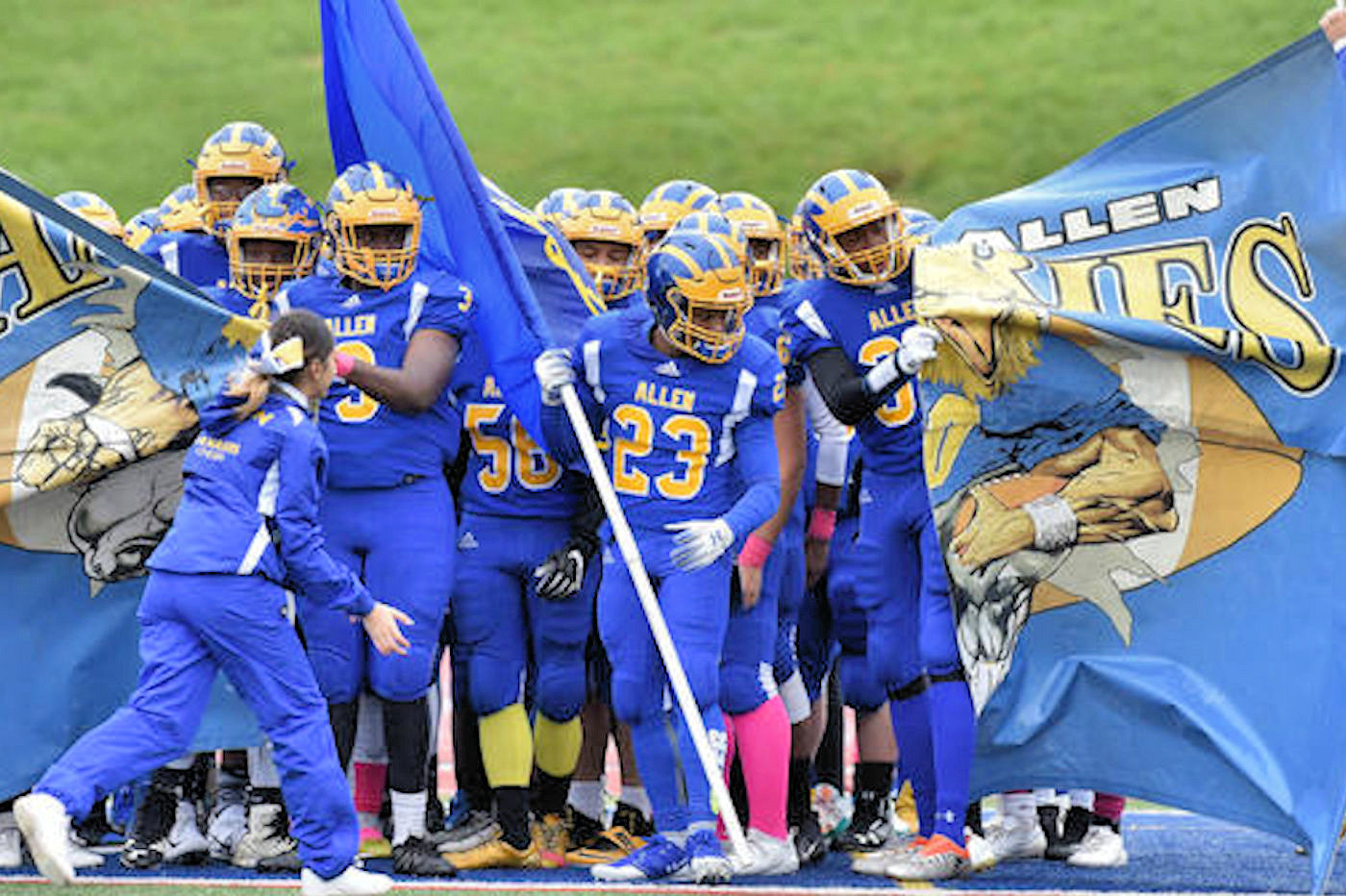
Allen High School's football team takes the field against Allentown rival Dieruff High School in October 2018

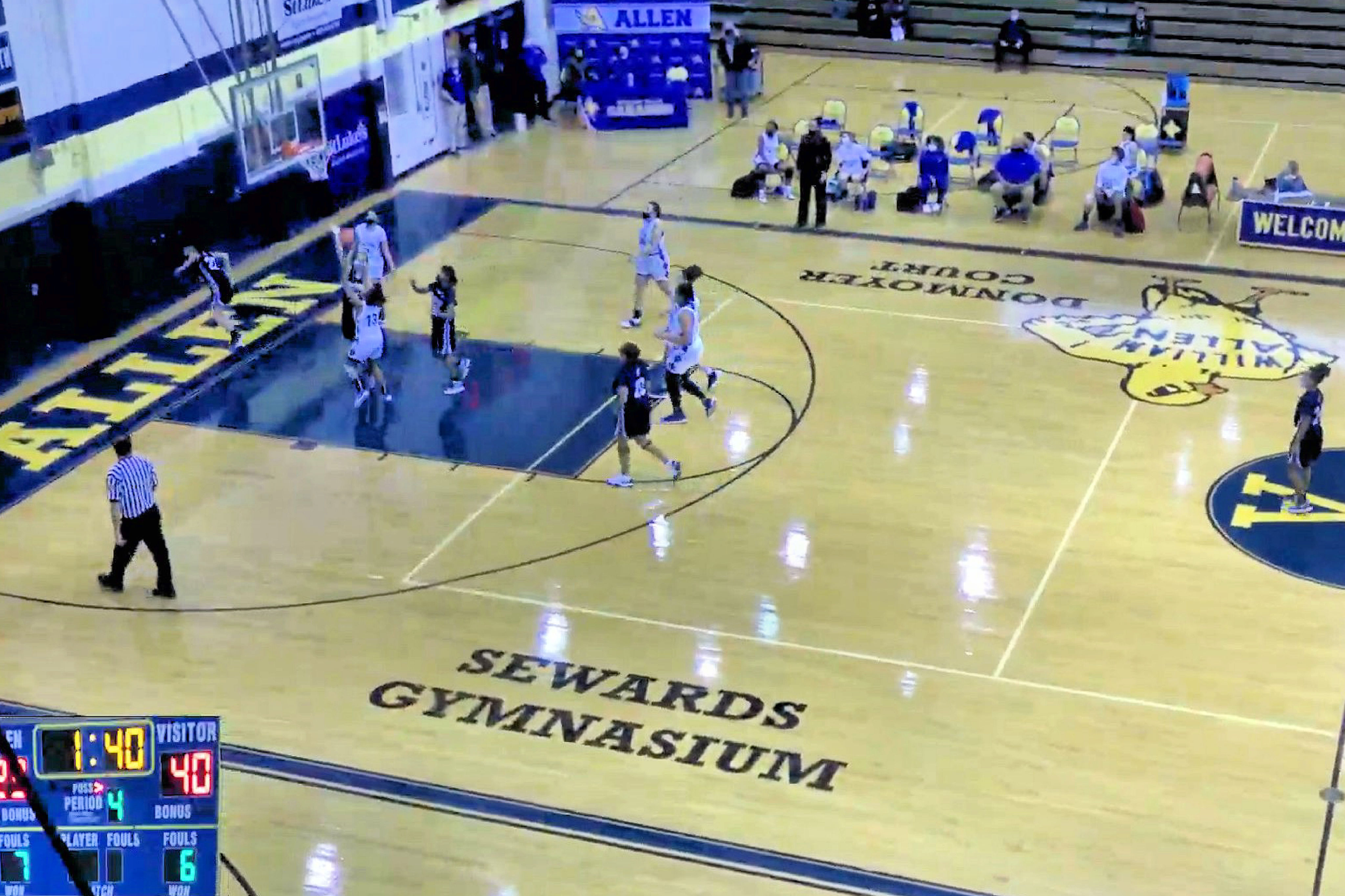
J. Milo Sewards Gymnasium at William Allen High School in February 2021

William Allen High School was established in 1858 by R. W. McAlpine, who took a group of 14 older students to the Garber-Horne Building, formerly the home of the North American Homeopathic School of Healing Arts at South Penn Street, near the present Allentown School District administration building. This was the beginning of what was then called Allentown High School, a name it retained until 1858. Primary and secondary education originally were both taught in the school. The first class was fourteen pupils, equally divided by boys and girls.

In 1859, a separate high school was established by a vote of 6 to 2, one for boys and one for girls. The second school was located at the Presbyterian Sunday School. Augustus Armagnac was named teacher for the male students, and Hannah L. Romig for the female students. The first commencement was held in May 1869 in the Presbyterian Church on N. 5th Street and included three students.

From 1859 to 1894, secondary school classes were held separately for boys and girls. The classes for boys were held in the Leh's store building on Hamilton Street, and the girl's classes were held in the Sunday School rooms of the First Presbyterian Church on N. 5th Street. Classes were transferred to the Fourth Ward Wolf Building from 1880 to 1894. In 1895, they were moved again to a new building built exclusively as a high school at the site of the "Old Central School" at Lumber and Turner streets, which became overcrowded with students.

=== 20th century ===
In 1913, five rooms of the Herbst School Building were used for the freshman class of 1918.

==== Allentown High School ====
In 1917, the current main building of the school at 17th and Turner Streets was completed, and Allentown High School was moved and consolidated into its current building. Until 1928, the school provided education for students in grades 9 through 12.

Allentown High School began its football program in 1896. But the team did not have a designated practice field and used any available open field instead. On September 26, 1928, A. Jack Coffield, an Allentown High School football player, died during a football practice. The following year, in September 1929, the A. Jack Coffield Stadium was opened west of the main building in Coffield's honor. The 15,000-seat capacity Coffield Stadium was the first permanent home for the Allentown High School football team. Over six years, from 1941 to 1946, the Allentown High School team went 60-3-3, outscoring the opposition 1,801 points to 239. Forty of Allentown High School's sixty wins were by shutouts.

The next year, in 1930, the Annex and Little Palestra were built to provide additional classroom space, an indoor gymnasium and swimming instruction. After World War II, additional expansion was made with the acquisition of the Mack and Farr buildings, which were located across Seventeenth Street on the South Side of Linden. These were two late Nineteenth Century Victorian homes. The Mack building was used for Business Education classes, while the Farr building taught various home economics classes. The Hunsicker Building, located in the 300 Block of North Sixth Street, was used for Honors classes; the Nineteenth Street machine-welding shop was leased by the ASD for Industrial Arts training.

In 1948, Coffield Stadium was replaced by the larger Allentown School District Stadium. The Coffield facility became an athletic field for the high school until 1971. In 1949, the Vocational Annex, called the St. Cloud Street building, was opened, which provided room for masonry and auto body repair training. Those classes were moved in 1957 to the new Brick and Auto Body building, which was opened at the unused Coffield site, and the seats were removed in 1955 to be the visitor's stand on the south side of the ASD stadium along Linden Street. The St. Cloud building was then used for several chemistry labs. Also in 1957, the Linden Street Wing was opened on part of the old Coffield site, with the Hunsicker and the 19th street machine-welding shop classes being moved into it, along with additional classroom space.

==== William Allen High School ====
With the opening of Louis E. Dieruff High School in East Allentown in 1959, students living east of Seventh Street were assigned to the new high school. The students living west of Seventh Street remained assigned to Allentown High School. It was renamed William Allen High School on June 1, 1960, to honor William Allen, the Chief Justice of the Province of Pennsylvania, former mayor of Philadelphia during the colonial era, and founder of Allentown in 1762.

In 1972, the Mack and Farr buildings were closed and torn down the next year. Also that year, the Coffield athletic field was redeveloped, and the new William Allen High School gymnasium/natatorium was erected on the site. In 1975, a Library-Science Center was built on the Little Palestra site, which was torn down in 1973.

=== 21st century ===
The Coffield Stadium seats that were moved to the ASD Stadium in 1955 were torn down in 2002 as part of the renovation of J. Birney Crum Stadium, which is now the largest high school football stadium in the Mid-Atlantic U.S. In 2010, a new 9th-grade center was built on the former St. Cloud Building site at the corner of Linden and St. Cloud streets. It was then dedicated as the "Clifford S. Bartholomew Building."

In 2010 and 2011, the largest and most expensive renovation in the school's history was undertaken, including seven other campus buildings. These renovations were made while maintaining the architectural features in the older structures. All the remaining buildings were gutted, and each received new walls, ceilings, floors, windows, paint, doors, stairwells, and air conditioning throughout all seven buildings. New dance studios were constructed on the first floor of the Annex Building 2 with proper floors and mats. Art rooms, chorus, and band facilities were constructed in the Linden Buildings 6 and 7. Art Labs were equipped with proper tables, lighting, and technologies. In the other buildings, renovations include upgraded science lab equipment, new tables in the cafeterias, a multimedia center, upgrades in the black box theater, hundreds of new and refurbished classroom spaces, and elevators were installed in buildings that to provide accessible facilities for the disabled.

As part of the major renovation, $1 million was spent on the auditorium's upgrading, which includes new curtains, seating, an imported stretched oil on canvas portrait above the stage, restoration of historic plasterwork that adorns the walls and ceilings, and a 15 ft stage extension. Lighting and sound upgrades include an ETC lighting console with two dimming cabinets and 20 led color changing border light alternatives, and a custom integrated simple and front of house sound system with an independently dedicated SFX system and Yamaha Ls9 console with iPad for remote mixing. As one patron said, "Parkland may have a nice theater, but this is class."

== Athletics ==
William Allen is one of 18 large high schools competing in the Eastern Pennsylvania Conference, one of the nation's premier athletic divisions. The school plays its home football and some of its soccer games at J. Birney Crum Stadium, a 15,000-capacity stadium in Allentown, which is the largest high school football stadium in the Mid-Atlantic U.S. Most of its indoor athletics are played in the school's J. Milo Sewards Gymnasium. The school's primary athletic rivalry is with cross-town Dieruff High School.

=== Athletic honors ===
==== Boys basketball ====
- 2016-2017:
  - First place, East Pennsylvania Conference boys basketball
- 2010–2011:
  - PIAA District XI AAAA boys basketball Champions (18th time)
- 2009–2010:
  - Second place, Lehigh Valley Conference boys basketball
- 2007–2008:
  - PIAA District XI AAAA girls basketball champions.
- 2005–2006:
  - First place, Lehigh Valley Conference boys basketball (26th time)
  - PIAA District XI AAAA boys basketball champions (17th time)
- 2003:
  - Second place, PIAA District XI AAAA boys basketball
- 2002:
  - First place, PIAA District XI AAAA boys basketball
- Historical:
  - Five-time Pennsylvania state boys basketball tournament champions
  - One-time Pennsylvania state girls basketball tournament champions
  - 7th in Pennsylvania history for all time boys basketball wins with 1,588

==== Football ====
- 520 overall wins
- 21 Conference Championships
- District 11 champions 1992
- Eight undefeated teams (1929, 1930, 1931, 1941, 1944, 1946, 1953, and 1957)

== Arts ==
The William Allen Theater Department performs an annual fall drama and spring musical.

== Pennsylvania ValleyDawgs ==
The Pennsylvania ValleyDawgs, a member of the now defunct United States Basketball League, played their home games in William Allen's gymnasium for the totality of the league's existence from 1999 to 2006.

== Alma mater ==
William Allen High School's alma mater was written by Dorothy Newhard Knoff in 1912, and was set to music composed by Warren F. Acker in 1900.

All hail our Alma Mater dear,
Our voice of praise and glory hear
To whom all reverence we bear,
Of you forgetful we'll be ne'er.
We shall forever for you yearn
And cherish all that we may learn
Through future days of life,
'Mid joy and strife;
True may we stand, both to you
And Canary and Blue.

Throughout the land of you we'll sing,
Loud will our praises ever ring,
Of days that have passed by,
Fond memories of dear old high.
Oh Alma Mater, hear our praise;
To you all honor we do raise;
Through future days of life,
'mid joy and strife;
True may we stand, both to you
And Canary and Blue.

== Notable alumni ==
- Daniel J. Barrett, author
- Thom Browne, fashion designer
- Charlie Dent, former U.S. Congressman
- Stanley Dziedzic, Olympic wrestling bronze medal winner and three-time NCAA Division I collegiate wrestling champion
- Anna Mae Hays, first female U.S. Army General
- Bob Heffner, former professional baseball player, Boston Red Sox, California Angels, and Cleveland Indians
- Nate Hobgood-Chittick, former professional football player, Indianapolis Colts, Kansas City Chiefs, New York Giants, San Francisco 49ers, and St. Louis Rams
- Laurel Hurley, former Metropolitan Opera soprano
- Lee Iacocca, former chairman, Chrysler
- Marsha I. Lester, physical chemistry professor, University of Pennsylvania
- Norton Lichtenwalner, former U.S. Congressman
- Mike Lush, former professional football player, Atlanta Falcons, Indianapolis Colts, and Minneapolis Vikings
- Tyrese Martin, professional basketball player, Brooklyn Nets
- Michael McDonald, former costume designer, Tony Award, and Drama Desk nominee for Hair
- Monk Meyer, former U.S. Army Brigadier General and runner-up for Heisman Trophy
- Lara Jill Miller, actress and voice actress, NBC's Gimme a Break! and Nickelodeon's The Amanda Show
- Irene Ng, former actress, Nickelodeon's The Mystery Files of Shelby Woo
- Larry Seiple, former professional football player, Miami Dolphins
- Amanda Seyfried, actress, Veronica Mars, Big Love, Mamma Mia!, and Les Misérables
- Marci Shore, author, historian, and professor, University of Toronto
- Elsie Singmaster, former author
- Donald Voorhees, former composer and conductor
- Joe Wolf, former professional football player, Arizona Cardinals

== See also ==
- Allentown School District
