= Lincoln Leadership Academy Charter School =

Location
- 1414 E. Cedar Street; Allentown, Pennsylvania 18109-1960; United States; 40.62261°N 75.43426°W

Information
- Type: Public
- Founded: September 8, 2009; 16 years ago, charter renewed 2012
- Founder: Sandra Figueroa-Torres, Chief Executive Officer
- Oversight: Allentown School District and Pennsylvania Department of Education
- School number: (484) 860-3300
- Faculty: 74
- Grades: K–12
- Enrollment: 973 (2024-25)
- Student to teacher ratio: 13.77
- Website: www.llacslv.com

Lincoln Leadership Academy Charter School is a mid-size, urban, public charter school located in Allentown, Pennsylvania. It is one of four public charter schools operating in Lehigh County, Pennsylvania.

As of the 2024-25 school year, enrollment was 973 in grades first through 12th. The school employed 74 teachers, yielding a student-teacher ratio of 13.77.

In November 2012, the Allentown School District School Board renewed the charter school's agreement for five years, amid concerns regarding Lincoln Leadership Academy Charter School's association with a local church.

Lincoln Leadership Academy Charter School is one of four public charter schools operating in Lehigh County in 2013. According to the Pennsylvania Department of Education, in 2012, there were 50,605 children in Lehigh County who were enrolled in public charter schools.

The Carbon Lehigh Intermediate Unit, IU21, provides the district with a wide variety of services like specialized education for disabled students and hearing, speech and visual disability services and professional development for staff and faculty.

== Extracurriculars ==
Lincoln Leadership Academy Charter School offers a wide variety of clubs, activities, and an extensive sports program.

=== Sports ===
Boys

- Baseball - A
- Basketball- A, varsity JV team, freshman, and middle school teams

Girls

- Basketball - A varsity and middle school teams
- Cheerleading - AAAA
- Softball - A

According to PIAA directory of July 2013

All student-athletes are required to participate in concussion training at Lincoln Leadership Academy Charter School. All coaches at Lincoln Leadership are mandated to pass a concussion awareness course before coaching the children. Parent have access to the free training.
