= Bob Riedy =

American basketball player

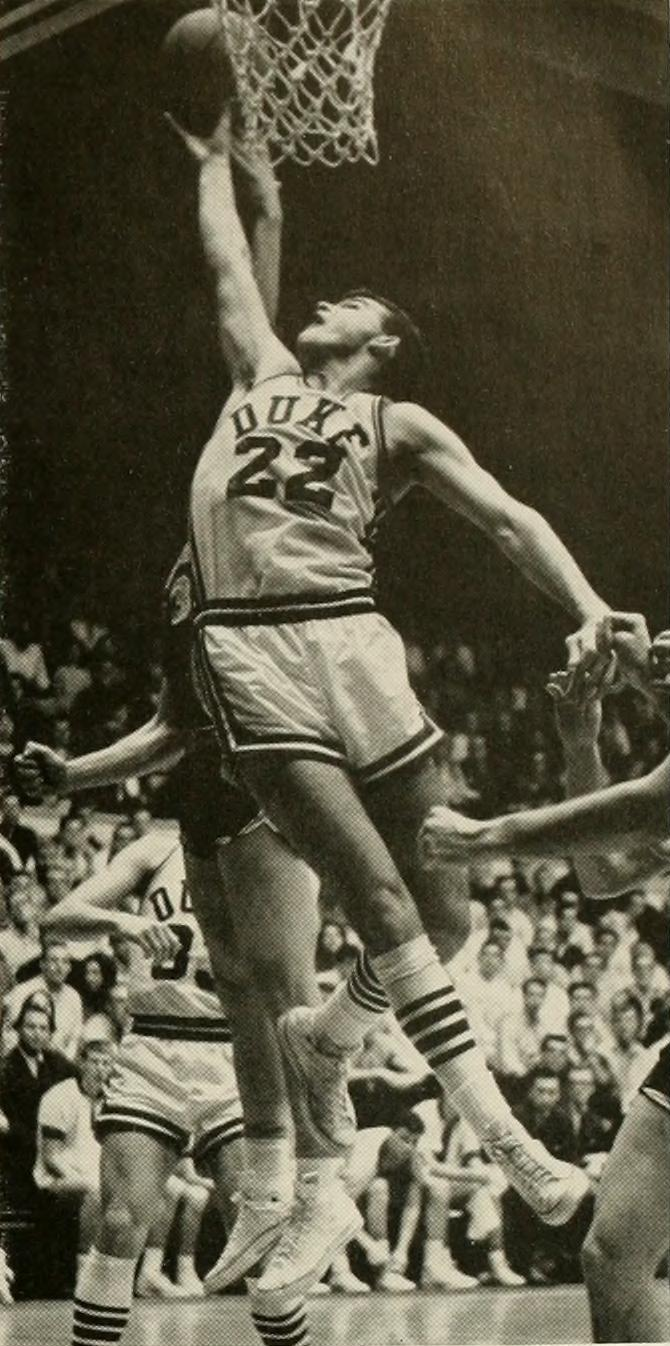
- Riedy playing for Duke University in 1965

Personal information
- Born: August 26, 1945 (age 81) Allentown, Pennsylvania, U.S.
- Listed height: 6 ft 6 in (1.98 m)
- Listed weight: 215 lb (98 kg)

Career information
- High school: Dieruff (Allentown, Pennsylvania)
- College: Duke (1964–1967)
- NBA draft: 1967: 6th round, 56th overall pick
- Drafted by: Baltimore Bullets
- Playing career: 1967–1970
- Position: Center
- Number: 15

Career history
- 1967–1968: Houston Mavericks
- 1967–1970: Allentown Jets

Career highlights
- EPBL champion (1968)
- Stats at Basketball Reference

Robert F. Riedy (born August 26, 1945) was an American professional basketball player in the National Basketball Association (NBA). He played college basketball for the Duke Blue Devils.

== Early life and education ==
Riedy was born in Allentown, Pennsylvania, on August 26, 1945. He attended Dieruff High School in Allentown, where he played high school basketball. He then played college basketball at Duke University.

== Career ==
=== National Basketball Association ===
Riedy was selected by the Baltimore Bullets in the sixth round of the 1967 NBA draft (56th overall pick) but played professionally for the other team that drafted him that year, the Houston Mavericks of the American Basketball Association prior to the ABA–NBA merger. Riedy played for the Allentown Jets of the Eastern Professional Basketball League (EPBL) from 1967 to 1970. He won an EPBL championship with the Jets in 1968.

=== Post-NBA career ===
Following his NBA career, Riedy held the position of Director of PolyGram Records distribution center in Sun Valley, California. During this period of time, he supported the receipt, warehousing, and distribution for Saturday Night Fever and other lines as the Deutsche Grammophon classical catalog.
