= Louis E. Dieruff High School =

Location
- 815 North Irving Street; Allentown, Lehigh County, Pennsylvania 18109; United States
- Coordinates: 40.62167°N 75.44°W

Information
- Type: Public high school
- Established: 1959; 67 years ago
- School district: Allentown School District
- NCES School ID: 420228002795
- Principal: Geoffrey Schmidt
- Faculty: 115.00 (on an FTE basis)
- Grades: 9th–12th
- Enrollment: 1,914 (2024–25)
- Student to teacher ratio: 16.64
- Campus type: Midsize city
- Colors: Blue and gray
- Athletics conference: Eastern Pennsylvania Conference
- Mascot: The Husky
- Rival: Allen High School
- Website: drf.allentownsd.org

Louis E. Dieruff High School, typically referred to as Dieruff High School, is a large, urban public high school in Allentown, Pennsylvania. It is located at 815 North Irving Street in Allentown. The school serves students in grades nine through 12 from the eastern and southern parts of the city and is part of the Allentown School District.

As of 2024-25, the school had 1,914 students, according to National Center for Education Statistics data. Dieruff High School students may choose to attend Lehigh Career and Technical Institute for vocational training in the trades. The Carbon-Lehigh Intermediate Unit IU21 provides the district with various specialized education services, including education for disabled students and hearing, speech and visual disability services, and professional development for staff and faculty.

The school is named after Louis E. Dieruff, an Allentown School District educator. The school mascot is an Alaskan husky named "Kiska" in honor of ten men and women captured by the Japanese on Kiska in 1942 during World War II, some of whom were Allentown servicemen.

== History ==
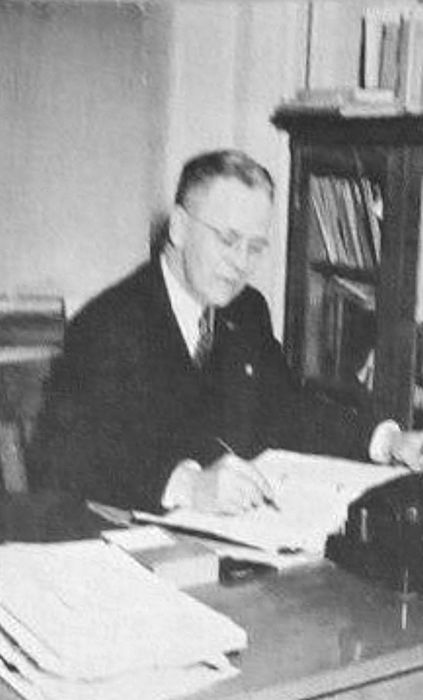
Louis Edgar Dieruff, an Allentown School District administrator and Allentown School District school board member in 1948; Dieruff High School is named for him.

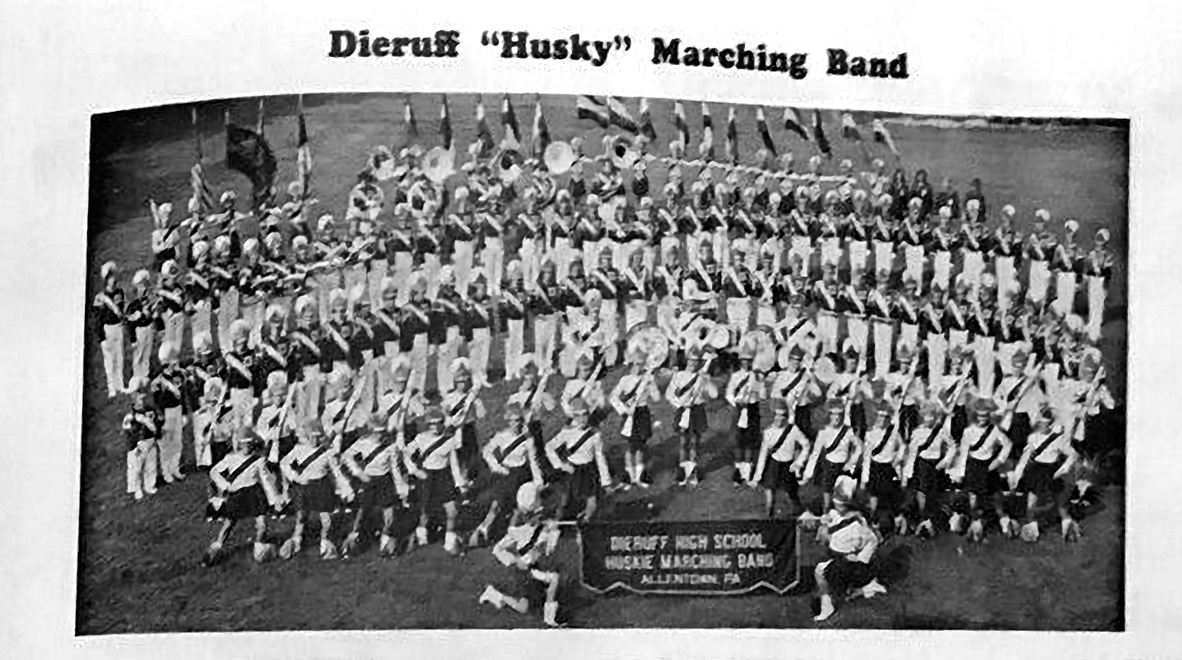
The Dieruff Husky marching band in 1976

Construction on Louis E. Dieruff High School began in 1958. The building was initially intended to serve as Allentown School District's growing junior high school population. The school opened in 1959. In 1965, a planetarium was added to the building. Additional classrooms and the East Branch of the Allentown Public Library, which was later closed and converted to classrooms, were built and added in 1970.

On September 7, 2008, just before 3pm, an EF1 about 50 yards in width touched down near the school, causing minor damage.

In 2009, under the Allentown School District's Comprehensive Facilities Plan, the school launched a $28 million renovation that included the addition of the Michael P. Meilinger wing in 2009, used mostly for freshman classes.

== Student demographics ==
The school's class size is 19.28 students per teacher as of 2021-22 versus a Pennsylvania high school average of 15 students per teacher. The student ethnicity is 60% Hispanic, 22% White, 15% Black, 2% Asian & Pacific Islander, and less than 2% Native American & Native Alaskan. 79% of students are eligible for a free or reduced-price lunch, with the state average of 33%.

Dieruff is one of two public high schools in Allentown and primarily serves students from the city's eastern part. Allentown's other public high school, William Allen High School, was founded in 1858 as Allentown High School and serves students from the western and central parts of the city. Dieruff is the smaller of the two schools.

== Student accomplishments ==
Dieruff High School has had many students who have won various individual awards and competitions, including:

- First place, Scholastic Scrimmage, 1975
- Second place, Scholastic Scrimmage, 1987
- Three straight fourth place finishes in the Pennsylvania State "We The People" Competition in Philadelphia, 2005, 2006, and 2007
- Olympiad of the Mind runners-up, 2005
- Three straight first place finishes in the Midwest Regional JROTC Drill Competition in Galloway, Ohio
- Air Force Reserve Officer Training Corps Drill Midwest Region Champions, 2004, 2005, and 2006
- Two straight first place finishes in the Eastern Regional JROTC Drill Competition in Sewell, New Jersey, 2005 and 2006
- AFJROTC Drill Northeast Region Champions, 2000, 2002, 2003, and 2006
- Second place, Group 1A Marching Band, U.S. Scholastic Band Association's Yamaha Cup. "Best Percussion," and "Best Music" awards at Giants Stadium in East Rutherford, New Jersey, 2006
- First place, Group 1A Marching Band, U.S. Scholastic Band Association's Yamaha Cup at Giants Stadium in East Rutherford, New Jersey, 2009
- Dieruff's yearbook, The 'L Edition, was selected as a national sample and distributed to other schools as a sample of a good yearbook, and was also featured in a book displaying the best of the best from Taylor Publishing in 2009
- Air Force National JROTC Drill Championship, 2nd place, Armed Regulation Drill, 2013
- Air Force National JROTC Drill Championship, 3rd place, Commanders Trophy, George Lopez, Sean Lee, and Alexander Gómez, 2013

== Planetarium ==
In 1965, amidst Cold War fears of American inadequacy in science education increased interest in astronomy before Apollo 11 Moon landing, Allentown School District erected a planetarium inside Dieruff High School.

Following an acrimonious budget debate in 1991, all programs that were deemed nonessential were to be removed from the Allentown School District's budget, and public funding for the planetarium ended with its continued operation and upkeep left to private funding sources. In 2010, the planetarium was closed. Allentown School District's board approved a 2016-17 spending plan that added a number of teacher positions, including a planetarium director to reopen the shuttered planetarium at Dieruff High School. However, the position was never filled, and the planetarium was never reopened. After an evaluation in September, the district administration determined it would be too costly to reopen it.

== Athletics ==
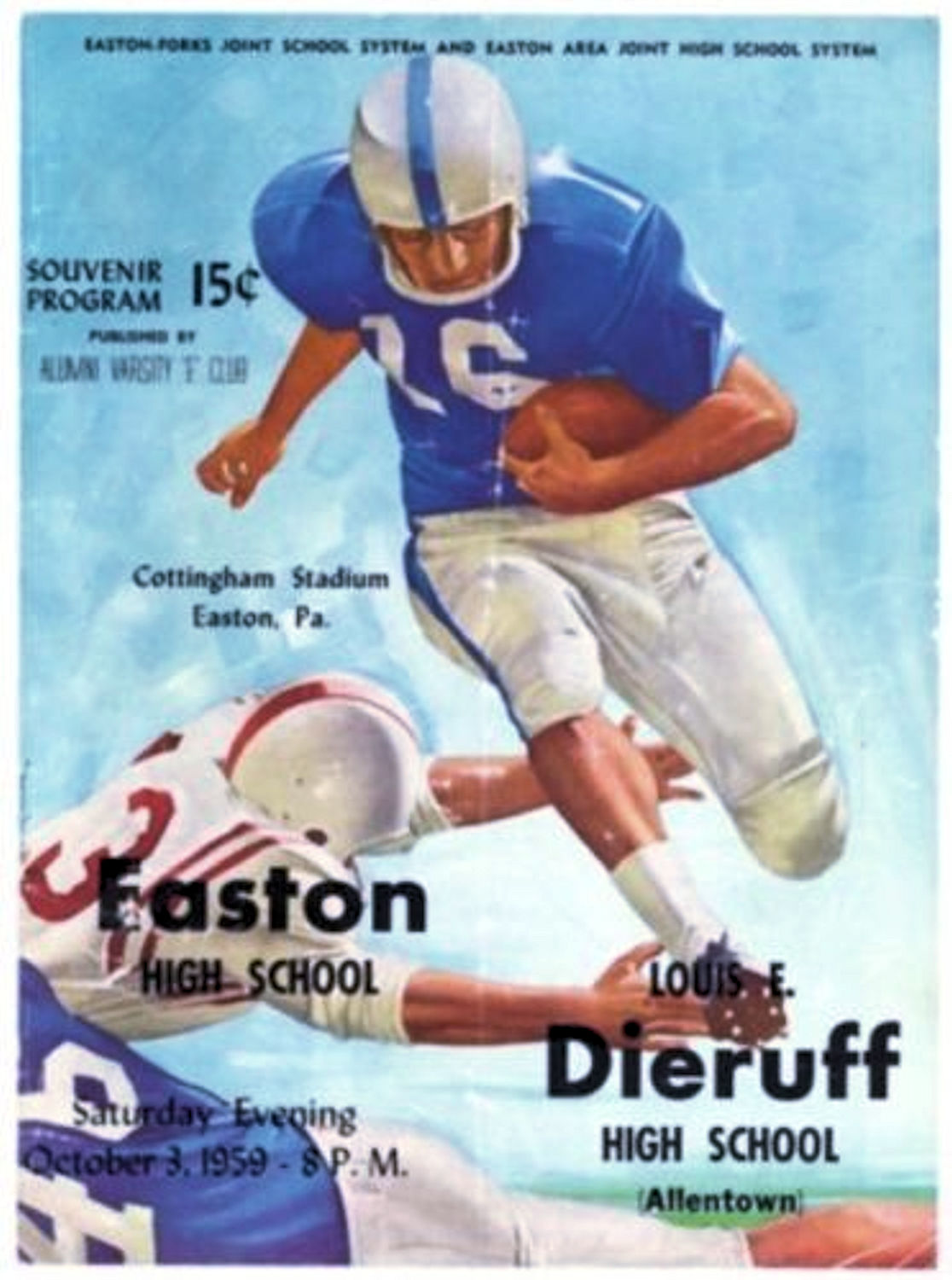
The football program for Dieruff's game against Easton High School at Cottingham Stadium in Easton on October 3, 1959

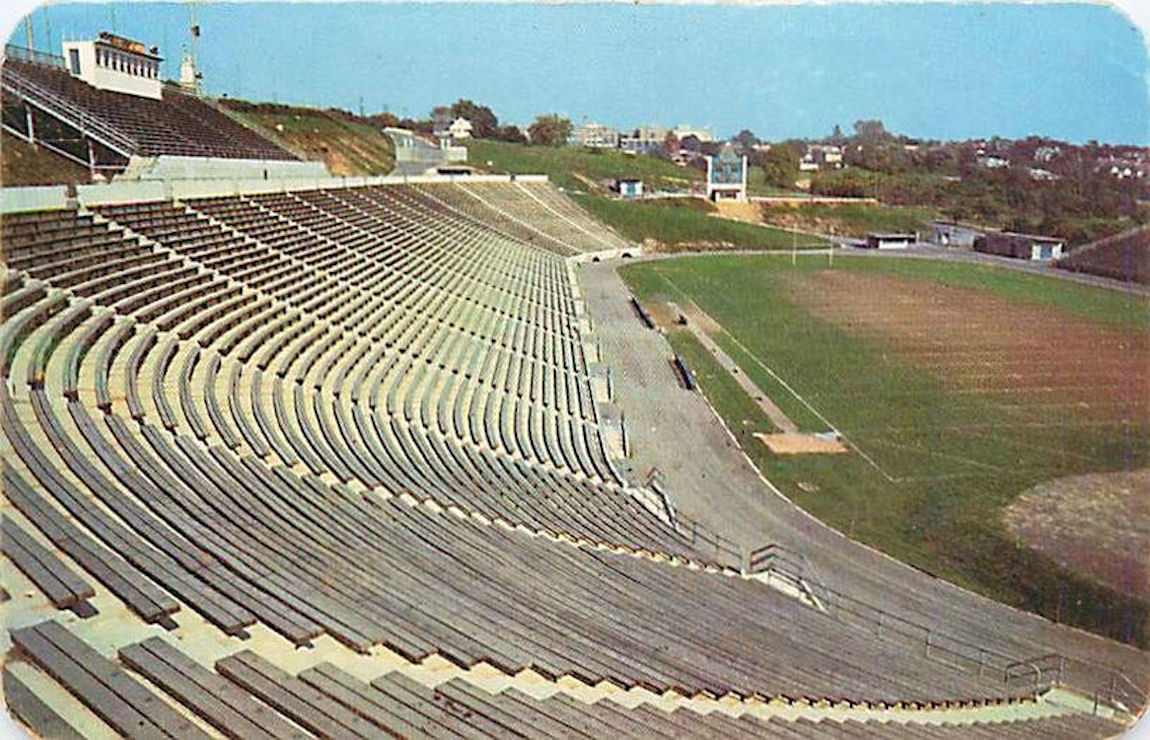
J. Birney Crum Stadium in Allentown, a 15,000-capacity stadium, the largest high school stadium in Mid-Atlantic United States and the home field for Dieruff High School's football team

Dieruff High School competes athletically in the Eastern Pennsylvania Conference (EPC) in the District XI division of the Pennsylvania Interscholastic Athletic Association, one of the premier high school athletic divisions in the nation.

The school plays its home football, soccer, and field hockey games at J. Birney Crum Stadium, a 15,000-capacity stadium in Allentown that is the largest high school football stadium in the Mid-Atlantic U.S.

=== Athletic accomplishments ===
==== Boys basketball ====
- 1966: District XI/Lehigh Valley Conference champions
- 1967: District XI Champions/East Penn Conference champions
- 1968: District XI Champions/East Penn Conference champions
- 1969: District XI champions
- 1974: East Penn Conference champions
- 1977: District XI champions/East Penn Conference champions
- 1978: East Penn Conference champions
- 1987: East Penn Conference champions
- 1988: East Penn Conference champions
- 1997: East Penn Conference champions

==== Boys track and field ====
- 1982: undefeated champions (12-0)
- 1983: undefeated champions (12-0)

==== Football ====
- 1961: Lehigh Valley Big 6 champions
- 1964: Lehigh Valley Big 6 champions
- 1969: Lehigh Valley Big 8 tri-champions
- 1971: Lehigh Valley Big 6 champions
- 1977: East Penn Conference champions
- 1979: Undefeated champions (10-0-1), East Penn Conference
- 1981: Tri-champions with Emmaus High School and Whitehall High School, East Penn Conference
- 1992: East Penn Conference champions

==== Girls basketball ====
- 1975: District XI and PIAA state champions
- 1976: PIAA state champions
- 1983: District XI champions

== Mascot ==
The school's mascot, an Alaskan husky, is an actual husky dog named "Kiska VI", the sixth dog mascot so named by the school since 1959. The husky is named in honor of the ten men and women captured by the Japanese on Kiska Island in 1942 during World War II, some of whom were Allentown servicemen. Dieruff's teams are known as "Huskies."

== Notable alumni ==
- Joseph Atiyeh, Olympic silver medalist, wrestling, 1984 Summer Olympics
- Jeff Bleamer, former professional football player, New York Jets and Philadelphia Eagles
- Rick Braun, smooth jazz musician
- Ian "Rocky" Butler, former professional football player, Saskatchewan Roughriders
- Eddie Mast, former professional basketball player, Atlanta Hawks and New York Knicks
- Sally McNeil, former amateur bodybuilder, erotic wrestler, and murderer
- Andre Reed, former professional football player, Buffalo Bills and Washington Redskins, and Pro Football Hall of Fame inductee
- Bob Riedy, former professional basketball player, Houston Mavericks
- Roman Urbanczuk, former professional soccer player, Cleveland Force, Pennsylvania Stoners, and Philadelphia Fever

== Notable faculty and coaches ==
- Eddie Mast, head Dieruff High School basketball coach from 1983 to 1985, former professional basketball player, Atlanta Hawks and New York Knicks

== Alma mater ==
Dieruff High School, be our stay, wearing proudly Blue and Gray! May we for thy spirit yearn; Help us e’er to seek and learn. Now, hail our Alma Mater strong And may we proudly say: To you we ever will belong! We salute you, Blue and Gray! Though our days we'll ne'er forget, standards you have firmly set! Hon'ring you we'll always try to live alright o Dieruff high. Now, hail our Alma Mater strong And may we proudly say: To you we ever will belong! We salut you, Blue and Gray!
