= J. Birney Crum Stadium =

Football stadium in Pennsylvania, US

- Allentown School District Stadium
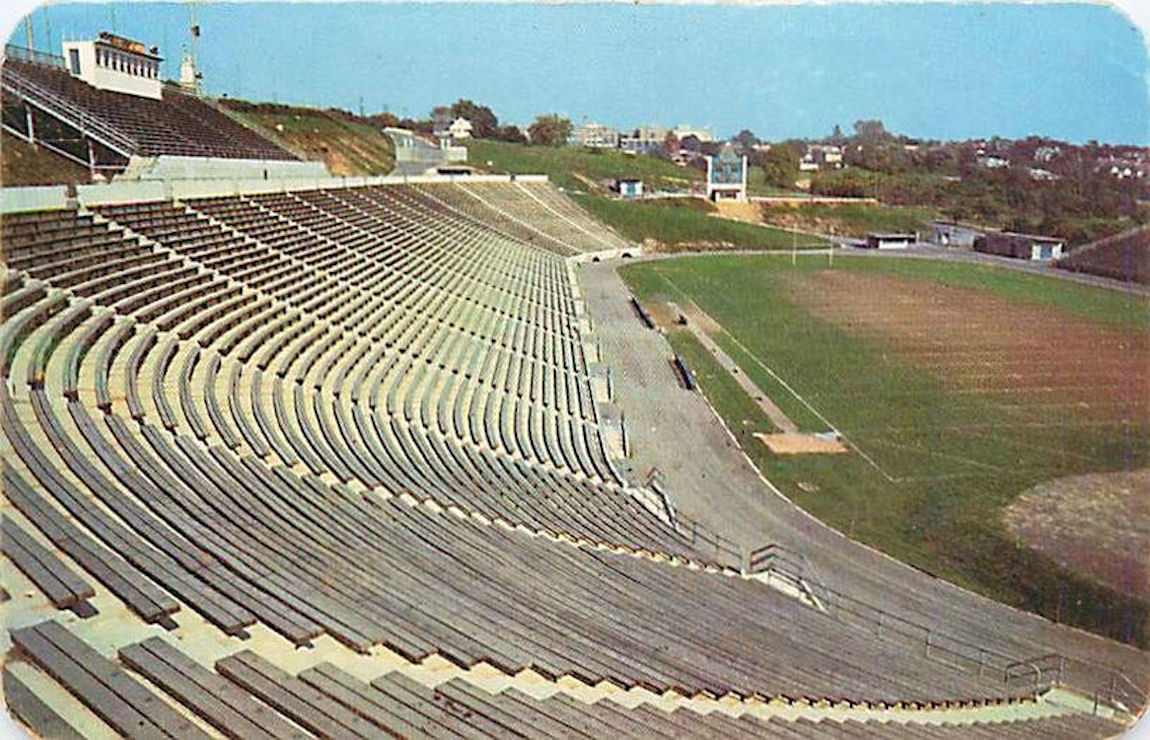
- J. Birney Crum Stadium, the largest high school football stadium in the Mid-Atlantic United States
- Interactive map of J. Birney Crum Stadium
- Address: 2027 Linden St, Allentown, Pennsylvania 18104, U.S.
- Location: Allentown, Pennsylvania
- Coordinates: 40°35′46.11″N 75°30′5.67″W
- Owner: Allentown School District
- Operator: Allentown School District

Construction
- Opened: 1948
- Renovated: 2002

Tenants
- William Allen High School (PIAA); Allentown Central Catholic High School (PIAA); Louis E. Dieruff High School (PIAA)

J. Birney Crum Stadium is a 15,000-capacity outdoor stadium in Allentown, Pennsylvania, used predominantly by three Allentown-based high school football teams. As of 2024, it is the largest high school football stadium in the Mid-Atlantic region of the United States.

This stadium serves as the home football field for each of Allentown's three high schools: Allen High School, Dieruff High School, and Allentown Central Catholic High School, each of which compete in the Eastern Pennsylvania Conference, one of the premiere high school athletic conferences in the nation.

== History ==
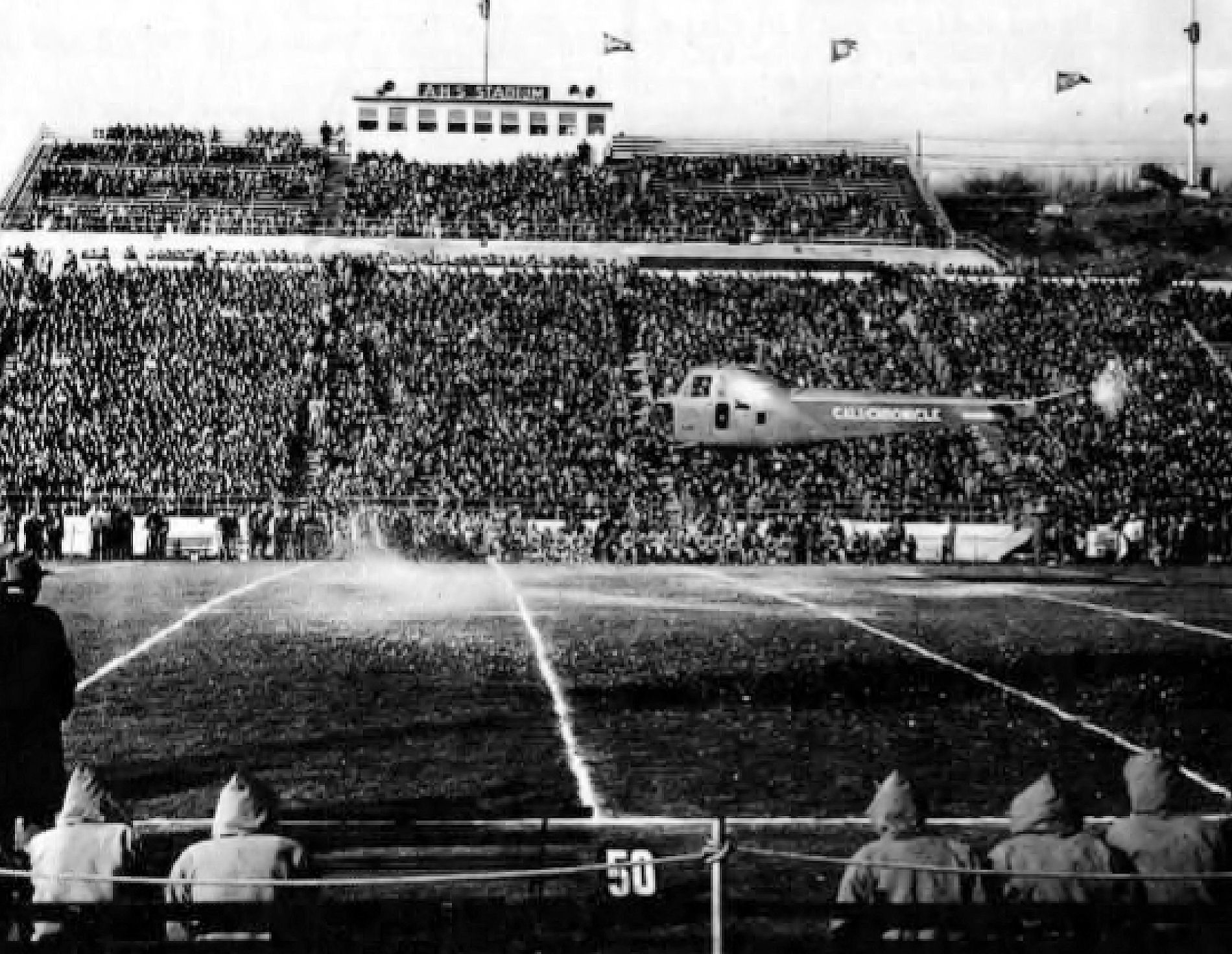
A helicopter landing at J. Birney Crum Stadium in Allentown prior to Allen High School football game on Thanksgiving Day in 1948

In 1948, the stadium opened as Allentown High School Stadium and was sometimes alternately referred to as Allentown School District Stadium or ASD Stadium.

In 1982, the stadium was renamed in honor of J. Birney Crum, a football, basketball, and baseball coach at Allentown High School, now Allen High School, who was inducted into the Pennsylvania Sports Hall of Fame in 1974.

In 2002, the stadium was substantially renovated, including the installation of FieldTurf, which replaced the stadium's original natural grass surface.

J. Birney Crum Stadium is the home high school field for Allentown's three large Eastern Pennsylvania Conference high school football teams: Allen, Central Catholic, and Dieruff high schools. The stadium has been the home field for the high school careers of several players who went on to NFL careers, including Ed McCaffrey of the Denver Broncos and New York Giants, Andre Reed of the Buffalo Bills and Washington Redskins and a Hall of Fame Inductee, Tony Stewart of the Philadelphia Eagles, Cincinnati Bengals and Oakland Raiders, and others.

The stadium hosts a large annual Fourth of July fireworks display that typically draws tens of thousands of spectators and is among the largest such July 4 fireworks events in the Lehigh Valley.

Crum is also marching arts performance venue. The stadium hosts the annual Drum Corps International's Eastern Classic, held the weekend prior to its world championships in Indianapolis.

This stadium also hosts the Collegiate Marching Band Festival, an annual event held in late September or early October that showcases college and university marching bands of all sizes and styles from across the Mid-Atlantic and Northeastern regions of the United States. Crum also hosts USBands A Class National Championships, which features performances of high school marching bands annually in November.

The stadium is owned by the Allentown School District.
