= Salvaggio Academy =

Coordinates: 40.611585°N 75.484534°W

Salvaggio Academy (formerly CAI Learning Academy)

Location
- 3145 Hamilton Blvd; Allentown, Pennsylvania; United States

Information
- Established: 2014
- Director of Education: Jessica Devlin
- Enrollment: 131
- Average class size: 15
- Student to teacher ratio: 7:1
- Campus: Urban
- Website: https://www.salvaggioacademy.org/

Salvaggio Academy, formerly CAI Learning Academy, is an independent, non-sectarian day school in Allentown, Pennsylvania. The school was founded in 2014 by Tony Salvaggio, chief executive officer emeritus of Computer Aid Inc., to provide a technology-enhanced learning environment for elementary and middle school students in the Lehigh Valley. As of 2024, the school enrolls grades K–5.

== History ==
Computer Aid Inc, an Allentown-area IT consulting firm, has developed methods for technology integration in elementary and middle school education. The firm saw an opportunity to open its own charter school in Allentown, which would incorporate hands-on activities and iPad e-reading applications.

The school originally was proposed to be located at a former Catholic school building then owned by the Allentown Diocese. While the charter school application received some support, it was ultimately rejected because the proposal "contained no evidence of support whatsoever by parents or students". This led to the founding of a private school at the location instead of a charter school, since the licensing process of independent schools is much more lenient than for charter schools. The school opened in September 2014 to 70 kindergarten students.

In 2024, the school moved to a larger facility and was renamed Salvaggio Academy.

== Tuition and financial aid ==
Annual tuition for all grade levels was $4,000 in 2014. More than three-quarters of all students receive some form of financial aid and the vast majority of the school's funding comes from donations through Computer Aid Inc.
