= Salem Christian School =

Location
- 8031 Salem Bible Church Road; Macungie, Pennsylvania 18062; United States; 40.4740°N 75.5737°W

Information
- School type: Private Christian school
- Established: 1979; 47 years ago
- School district: East Penn School District
- Head of school: Scott Bose
- Teaching staff: 18.4 (on an FTE basis)
- Grades: PK–12
- Enrollment: 182 (2023–24)
- Student to teacher ratio: 9.9
- Campus type: Fringe rural
- Colors: Blue and gold
- Mascot: Eagle
- Website: salemchristian.org

Salem Christian School is a private Christian school in Macungie, Pennsylvania in the Lehigh Valley region of eastern Pennsylvania operating as a ministry of Salem Bible Church.

The school serves families and their children from Lehigh, Berks, Northampton, Montgomery, and Bucks counties. The school primarily serves the Christian school market in the Lehigh Valley south of Allentown. The school serves students from preschool through high school.

As of the 2023-24 school year, the school had an enrollment of 182 students and 18.4 teachers on a full-time basis for a student-teacher ratio of 9.9, according to National Center for Education Statistics data.

== History ==
Salem Christian School was founded in 1979 with a class of 17 students. Student enrollment and the school's building structure have both since expanded. As of the 2020–21 school year, student enrollment, including prekindergarten and Kindergarten through 12th grade, was 175.

As of 2015, the school was accredited by the Association of Christian Schools International and Middle States Association of Colleges and Schools. It states that its goal is to be the premier Christian school in the Lehigh Valley.
