= Lehigh Career and Technical Institute =

Lehigh Career & Technical Institute

Location
- 4500 Education Park Drive; Schnecksville, Pennsylvania 18078
- 40.664315°N 75.607878°W

Information
- School type: Career and Technical
- Opened: 1971
- Status: Open
- NCES School ID: 428029007076
- Director: Dr. Lisa Greenawalt
- Faculty: 86.5 (on an FTE basis)
- Enrollment: 22 (2024–25)
- Student to teacher ratio: 0.25
- Classes offered: 45
- Website: www.lcti.org

Lehigh Career and Technical Institute (LCTI) is a career and technical institute located in Schnecksville, Pennsylvania in the Lehigh Valley region of eastern Pennsylvania. It is one of the largest career and technical institutes in the United States.

LCTI has a variety of programs offered to all of its students, and also offers an academic option.

== History ==
Founded in 1971, Lehigh Career and Technical Institute is located in Schnecksville, Pennsylvania.

Located 10 miles north of Allentown, the school serves students in grades 9-12 from the nine Lehigh County school districts:

- Allentown School District
- Catasauqua Area School District
- East Penn School District
- Northern Lehigh School District
- Northwestern Lehigh School District
- Parkland School District
- Salisbury Township School District
- Southern Lehigh School District
- Whitehall-Coplay School District

This region includes: Allen High School, Dieruff High School, Catasauqua High School, Emmaus High School, Northern Lehigh High School, Northwestern Lehigh High School, Parkland High School, Salisbury High School, Southern Lehigh High School, and Whitehall High School.

LCTI offers more than 50 programs in a hands-on format, with a focus on national skill standards and rigorous academics. LCTI recently completed a modernization project that has increased lab sizes, updated equipment, and added an Academic Center.

== Student options ==
Students typically report to their sending school for homeroom and daily announcements prior to being transported by bus to LCTI. Once there, students are assigned either to a lab, which is their chosen career specialty, or the academic center, an all-day option for students, which provides them with the typical state required education, and their specialty segment. Students have the option of attending in either the AM or PM session.

LCTI offers Labs based on Careers within the Lehigh Valley. Career programs offered to students include:

- Administrative Office Technology / Accounting
- Advertising Design / Commercial Art
- Auto Body / Collision Repair
- Auto Technology
- Carpentry
- Cabinetmaking and Millwork
- Commercial Baking
- Graphic Imaging
- Computer Maintenance Technology
- Culinary Arts
- Dental Technology
- Diesel/Medium and Heavy Truck Technology
- Computer Aided Design (CAD)
- Early Care & Education of Young Children
- Electrical Technology
- Electro-mechanical /Mechatronics technology
- Electronics Technology / Nanofabrication
- Emerging Health Professionals
- Floral Design/Greenhouse Management
- Health Occupations/Health Related Technology
- Heating, Air Conditioning, and Refrigeration (HVAC)
- Heavy Equipment Operations / Preventive Maintenance
- Landscape Construction/Environmental Design
- Marketing and Business Education
- Masonry
- Material Handling / Logistics Technology
- Painting and Decorating
- Plumbing and Heating
- Precision Machine Tool Technology
- Pre-engineering and Engineering Technology
- Print Technology / Graphic Imaging
- Small Engines/Recreational Vehicle Repair
- Web Design / Programming
- Welding Technology

== Career opportunities ==
Students enrolled at LCTI have a variety of options. One of the major components is SkillsUSA, and other national leadership competitions. There is also the National FFA Organization for the students of Landscape Construction/Environmental Design and Floral Design/Greenhouse Management.
