= Allentown School District =

School district in Pennsylvania

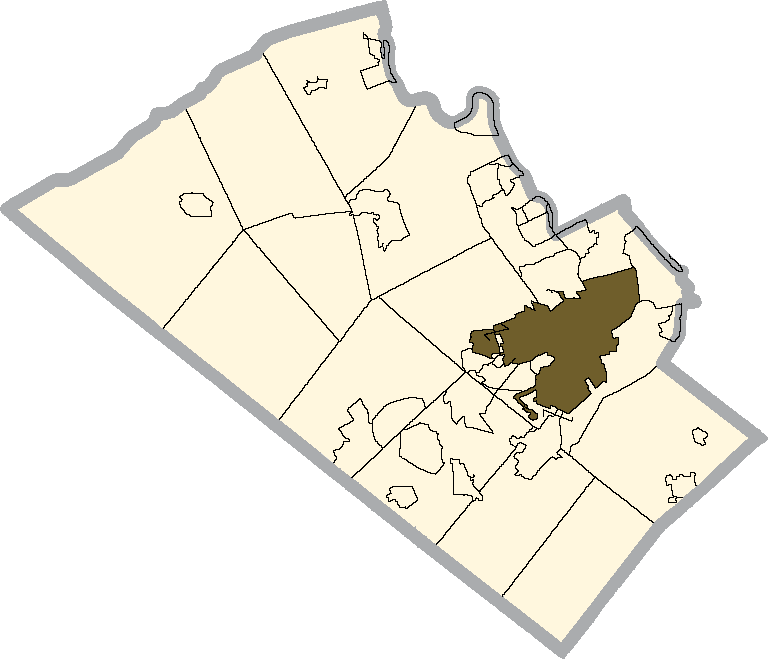
- Location of Allentown School District in Lehigh County, Pennsylvania

Address
- 31 South Penn Street Allentown, Pennsylvania, 18105; United States
- Coordinates: 40.60315°N 75.46597°W

District information
- Type: Public
- Grades: Pre-K–12
- Established: 1828; 198 years ago
- Schools: 21, including Allen High School and Dieruff High School
- Budget: $414.939 million
- NCES District ID: 4202280

Students and staff
- Students: 16,769 (2024-25)
- Teachers: 1,053.0 (on an FTE basis)
- Student–teacher ratio: 15.92
- Athletic conference: Eastern Pennsylvania Conference

Other information
- Website: www.allentownsd.org

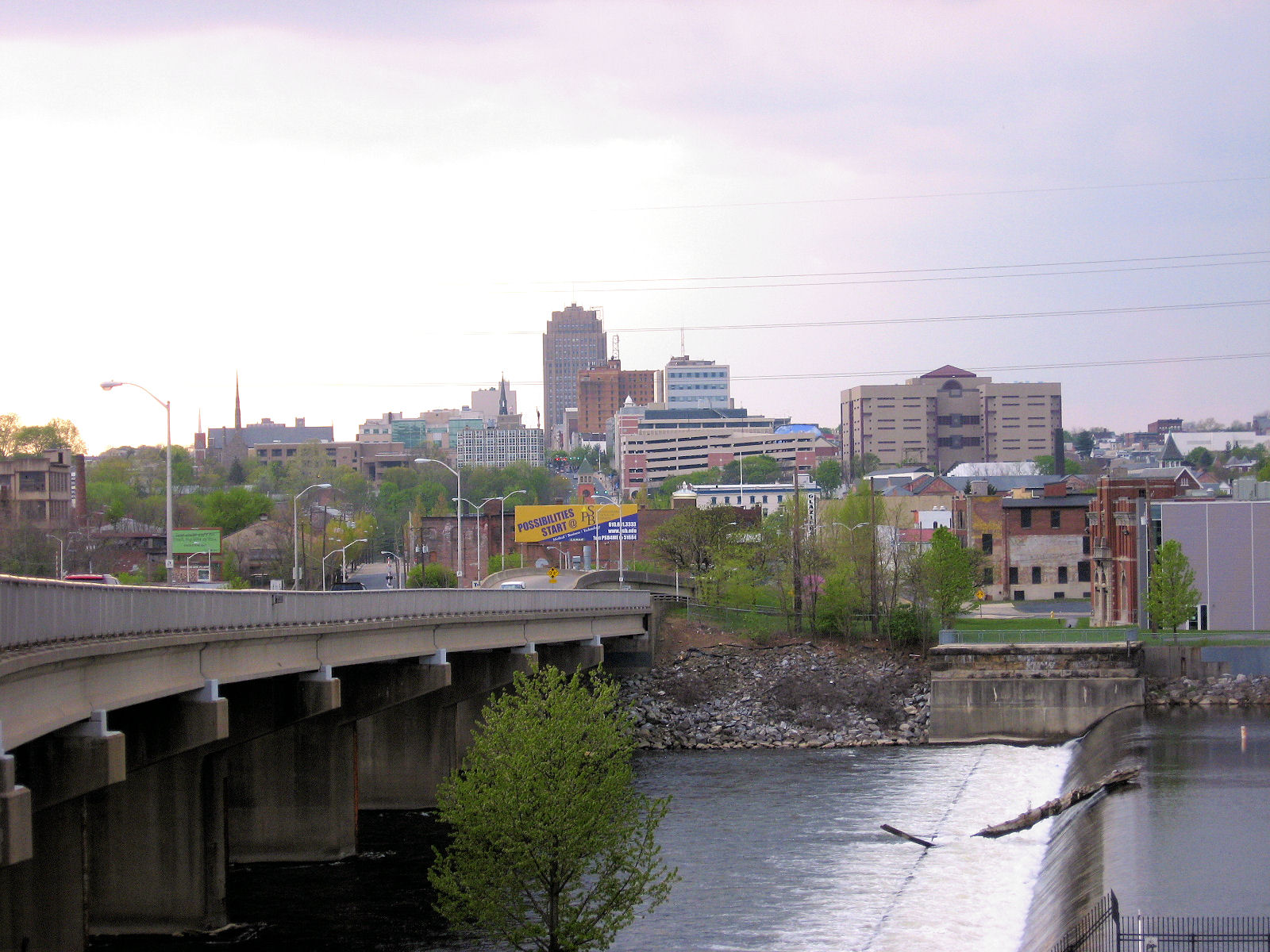
Allentown School District serves public school students in Allentown, the third-largest city in Pennsylvania and county seat of Lehigh County

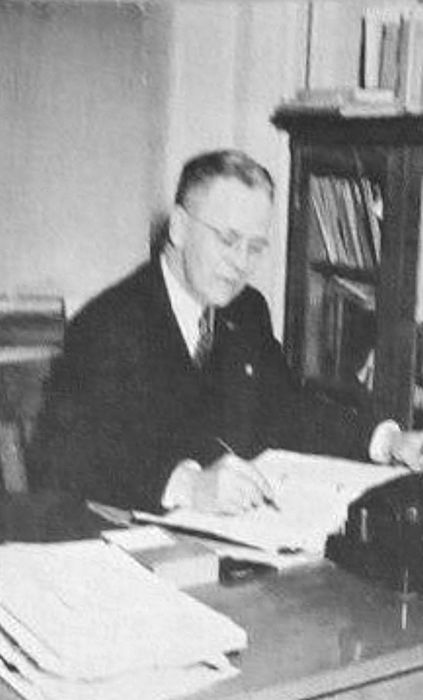
A 1948 photograph of Louis Edgar Dieruff, an Allentown School District administrator and school board member; Louis E. Dieruff High School was named for him in 1956.

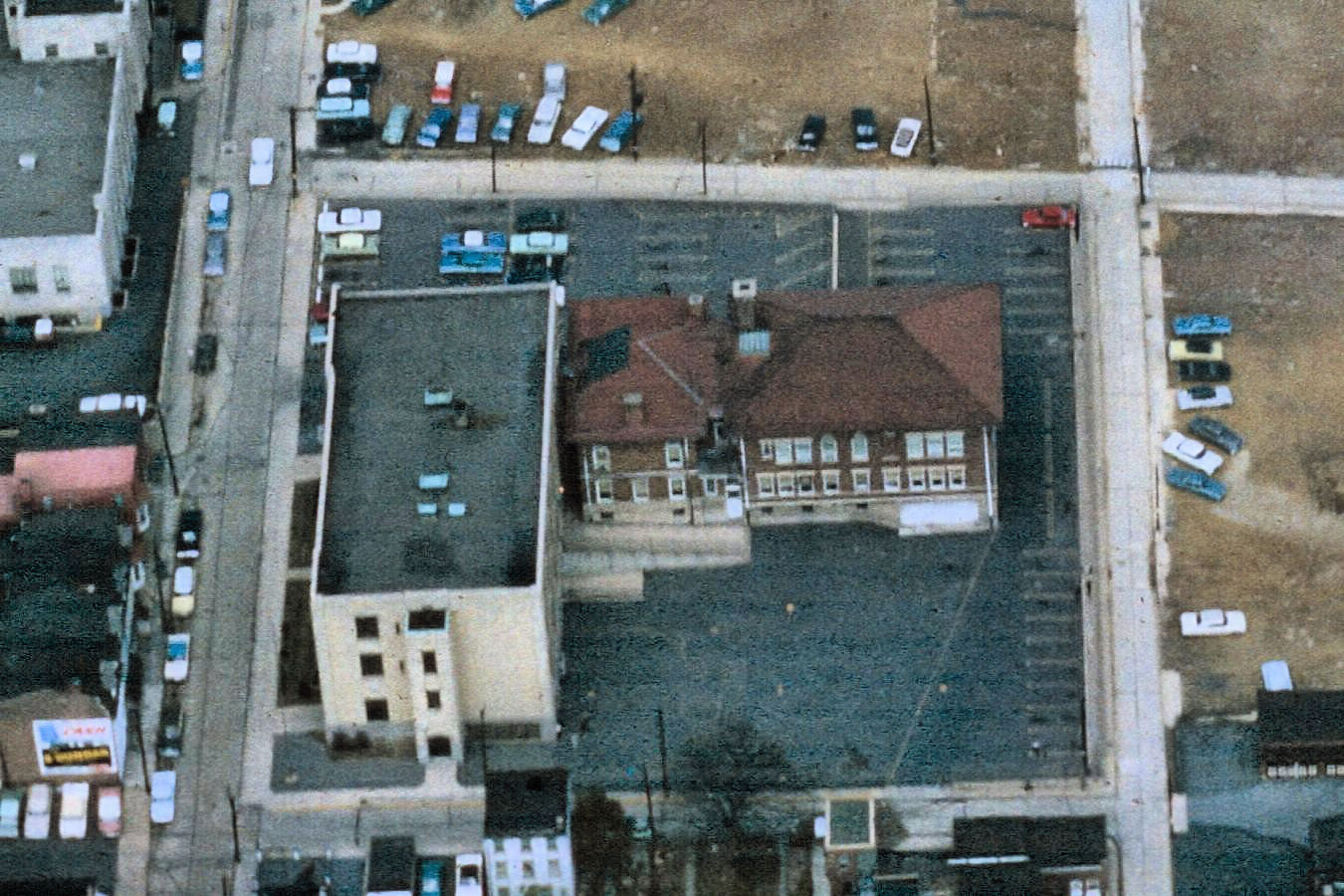
An aerial photo of Allentown School District offices in 1965

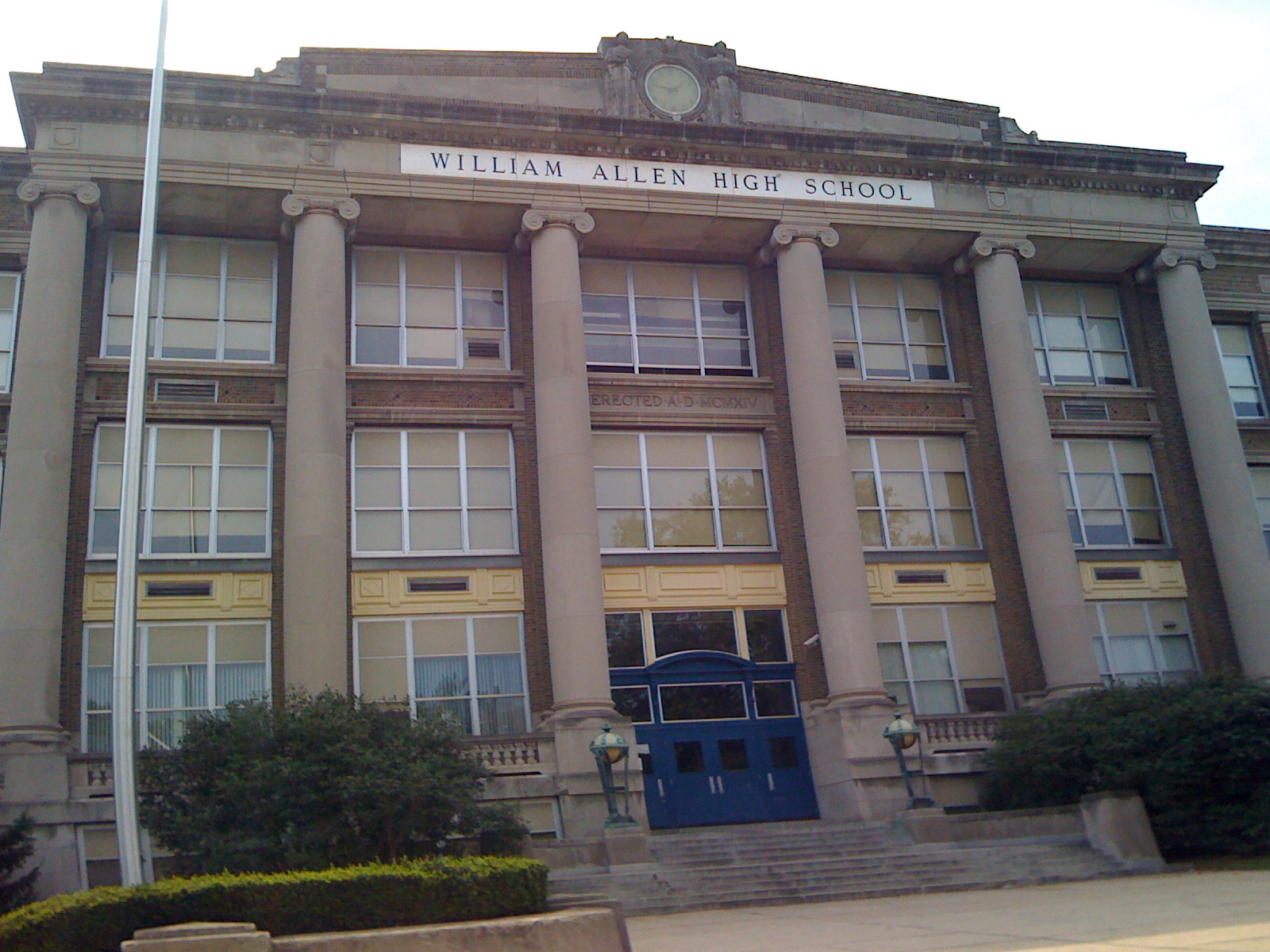
William Allen High School in 2008

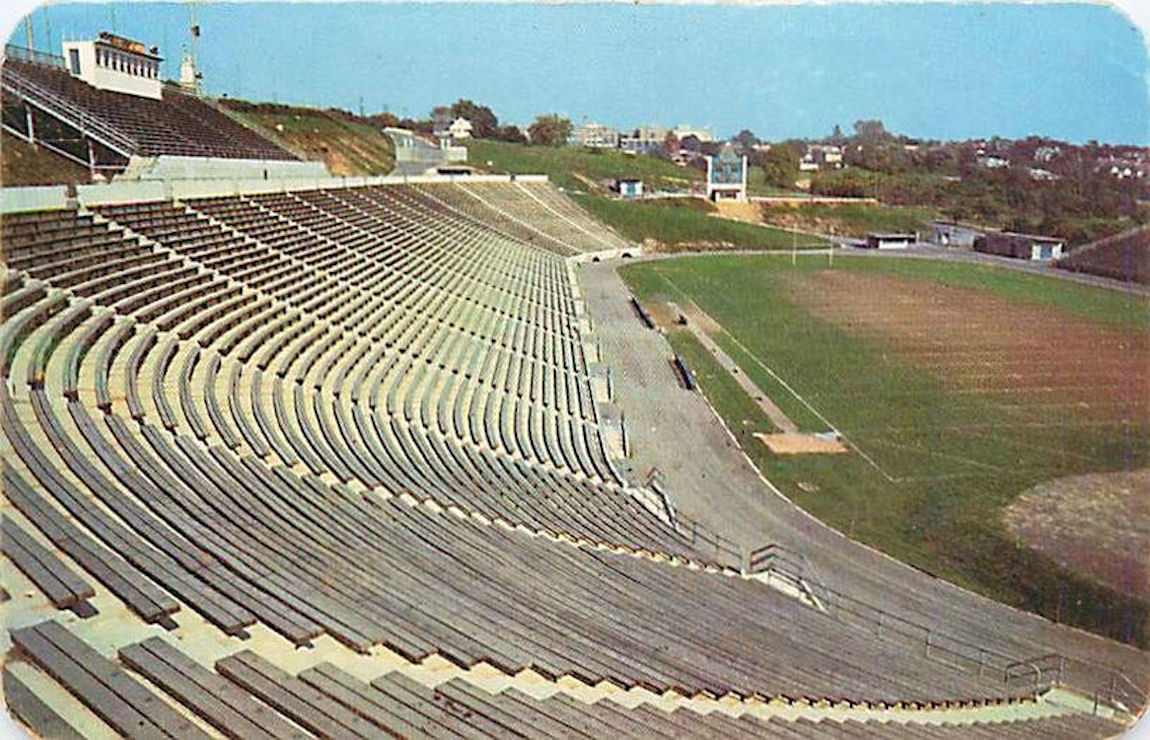
J. Birney Crum Stadium, the largest high school football stadium in the Mid-Atlantic United States and home football field for both of Allentown's large public high schools, Allen and Dieruff High Schools

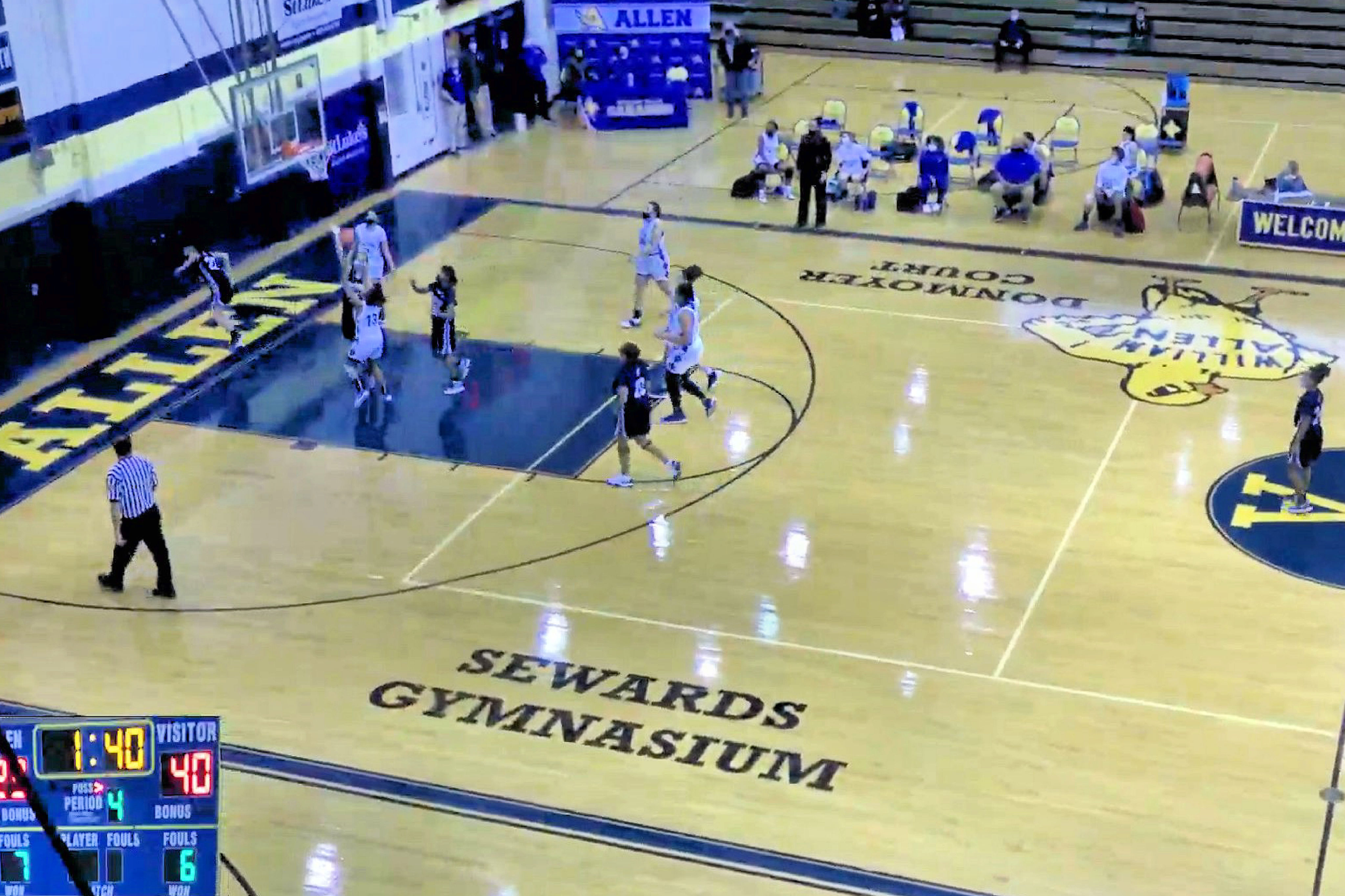
J. Milo Sewards Gymnasium at Allen High School in February 2021

The Allentown School District is a large, urban public school district located in Allentown, Pennsylvania in the Lehigh Valley region of eastern Pennsylvania. As of the 2024-25 school year, Allentown School District is the fourth-largest school district in Pennsylvania.

The school district includes two large urban public high schools, Allen High School and Dieruff High School, each based in Allentown, for ninth through 12th grades. As of the 2024-25 school year, 16,769 students attend its 23 schools, according to data released by the National Center for Education Statistics.

The school district encompasses approximately 17 square miles (44 km^{2}). As of the 2020 census, the Allentown School District serves a resident population of 125,845. In 2009, the per capita income was $16,282 and median family income was $37,356 compared to a Pennsylvania median family income of $49,501 and overall U.S. median family income of $49,445 as of the 2010 census.

The school district's demographics, as of 2016-17, are 9.9% White, 14.5% Black, 70.9% Hispanic, 1.3% Asian, and 0.2% Native American High school students in Allentown School District may choose to attend Lehigh Career and Technical Institute for vocational training.

== History ==
=== 19th century ===
==== Founding ====
The Allentown Public School District (ASD) was founded in 1828. The Commonwealth Education Act of 1824, a Pennsylvania statute, provided that children of those families unable to pay for private instruction were to be provided education at the expense of the county. Records of the borough of Northampton Towne (present day Allentown) and the townships of Salisbury reflect that $421.71 was paid for the education of children in the district in 1828. In 1833, Northampton Borough paid $434.77. Both boys and girls from families in the lower income brackets were permitted to attend any one of the approved private schools in the borough.

In 1834, the Model Public School Act was passed permitting voters to authorize formal public education for all boys and girls regardless of race or creed with voter approval. At a meeting of the citizens of Northampton on September 12, 1834, a referendum for the establishment of formalized public education in the school district was passed by the voters, 137 to 1.

During the initial period following passage of the referendum, all boys and girls of the borough attended the privately run schools in Northampton Towne. Tuition there was $10 to $20 per term per student, depending on the number of subjects taken and was paid for by the school district.

On April 16, 1836, an act of the Pennsylvania General Assembly changed the name of the community from Northampton Towne to Allentown. The first public school building began with the purchase of a tract of land for $50 at Walnut and Union Streets, along Front Street on August 30, 1837, was referred to as "Mingo School", and was designed to serve students from Allentown's east-side. The first teacher was hired in 1838. By 1841, three of the six teachers in the Allentown School District were women. In 1858, a larger school was built on Turner Street, just to the west of Eighth Street.

Until 1858, primary and secondary education was taught in the same school. That year, R. W. McAlpine took a group of 14 older students to the Garber-Horne Building, which had been the home of the North American Homeopathic School of Healing Arts at South Penn Street, near the present Allentown School District Administration Building. This was the beginning of Allentown High School. The first class was fourteen pupils, equally divided by boys and girls.

In 1859, by a vote of 6 to 2, a separate high school was established, one for boys and one for girls. It was located at the Presbyterian Sunday School. Augustus Armagnac was named teacher for the male students, and Hannah L. Romig for the female students. The first commencement was held in May 1869 in the Presbyterian Church on North 5th Street. The first graduating class was three students.

With the division between primary and secondary schools, as the city grew, a primary grammar school was erected in each ward of the borough. Each of the schools was under the supervision of the ward. In January 1866, the various ward district leaders called for a consolidation of the various schools into one school district as a central authority, this led to the formation of the unified Allentown School District. This unification also led eventually to a unified city government, and within a year, legislation was proposed in Harrisburg by Lehigh County State Senator George P. Shall to incorporate Allentown as a city.

From 1859 to 1894, secondary school classes were held separately for boys and girls. Classes for boys were held in the Leh's store building on Hamilton Street, and the girls' classes were held in the Sunday School rooms of the First Presbyterian Church on North Fifth Street. Classes were transferred to the Fourth Ward Wolf Building from 1880 to 1894. Classes were moved in 1895 to a new building built exclusively as a high school erected at the site of the "Old Central School", at Lumber and Turner streets.

=== 20th century ===
By 1913, the school became overcrowded, and five rooms of the Herbst School Building were used for the freshman class of 1918.

In 1917, the current main building at 17th and Turner streets was completed, and Allentown High School, now known as William Allen High School, was moved and consolidated into its current building. The school served ninth through 12th grades 9-12 1928.

In the 20th century, the city expanded east and west of the Lehigh River, and south into Salisbury Township south of the Little Lehigh Creek. The annexation of Bridgetown in 1911 (now the 14th Ward), and Rittersville in 1920 (now the 15th Ward) expanded the city east to its current boundary with Bethlehem along Club Avenue. In East Allentown, the Moser Elementary School opened in 1917, Ritter Elementary in 1925 and the Midway Manor 1947.

In 1907, the 12th Ward was established on land south of the Little Lehigh Creek. Jefferson Elementary began as a one-room brick schoolhouse built by the Salisbury Township School District in 1858 on the north side of Auburn Street. In 1910 it was replaced by a two-story ten-room brick building and adjacent playground at the intersection of South 8th Street and St. John Street to accommodate the students in South Allentown. The establishment of the 16th Ward along Susquehanna Street in what was called Aineyville in 1920 led to the district taking over Roosevelt Elementary which was built in 1910 by Salisbury.

In 1922, the 17th Ward was created and the western boundary of the city was expanded to what is now Cedar Crest Boulevard from 17th Street. At the time there were no houses west of 22d Street and all students went to Jackson Elementary at 15th and Liberty Street, built in 1911. A new school, Muhlenberg, was built on 21st Street in 1928 to accommodate this western growth. Muhlenberg was supposed to be a junior high school, but the population increased too quickly and it was designated an elementary school.

A third level of schools, junior high schools, which were later designated as the present-day middle schools in the district, were established in 1925 for grades six, seven, and eight. The Central School building, which was used as Allentown High School from 1893 to 1916 was renovated and expanded with two additional buildings and was converted to a junior high school. Francis D. Raub Elementary School opened in 1923 in the west end of the city. In 1925, it was also converted. In the 1st Ward, the Harrison grammar school for boys and the Morton grammar school for girls was consolidated, establishing Harrison-Morton Junior High School in 1927. Beginning in the 1929-1930 school year, the junior high schools began teaching 7th though 9th grades with the adoption of the 6-3-3 plan, and Allentown High School taught 10th though 12th grades.

1n 1929, Jack Coffield Stadium for interscholastic football was opened directly behind the main building of Allentown High School. Interscholastic football had begun in 1896 with the team playing on any open field that was available. In 1930. the Annex, the Little Palestra for the basketball team, and the famous tunnel were added to Allentown High School, which provided an indoor connection with the main building. Coffield Stadium was replaced by the larger Allentown School District Stadium in 1948. In 1958, the Linden Street Annex was constructed and the vocational students from the Nineteenth Street and Hunsicker Buildings were again brought back to the main campus. In 1940, half-day Kindergarten classes were added to the primary schools. In 1970, these were expanded to full-day classes.

After World War II, the expansion of the 12th Ward to include the wartime Convair Field and the wartime housing built for its workers led to the construction of Lehigh Parkway school in 1949. Students had previously attended school in homes. The 19th Ward acquired the land southwest of Lehigh Street in 1949, including Mountainville, leading to the construction of a fourth junior high school, South Mountain, in 1951, and the Hiram Dodd Elementary School in 1956.

As Allentown grew, a second high school was needed. In May 1929, the Allentown School District paid $51,000 for a large tract of land at Irving and East Washington Streets in East Allentown. The land was purchased for a new junior high school to accommodate students east of the Lehigh River. In 1951, the Chew Street wing of Central was torn down and replaced by a playground.

On May 21, 1956, ground was broken for the new Louis E. Dieruff High School named in honor of the educator and administrator who had given 44 years of service to the district. The school opened in September 1959, and Allentown High School's name was changed to William Allen High School the following year, in 1960.

A major realignment of the junior high school boundaries occurred for the 1967-1968 school year with the closure of Central and the opening of the new Trexler Junior High School. At the same time, Central became a citywide sixth grade center with the primary grammar schools being realigned for kindergarten through 5th grade. All sixth grade students in ASD were sent to Central. In December 1967, Central suffered a massive fire and the oldest part of the building, built in 1893 as Allentown High School, was completely gutted. It was replaced with a new wing by 1969. In 1973, the William Allen High School physical education facility was opened on the site of the former Coffied football Field, replacing the Little Plaestra gym and swimming pool. In 1975, a library-science center was built on the site of the Little Palestra.

Beginning in the 1981-1982 school year, the middle school concept was adopted by Allentown School District. Central was realigned to become a kindergarten through fifth grade elementary school. Harrison-Morton, Raub, South Mountain and Trexler were renamed middle schools for grades six through eight. William Allen and Dieruff High Schools, in turn, reintroduced the freshmen (9th grade) class and became four-year high schools.

=== 21st century ===
In the early 2000s, Allentown School District built three new facilities: the Luis A. Ramos Elementary School, the first new elementary school in the ASD in over 50 years, the Clifford S. Bartholomew Building at William Allen High School, and the Michael P. Mellinger Wing at Louis E. Dieruff High School.

- Luis A. Ramos Elementary School accommodates 750 students, 40 classrooms, a cafeteria, library and other facilities. It replaced the Jackson Elementary School which was built in 1911.
- Clifford S. Bartholomew Building replaced the old St. Cloud Street building, along with an open field that had been the site of the Mack and Farr buildings, torn down in 1973. In addition, the main William Allen HS building was upgraded with the addition of two new dance studios, renovation to art rooms, the gym and the Black Box Theater.
- Louis E. Dieruff High School's Michael P. Mellinger Wing includes 24 additional classrooms, a separate entrance and security system, a nurse's suite, a media center, cafeteria, and physical education space, lockers and classrooms.

The Allentown School District Virtual Academy was established in 2014, providing virtual online classes, along with a full-time cyber school. The ASD Newcomer Academy, established in 2011, provides classes in Spanish for students from 8th-12th grade who are learning English as a second language.

In fall 2015, Allentown School District opened Building 21. According to the district website, the school aims to help students develop real-world skills through various elective courses concentrated on different career paths such as medicine and media.

== Extracurriculars ==
The Allentown School District offers a wide variety of clubs, activities and an extensive athletic program at each high school and middle school. Both Allentown School District public high schools, William Allen High School and Louis E. Dieruff High School, compete athletically in the East Penn Conference.

=== Interscholastic sports ===
==== High school ====
Both of Allentown's public high schools, William Allen High School and Louis E. Dieruff High School, compete in the East Penn Conference in District XI of the Pennsylvania Interscholastic Athletic Association (PIAA).

Coaches receive compensation as outlined in the teachers' union contract. When athletic competition exceeds the regular season, additional compensation is paid.

Varsity athletic sports in the district include:

Boys'

- Baseball - AAAA
- Basketball- AAAA
- Cross country - AAA
- Football - AAAA
- Golf - AAA
- Lacrosse - AAAA
- Soccer - AAA
- Swimming and diving - AAA
- Tennis - AAA
- Track and Field - AAA
- Volleyball - AAA
- Wrestling - AAA

Girls'

- Basketball - AAAA
- Cheer - AAAA
- Cross country - AAA
- Field hockey - AAA
- Golf - AAA
- Soccer (Fall) - AAA
- Softball - AAAA
- Swimming and diving - AAA
- Girls' tennis - AAA
- Track and field - AAA
- Volleyball - AAA

==== Middle school ====
The ASD Middle Schools offer the following team sports:

- Harrison-Morton (Minute Men)
- Raub (Ravens)
- Trexler (Bulldogs)
- South Mountain (Mountaineers)

Fall sports:

- Field hockey (girls')
- Football (boys')
- Cross country (boys'/girls')
- Volleyball (girls')

Winter sports:

- Boys' basketball
- Girls' basketball

Spring sports:

- Softball (girls')
- Soccer (boys'/girls')
- Swimming and diving (boys'/girls')
- Volleyball (boys')

According to PIAA directory, July 2013

== Schools ==
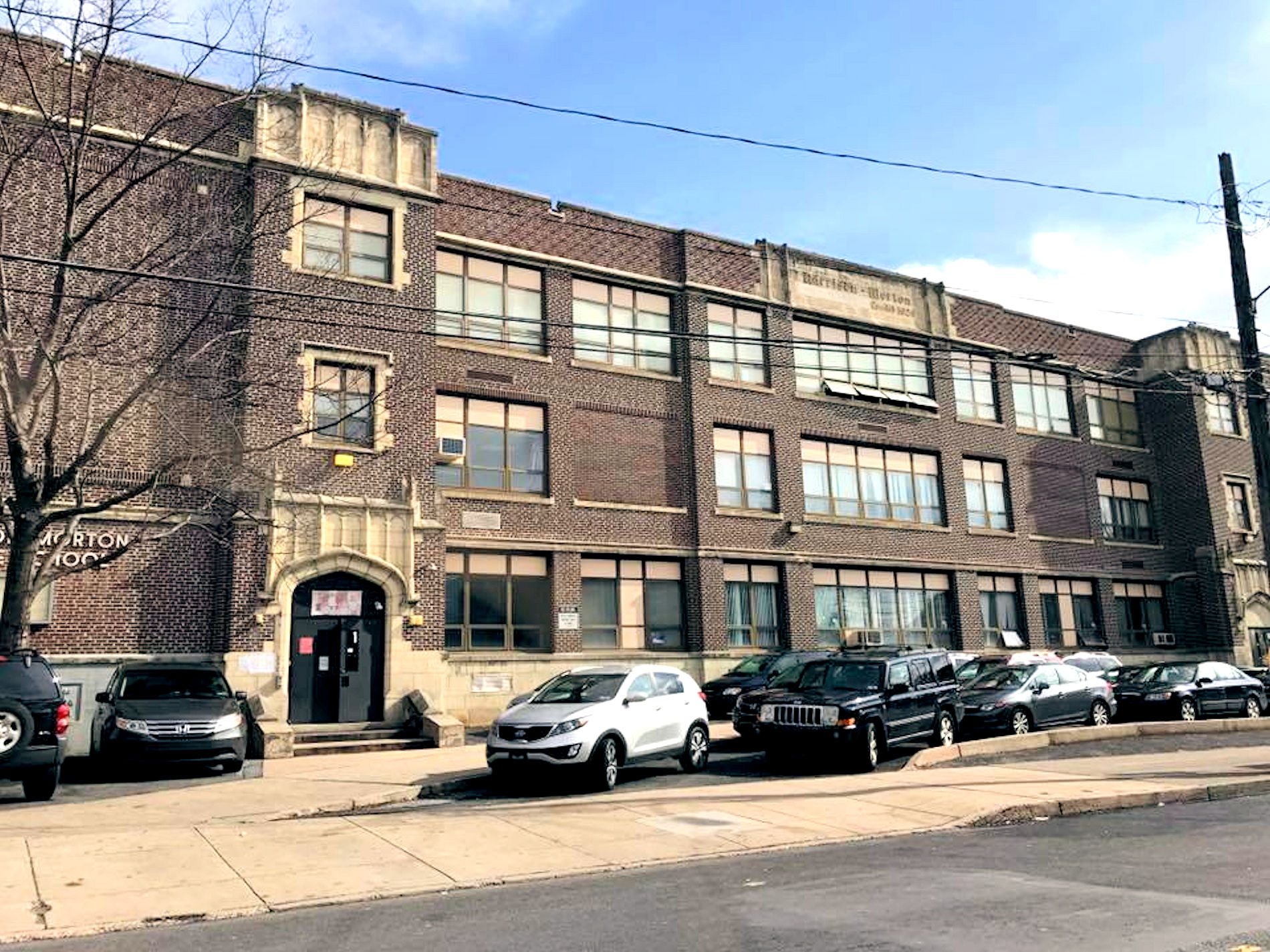
Harrison-Morton Middle School at 137 N. 2nd Street in May 2018

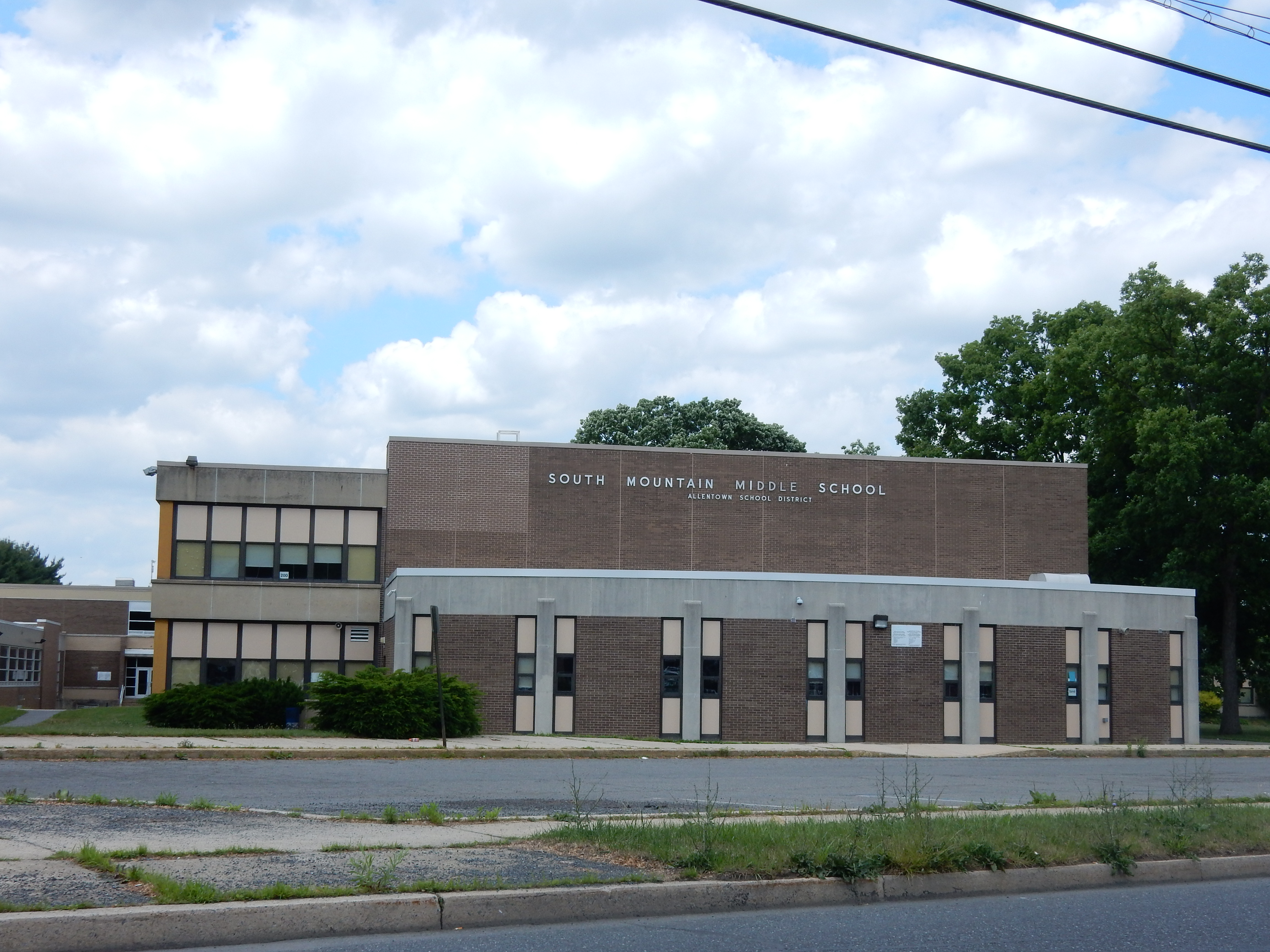
South Mountain Middle School at 709 W. Emaus Avenue in June 2015

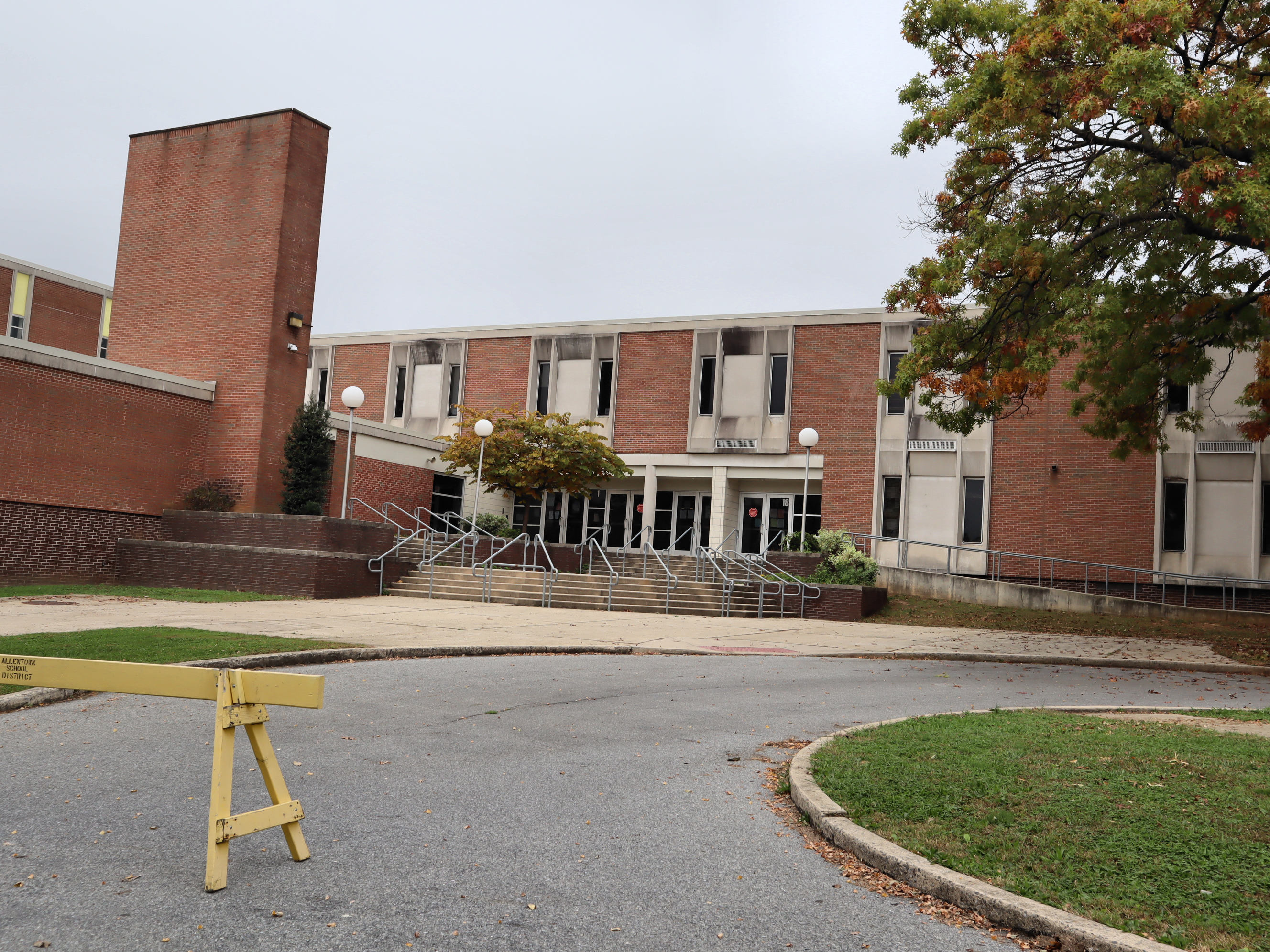
Trexler Middle School at 851 N. 15th Street in October 2020

=== High schools ===
- William Allen High School
  106 N. 17th Street
  Map location: 40°35′54″N 075°29′39″W
  Established 1858. Current building erected 1916, Renovations and additions made in 1930, 1942, 1956, 1972, 1979, 1980, 1992, and 2010
- Louis E. Dieruff High School
  815 N. Irving Street
  Map location: 40°37′17″N 075°26′28″W
  Erected 1959. Renovations and additions made in 1964, 1975, and 2010
- Bridgeview Academy
  265 Lehigh Street
  Map location: 40°35′57″N 075°25′04″W
  Opened in 2015 as Building 21 Allentown, an experimental high school focused on career development. Renamed Bridgeview Academy of Health, Science, Innovation, and Technology in 2025.

=== Middle schools ===
- Francis D. Raub Middle School
  102 S. St. Cloud Street
  Map location: 40°35′39″N 075°29′35″W
  Established in 1925, named for Francis D. Raub, superintendent of schools in Allentown from 1893 to 1916. Renovations/additions: 1931, 1965.
- Harrison-Morton Middle School
  137 N. 2nd Street
  Map location: 40°36′29″N 075°27′37″W
  Established in 1927 from merger of Harrison Grammar School for Boys and Morton Grammar School for Girls. Named for U.S. President Benjamin Harrison and Dr. J.R. Morton, who served on the school board from 1889 to 1910.
- South Mountain Middle School
  709 W. Emaus Avenue
  Map location: 40°34′33″N 075°27′41″W
  Established 1951. Renovations/additions: 1966, 2010
- Trexler Middle School
  851 N. 15th Street
  Map location: 40°36′37″N 075°29′35″W
  Established 1967. Named in honor of General Harry Clay Trexler, best known for his military, agricultural, industrial and philanthropic achievements.

=== Elementary schools ===
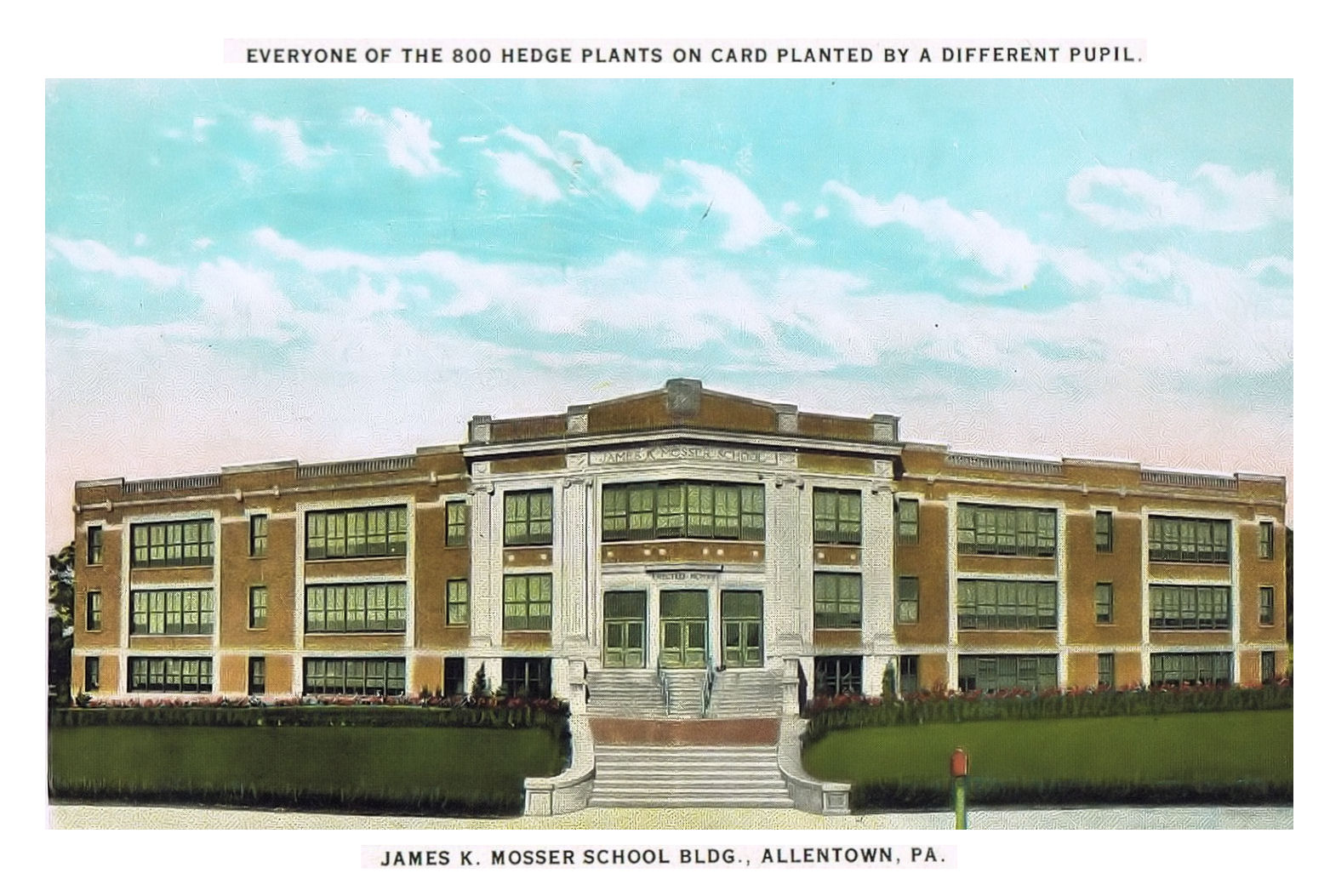
Mosser Elementary School at 129 S. Dauphin Street as depicted on a postcard in 1920.

- Brigadier General Anna Mae Hays Elementary School (2021)
  1227-1243 W Gordon St
  Map location: 40°36′22″N 075°28′50″W
  Opened in 2021 following the COVID-19 Pandemic. Replaced Cleveland Elementary School and McKinley Elementary School.
- Central Elementary School (1925)
  829 W. Turner Street
  Map location: 40°36′16″N 075°28′34″W
- Hiram Dodd Elementary School (1956)
  1944 S. Church Street
  Map location: 40°34′34″N 075°27′39″W
  Co-located with South Mountain Middle School
- Jefferson Elementary School (1910)
  750 St. John Street
  Map location: 40°35′28″N 075°28′06″W
- Lehigh Parkway Elementary School (1949)
  1708 Coronado Street
  Map location: 40°34′35″N 075°29′04″W
- Luis A. Ramos Elementary School (2010)
  1430 W. Allen Street
  Map location: 40°36′21″N 075°29′27″W
  Replaced Jackson Elementary School. Luis A. Ramos Elementary School was named in honor of a former Pennsylvania Board of Education member and chairperson of Allentown School District's Empowerment Team in 2001.
- Mosser Elementary School (1917)
  129 S. Dauphin Street
  Map location: 40°36′29″N 075°26′42″W
- Muhlenberg Elementary School (1928)
  740 N. 21st Street
  Map location: 40°36′18″N 075°30′22″W
- Ritter Elementary School (1925)
  790 N. Plymouth Street
  Map location: 40°37′16″N 075°25′57″W
- Roosevelt Elementary School (1910)
  210 W. Susquehanna Street
  Map location: 40°35′22″N 075°27′22″W
- Sheridan Elementary School (1870, new building 1985)
  521 N. 2nd Street
  Map location: 40°36′47″N 075°27′46″W
- Union Terrace Elementary School (1955)
  1939 W. Union Street
  Map location: 40°35′36″N 075°29′44″W
- Washington Elementary School (1884, new building 1981)
  837 N. 9th Street
  Map location: 40°36′49″N 075°28′51″W

=== Specialized facilities ===
- Lincoln Early Childhood Center (1900, new building 1960)
  1402 Walnut Street
  Map location: 40°35′47″N 075°29′07″W
  Formerly Lincoln Elementary School, the center employs 18 teachers and 17 non teaching staff.
- Newcomer Academy (1947, re-purposed, 2011)
  2020 E. Pennsylvania Street
  Map location: 40°37′46″N 075°25′33″W
  Established at Midway Manor Elementary School in 1947. Provides classes in Spanish for students from 8-12th grade who are learning English as a second language.
- Allentown School District Virtual Academy (2014)
  Provides virtual online classes (grades 8-12), along with a full-time cyber school

== Public charter schools ==
Allentown School Board must approve and supervise local public charter schools which operate within its attendance area. The board has approved several charter schools including: Roberto Clemente Charter School and Lincoln Leadership Academy Charter School.

In fall 2013, several entities applied to the board for approval to operate charter schools in the Allentown School District, including: Executive Education Academy Charter School, Arts Academy Elementary Charter School, Computer Aid Inc. Learning Academy Charter School and LVenture Charter School. In Pennsylvania, students may also choose to attend a public cyber charter school, which are supervised by the Pennsylvania Department of Education and open to all students in Pennsylvania.

== Libraries ==
The school district also includes the Allentown Public Library.
