= Lehigh Valley Zoo =

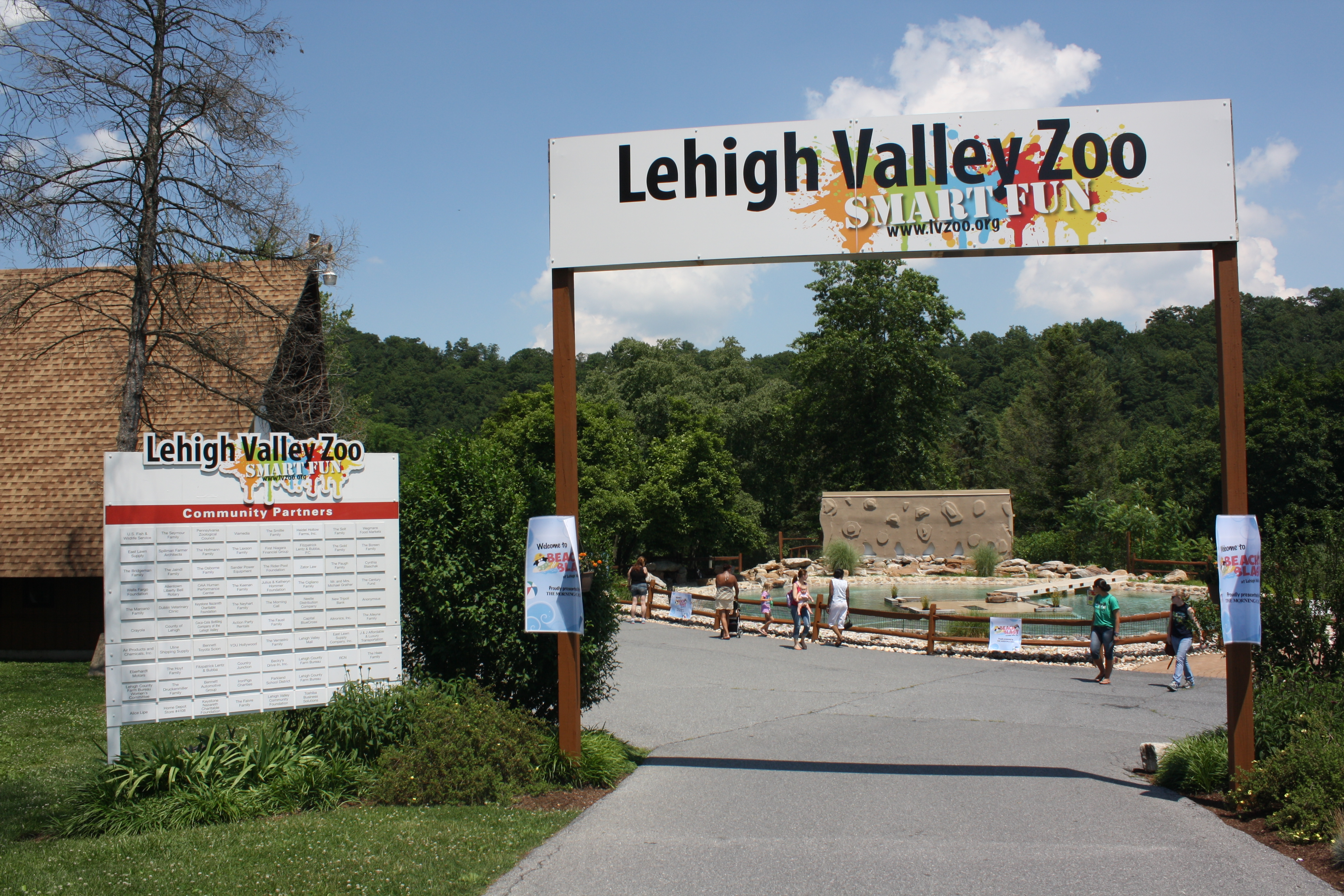
- Entrance to the Lehigh Valley Zoo in June 2013
- Interactive map of Lehigh Valley Zoo
- 40.658251°N 75.625956°W
- Date opened: 1974
- Location: Schnecksville, Pennsylvania, U.S.
- Land area: 29 acres (11.7 ha)
- No. of animals: 275
- No. of species: 70
- Annual visitors: 100,000 + 30,000 students (2011)
- Memberships: AZA
- Website: www.lvzoo.org

The Lehigh Valley Zoo is a 29-acre (11.7 ha) zoo located in Schnecksville in the Lehigh Valley region of eastern Pennsylvania. It is located inside the 1,100-acre (445 ha) Trexler Nature Preserve. The zoo is open year-round.

Lehigh Valley Zoo has been accredited by the Association of Zoos and Aquariums (AZA) since March 2006.

== History ==
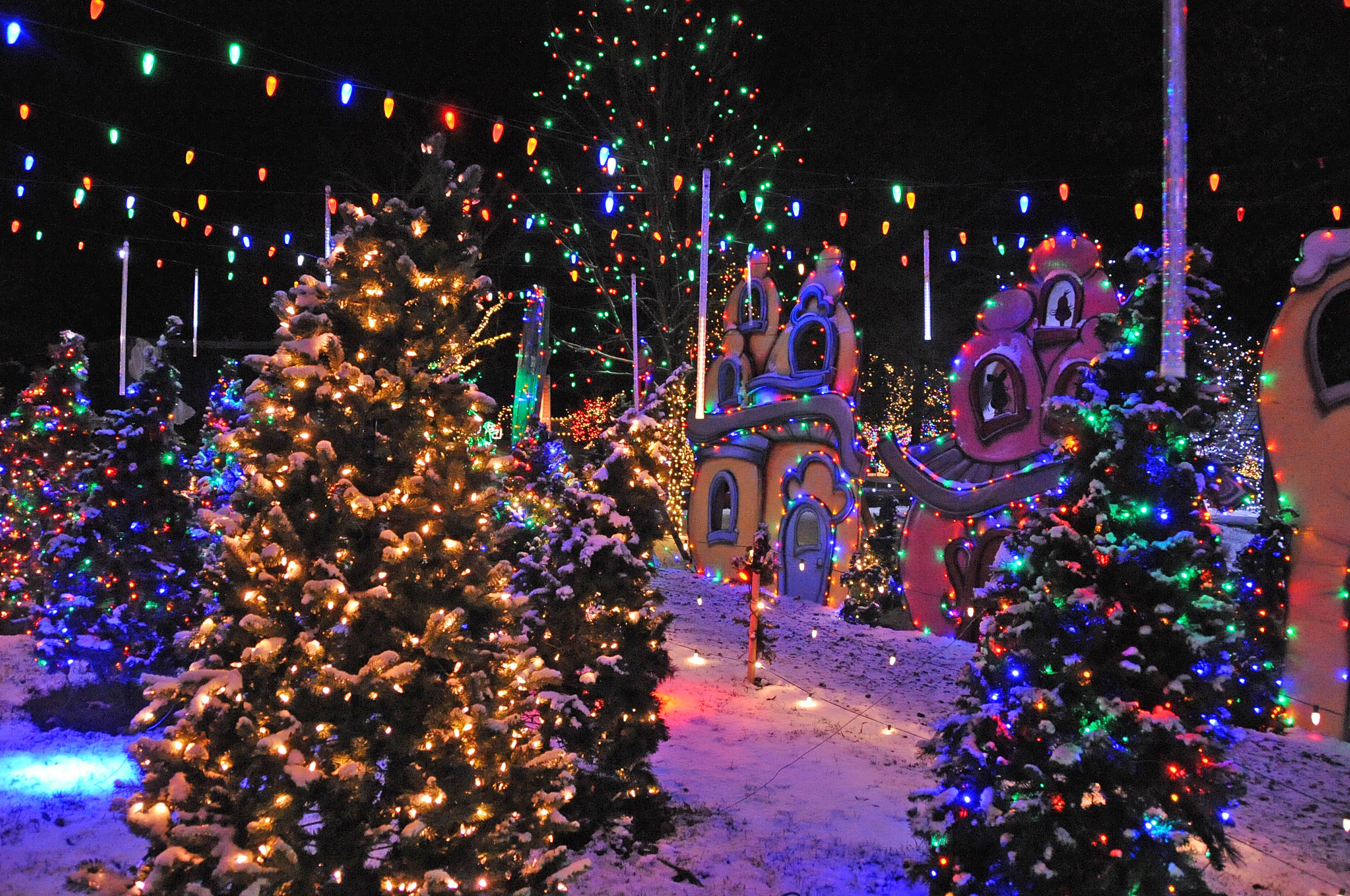
Christmas lights at Lehigh Valley Zoo in Schnecksville in December 2020

In 1906, Harry Clay Trexler started purchasing farms in Lowhill and North Whitehall townships to create a preserve to help protect bison, elk, and white-tailed deer. He purchased a total of 36 farms comprising 1,108 acres (448 ha) before he died, and then bequeathed the land to Lehigh County. In 1935, the area officially became the Trexler-Lehigh County Game Preserve.

Construction on the children's zoo in the park began in 1974. When it opened, the zoo included petting and feeding exhibits and exotic animals from Africa, Asia, and Australia.

In 2004, with the original purpose of saving native species accomplished, the county opened the entire preserve to the public. At the same time, the Lehigh Valley Zoological Society took over management of the zoo within the park.

== Conservation ==
In 2009, the zoo was participating in three Species Survival Plans (SSP): African penguin, mongoose lemur, and scimitar-horned oryx.

== Gallery ==
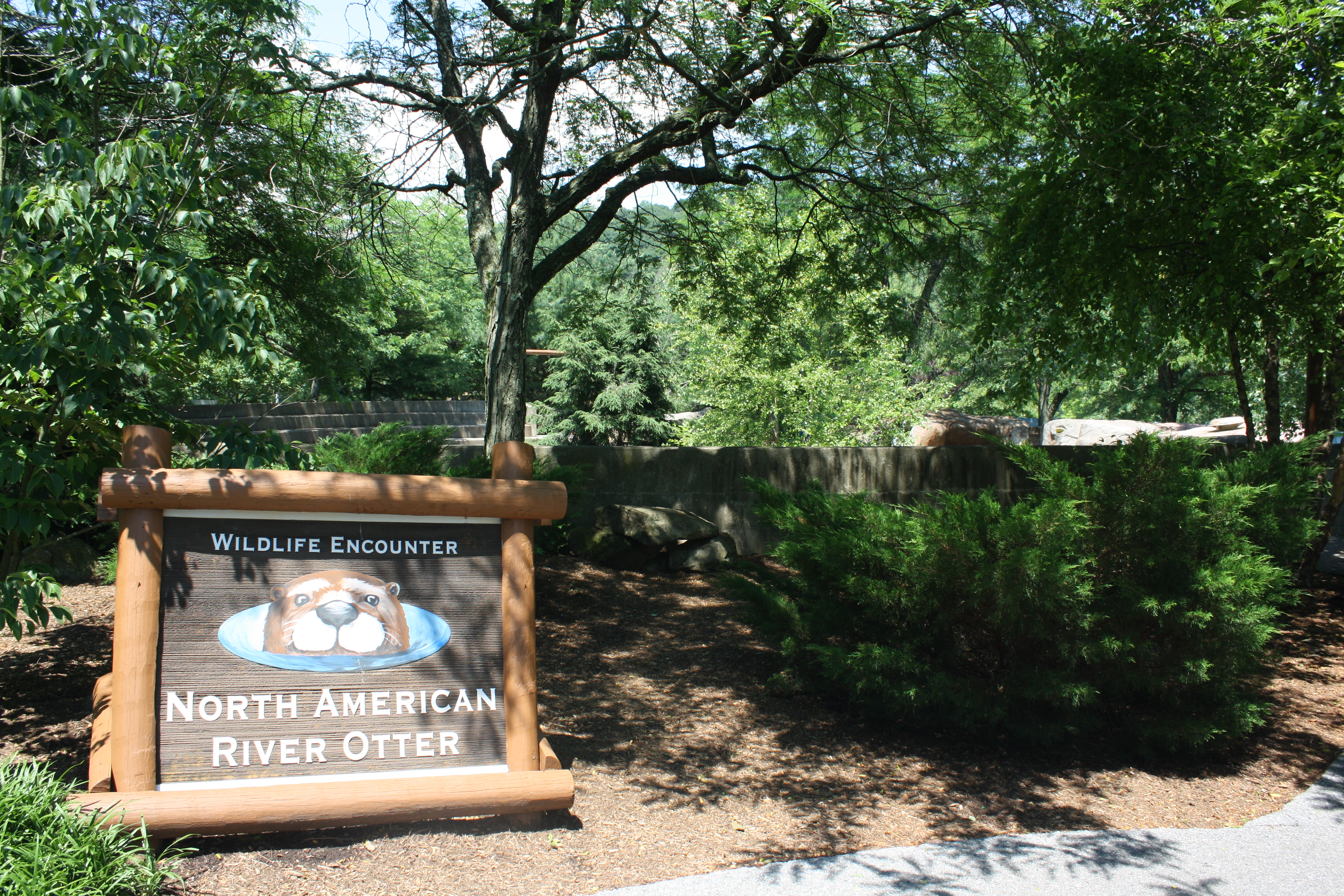

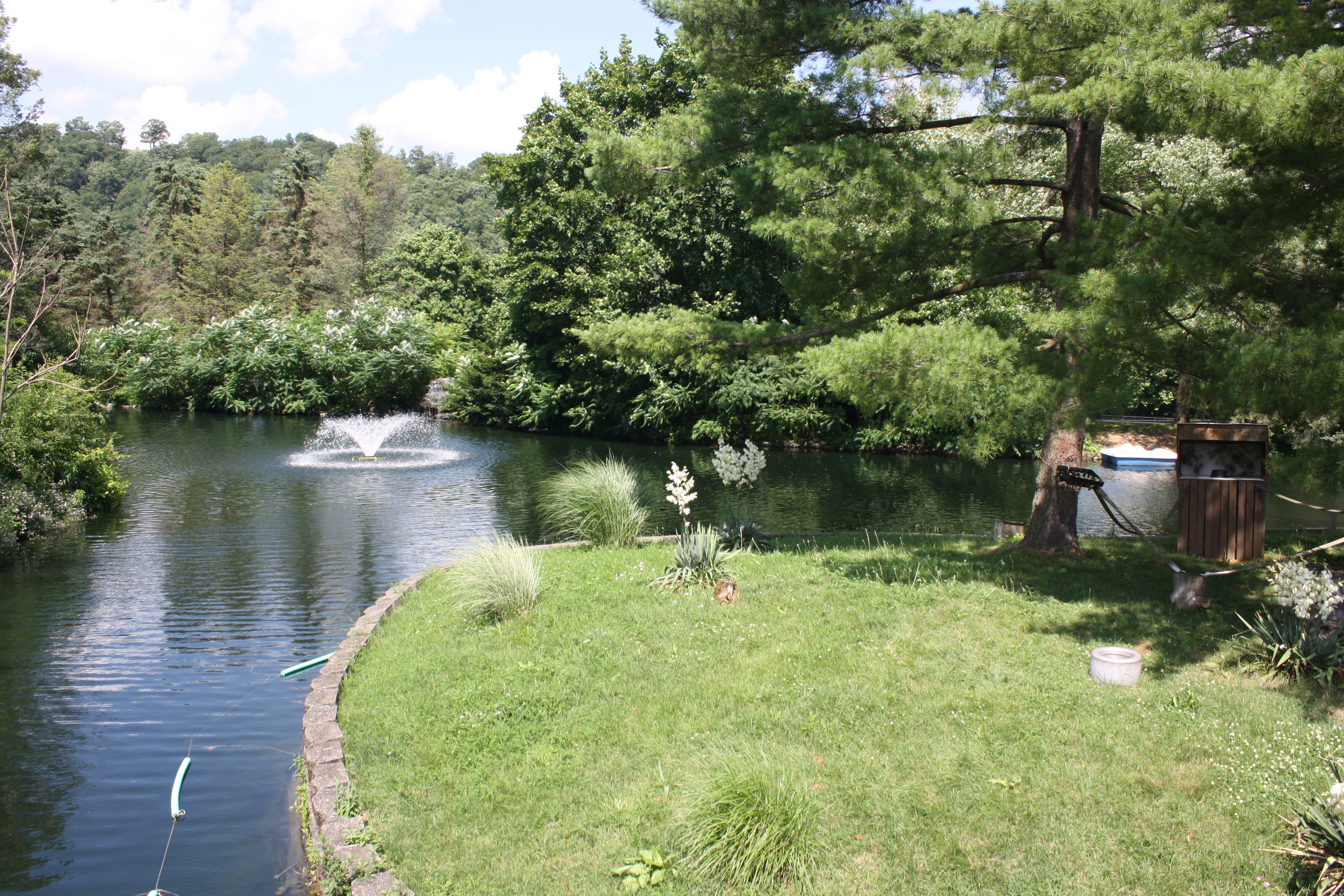

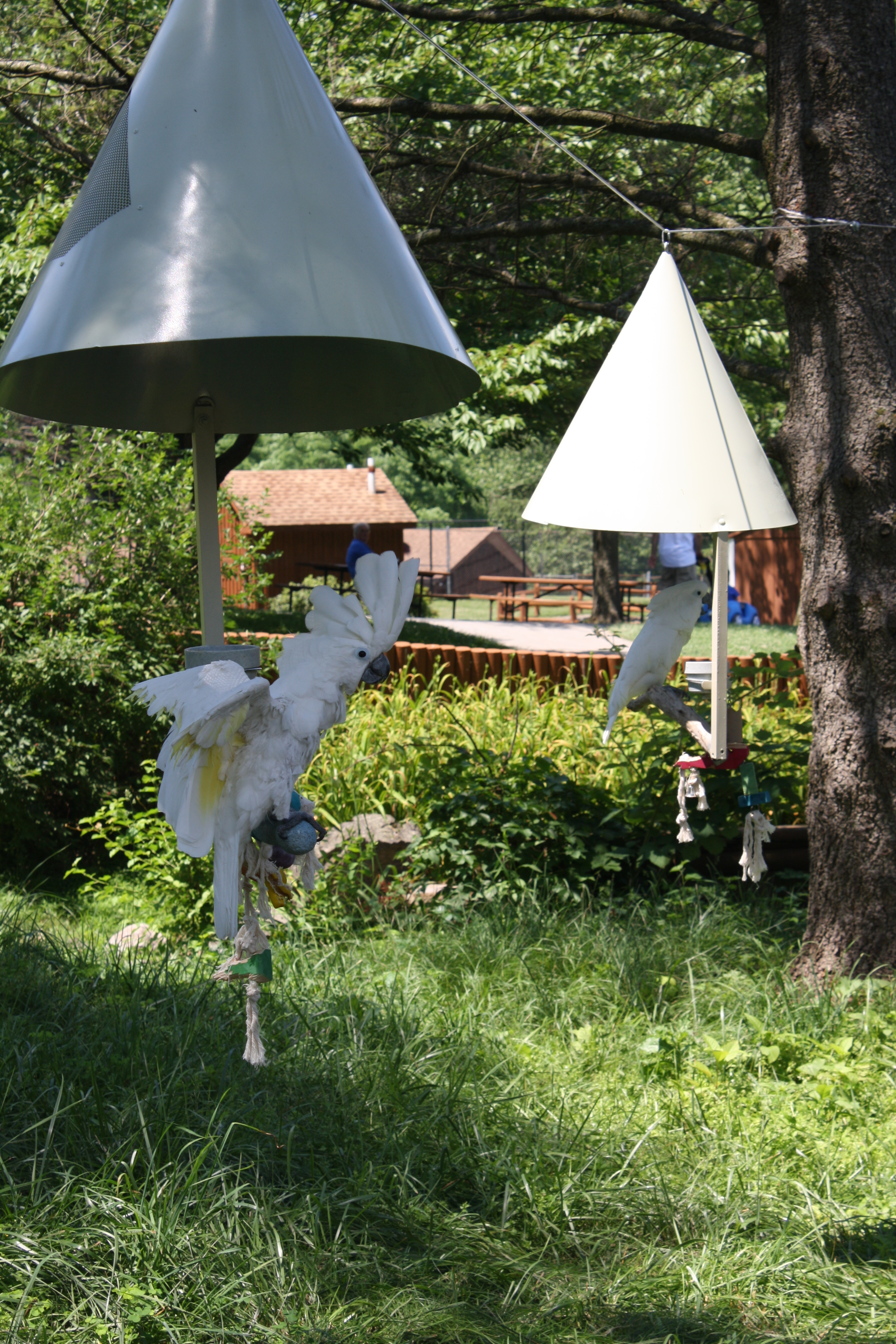

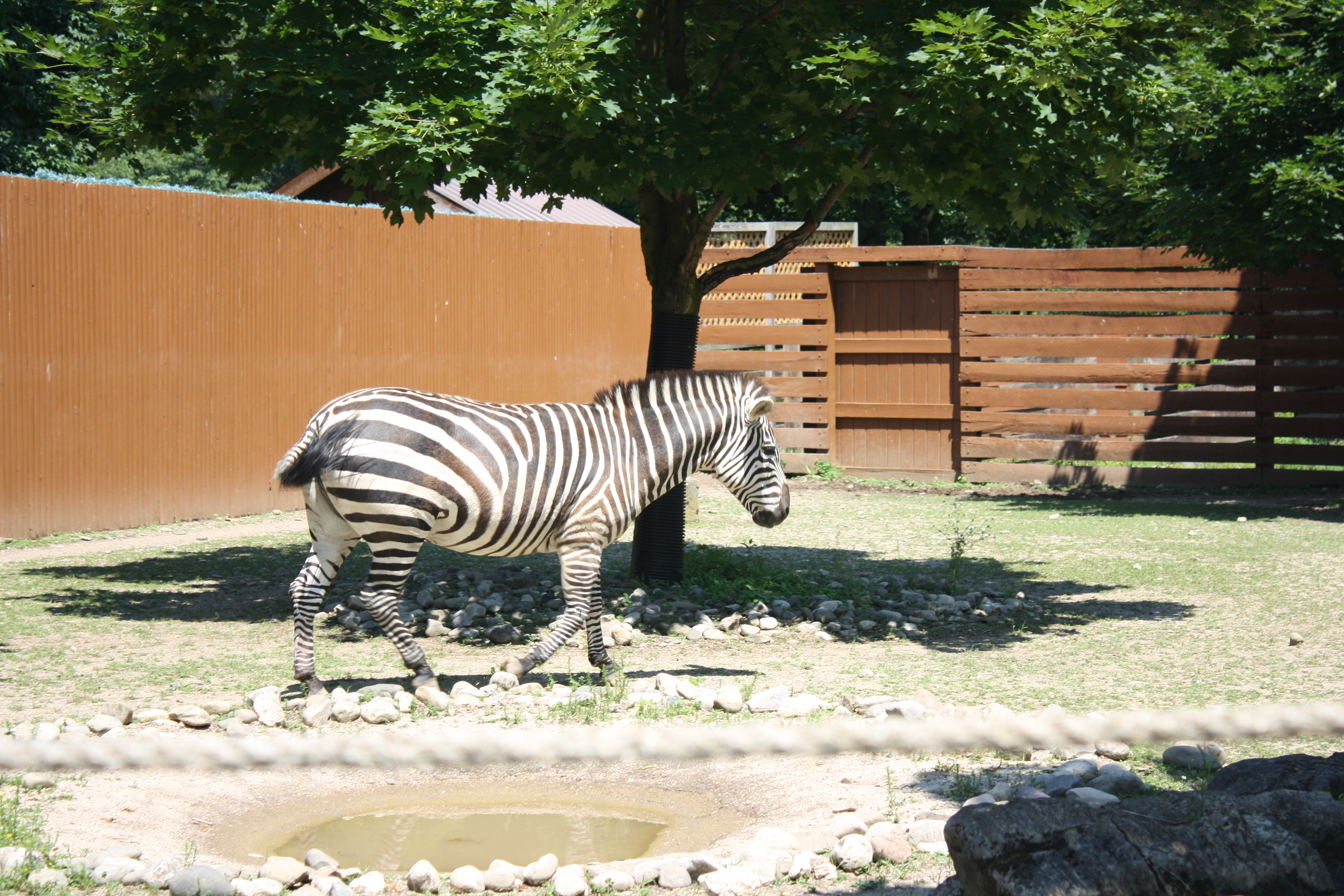
Grant's zebra

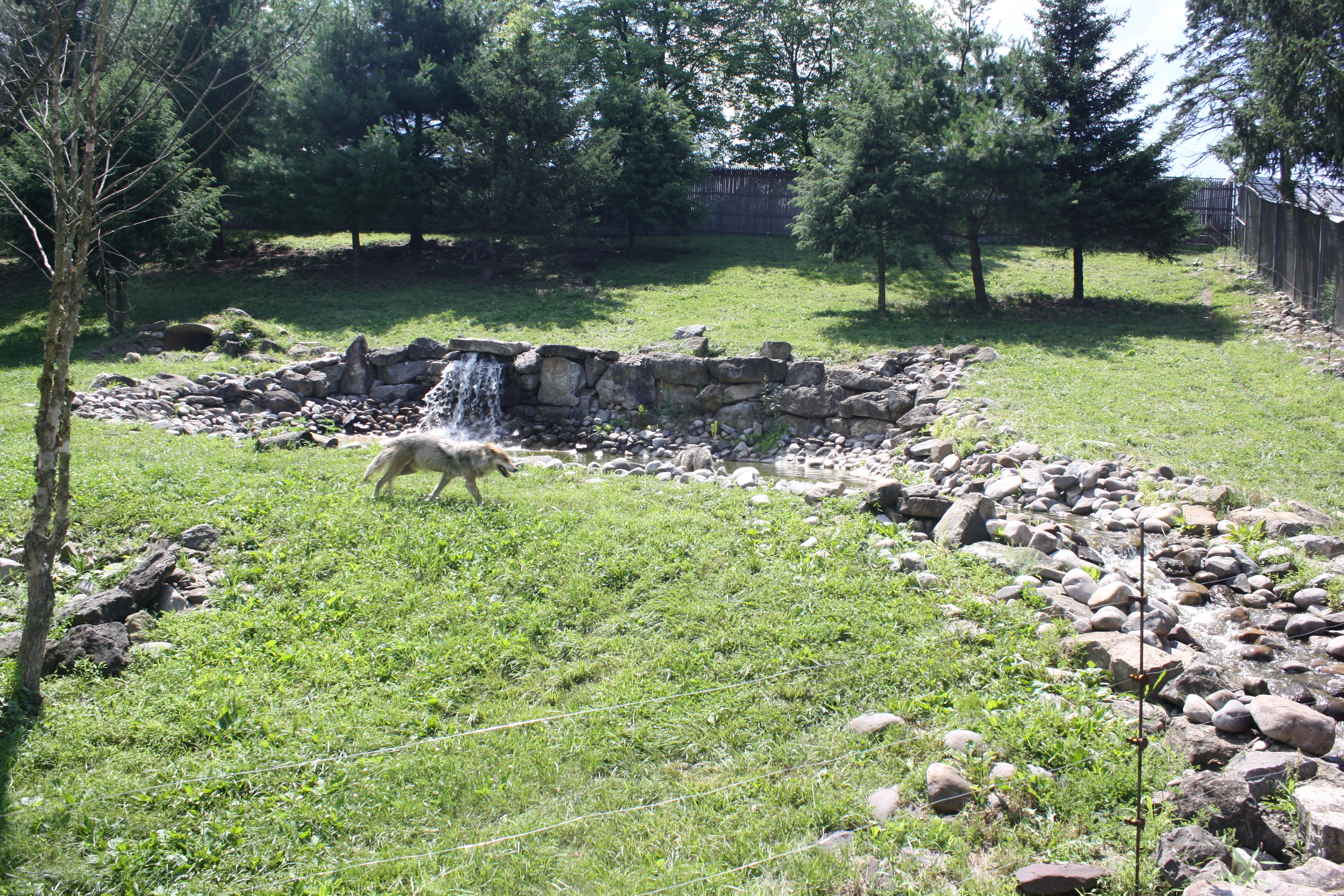
Mexican wolf

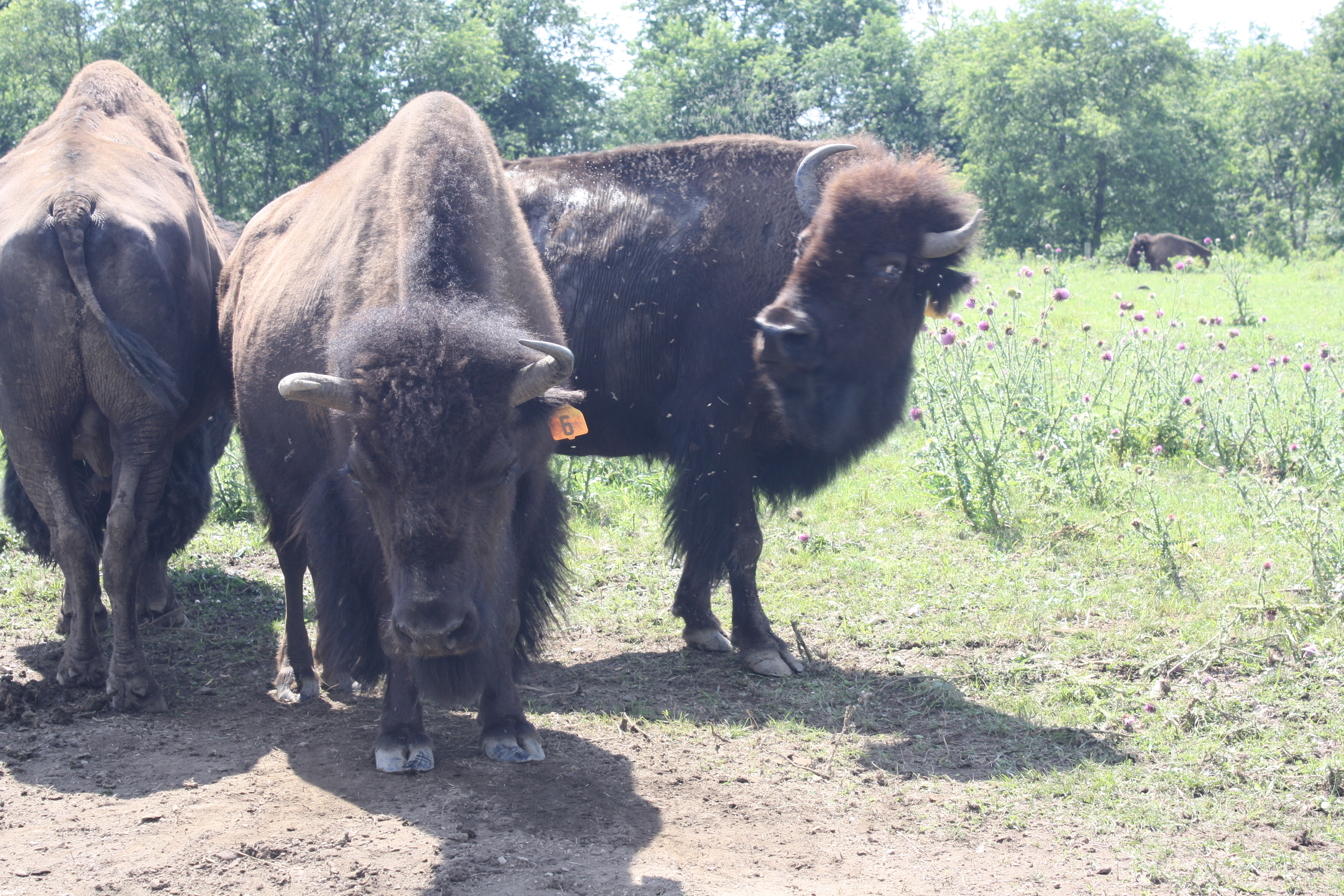
American bison
