= Trexler Nature Preserve =

Park in Lehigh County, Pennsylvania (est. 2006)

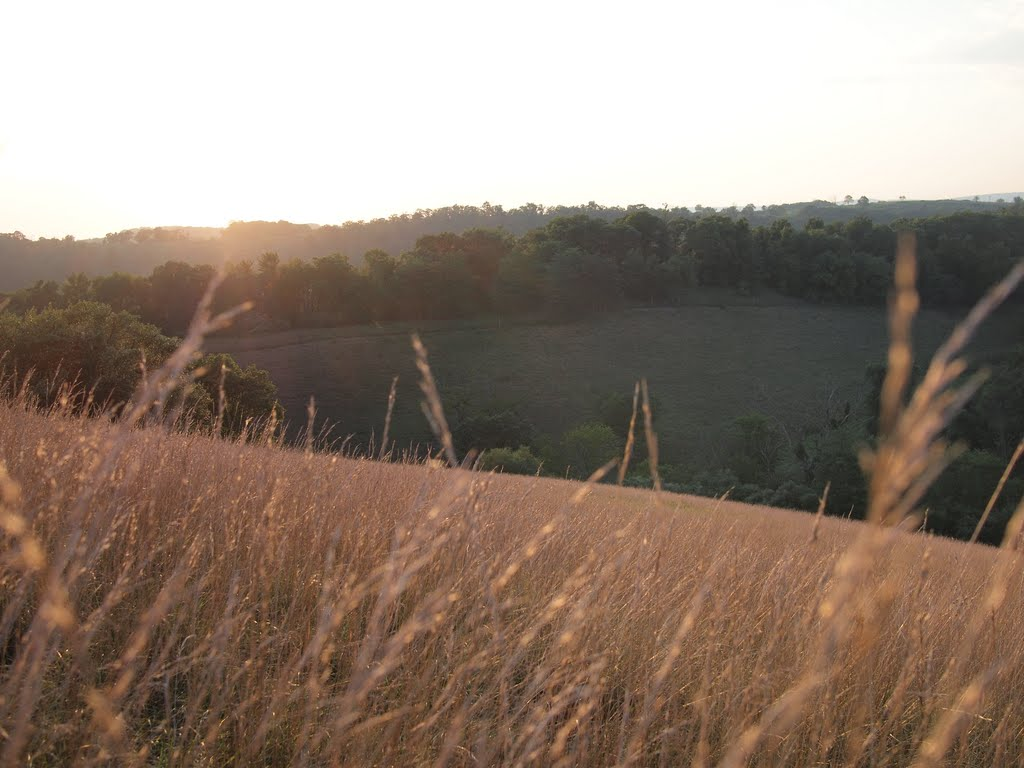
- Grasslands in Trexler Nature Preserve in August 2011

- Location within Pennsylvania
- Location: Lowhill Township and North Whitehall Township, Lehigh County, Pennsylvania
- Coordinates: 40°39′28″N 75°37′59″W
- Area: 1,108 acres (4.48 km^{2})
- Elevation: 751 ft (229 m)
- Established: 2006; 20 years ago
- Named for: General Harry Clay Trexler
- Governing body: Lehigh County
- Website: Official website

The Trexler Nature Preserve is an 1,108-acre county park (448 ha) owned and maintained by Lehigh County in the Lehigh Valley region of Pennsylvania. The preserve is situated in Lowhill Township and North Whitehall Township near the community of Schnecksville. The land that comprises the preserve was originally purchased between 1901 and 1911 by local industrialist General Harry Clay Trexler.

It was originally Trexler's desire to stock the preserve with big game animals such as bison, elk, and deer with the express goal of saving bison in North American. When Trexler died in 1933, the preserve, in accordance with his will, passed to the care of Lehigh County. Lehigh County assumed title in 1935 and has been in control of the site ever since. In May 1975, the county opened the Lehigh Valley Zoo on the grounds of the preserve.

In 2004, Lehigh County reduced its budgets and proposed closing the zoo portion of the preserve. A local group, the Lehigh Valley Zoological Society, formed to assume private control of the zoo under a lease arrangement with Lehigh County. Concurrent with the transfer of the zoo to private control, the Trexler Trust brought civil suit against the County of Lehigh demanding, under the terms of Trexler's will, that the entire preserve be opened to public use and that public funds be devoted to that public use.

The county, under pressure from the Trexler Trust, acceded to a settlement in 2006. As part of this settlement, Lehigh County agreed to open the entire preserve to public use and to rename the non-zoo portion of the park from the "Trexler Game Preserve" to the "Trexler Nature Preserve". Since re-opening the entire preserve to public use, extensive efforts have been made to increase passive recreational activities, such as hiking and mountain biking, by building an extensive trail system and archery hunting and fishing by changing cull policies and stocking Jordan Creek. Invasive plants, which colonized large parts of the preserve after nearly a century of range practices, were largely removed.

== History ==
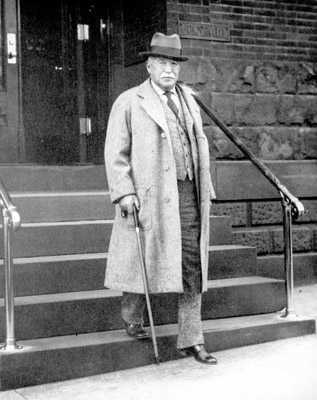
General Harry Clay Trexler, whose philanthropy established Trexler Nature Preserve

European settlers have used the land that is now the Trexler Nature preserve since at least the 1760s when Micheal Mosser purchased a large tract of land in Lowhill Township and erected a gristmill on Mill Creek, which was the source of the creek's name. This mill was one of the first of its kind in the county, and certainly the first in Lowhill Township.

In 1800, John Hollenbach started a competing mill on the creek's east side. These mills carried on throughout the nineteenth century and into the twentieth. In 1901 local industrialist General Harry Clay Trexler, began purchasing much of the surrounding farmland in order to form a "deer reservation".

Trexler was native to the Lehigh Valley; he was born in Easton in 1854. He made his fortune in timber and concrete and by the turn of the 20th century was a wealthy man. Like many wealthy men his age at the time, Trexler enjoyed hunting and the wilderness. An early environmentalist, Trexler believed that much of the large wild game in the United States had been hunted to the brink of extinction and that efforts were needed to protect those that remained. Acting on this belief, he began to buy dozens of farmsteads in Lowhill Township and North Whitehall Township beginning in 1901 to create a game reservation. At its inception, this reservation was known as the "Trexler Deer Reservation". A contemporary source described the project as follows:

In 1901, General Harry C. Trexler embarked in a great agricultural enterprise which has attracted marked attention, not only in Lehigh County but throughout the entire State of Pennsylvania. He then began to purchase farms in North Whitehall and Lowhill townships along the Jordan and Mill creeks in the vicinity of Schnecksville, ten miles northwest from Allentown, and until this year he has secured altogether twenty-four farms, which cover a total area, in contiguous tracts, amounting to 2,500 acres. He immediately began to turn up the soil of the hilly, unprofitable land and sow seeds in order to secure permanent pasture, and when these made their appearance he set apart about 1,000 acres, enclosed with an 8-foot wire fence, and placed there seventy deer and several buffaloes and elk.

The deer reservation continued under the supervision of P.S. Fenstermacher, a prominent and politically connected Allentown farmer, until Trexler's untimely death in 1933. Trexler's will provided that the deer reservation be devised in fee simple to Lehigh County. The will also made provision that the land be "for use as a public park, by the citizens of [Lehigh] County[.]"

Probate of Trexler's will was settled in 1935 and left the county owning the renamed "Trexler Game Preserve". For the next forty years, the preserve was open only on Sundays, with informal petting and feeding exhibits. In 1969, the game preserve commission engaged McFadzean, Everly & Associates to plan and develop a children's zoo at the site. This twenty-nine-acre zoo opened May 18, 1975. The exhibits became more formalized, and the animal collection was expanded to include exotic animals from Africa, Asia, and Australia. Construction costs for the zoo originally estimated at $400,000 quickly increased to more than $2,000,000. Admission projections, originally estimated to reach 650,000 by 1977, only reached 112,342 that year.

As the legacy cost of construction increased and admissions stayed languid, budgets became increasingly stretched. In the early 2000s, Lehigh County floated the idea of closing the zoo. In 2004, the private Lehigh Valley Zoological Society was formed and brokered a lease with the county whereby the zoo would be maintained, but under private control. Concurrent with the transfer and lease of zoo operations, the Trexler Trust brought civil suit against the county claiming that the county was obliged to open the preserve land to the public. Lehigh County acceded to a $1.9 million settlement and the Trexler Trust committed to provide another $850,000. These monies were to be used to reopen the entire preserve to the general public.

In the winter and spring of 2005 and 2006, respectively, interviews and public meetings were conducted to determine how to return the preserve to public use. The overwhelming response was that the land should be brought back to its natural state (much harmed after years of inartful range management) and that passive recreational facilities (such as hiking trails) should be constructed. In response to this input, Lehigh County commissioned and built a new trail system and, as of 2013, continues efforts to reclaim the land from damage caused by inartful range management.

== Topography ==
Most of the Preserve's distinctive topography is a consequence of water erosion by Jordan Creek and its tributaries through the uplands of the Schochary Ridge.

=== Geology ===
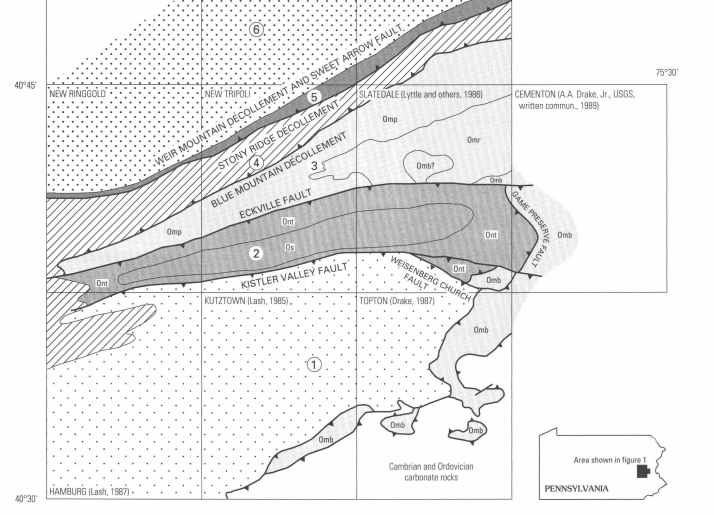
Geology underlying Trexler Nature Preserve

The park's boundaries are on the far-east terminus of the Schochary Ridge; It marks the boundary of the "Game Preserve" fault line which separates the New Tripoli formation of the Schochary Ridge and the Martinsburg formations. The Schochary Ridge is an outcropping of rock which formed during the last stages of the Taconic orogeny. The long east–west-oriented ridge is several miles south of Kittatinny Ridge (within the otherwise flat and fertile Lehigh Valley) and is bisected, within the park, by Jordan Creek.

The non-Schochary geology of the Nature Preserve is of the Martinsburg Formation, predominately made up of New Tripoli Member. The Martinsburg Formation developed during the Ordovician period (490 to 443 million years ago), and is characterized by dark grey shale and thin beds of siltstone and sandstone, with depths up to 12,000 feet. The New Tripoli group, the dominant geologic member in the preserve, is composed of shale and calcareous turbidites with sedimentary characteristics. Shale is largely impervious to water producing high surface runoff, but its weak structure is highly erodible, resulting in gentle slopes.

=== Hydrology ===
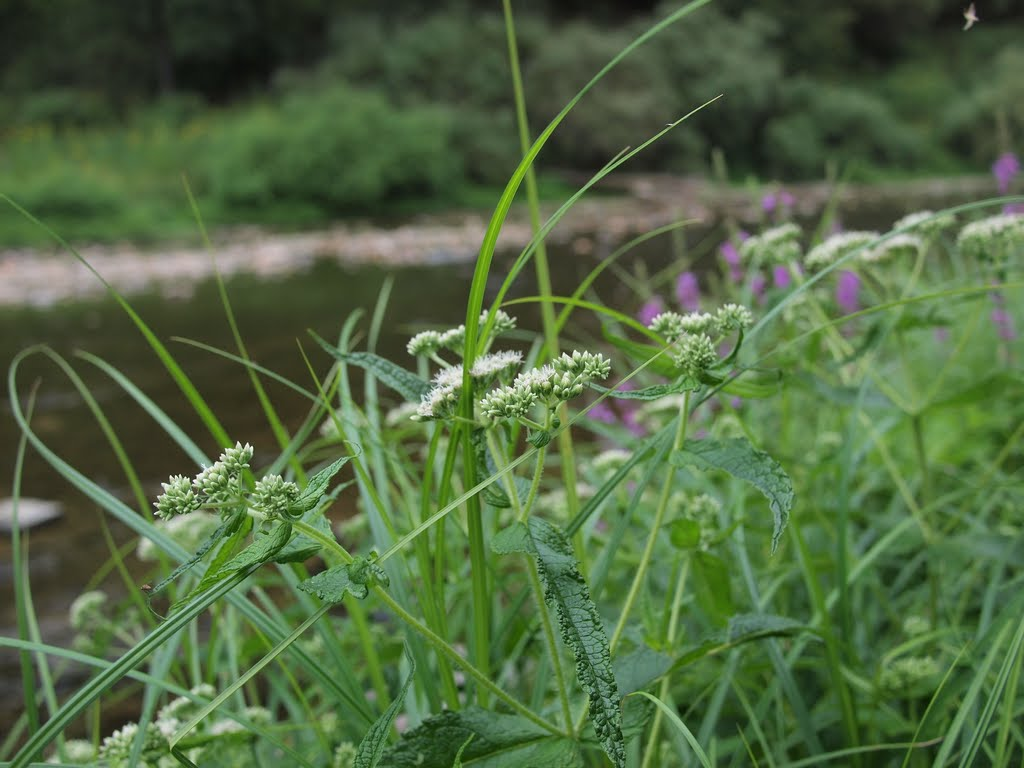
Wildflowers in front of Jordan Creek

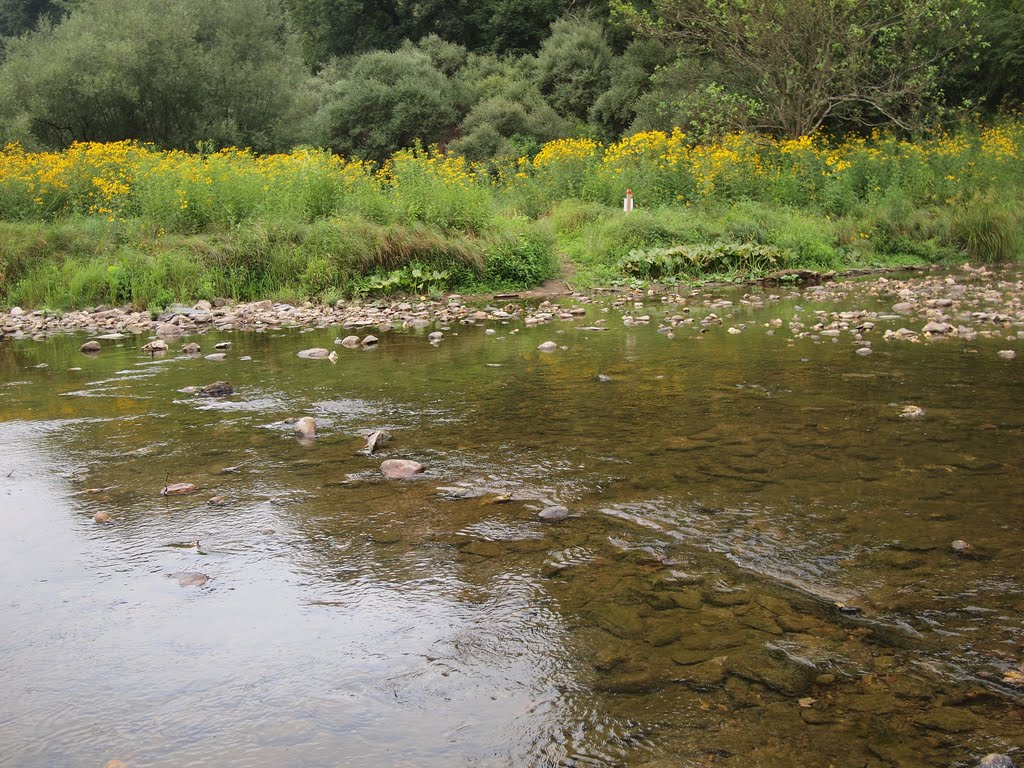
View of wildflowers from across Jordan Creek

Jordan Creek and its minor tributaries, including Mill Creek, Hegel's Run, Elk Ridge Run, Macintosh Run, and Thicket Run, give the preserve a distinctive hill and valley character. The preserve is the easternmost extent of Schochary Ridge, which arises from the relatively flat surfaces of the Lehigh Valley. Over eons this elevation gave rise to gradients, allowing water flow to erode the ridge into its current topography.

Mill Creek is a major perennial tributary; its watershed drains large portions of agricultural land in the Lowhill Township, southern Heidelberg, and Washington Townships. Mill Creek does not enter the preserve but forms its geographic western boundary and joins with the Jordan Creek just short of the preserve. The creek, whose swift waters eroded the valley in which it flows, separates the preserve from the more westerly State Game Lands 205. Mill Creek also provides a perennial source of water which helps to maintain the thicket of deciduous trees, which are principally oak and maple and grow on the preserve's north-western boundary.

After the confluence of the Jordan and Mill Creeks, the Jordan enters the preserve and heads north-north-east. To its west, the Jordan is bounded by the imposing Mill Hill (along which the Theyken Ridge Trail runs). Further downstream, Mill Hill recedes straight north as the Jordan turns east—Mill Hill's proximity to the Jordan is further distanced by a valley cut by Hegel's Run.

Hegel's Run is a perennial minor tributary of Jordan Creek, originating within skunk cabbage wetlands in the interior of the preserve. Flowing north to south, Hegel's Run continues out of the wetlands and parallel to the Fireman's trail where, along its course, it is fed by two smaller unnamed tributaries originating from springs on the sloping Mill Hill which are blanketed by a heavy canopy of autumn-olive and by a minor tributary originating to the northeast in the grassy Schantz valley. Hegel's Run flows further south where, after being crossed by the firemen's trail forms a confluence with Jordan Creek immediately upstream of Schlicher's Covered Bridge.

After passing under Schlicher's Covered Bridge and a pedestrian footbridge, the Jordan Creek makes a hairpin curve, ultimately turning to flow straight south. To the east of the creek, in this section, arises Elk Ridge, which is the last and easterly most rise of the Schochary Ridge. The elevation rise from Jordan Creek to Elk Ridge is the steepest gradient and largest elevation gain in the park. The Jordan continues under a second pedestrian bridge—erected in 1997—and over the Zoo's ford. Elk Ridge Run, Macintosh Run and Thicket Run are all seasonally intermittent minor tributaries of the Jordan. Just before the ford, the Jordan is joined by Elk Ridge Run. This south flowing watercourse begins near the bison paddocks and drains the eastern slope of Elk Ridge and the western slope of the environmental center grasslands. After the ford, the Jordan Creek continues south until forming a confluence with Macintosh Run.

Macintosh Run begins south of the composting center and drains much of the former orchard that used to occupy this location. It flows south, along Old Packhouse Road and mixes with the Jordan before the latter crosses under the Geiger Covered Bridge. After the bridge, the Jordan maintains its southerly course through thickets of conifer, Eastern Hemlock, and wildflowers. Just before passing under the Ruheton bridge (and out of the park), the Jordan is joined by Thicket Run. Thicket Run drains two small ponds in the South Range before flowing to the Jordan under a makeshift metal bridge which carries the Trexler Border Trail. The Jordan subsequently continues on its course and eventually joins the waters of the Little Lehigh River, the Lehigh River, and the Delaware River, before proceeding out to sea.

=== Ranges ===
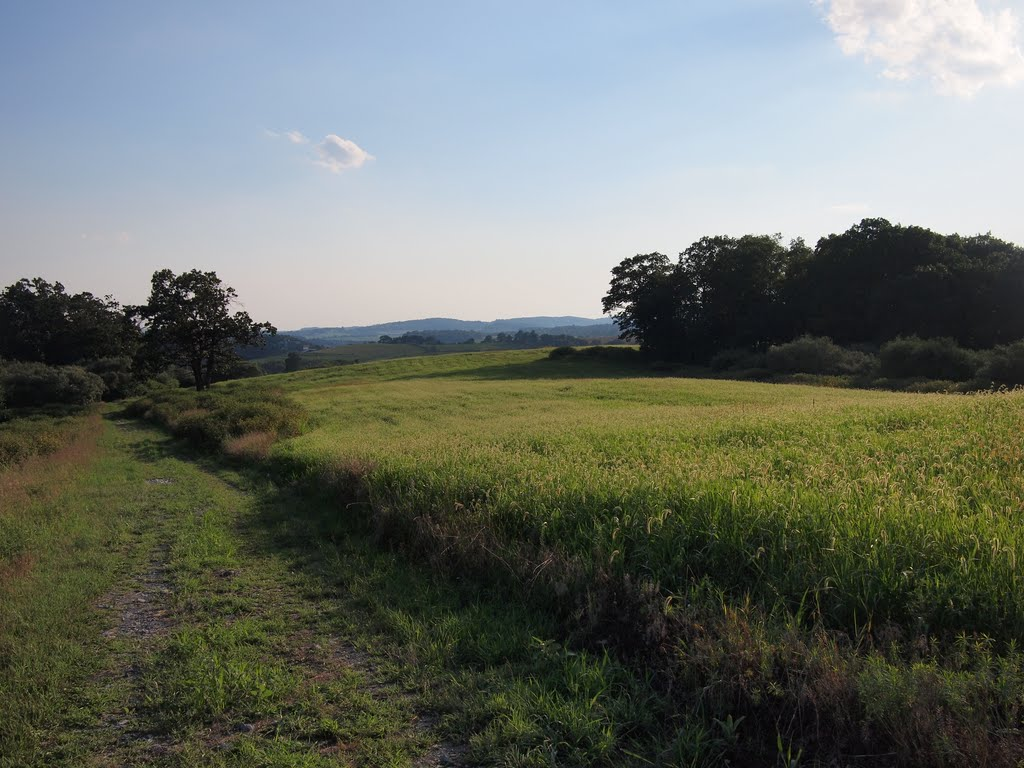
The Northern Range at Trexler Nature Preserve

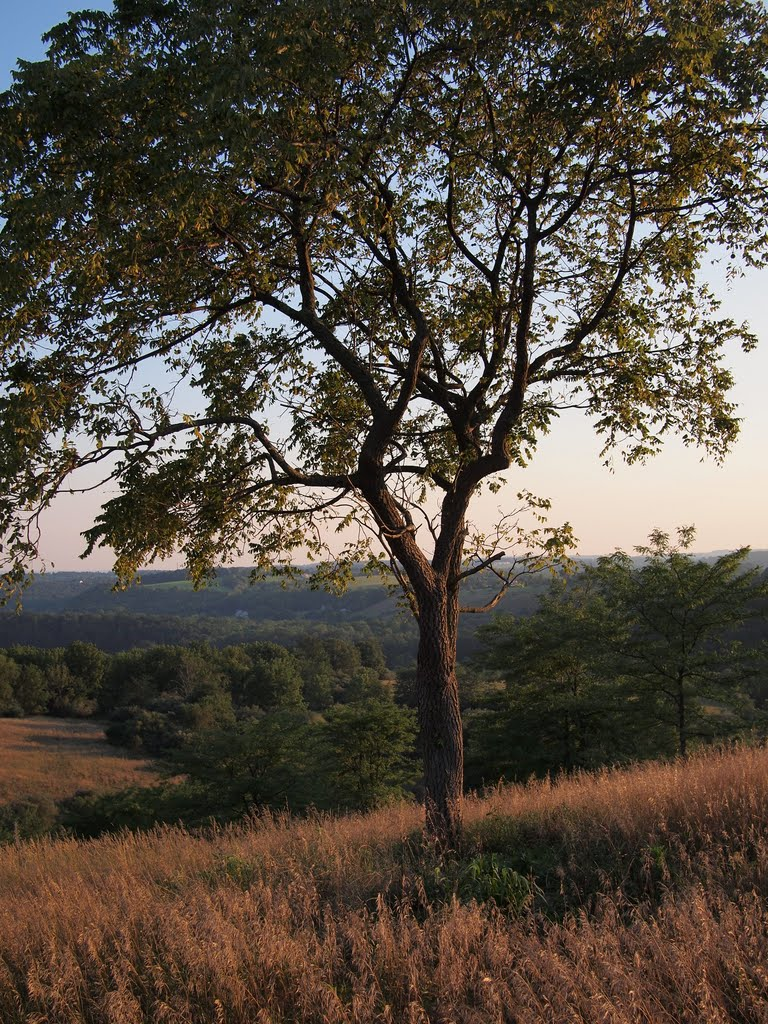
A locust tree in the grasslands of Trexler Nature Preserve's Central Range

Since 2006, the preserve has been split into three areas, known as ranges: the Northern, the Central, and the Southern Range. Each range is marked by its own distinctive topography and flora.

The Northern Range begins in Schnecksville and is bounded in the east by Hegel's Run and in the south by Jordan Creek. It is best described as the "uplands" of the preserve. Starting from either Jordan Creek or Hegel's Run requires a steep northerly ascent up Mill Hill. Once on top of the ridge, there are sweeping views of the entire Lehigh Valley and, particularly, the Kittatinny Ridge. During summer, there can be some agriculture development of the uplands. In the early 2010s, the preserve attempted to grow both corn and turnips in its rocky and eroded soil. When the land is not under agricultural development, it consists mostly of grass lands whose territory is perpetually threatened by encroachment of autumn-olive.

Since the early 2010s, the Northern Range has also been developed by the Valley Mountain Bikers. They have developed mountain biking trails through dense thickets of autumn-olive. The trails are open to the public and can be accessed via the North Range Utility Road and parking lot.

The central Range is the largest of the three ranges; it also contains the greatest variation of topography. It is bounded on the north by the Jordan Creek and Hegel's Run and on the south by Old Packhouse Road—a portion of the southern end is occupied by the Lehigh County composting facility. The Central Range is subdivided into eastern and western sections by the Jordan Creek.

The Eastern Central Range begins south of Hegel's Run and is centered around the dramatic Elk Ridge, which is the highest point in the preserve and also forms the extreme easterly extent of the Schochary Ridge. Elk Ridge is home to the preserve's bison and elk herds. The extreme eastern boundary which borders Lehigh Carbon County Community College is marked by a deciduous tree-line of walnut, oak, and maple receding into grasslands interspersed with autumn-olive. Atop a grassland ridge line in the Eastern Central Range is the post-modern Prairie School styled environmental education center. Opened in 2010, the Trexler Environmental Center is located in a 2,700-square-foot building that has been Leadership in Energy and Environmental Design (LEED) certified.

The center is on one of the highest parts of the preserve and features straight lines, a low profile, and muted colors which merge the building into dramatically rolling grasslands. It also has a rooftop observation area, a community room for environmental education programs and meetings, and restroom facilities for park visitors. The building also houses satellite offices for the Lehigh County Parks Department and the Pennsylvania Bureau of Forestry.

The Western Central Range begins south of Jordan Creek and is centered around the Lehigh Valley Zoo. Because of the presence of the zoo, and the road connectivity, including the Jordan Ford, it is the most visited section of the preserve. This section has views of west-facing Lowhill Township grasslands. The lowland sections provide views of eastern Pennsylvania river valleys, and fishing opportunities. The Trexler Border Trail, as it descends off the western veld and down into the Jordan Creek Valley, is surrounded in spring and summer by fecund native wildflower, which draw abundant native butterfly and birds. The Trexler nature trail, which follows Jordan Creek from the ford has views of the river, as well as mixed deciduous and conifer forest and exposed shale formations which are often covered in damp mosses. There are bird blinds in this area for ornithologists.

The Northern boundary of the Southern Range is Old Packhouse Road and its Southern the boundary of a commercial orchard. This range is the least visited and most ecologically precarious of the three with only a single trail leading into this area—the Trexler border trail. At one time, large parts of this range were in production as an apple orchard. Stands of old apple trees interspersed with autumn-olive dot this landscape. At the far south of the park is a large glade of Eastern Hemlock and other conifers which provides a distinctly different forest environment from elsewhere in the preserve. The confluence of Thicket Run and the Jordan Creek also create a moist lowland ideal for the growth of wildflowers and cattails.

== Flora and fauna ==
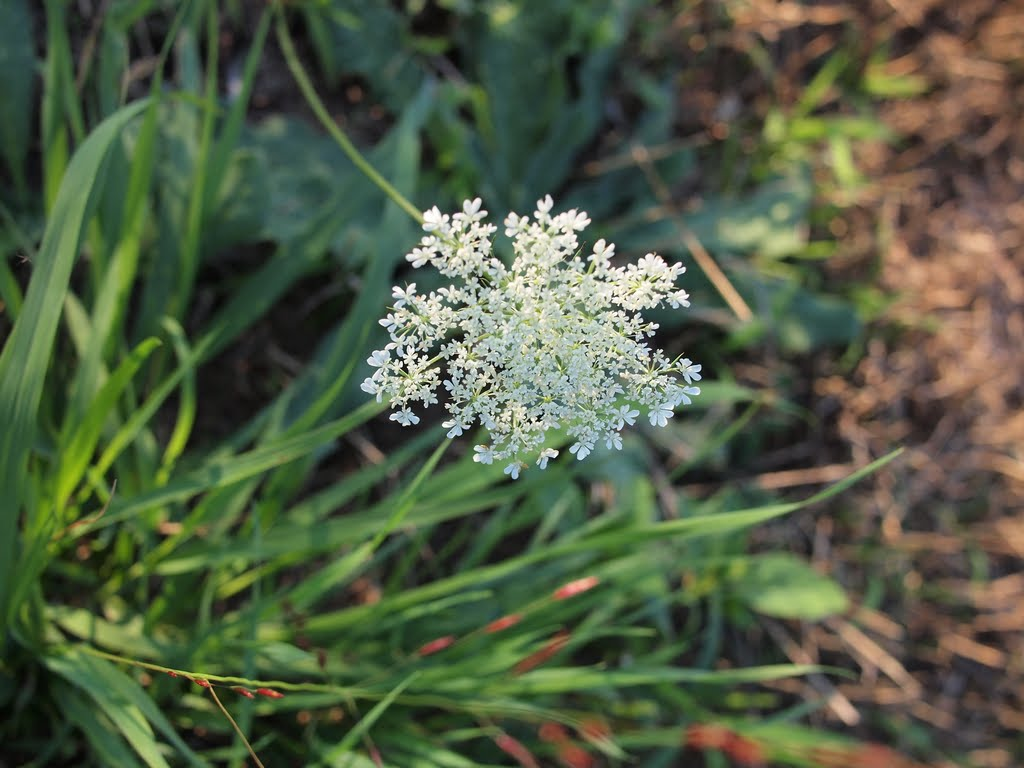
Queen Anne's Lace, a flower native to Europe

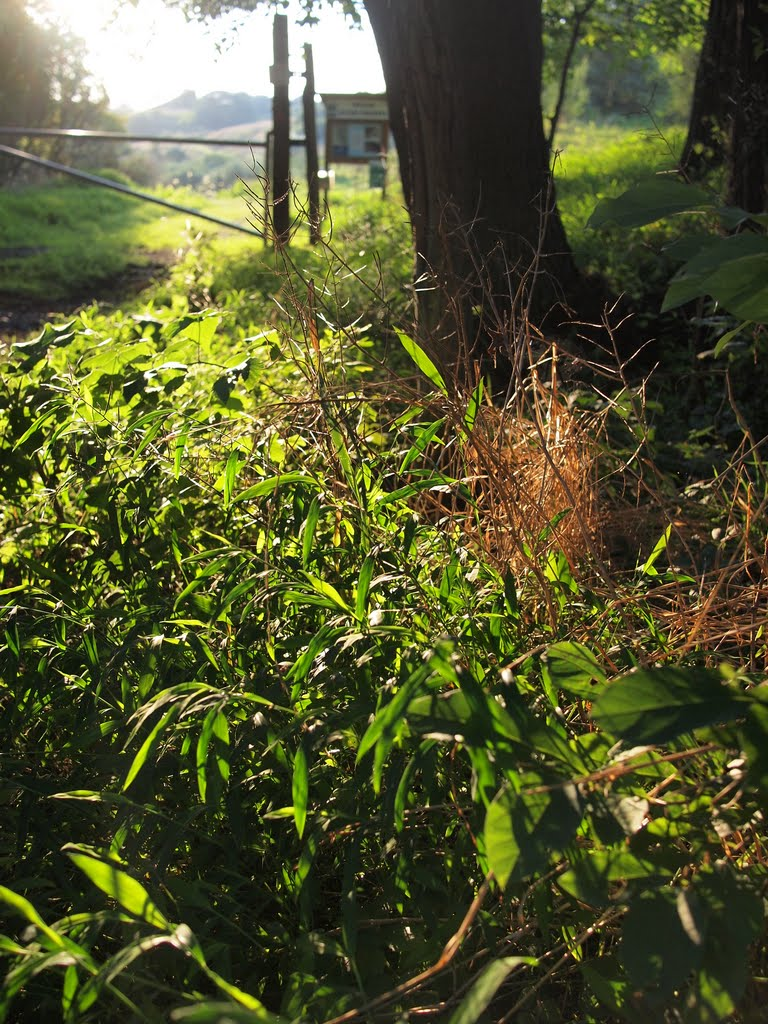
Invasive stilt grass and native trees by the preserve's Northern Range Gate

Clearing Autumn Olive at Trexler Nature Preserve on the hill slopes of the northern range in November 2015

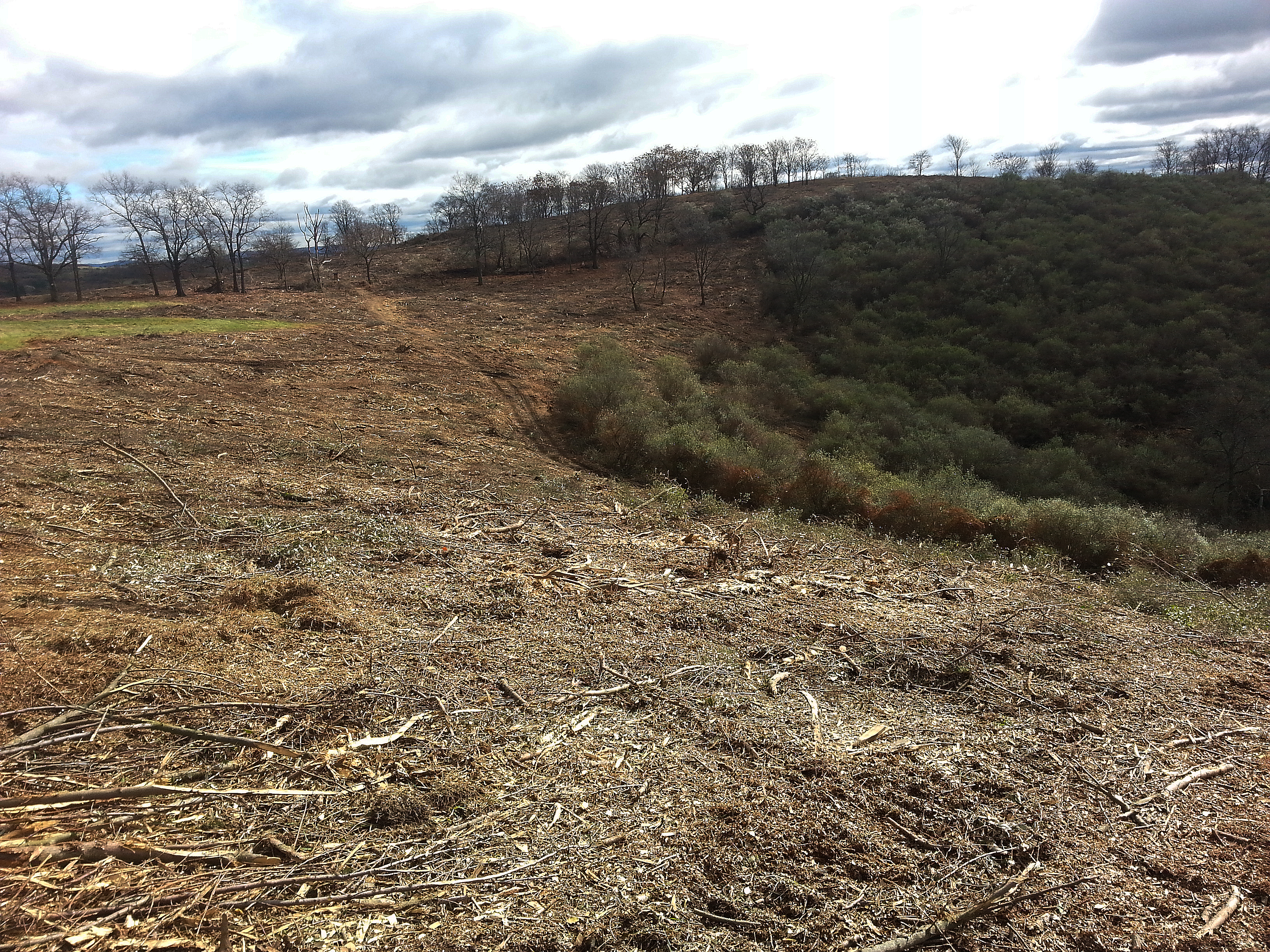
Denuded Hillsides in northern range after mechanical removal of autumn-olive in November 2015

Much of the preserve consists of rolling expanses of grassland, is characterized by landscape that is unnatural to eastern Pennsylvania and is dominated by non-native plant species. This is a consequence of the early history of the preserve as poorly managed reservation for large ruminant animals and as an experimental apple orchard. This landscape is not native to the humid temperate climate of eastern Pennsylvania. Such grassland in eastern Pennsylvania are typically only found in dairy and beef farming operations. These animal's feeding habits control the emergence of invasive plants preventing reclamation of the land by forests.

Natural grasslands are typically limited to semi-arid areas of the world which have long periods of low humidity, intermittent rainfall, and large herds of wild ruminants. Such semi-arid, intermittent humidity climate is characteristic of the Great Plains, home of the American bison which Trexler sought to protect by establishing the preserve. To establish grassland in his reservation, Trexler ordered marginal rocky lands plowed and the planting of grasses. In consequence large swaths of land were converted to grassland. The passive management of animals upon this new grassland was poor. Far too many animals were allowed to graze. By one count, in 1935, over 250 deer, elk, and bison occupied each square mile of the preserve. Modern game management aims for no more than twenty such animals per square mile.

The result of this overgrazing on the native plant ecology and grassland was catastrophic. With no natural competition, autumn-olive, stilt grass, garlic mustard, ailanthus, Japanese barberry, and oriental bittersweet grew without control.

The preserve has taken efforts to restore native species since 2006. Efforts have included the mechanized destruction of autumn-olive thickets and the controlled archery hunting of the deer population. Despite the unchecked growth of non-native species in many areas of the preserve, some areas of the park remain somewhat unaffected. This is particularly true of the Southern range, the well-maintained and mowed grasslands of the central range, and places where thick deciduous or conifer forest prevented the growth of autumn-olive in the forest under story. In these areas large stands of oak, maple, walnut, hemlock, and pine still exist along with native wildflowers, mosses, and where moist, ferns.

By far, the worst disruption to the park has been caused by autumn-olive which easily colonized the grasslands and deciduous under-story of all parts of the preserve—and particularly the steep hillsides of the Northern Range. Eradication of this autumn-olive is difficult because of the extremely dense thickets in which autumn-olive grows, the countless blunt thorns found on all areas of the plant, and the sometimes extremely steep topography on which it grows. Despite the difficulties, in October and November 2015, the Trexler Nature Preserve has stepped up efforts to mechanically clear hundreds of acres of autumn-olive from the northern range. This effort requires a pair bulldozers equipped with a mechanical grinder that slowly make their way up and down the steep hills grinding and pulverizing the thorny, bush like autumn-olive into rough mulch. The result is large swaths of the northern range that, as of, November 2015 are entirely denuded of vegetation. In spring 2016, the Preserve intends to use chemical herbicides to ensure that the autumn-olive has been eradicated and then replant native grasses and wildflowers to reestablish the unique rolling grasslands characteristic of the Preserve. The eradication efforts were funded by a grant from the Voluntary Public Access and Habitat Incentive Program.

The preserve has also started a project to reintroduce American chestnut - a native tree that was nearly destroyed by blight at the end of the nineteenth century.

== Recreation ==
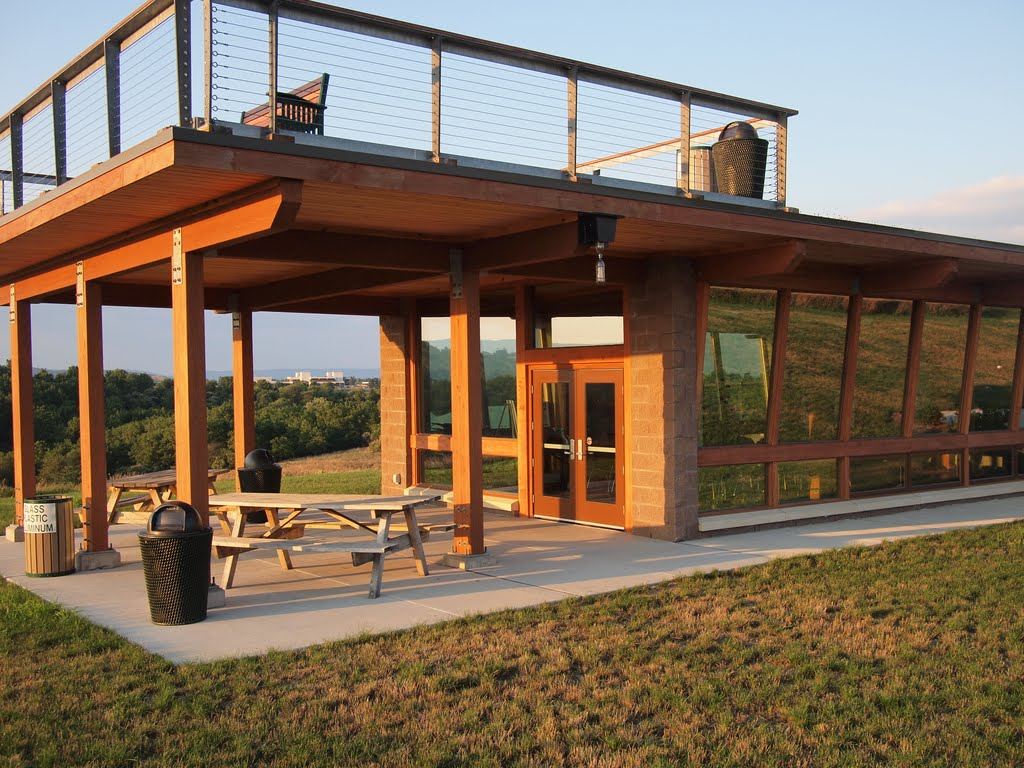
Trexler Environmental Center

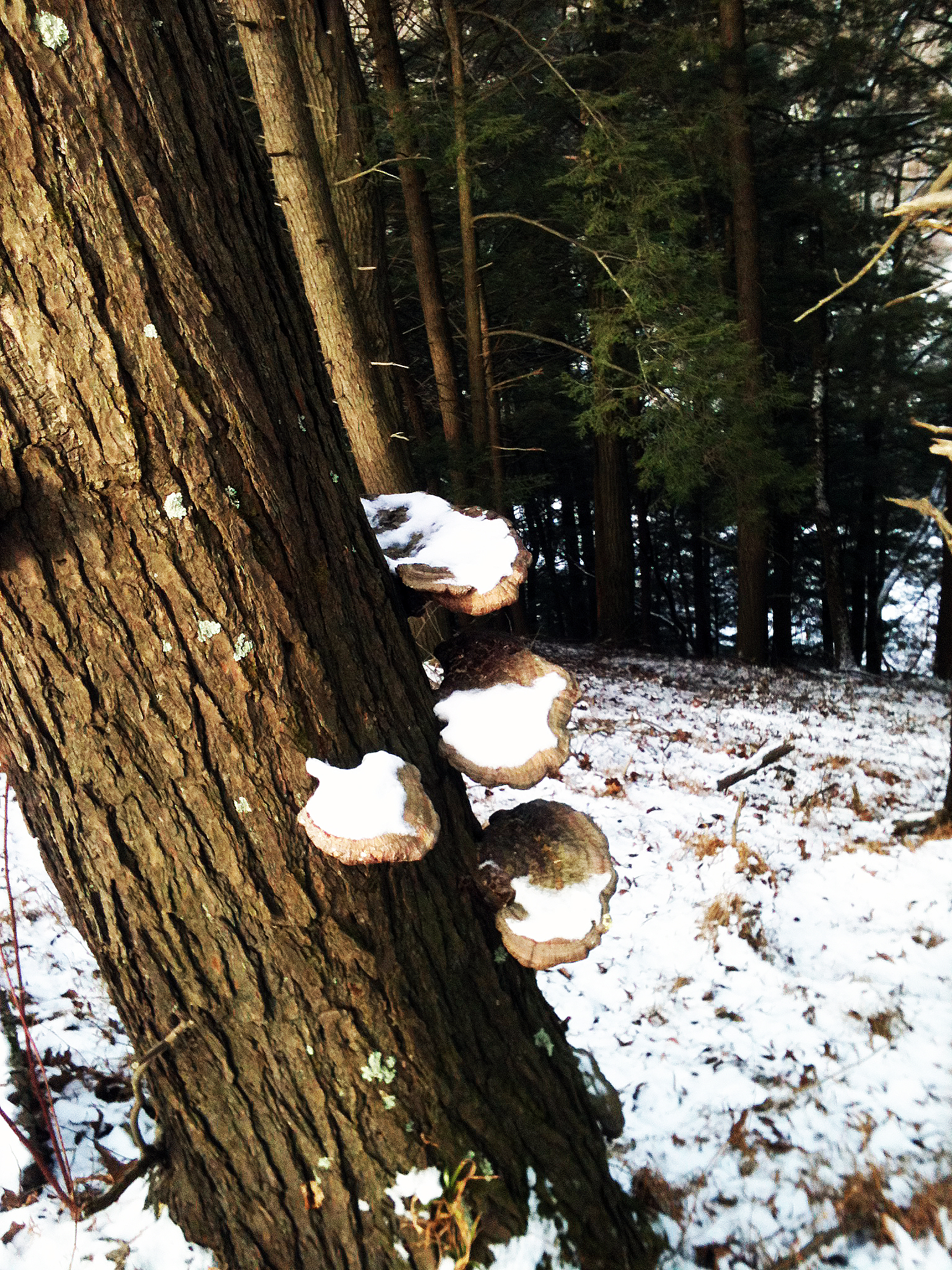
A tree in the Southern Range covered in snow and bracket fungus, looking down into the conifer glade

An account of the preserve in 1914 when still privately owned by Trexler as the "Trexler Deer Preserve" noted that "[the animals] have become a great curiosity, and many persons are seen almost daily, especially on Sundays, driving or walking along the road from Schnecksville through the park for several miles, to see the wild animals grazing on the hill-sides." Trexler was aware of the importance of the preserve to valley residents, he noted:

[i]f a trip through my preserve has opened to you a little wider the great outdoors, and nature has revealed something you may not before have seen or known, I shall feel repaid in my efforts to help conserve in its proper setting some of our wildlife.

In contemplation of the importance of the preserve, Trexler devised the property to the County of Lehigh in fee simple with instructions that it should forever be maintained for the benefit of the citizens of Lehigh County.

Through the 1960s, passive recreation in the preserve dwindled. It was only open on Sundays, and then only for informal petting and animal watching. The Lehigh Valley Zoo opened in 1975 after six years of planning. In 2006, as a settlement to litigation brought by the Trexler Trust, Lehigh County agreed to reopen the entire preserve for public use. An overwhelming majority of respondents to a survey indicated that the preserve should be used for passive recreation—activities including hiking, low-impact mountain biking and fishing.

=== Hiking ===
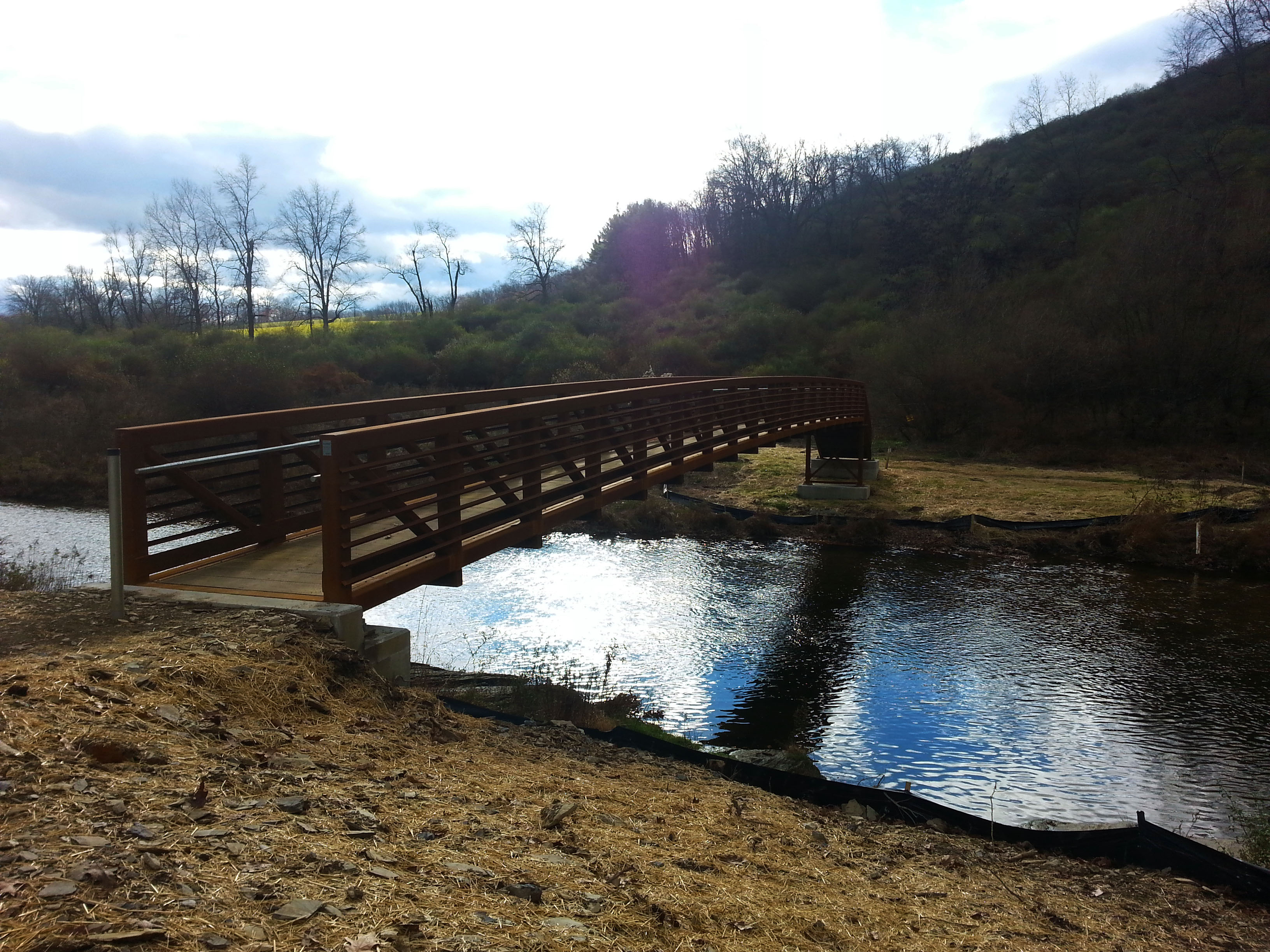
The bridge, erected in October 2015, that carries the Trexler Border Trail over Jordan Creek in the Trexler Nature Preserve

Starting in the late 2000s, Lehigh County, with the assistance of the Trexler Trust undertook to build a new system of trails in the interior of the preserve. These trails sought to open large swaths of the preserve that were previously closed to the public. After construction, these trails were mapped by GPS and an interactive map is available as part of Google Maps. Nearly all the hiking trails can also be utilized for mountain biking and horse riding.

In October 2015, the Trexler Nature Preserve finished construction of the 9-mile Trexler Border Trail by erecting a concrete and steel bridge across the Jordan Creek.

=== Mountain biking ===
The Valley Mountain Bikers Association has teamed with the preserve to open large areas of the Northern Range to mountain biking. To date, 6.00 miles (9.66 km) of dedicated use mountain biking trails have been constructed in the Northern range. Much of this construction has occurred within dense thickets of autumn-olive. Public access to the mountain biking trails is available via the Northern Range Utility Road and parking lot.

=== Lehigh Valley Zoo ===
The Lehigh Valley Zoo, established in 1975, is now a privately run enterprise which leases its land and buildings from Lehigh County.

=== Hunting and fishing ===
For nearly a century, the preserve operated with a philosophy not to cull its deer population. This, combined with the bison and elk herds led to animal populations in excess of 250 animals per square mile. Modern game management aims to prevent populations from rising to above twenty animals per square mile. In an effort to reduce the deer population to acceptable ecological limits, the preserve permitted archery hunting for the first time during the 2007 deer season. The hunt yielded a substantial number of deer, including large bucks. Archery hunting is still permitted in some parts of the preserve, provided that the hunter is properly licensed by the Commonwealth of Pennsylvania, that the hunt occurs during the normal archery season, and subject to all other Commonwealth hunting statutes and regulations.

Beginning in 2008, the Pennsylvania Fish and Boat Commission began to stock Jordan Creek with trout. Several hundred yards of easily accessible river front was set aside for children and the disabled.
