= Little Lehigh Creek =

Creek in eastern Pennsylvania, USA

Coordinates: 40°35′50″N 75°26′54″W

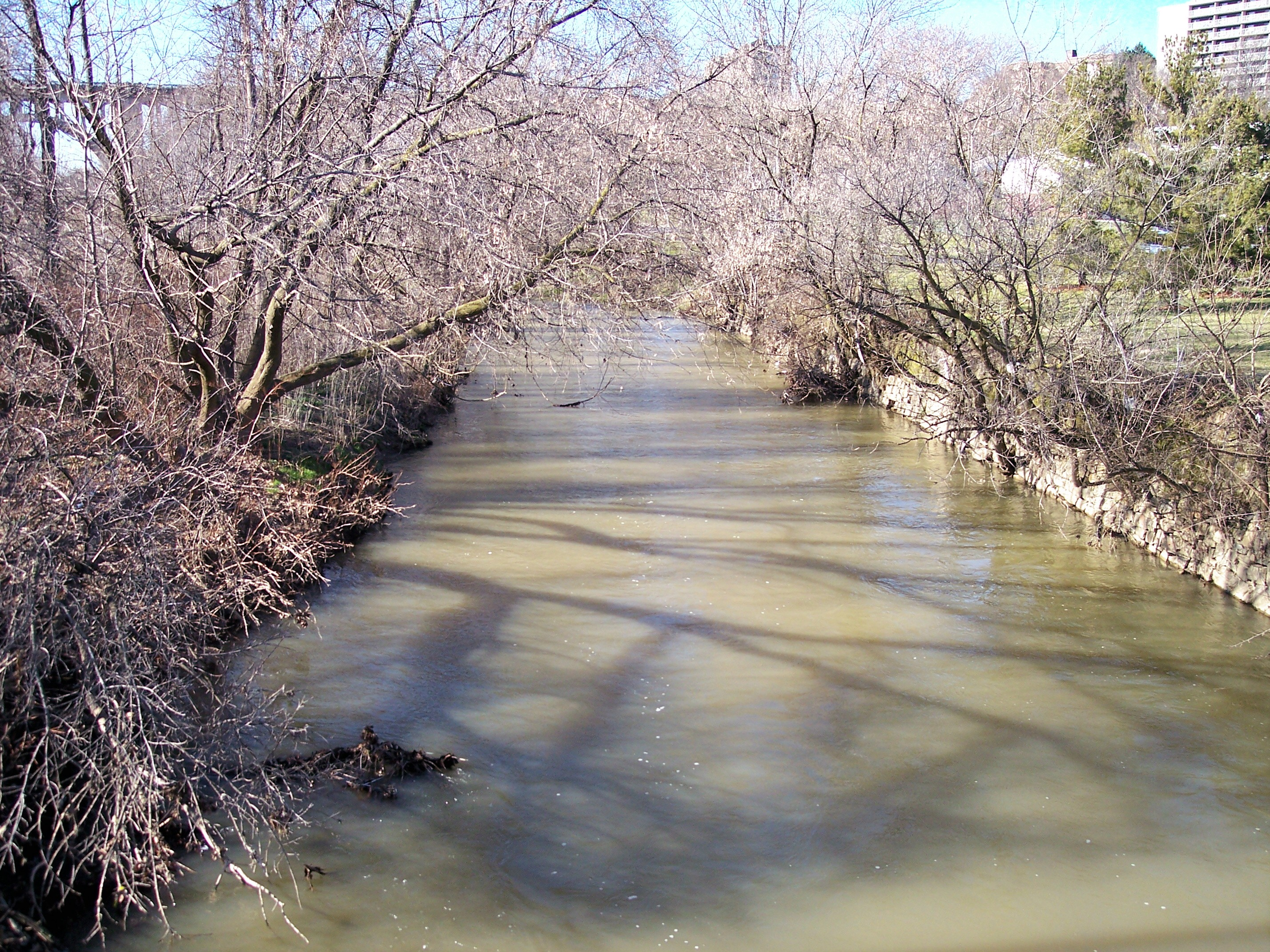
Little Lehigh Creek in Allentown, Pennsylvania in January 2007

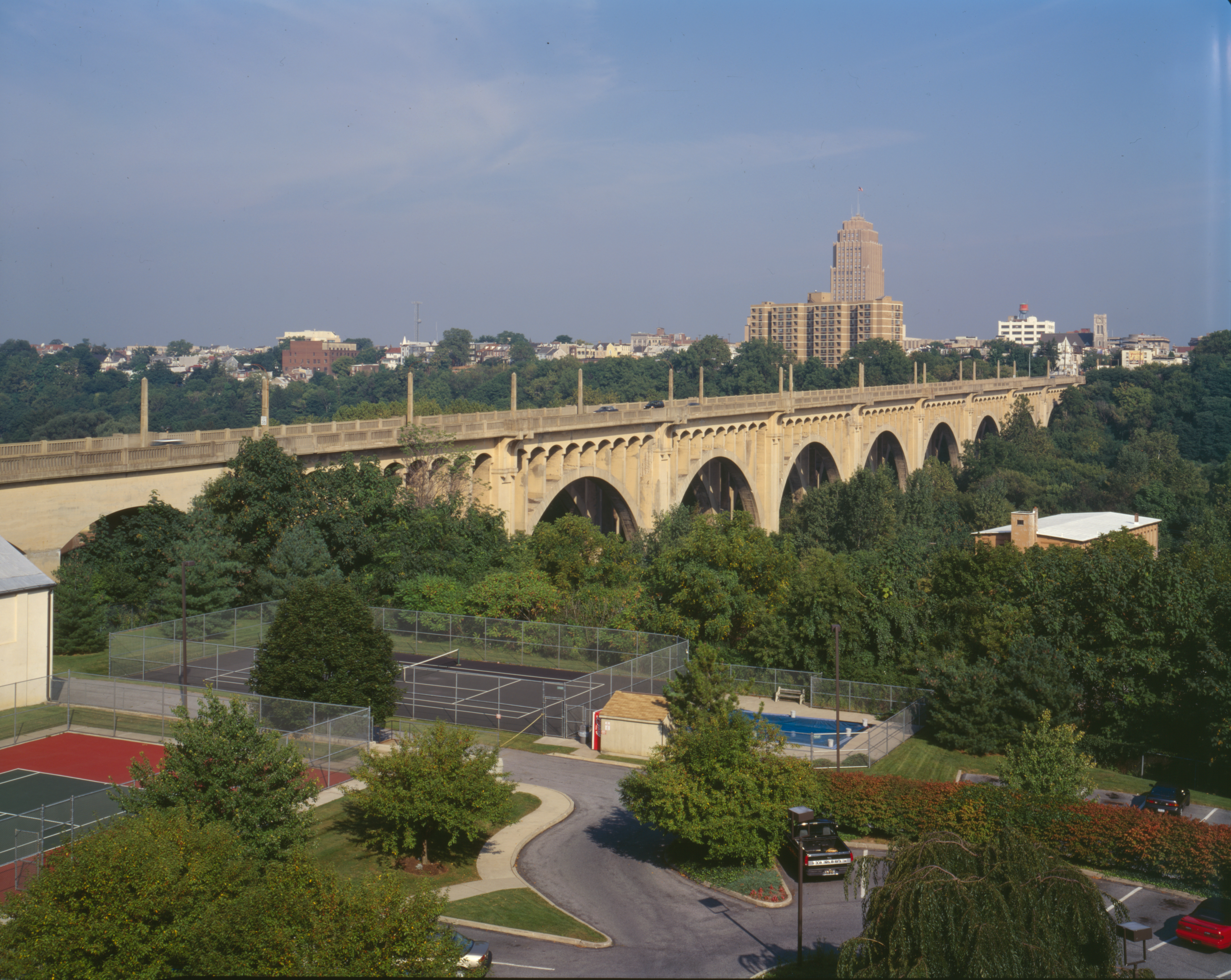
Albertus L. Meyers Bridge crossing the Little Lehigh in Allentown in May 2007

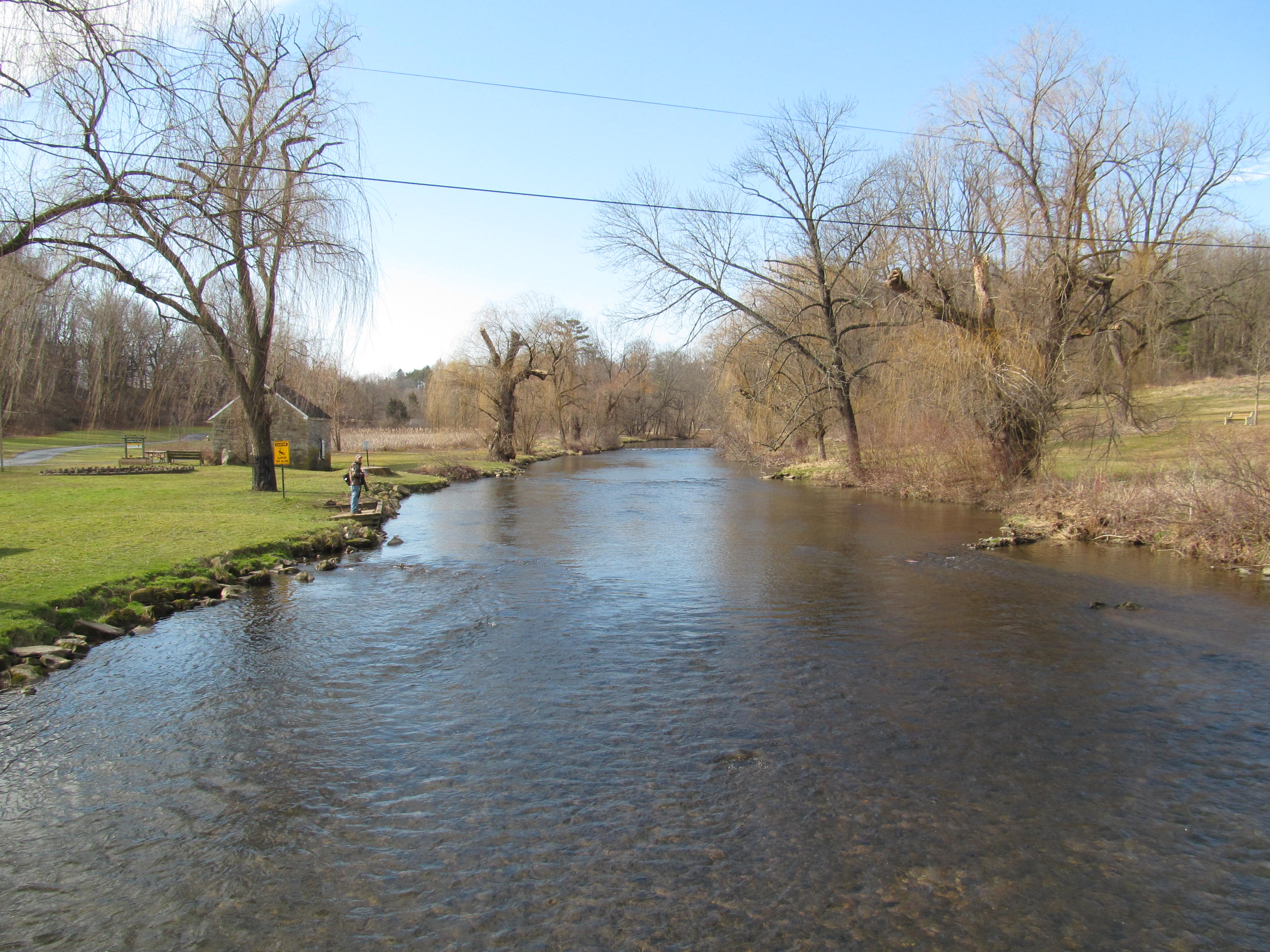
Little Lehigh Creek at Little Lehigh Park in Allentown in January 2013

Little Lehigh Creek is approximately 24.0 miles (38.6 km) long and is located in the Lehigh Valley region of eastern Pennsylvania. It is sometimes referred to as the Little Lehigh River. It is the largest tributary of the Lehigh River.

The creek flows in a winding course through the Lehigh Valley. It originates in Longswamp Township in Berks County and flows generally northeast through Lower Macungie Township and Salisbury Township. In the city of Allentown, it receives Jordan Creek, just before flowing into the Lehigh River.

The Little Lehigh has 88.8 square miles (230.0 km^{2}) of drainage area in Lehigh County and 18.7 square miles (48.4 km^{2}) of drainage area in Berks County.

== Recreation ==
The Little Lehigh forms a linear park in Allentown and Emmaus. This park has a covered bridge and walking trails along the creek. In spite of a trout hatchery in the park, the stream is known for its population of wild brown trout. Sections of the stream are designated for catch and release fly fishing only. There are extensive equestrian trails running along the stream through the park used by riders, runners and walkers.

== Tributaries ==
- Cedar Creek
- Jordan Creek
  - Switzer Creek
  - Mill Creek (Jordan Creek)
  - Hegel's Run
    - Schantz Valley Creek
  - Elk Ridge Run
  - Macintosh Run
  - Thicket Run
  - Haasadahl Creek
- Leibert Creek
- Spring Creek
- Swabia Creek (also called Swope Creek)

== See also ==
- List of rivers of Pennsylvania
- Trexler Nature Preserve
