= Schnecksville, Pennsylvania =

Unincorporated community in Pennsylvania, US

- Census-designated place
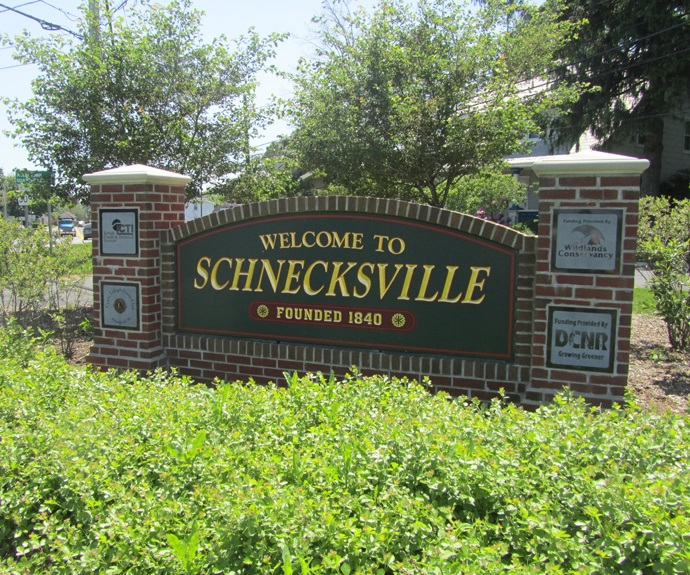
- Welcome sign in Schnecksville in June 2013

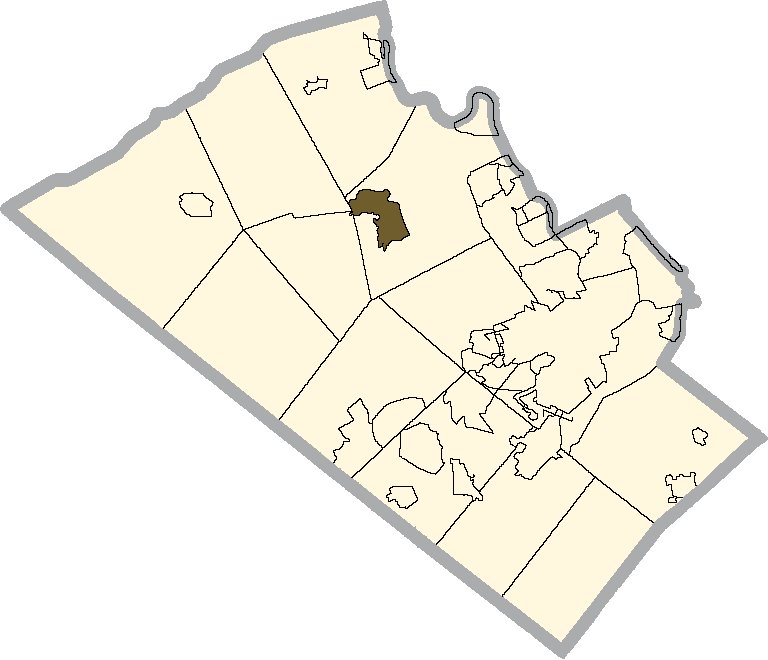
- Location of Schnecksville in Lehigh County, Pennsylvania

- Location of Schnecksville in Pennsylvania Location in the United States
- Coordinates: 40°40′13″N 75°36′29″W
- Country: United States
- State: Pennsylvania
- County: Lehigh
- Township: North Whitehall

Area
  - Census-designated place: 2.70 sq mi (6.99 km^{2})
  - Land: 2.69 sq mi (6.97 km^{2})
  - Water: 0.0077 sq mi (0.02 km^{2})
- Elevation: 668 ft (204 m)

Population (2010)
  - Census-designated place: 2,935
  - Density: 1,091/sq mi (421.3/km^{2})
  - Metro: 865,310 (US: 68th)
- Time zone: UTC-5 (EST)
  - Summer (DST): UTC-4 (EDT)
- ZIP Code: 18078
- Area codes: 610 and 484
- FIPS code: 42-68192
- GNIS feature ID: 1200116

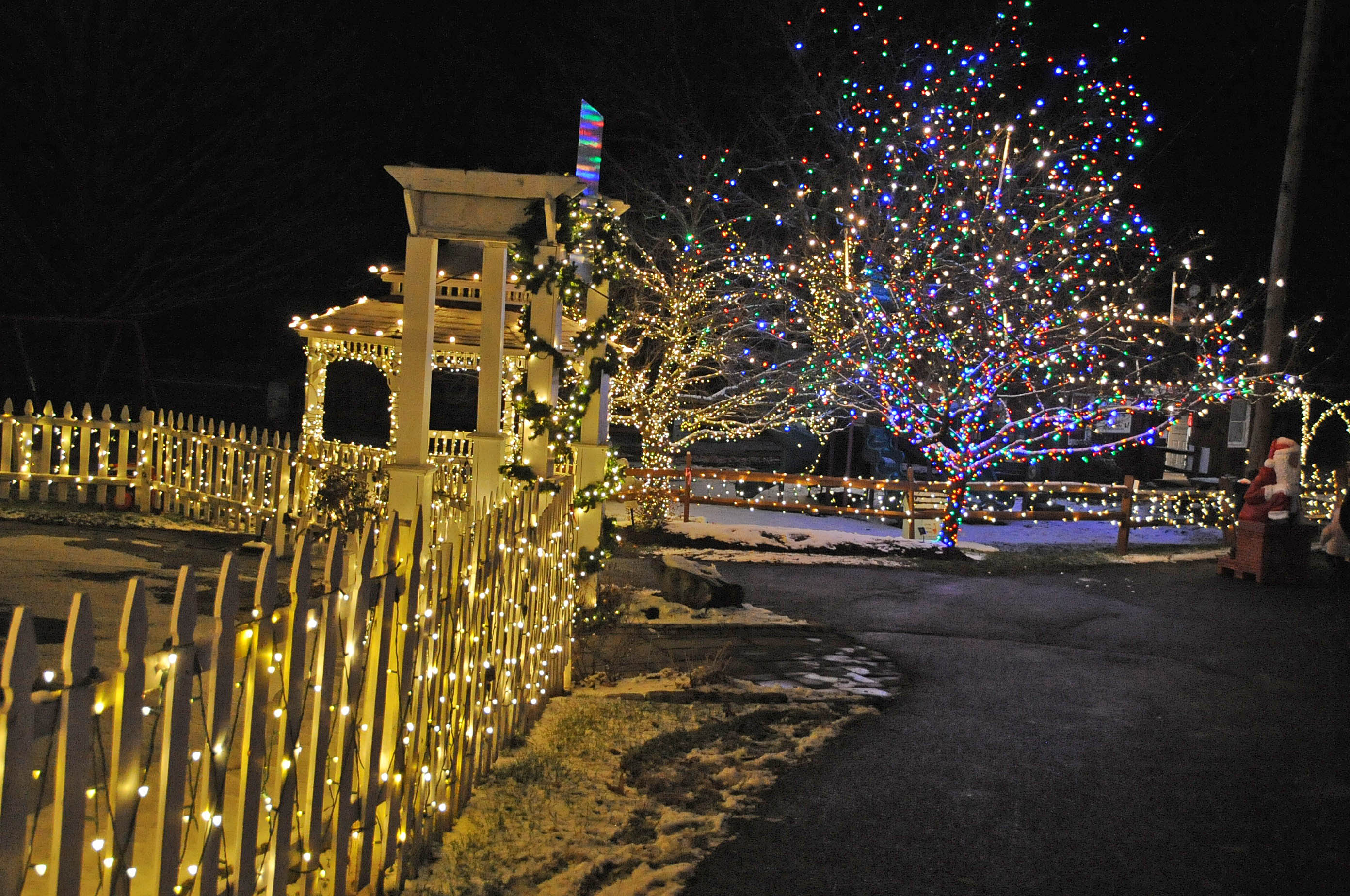
Christmas lights at Lehigh Valley Zoo in Schnecksville, December 2020

Schnecksville is an unincorporated community and census-designated place (CDP) in North Whitehall Township in Lehigh County, Pennsylvania, United States. The population of Schnecksville was 2,935 at the 2010 census.

Schnecksville is a suburb of Allentown in the Lehigh Valley metropolitan area of the United States, which had a population of 861,899 and was the 68th-most populous metropolitan area in the U.S. as of the 2020 census. Its U.S. postal code (ZIP code) is 18078.

== History ==
Schnecksville was settled in 1756 by Adam Schneck. His log home is still standing but has been moved approximately half a mile from its original location. In 1840, Schnecksville was laid out by Daniel Schneck. Descendants of the Schnecks still currently reside in the town. He and his son Moses Schneck owned a hotel and other buildings. George Rau opened a store in Schnecksville, and the post office was opened in 1846; Peter Gross was its first postmaster. In 1880, the population was 160 and there were two hotels, a store, 22 dwellings, a school, and a church.

== Geography ==
Schnecksville is located in northern Lehigh County at 40°40′33″N 75°36′59″W (40.675741, -75.616260), in the western part of North Whitehall Township.

Pennsylvania Route 309 runs through the middle of the community, leading south through Orefield 7 miles (11 km) to Interstate 78 on the west side of Allentown. To the northwest PA 309 leads through Pleasant Corners 24 miles (39 km) to Tamaqua. Pennsylvania Route 873 begins at PA 309 in Schnecksville and leads north through Neffs 6 miles (10 km) to Slatington. The Trexler Nature Preserve, which is also home to the Trexler Environmental Center and the Lehigh Valley Zoo, is on the southwest side of Schnecksville.

According to the U.S. Census Bureau, Schnecksville has a total area of 2.7 square miles (7.0 km^{2}), of which 0.01 square miles (0.02 km^{2}), or 0.28%, are water. Schnecksville sits on a ridge at an elevation of about 660 feet (200 m) above sea level. To the west, water flows to Jordan Creek, while to the east water flows to Coplay Creek. Both creeks are southeast-flowing tributaries of the Lehigh River and part of the Delaware River watershed.

== Lehigh Valley Zoo ==
Schnecksville is home to the Lehigh Valley Zoo, a 29-acre (11.7 ha) zoo that is open year-round.

== Schnecksville Community Fair ==
Every summer since 1981, a country fair is held in Schnecksville. In recent years, it has been held at the Schnecksville Fire Company on Pennsylvania Route 309, near the community's southern entrance. The Schnecksville Community Fair was not held in 2020 due to the COVID-19 pandemic.

== Demographics ==
Historical population
Census	Pop.	Note	%±
2000	2,664		—
2010	2,935		10.2%
2020	3,261		11.1%

=== 2020 census ===
As of the 2020 census, Schnecksville had a population of 3,261. The median age was 45.1 years. 21.1% of residents were under the age of 18 and 21.6% of residents were 65 years of age or older. For every 100 females there were 91.7 males, and for every 100 females age 18 and over there were 88.5 males age 18 and over.

96.6% of residents lived in urban areas, while 3.4% lived in rural areas.

There were 1,326 households in Schnecksville, of which 28.7% had children under the age of 18 living in them. Of all households, 58.0% were married-couple households, 14.3% were households with a male householder and no spouse or partner present, and 21.8% were households with a female householder and no spouse or partner present. About 21.6% of all households were made up of individuals and 11.3% had someone living alone who was 65 years of age or older.

There were 1,374 housing units, of which 3.5% were vacant. The homeowner vacancy rate was 0.8% and the rental vacancy rate was 5.0%.

Racial composition as of the 2020 census
Race	Number	Percent
White	2,906	89.1%
Black or African American	41	1.3%
American Indian and Alaska Native	7	0.2%
Asian	45	1.4%
Native Hawaiian and Other Pacific Islander	2	0.1%
Some other race	77	2.4%
Two or more races	183	5.6%
Hispanic or Latino (of any race)	223	6.8%

=== 2010 census ===
As of the 2010 census, there were 2,935 people, 1241 households, and 864 families residing in the CDP. The population density was 1,572.5 inhabitants per square mile (607.1/km^{2}). There were 738 housing units at an average density of 583.5 per square mile (225.3/km^{2}). The racial makeup of the CDP was 97.89% White, 0.35% African American, 0.10% Native American, 1.06% Asian, 0.50% from other races, and 0.10% from two or more races. Hispanic or Latino of any race were 1.21% of the population.

The ancestry of its residents is as follows: German (47.0%), Irish (10.0%), Italian (9.8%), English (9.2%), Welsh (7.1%), and Slovak (6.1%).

There were 715 households, out of which 43.1% had children under the age of 18 living with them, 73.8% were married couples living together, 7.4% had a female householder with no husband present, and 17.2% were non-families. 14.7% of all households were made up of individuals, and 5.2% had someone living alone who was 65 years of age or older. The average household size was 2.78 and the average family size was 3.09.

The population of Schnecksville was spread out, with 29.0% under the age of 18, 4.7% from 18 to 24, 28.9% from 25 to 44, 28.0% from 45 to 64, and 9.4% who were 65 years of age or older. The median age was 40 years. For every 100 females, there were 93.9 males. For every 100 females age 18 and over, there were 94.0 males. The median income for a household in the CDP was $74,808, and the median income for a family was $78,519. Males had a median income of $51,716 versus $35,714 for females. The per capita income for the CDP was $27,533. About 1.2% of families and 1.3% of the population were below the poverty line, including 1.5% of those under age 18 and none of those age 65 or over.

== Education ==
=== Primary education ===
The community is served by Parkland School District and Northwestern Lehigh School Districts. Most students in grades nine through twelve attend Parkland High School in the Parkland School District. Lehigh Career and Technical Institute, a vocational school of Lehigh Valley students, also is located in Schnecksville.

=== Community college ===
Schnecksville is home to one of three campuses of Lehigh Carbon Community College, also known LCCC, or "L-tri-C", a public community college with approximately 9,000 full and part-time students as of 2022.
