= Spring Creek (Little Lehigh Creek tributary) =

Tributary of Little Lehigh Creek in eastern Pennsylvania

Coordinates: 40°32′01″N 75°35′58″W

Spring Creek is a 1.0-mile-long (1.6 km) tributary of Little Lehigh Creek in the Lehigh Valley region of eastern Pennsylvania.

It is formed by the confluences of Schaefer Run and Iron Run at Mosser Spring near Trexlertown. Spring Creek joins Little Lehigh Creek several miles upstream from Emmaus in Lehigh County.

== Tributaries ==
- Schaefer Run
- Iron Run

== See also ==
- List of rivers of Pennsylvania
