= Northwestern Lehigh School District =

School district in Pennsylvania, US

Location
- 6493 Route 309 New Tripoli, Pennsylvania, 18066; United States
- Coordinates: 40.6520°N 75.7356°W

District information
- Type: Public
- Grades: K–12th
- Established: 1950
- Superintendent: Jennifer Holman
- Schools: 4
- Budget: $49.017 million
- NCES District ID: 4217850

Students and staff
- Students: 1,924 (2024-25)
- Teachers: 148.66 (on an FTE basis)
- Student–teacher ratio: 12.94
- Athletic conference: Colonial League
- District mascot: Tigers
- Colors: Black and Gold

Other information
- Website: www.nwlehighsd.org

Northwestern Lehigh School District is a public school district in northwest Lehigh County, Pennsylvania in the Lehigh Valley region of eastern Pennsylvania. It serves Heidelberg, Lowhill, Lynn, and Weisenberg Townships.

As of the 2024–25 school year, the district had an enrollment of 1,924 students between its four schools, according to National Center for Education Statistics data. It has two elementary schools, Weisenberg Elementary and Northwestern Lehigh Elementary, one middle school, and one high school, Northwestern Lehigh High School in New Tripoli. All schools offer gifted programs and special education programs.

In 2004–2005, the Northwestern Lehigh School District completed a Facility Master Plan (FMP) to analyze and document the status of all District facilities. The purpose of the FMP was to determine the extent, priority, and estimated costs of much needed facility repairs. Based on this study, the district engaged the help of many employees and community members to prioritize the needed repairs, renovations, and construction, and align this work with District resources.

The mascot is a tiger and their school colors are black and gold. The high school is known colloquially as "Corncob High", a reflection of the surrounding farmland.

== High school ==
Northwestern Lehigh High School was built in 1950. Prior to the construction of the high school building, students attended either Parkland High School in Allentown or Kutztown Area High School in Kutztown.

Over the years, the school has undergone several additions, the most recent being in 2007–2008. Starting in the 2009–2010 school year and completing in the 2010–2011 school year, the high school received major renovations to its interior structure. Several new classrooms were added and most of the buildings classrooms and facilities were updated. A new guidance suite, school store, media center/library are just some of the new additions to the high school. The school offers an Advanced Placement program. Upon completion of advanced placement courses, students may take a test administered by College Board and may be eligible to receive college credits for the course work.

A new gymnasium and fifth grade wing was added onto the elementary school, and the fifth grade moved down to the elementary school due to the lack of space in the middle school.

== Middle school ==
The middle school began construction in 1991 to relieve overcrowding. It was completed in the summer of 1992. Prior to its completion, middle school students attended the high school building. In 2005, a new addition containing science labs was constructed. In 2006, the fifth grade was moved to the elementary buildings, and the middle school developed the philosophy of "teaming". Six teams were developed, two per grade level. In 2014 the class of 2020 were given Chromebooks to carry around to further expand their education and help make projects easier.

6th Grade	7th Grade	8th Grade
Pathfinders	Mosaic	Visionaries
Explorers	Roar	Lynx

=== Pathfinders ===
- Grade: 6th
- Symbol: Lantern
- Motto: "Pathfinders... Leading the Way"
- Color: Purple

=== Explorers ===
- Grade: 6th
- Symbol: Compass
- Motto: "Searching for Excellence"
- Color: Green

=== Roar ===
Before the 2012–2013 school year, Team Roar was one of the eighth grade teams, along with Team Lynx. They had to make Roar a seventh grade team because the graduating class of 2018 needed the bigger lockers because they had too many students.

- Grade: 7th
- Symbol: Paw print
- Motto: "Don't Just Make Your Mark, Leave Tracks"
- Color: Orange

=== Mosaic ===
- Grade: 7th
- Symbol: Puzzle piece
- Motto: "Shaping the Pieces of Our World... Together"
- Color: Orange

=== Lynx ===
- Grade: 8th
- Symbol: Lynx
- Motto: "Leadership Yields New Experiences" (LYNX)
- Color: Gold

=== Visionaries ===
Before the 2012–2013 school year, Team Visionaries was one of the seventh grade teams, along with Team Mosaic.

- Grade: 8th
- Symbol: Delta
- Motto: "Quest for Wisdom, Purpose, and Strength"
- Color: Red

=== Administration ===
- Principal: William Dovico
- Assistant Principal: Amy Wahl

== Elementary schools ==
Northwestern Lehigh School District is home to two elementary schools: Northwestern Lehigh Elementary, which is located on the main campus along with the high school and middle school, and Weisenberg Elementary, which is approximately 8 miles south.

=== Administration ===
- Northwestern Elementary Principal: Krista Keys
- Weisenberg Elementary Principal: Jill Berlet

== Morning Show ==
The school is home to The Morning Show, a school news program broadcast via closed circuit television through the district. The show was brought to life by students. A live web stream of the show is available at: The Morning Show Live Stream. The Morning Show is produced in the studio, where the radio show is also developed. The Morning Show also contains a side segment called "Weekend Weather", in which one of the hosts performs a laid back, non-scripted version of a weather forecast.

== Tiger TV ==
Tiger TV is the middle school's news program, like the high school's Morning Show. It is produced by a few eighth graders of each graduating class with the help of teachers. It is shot live, every school morning in a studio room located in the 'new wing'. Tiger TV started in the 2006–2007 school year with the class of 2011.

== Tiger Vision ==
Tiger Vision is an elementary school version of Morning Show produced by select fifth graders and shot live once a week. A different group of fifth graders star in it every week. At Weisenberg Elementary, the program is called Tiger Time and is produced weekly.

== Athletics ==
In November 2024, the district's only high school, Northwestern Lehigh High School, won the state's Division 3A championship in high school football.

== Notable alumni ==
- Carson Kressley, former fashion expert, Queer Eye
- Kyle Thrash, Emmy Award-winning director, The Turnaround on Netflix
