= Harry Clay Trexler =

American businessman (1854–1933)

Harry C. Trexler
- Trexler in 1921
- Born: April 17, 1854; Easton, Pennsylvania, U.S.
- Died: November 17, 1933 (aged 79); Easton, Pennsylvania, U.S.
- Occupation(s): Industrialist, businessman, and philanthropist
- Spouse: Mary Mosser Trexler (m. 1885)
- Parents: Edwin Trexler; Matilda (Sauerbeck) Trexler

Signature
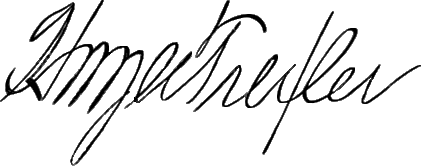

Henry Clay Trexler (April 17, 1854 – November 17, 1933) was an American industrialist, businessman, and major philanthropist who contributed to the economic development of Allentown, Pennsylvania and the surrounding Lehigh Valley in the late 19th and early 20th centuries. He bequeathed the majority of his estate to create the Harry C. Trexler Trust, which has since dispensed more than $150 million in Lehigh County, Pennsylvania.

== Early life and education ==
Trexler was born in Easton, Pennsylvania to Edwin (1826–1900) and Matilda (Sauerbeck) Trexler (1827–1914). In the 1860 U.S. Census, Trexler's full name appears as Henry C. Trexler. But in the 1870 census, his name appears as Harry, the name he would use for the rest of his life.

Trexler was the eldest of four brothers. His siblings were William Trexler (1856–1862), who died in childhood, Edwin Trexler (1858–1939), and Frank Trexler (1861-1947). In 1885, Trexler married Mary M. Mosser. They were married for 48 years until Trexler's death on November 17, 1933, from injuries sustained in an automobile accident. Trexler's wife Mary died one year later. They had no children.

In the 1850s, Trexler's father Edwin moved the family to their ancestral farm near Emmaus, Pennsylvania, where Trexler's father joined his two brothers in starting a lumber business. While in Emmaus, Trexler developed his lifelong interest in agriculture, horsemanship, and nature. In 1866, at age 12, he won a third place honor "for the best corn fed hogs" at the Great Allentown Fair, one the nation's longest-running city fairs.

Trexler acquired his early education at Henninger's School House in Emmaus and later at Allentown High School. During the 1869–1870 school year, Trexler attended the one-year preparatory school Tremont Seminary in Norristown, a non-sectarian private school. The curriculum consisted of "Spelling, Reading, Writing, English Composition, English Grammar, Elocution, Rhetoric, Logic… Arithmetic, Bookkeeping, and Practical Accountantship," according to its documents registered with the county's historical society. It was the capstone of his formal education, and it was probably at this time that Trexler developed a lifelong passion for books, book collecting, and reading on a daily basis.

== Career ==
Trexler depicted in the newspaper Newspaper Artists Club in 1911

=== Trexler Lumber Company ===
One of Trexler's major business ventures was Trexler Lumber Company, founded by Harry Trexler's father and two uncles in 1856. Eventually the uncles sold out of the company. By 1876, Harry Trexler was working in the firm. Following his father's retirement, Trexler assumed full control of the enterprise. Trexler Lumber was involved in logging, milling, and the retail sale of lumber products.

With headquarters in Allentown, the company maintained branch and sales offices in New York City, Norfolk, Virginia, Sumter, South Carolina, Mississippi, and Jacksonville, Florida. Its major distribution yards were in Newark, New Jersey, and Allentown. Over the duration of its existence, Trexler Lumber conducted lumber operations in Pennsylvania, South Carolina, Prentiss, Mississippi, and several other states. One of their major logging sites was in Ricketts, Pennsylvania, where the company harvested 500 million board feet of lumber over 20 years, from 1890 to 1910.

In 1900, Trexler's father was killed in Emmaus, Pennsylvania, when his horse and wagon were run over by a train, and Harry Trexler inherited his father's fortune.

=== Lehigh Portland Cement ===
Trexler served as the first chief executive officer of Lehigh Portland Cement, which was officially incorporated on November 26, 1897. The company was founded with eleven stockholders and 4,000 shares of stock; Trexler owned fifty percent of the stock. Lehigh Portland produced cement during an era of unprecedented economic growth in both Allentown, its surrounding Lehigh Valley region, and the nation. Producing cement for major dams, highways, bridges, and many prominent structures, Lehigh Portland became a major industrial corporation in the nation. By 1925, the company was operating approximately 20 cement plants in numerous states. In 1924, Lehigh Portland Cement set its historical production record, produced 16.5 million barrels of Lehigh Cement, the largest year's output ever produced at that time by any one cement manufacturer.

=== Trexler Farms ===
Trexler Farms was one of Harry C. Trexler's many agricultural pursuits. He bought and merged dozens of farms in Lehigh County to acquire acreage for fruit orchards. By 1932, Trexler Orchards included in excess of 1,800 acres in Lehigh County. At the time of his 1933 death, Trexler Orchards included 36,000 apple trees, 30,000 peach trees, and 5,000 cherry, plum, and pear trees.

The orchards represented only a fraction of his farming operation. During the 1920s and 1930s, Trexler Farms was a major producer of potatoes, wheat, corn, and oats. It also raised sheep, cattle, and chickens. Between 1916 and 1933, Harry Trexler purchased an additional 41 farms in Lowhill Township and Trexlertown, which were merged to establish a cattle ranch. Trexler acquired over 200 farms over his lifetime.

=== Pennsylvania Power and Light ===
Harry C. Trexler was part of a small group of five founding directors of the Pennsylvania Power and Light Company, later renamed PP&L and now PPL Corporation, in Allentown. At the time of its founding, electric utilities were entering a consolidation phase. In 1920, Pennsylvania Power and Light was formed as a holding company including eight smaller utilities. "Trexler also got involved early in the building of utility infrastructure of the Lehigh Valley," author Bill Beck wrote in his biography on PPL. One of Trexler's ventures was the Lehigh Valley Traction Company, a trolley company that generated more electricity than it used. In 1920, Trexler started Lehigh Light & Power, which was merged into PP&L upon its founding. By 1928, Trexler's stature and influence at PP&L allowed him to assume the lead role in selecting John Wise as the company's second president.

Trexler's personal aide and secretary for 17 years, Nolan Benner (1893-1980), recorded Trexler's significant role in PP&L history: "The General’s persuasion and engaging manner won the controversy (about locating PP&L’s headquarters) and the new building was constructed on the northwest corner of Ninth and Hamilton." After the PPL Building opened in Allentown as PP&L's corporate headquarters in 1928, Trexler accepted an offer to move his personal offices into the building, occupying half of its twelfth floor.

== Pennsylvania National Guard ==
On June 8, 1895, Trexler enrolled in military service as a lieutenant colonel in the Pennsylvania National Guard and an aide to Pennsylvania governor Robert E. Pattison. During his Pennsylvania National Guard service, Trexler was mustered into federal duty at the Mexican Border on July 9, 1916, and during World War I on July 16, 1917.

Trexler's long-time secretary and personal aide Nolan Benner recorded in his memoir, "The General had a splendid military bearing and was a statuesque figure on his white charger (horse) Jack O’Diamonds." That military bearing was valued on numerous occasions as he was appointed aide-de-camp and lieutenant colonel, then assistant commissary general of subsistence, to full colonel and quartermaster general for the Pennsylvania National Guard on January 24, 1911. Upon retirement Trexler was discharged from the National Guard with the rank of brigadier general on April 22, 1918.

== Conservation ==
Harry Trexler was an early conservationist. He understood the importance of nature and the preservation of wildlife in its natural habitat.

=== Trexler Game Preserve and bison ===
After American bison had been nearly driven to extinction, Trexler took an active role in 1911 to save the species. He bought farmsteads in Lowhill Township and North Whitehall Township in Lehigh County and created a game preserve for bison. Eventually, Trexler bought approximately 1,170 acres to devote to the animals’ survival. He soon added elk and deer to the preserve. When Trexler died in 1933, the preserve passed to the ownership of Lehigh County, which assumed title in 1935 and has been in control of the land since.

=== Allentown Trout Hatchery ===
Trexler acquired a trout hatchery in Allentown around 1907. His love of the outdoors offered him an opportunity to enhance his interest while developing yet another commercial endeavor. Over the years, Trexler enlarged, modernized, and developed the trout hatchery into a productive enterprise. What started as a hobby developed into a thriving enterprise. With the additional development of Hickory Run streams 50 miles north of Allentown, Trexler was able to sell his trout and had his own private preserve to test and enjoy newer approaches to farming.

=== Hickory Run State Park ===
Trexler was an avid outdoorsman; he treasured trout angling and hunting. Fifty miles north of Allentown in Kidder Township, approximately six miles east of White Haven, lies Hickory Run State Park, which Trexler purchased in January 1918. An extensive forested region, the area was once devastated by unregulated logging and bark peeling in the 1820s.

By 1839, there were six lumber mills operating on Hickory Run ("run" is a colloquial term used in its description, meaning stream). Lack of regulation led to overharvesting, wildfires, and destruction of mountainside terrain. The area suffered from erosion, forest fire damage, and land destruction. By 1900, however, the forest started rejuvenating, regrowing, and once again flourishing.

In 1920, Trexler told those who questioned his interest: "In the not too distant future, men will be working shorter hours and they will have more leisure time...I would like to see Hickory Run developed into a State Park where the families can come and enjoy wholesome recreation." According to park officials, recent calculations estimate visitation at Hickory Run State Park to average 300,000 visitors annually. The bulk of the lands that constitute the State Park was sold to the federal government in 1937 and 1938 by the Trexler estate. Writing in his memoirs, Nolan Benner, executor of the estate, recorded: "In my letter to the government I stated the following":

The Hickory Run lands would be ideally located for either a government or state park...It took General Trexler 25 years to buy up these various tracts, and it would be impossible for our own state or the government to purchase such a large tract, free of encumbrances so peculiarly suited for public park purposes.

Hickory Run State Park today boasts 15,990 acres of recreational land with over 40 miles of trails and trout streams.

== Death ==
On November 16, 1933, Trexler's automobile collided with a broken down truck on the William Penn Highway in Wilson, Pennsylvania. Trexler died from his injuries the following morning.

== Philanthropy ==
Trexler's philanthropy continues through Harry C. Trexler Trust, which is based in Allentown.

=== Children ===
Trexler and his wife Mary sponsored Romper Day, first held in 1914. Held annually, Romper Day marked the close of organized summer activities at Allentown's playgrounds. Children from the city's playgrounds gathered for track events and demonstrations of various dances and drills along with their parents and community members. The Trexlers organized workers to carry out the details and provided funds for transportation and refreshments for thousands of children, parents, and friends. Because of the Trexlers’ support, this event is still held annually in Allentown.

Trexler's financial support of the Boy Scouts dates back to 1916 when Scouting was just beginning its development in the U.S. In one instance, Trexler outfitted an entire troop of 50 boys with "uniforms, tents and other equipment, all first class." He supported Scouting in many ways, including purchasing approximately 800 acres of land that became known as the Trexler Scout Reservation.

=== Allentown public parks ===
Trexler is acknowledged as a father of Allentown's public parks. The Allentown Planning Commission in a detailed 1964 report on their parks wrote that, "...these parks are a living memorial to General Harry Clay Trexler." Allentown's park system was launched with West Park in Allentown's West End, which opened in 1908 and was developed with funding from Trexler and landscaping by Philadelphia architect J. Franklin Meehan. In 1931, Trexler donated over 31 acres of his trout hatchery property, which eventually formed part of Allentown's Little Lehigh Parkway, and additional landowners followed Trexler's lead.

Allentown eventually received additional Trexler properties that enlarged the city's park system. Since Trexler's death, the Harry C. Trexler Trust has awarded more than $50 million to support Allentown's parks and is a support for ongoing private funding of the city's sizable public park system.

== Legacy ==
In 2001, the National Commission on Entrepreneurship issued a report recognizing "entrepreneurial giants" of 1917. Trexler was included on the list due to role in the forming the Lehigh Portland Cement Company, once ranked as the largest cement manufacturer in the world. The listing of 27 American entrepreneurs also included such business icons as George Eastman, Henry Ford, and Harvey Samuel Firestone, all of whom were designated "entrepreneurial giants of American business."

=== Harry C. Trexler Trust ===
Since its creation, the Trexler Trust has granted in excess of $150 million in funding, "including more than $51 million to the City of Allentown for 'improvements, extension and maintenance of all its parks.'" With more than $130 million in assets, the trust distributes several million dollars annually. Trexler's longtime aide and secretary Nolan Benner once recorded, "He will be cited as the man who—with a generous spirit and a sagacious foresight—bequeathed for the improvement of his fellowmen the accumulated earnings of his life."
