= Jordan Creek (Pennsylvania) =

Jordan Creek Hollenbach in Pennsylvania Dutch language
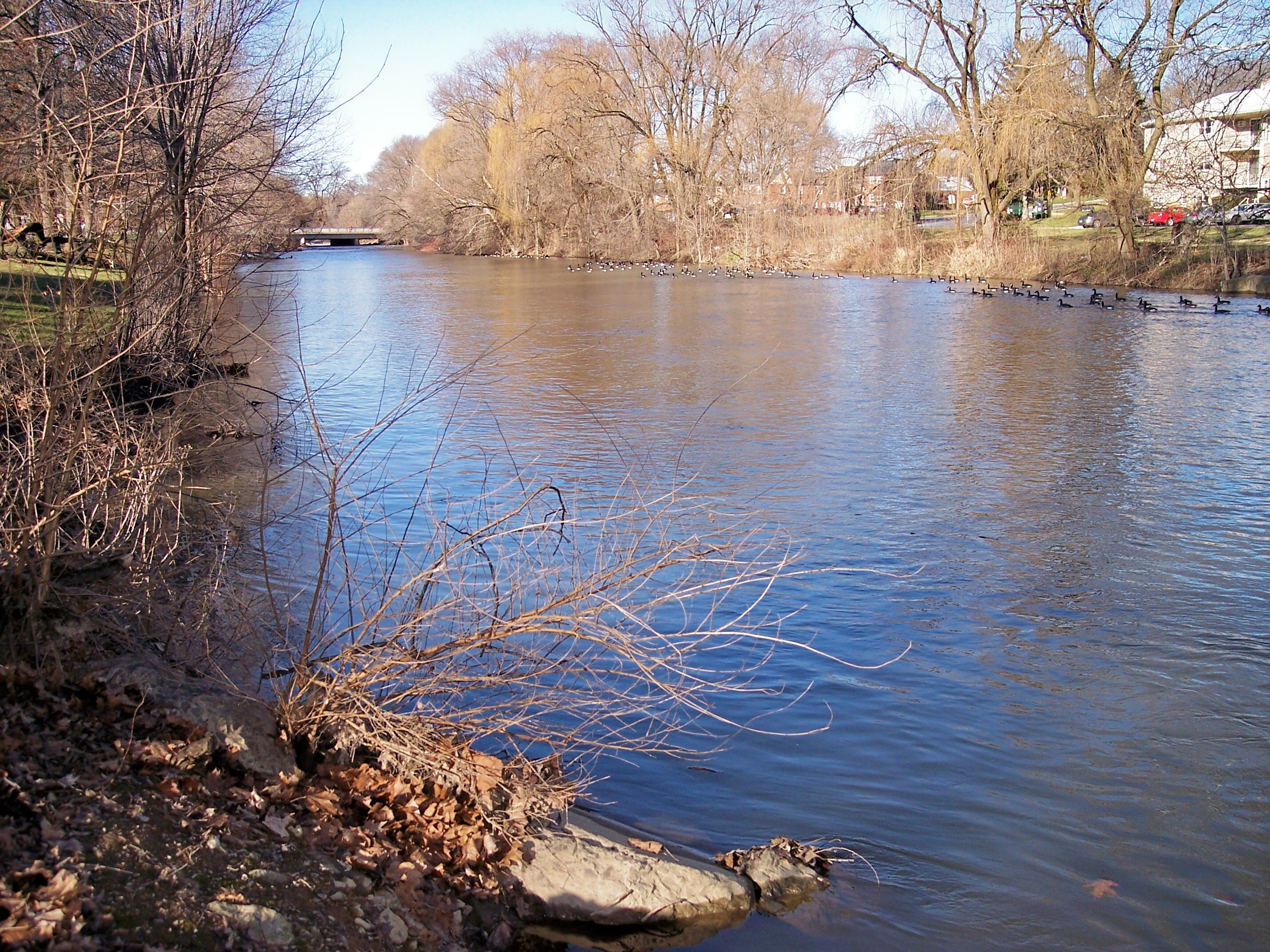
- Jordan Creek in Allentown in January 2007

Location
- Country: United States
- State: Pennsylvania
- County: Lehigh
- City: Allentown, Pennsylvania, U.S.

Physical characteristics
- Source
  - location: Heidelberg Township, Lehigh County
  - coordinates: 40°44′01″N 75°44′08″W
- Mouth: Little Lehigh Creek
  - location: Allentown, Lehigh County
  - coordinates: 40°36′04″N 75°27′41″W
- Length: 34.1 mi (54.9 km)
- Basin size: 75.8 mi^{2} (196 km^{2})
- Discharge
  - location: Allentown
  - average: 157 cu ft/s (4.4 m^{3}/s)
  - minimum: 8.7 cu ft/s (0.25 m^{3}/s)
  - maximum: 1,390 cu ft/s (39 m^{3}/s)

Jordan Creek (Pennsylvania Dutch: Hollenbach) is a 34.1-mile-long (54.9 km) tributary of Little Lehigh Creek in Lehigh County, Pennsylvania.

== Geography ==
Jordan Creek arises from a natural spring on Blue Mountain. The spring is located downhill from the Bake Oven Knob shelter on the Appalachian Trail in Heidelberg Township in Lehigh County. The water course then flows intermittently downhill past Mountain Road, carrying further south through Heidelberg Township and passing through the Trexler Nature Preserve in Schnecksville.

Jordan Creek joins Little Lehigh Creek in Allentown before soon flowing into the Lehigh River. It drains an area of 75.8 square miles (196 km^{2}).

Along with Bethlehem, Egypt, and Emmaus, Jordan Creek is one several Lehigh Valley locations whose name was inspired by locations referenced in the Bible.

== Tributaries ==
- Elk Ridge Run
- Haasadahl Creek
- Hegel's Run
- Macintosh Run
- Mill Creek
- Schantz Valley Creek
- Switzer Creek
- Thicket Run

== See also ==
- List of rivers of Pennsylvania
- Trexler Nature Preserve
