= Lowhill Township, Pennsylvania =

Township in Pennsylvania, US

Lowhill Township
- Township
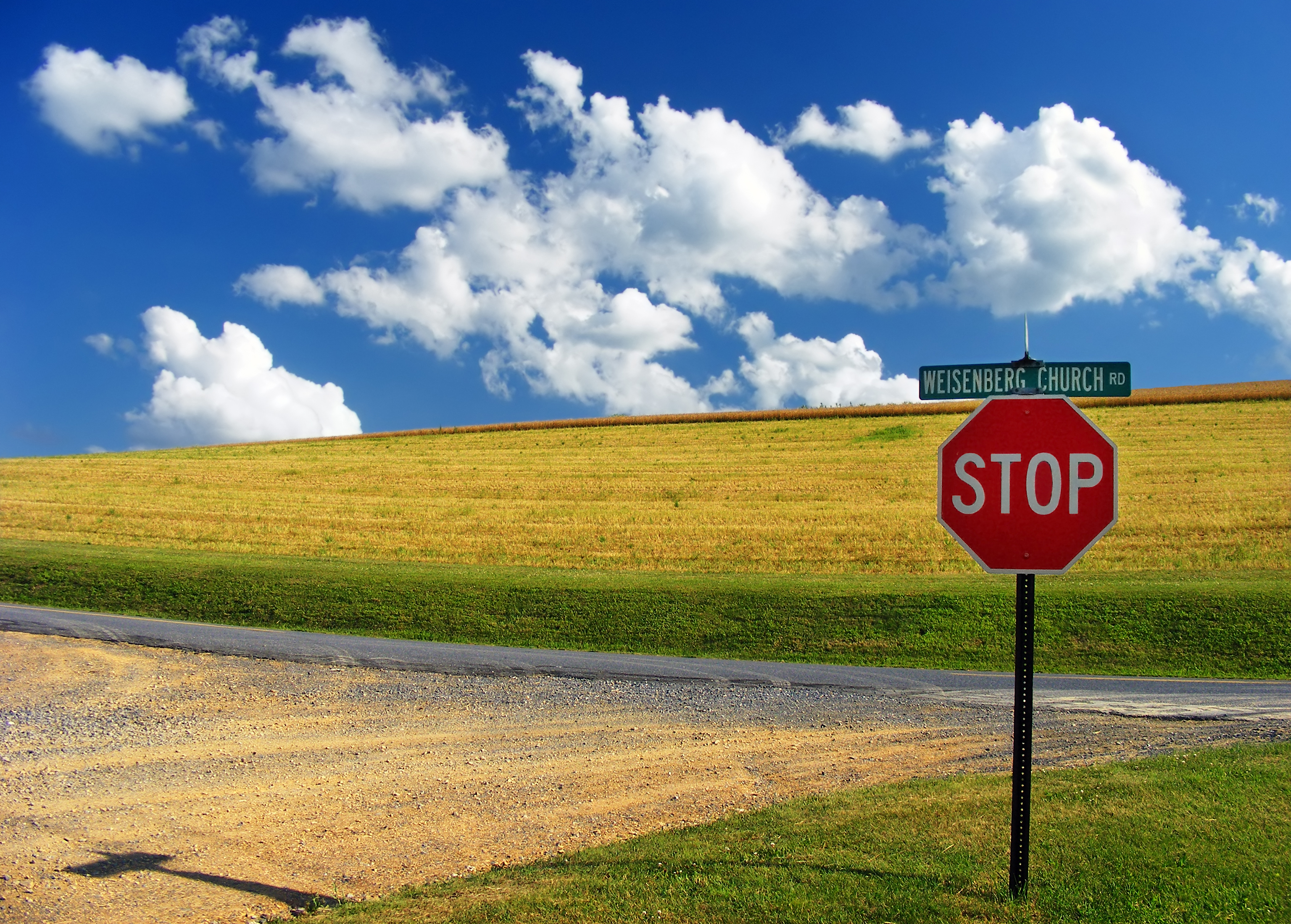
- Lowhill Township in July 2009

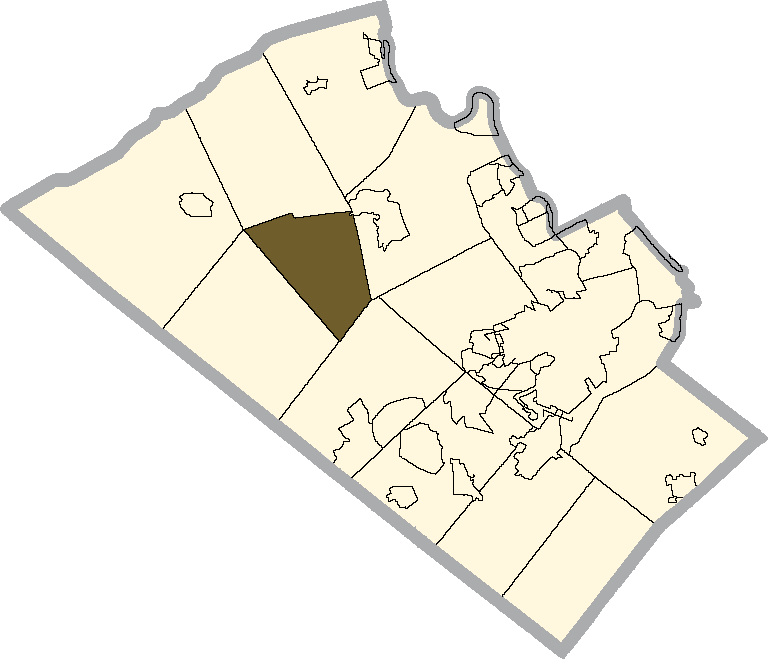
- Location of Lowhill Township in Lehigh County, Pennsylvania

- Location of Lowhill Township in Pennsylvania Location in the United States
- Coordinates: 40°37′26″N 75°37′25″W
- Country: United States
- State: Pennsylvania
- County: Lehigh

Area
  - Township: 14.12 sq mi (36.57 km^{2})
  - Land: 14.02 sq mi (36.30 km^{2})
  - Water: 0.11 sq mi (0.28 km^{2})
- Elevation: 633 ft (193 m)

Population (2010)
  - Township: 2,173
  - Estimate (2016): 2,275
  - Density: 162.3/sq mi (62.68/km^{2})
  - Metro: 865,310 (US: 68th)
- Time zone: UTC-5 (EST)
  - Summer (DST): UTC-4 (EDT)
- Area code: 610
- FIPS code: 42-077-45168
- GNIS feature ID: 1216691
- Primary airport: Lehigh Valley International Airport
- Major hospital: Lehigh Valley Hospital–Cedar Crest
- School district: Northwestern Lehigh
- Website: lowhilltwp.org

Lowhill Township is a township in Lehigh County, Pennsylvania, United States. The population of Lowhill Township was 2,173 at the 2010 census. It is a suburb of Allentown, in the Lehigh Valley, which had a population of 861,899 and was the 68th-most populous metropolitan area in the U.S. as of the 2020 census.

== Geography ==
The township is northwest of the center of Lehigh County. According to the U.S. Census Bureau, the township has a total area of 14.1 square miles (36.6 km^{2}), of which 14.0 square miles (36.3 km^{2}) are land and 0.1 square miles (0.3 km^{2}), or 0.76%, are water. It is drained by Jordan Creek into the Lehigh River. Its villages include Claussville, Leather Corner Post, Lowhill, Lyon Valley, and Weidasville.

=== Adjacent municipalities ===
- North Whitehall Township (east)
- Heidelberg Township (north)
- Lynn Township (tangent to the northwest)
- Weisenberg Township (southwest)
- Upper Macungie Township (southeast)
- South Whitehall Township (tangent to the east)

=== Climate ===
Lowhill has a hot-summer humid continental climate (Dfa) and the hardiness zone is 6b. Average monthly temperatures in Weidasville range from 28.2 °F (−2.1 °C) in January to 73.0 °F (22.8 °C) in July.

== Transportation ==
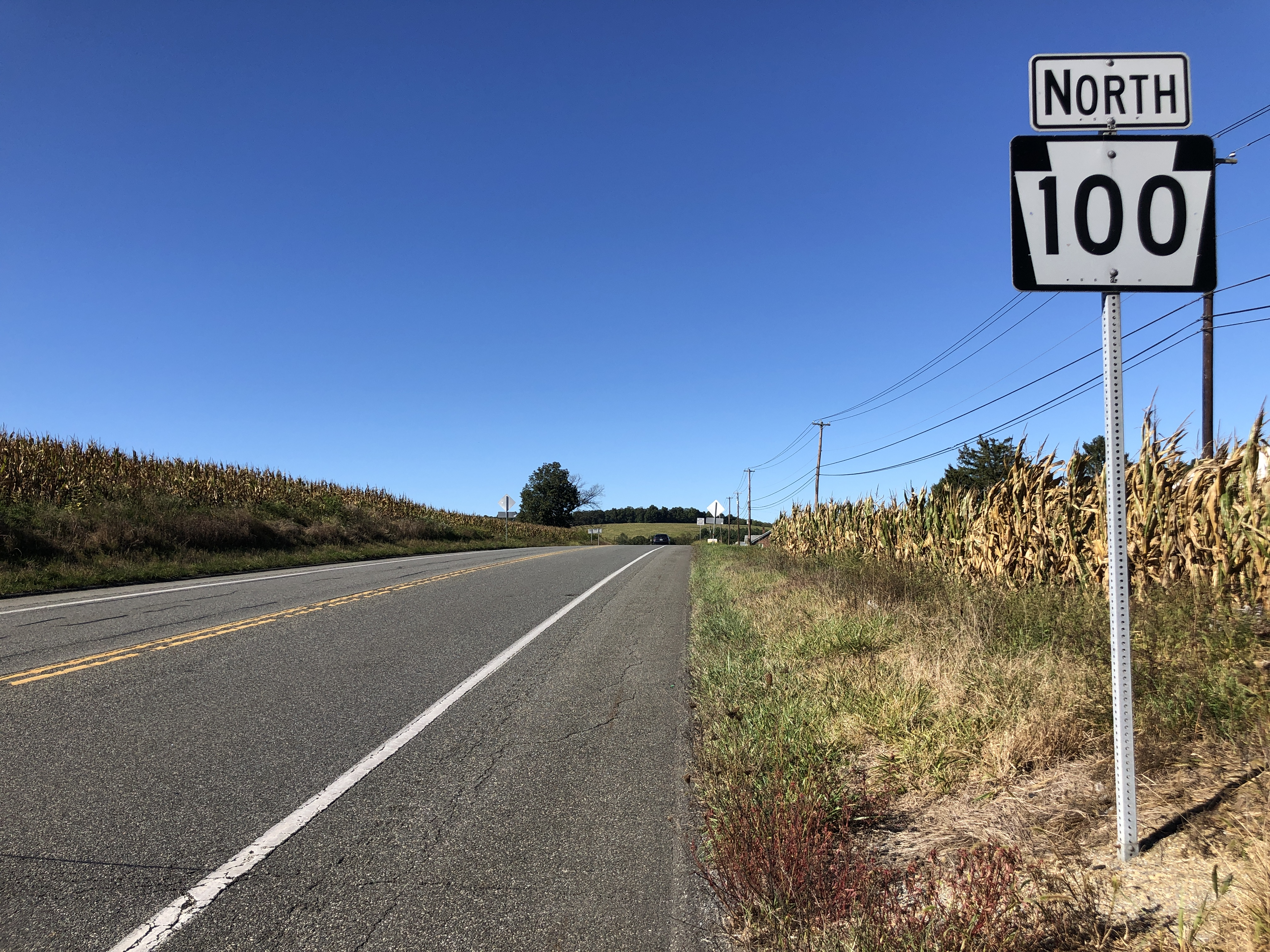
PA Route 100 North in Lowhill Township

As of 2021, there were 64.55 miles (103.88 km) of public roads in Lowhill Township, of which 21.09 miles (33.94 km) were maintained by the Pennsylvania Department of Transportation (PennDOT) and 43.46 miles (69.94 km) were maintained by the township.

Pennsylvania Route 100 is the only numbered highway traversing Lowhill Township. It follows a southeast–northwest alignment across the southern and western parts of the township.

== Demographics ==
As of the 2000 census, there were 1,869 people, 677 households, and 563 families residing in the township. The population density was 133.6 inhabitants per square mile (51.6/km^{2}). There were 703 housing units at an average density of 50.2 units per square mile (19.4 units/km^{2}). The racial makeup of the township was 97.70% White, 0.32% African American, 0.11% Native American, 0.32% Asian, 0.32% from other races, and 1.23% from two or more races. Hispanic or Latino of any race were 1.02% of the population.

Historical population
Census	Pop.	Note	%±
2000	1,869		—
2010	2,173		16.3%
2016 (est.)	2,275		4.7%
U.S. Decennial Census

There were 677 households, out of which 37.4% had children under the age of 18 living with them, 74.7% were married couples living together, 5.5% had a female householder with no husband present, and 16.8% were non-families. 13.6% of all households were made up of individuals, and 5.6% had someone living alone who was 65 years of age or older. The average household size was 2.76 and the average family size was 3.04.

In the township, the population was spread out, with 25.7% under the age of 18, 5.5% from 18 to 24, 28.1% from 25 to 44, 28.6% from 45 to 64, and 12.0% who were 65 years of age or older. The median age was 41 years. For every 100 females, there were 100.3 males. For every 100 females age 18 and over, there were 97.7 males. The median income for a household in the township was $63,421, and the median income for a family was $67,188. Males had a median income of $46,563 versus $38,083 for females. The per capita income for the township was $28,317. About 2.3% of families and 3.5% of the population were below the poverty line, including 4.4% of those under age 18 and 6.5% of those age 65 or over.

United States presidential election results for Lowhill Township, Pennsylvania
Year	Republican		Democratic		Third party(ies)	
Year	No.	%	No.	%	No.	%
2024	978	63.38%	550	35.64%	15	0.97%
2020	939	62.23%	557	36.91%	13	0.86%
2016	833	64.32%	416	32.12%	46	3.55%
2012	777	65.24%	403	33.84%	11	0.92%
2008	730	60.43%	465	38.49%	13	1.08%
2004	726	64.88%	382	34.14%	11	0.98%

== Education ==
The township is served by the Northwestern Lehigh School District.
