= Crowther =

Crowther is a surname, derived from the old Welsh musical instrument the crwth. Notable people with the surname include:

- Arnold Crowther (1909–1974), English stage-magician, puppeteer, and promoter of Wicca religion
- Antony Crowther (born 1965), British computer programmer
- Bosley Crowther (1905–1981), American film critic
- Charles Crowther (1831–1894), Australian politician (Western Australia)
- Edward Lodewyk Crowther (1843–1931), Australian politician (Tasmania), son of William Lodewyk Crowther
- Emlyn Crowther (born 1949), New Zealand drummer
- Eunice Crowther (1916–1986), British singer, dancer, and choreographer
- Frank Crowther (1870–1955), Member of US House of Representatives
- Geoffrey Crowther, Baron Crowther (1907–1972), editor of The Economist
- Hal Crowther (born 1945), American journalist and essayist
- Hilton Crowther (1879–1957), English mill owner and football club chairman
- J. S. Crowther (1820–93), English architect
- James Crowther (1899–1983), English science writer
- James Arnold Crowther (1883–1950), British physicist
- John Edward Crowther (1863–1931), English mill owner and philanthropist
- Jonathan Crowther (1942), British crossword compiler
- Jonathan Crowther (general), Orange Free State Boer war general
- Jonathan Crowther (minister) (1794–1856), English Wesleyan Methodist minister in Britain and India
- Leslie Crowther (1933–1996), English comedian
- Liz Crowther (born 1954), English actress
- Michael Crowther (born 1952), American conservationist
- Patricia Crowther (caver) (born 1943), American cave explorer
- Patricia Crowther (Wiccan) (1927–2025), British occultist, promoter of Wicca religion
- Paul Crowther (born 1953), English professor of philosophy
- Robert Crowther (born 1987), Australian long jumper
- Robert Crowther (author) (born 1948), author, illustrator, and paper engineer
- Samuel Ajayi Crowther (1809–1891), Nigerian bishop
- Stan Crowther (footballer) (1935–2014), English footballer
- Stanley Crowther (1925–2013), English politician
- Steve Crowther (born 1957), English politician
- Susan Crowther, professor of midwifery
- Thomas Crowther (priest) (1794–1859), English clergyman
- Thomas Crowther (ecologist) (born 1986), British ecologist
- Thomas Crowther (judge) (born 1970), British judge
- Welles Crowther (1977–2001), American equities trader and volunteer firefighter known for saving lives during the 9/11 attacks
- William Crowther (programmer) (born 1936), American computer programmer
- William Crowther (Australian politician) (1817–1885), Australian politician, father of Edward Lodewyk Crowther
- William Crowther (New Zealand politician) (1834–1900), New Zealand politician

== See also ==
- Crowther, New South Wales, a locality in Australia
- W. L. Crowther Library, at the State Library of Tasmania
