= Thomas Crowther =

Thomas Crowther may refer to:

- Thomas Crowther (priest) (1794–1859), evangelical clergyman in the Church of England
- Thomas Crowther (judge) (born 1970), British judge, who currently serves as a circuit judge
- Thomas Crowther (ecologist) (born 1986), British scientist
