= North Hills, Pennsylvania =

Unincorporated community in Pennsylvania, US

- Unincorporated community
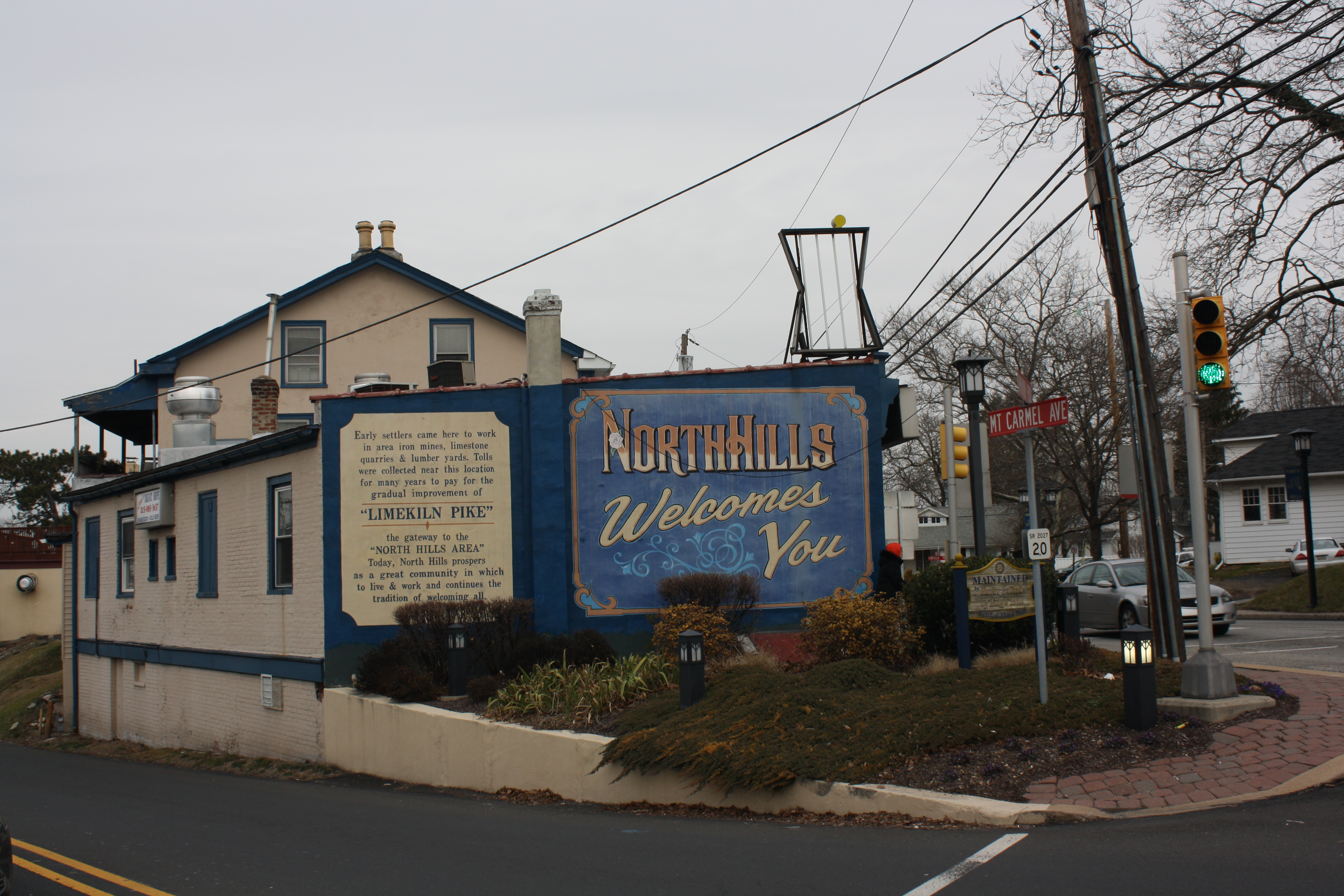
- Mt. Carmel Avenue in North Hills

- Location within Pennsylvania Location within the United States
- Coordinates: 40°06′45″N 75°10′11″W
- Country: United States
- State: Pennsylvania
- County: Montgomery
- Township: Abington, Springfield, and Upper Dublin
- Elevation: 243 ft (74 m)
- Time zone: UTC-5 (Eastern (EST))
  - Summer (DST): UTC-4 (EDT)
- ZIP code: 19038
- Area codes: 215, 267, and 445
- GNIS feature ID: 1212478

North Hills is an unincorporated community in Abington, Springfield, and Upper Dublin townships in Montgomery County, Pennsylvania, United States. It is served by the 19038 ZIP code., Glenside. It is served by the North Hills station on SEPTA Regional Rail's Lansdale/Doylestown Line.

It is bordered to the south-west by Mt. Carmel Avenue, to the north-west by Chelsea Avenue and North Hills Avenue, to the north-east by Jenkintown Road and to the south-east by rail road from Ardsley Train Station to the south.

== Notable people ==
- Ian Riccaboni, author, sports broadcaster for Phillies Nation TV and Ring of Honor wrestling

Omar Cruickshank, the owner of the first black owned Brazilian jiu-jitsu in Pennsylvania
