= Patricia Crowther =

Patricia Crowther may refer to:

- Patricia Crowther (caver) (born 1943), American cave explorer and cave surveyor
- Patricia Crowther (Wiccan) (1927–2025), British occultist

== See also ==
- Crowther (surname)
