= Ian Riccaboni =

American professional wrestling broadcaster and author

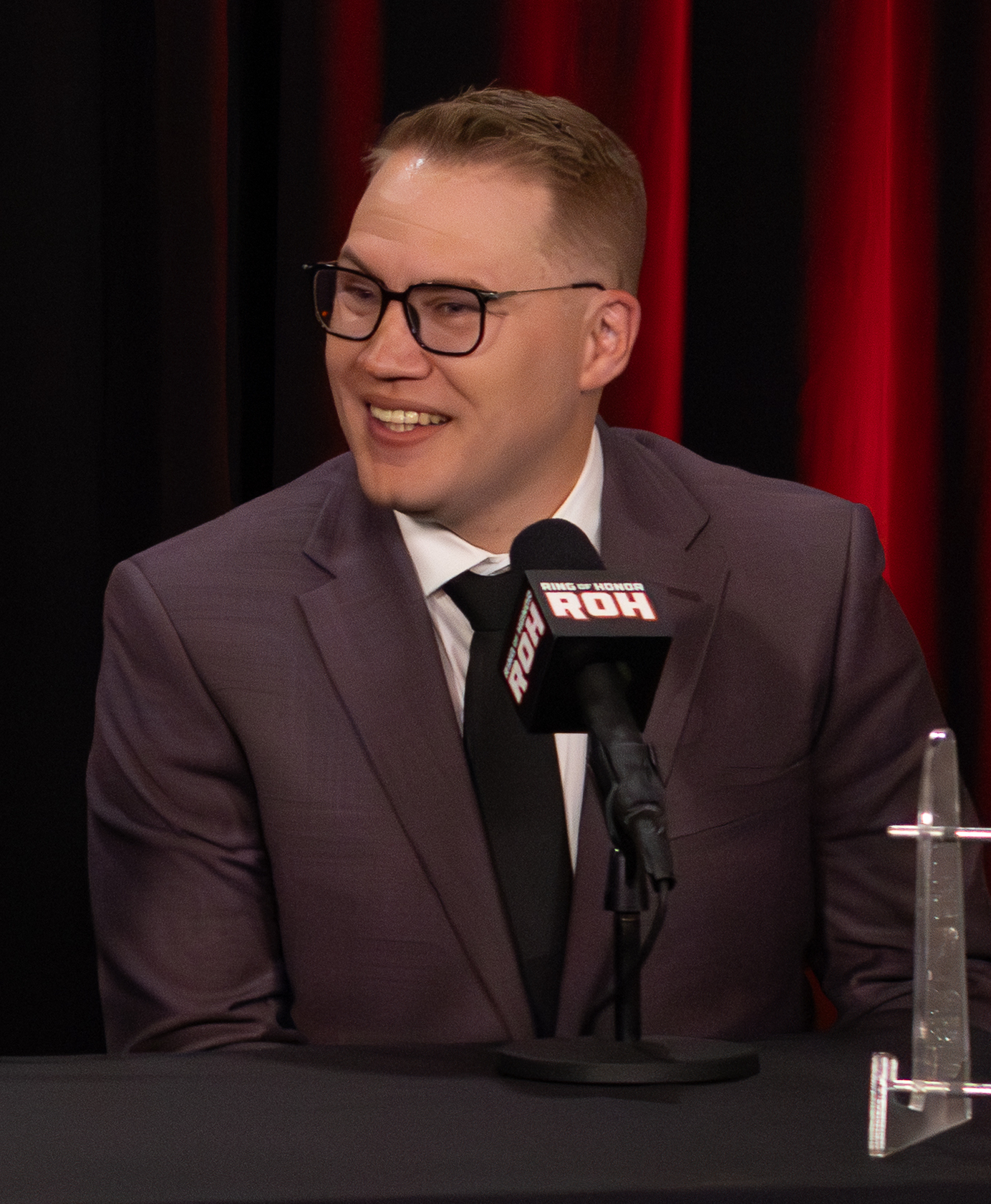
- Riccaboni at the 2026 Supercard of Honor post show media scrum

Personal information
- Born: January 13, 1987 (age 39) Allentown, Pennsylvania, U.S.
- Education: New York University (BS), University of Pennsylvania (MS, Ed.), Lehigh University (MBA)

Professional wrestling career
- Ring name: Ian Riccaboni
- Billed height: 6 ft 0 in (1.83 m)
- Debut: 2013

Ian Riccaboni (born January 13, 1987) is an American professional wrestling commentator, sports broadcaster, author, and politician. He is signed to New Japan Pro-Wrestling (NJPW) (English commentator), Ring of Honor (ROH) (as play-by-play commentator) and All Elite Wrestling (AEW) (as back-up commentator). Since 2023, he has also served as a school board member for the Salisbury Township School District in Pennsylvania.

== Early life and education ==
Riccaboni was born January 13, 1987, in Allentown, Pennsylvania. He graduated from Salisbury High School in Salisbury Township, Pennsylvania, in 2005. He graduated from New York University in May 2009 with a bachelor's degree in media and communications, in May 2010 with a master's degree in education management from the University of Pennsylvania and in February 2025 with a Master of Business Administration from Lehigh University.

== Career ==
Riccaboni first appeared on television when he was cast in a 1996 KidsPeace commercial featuring former Major League Baseball pitcher Jim Kaat. Riccaboni spent his early summers as a batboy for the Allentown Ambassadors of the independent Northern League. A fan of professional wrestling from a young age, Riccaboni's mother would take him to professional events put on by World Wrestling Federation (WWF), World Championship Wrestling (WCW), and Extreme Championship Wrestling (ECW) in his native Allentown.

During his first year at NYU, Riccaboni answered a casting call to be a part of a special to air on MTV called The Notorious BG, hosted by Gideon Yago with special guest Bill Gates. In early 2006, Riccaboni was cast for an MTVU commercial for their Best Music on Campus competition, competing on guitar, harmonica, and vocals. While at NYU, Riccaboni played baseball and was a Dean's Scholar, playing gigs around New York and NYU, including a gig opening for the cast of Spring Awakening at an NYU event in Gould Plaza. Riccaboni graduated NYU as the Class of 2009 president and received the President's Service Award. After graduating NYU in May 2009, Riccaboni pursued and completed a master's degree from Penn in education management. During his time at Penn, he returned to television, playing bass guitar as lead singer for the house band on "Hump Night with Kris Fried" on Service Electric TV 2.

Riccaboni has been married since October 6, 2012, to his wife Sarah, and they have two children. He resides in Salisbury Township, Pennsylvania in the Lehigh Valley region of eastern Pennsylvania.

=== Phillies Nation TV (2012–2015) ===
Riccaboni began writing as a full-time contributor to USA Today-award-winning blog Phillies Nation in November 2011. In 2012, Phillies Nation began producing Phillies Nation TV and Riccaboni began appearing on the show, interviewing minor leaguers and Philadelphia Phillies fans, including Marc Summers and Tony Luke. In 2014, Riccaboni conducted a four-part interview with Curt Simmons for the show and in 2015 interviewed Brad Lidge and Bobby Shantz. In association with Phillies Nation, Riccaboni released a book, "The 100 Greatest Phillies of All Time" on September 15, 2015.

=== Ring of Honor (2014–present) ===
Riccaboni began his professional wrestling announcing career after a chance meeting with The Blue Meanie, Brian Hefron. Riccaboni was to interview Hefron as part of his beat interviewing famous Philadelphia Phillies fans. The two were searching for a location, and Hefron suggested Monster Factory in Paulsboro, New Jersey. While filming the segment, Riccaboni met Monster Factory owner Danny Cage. Riccaboni phoned Cage about getting started in professional wrestling after the completion of the segment before beginning to work with the Monster Factory as an interviewer and commentator.

Through a camp with Ring of Honor (ROH) broadcaster Kevin Kelly and wrestler Bob Evans, Riccaboni discovered and asked to attend an ROH tryout camp. Riccaboni started as a personality with Ring of Honor at Future of Honor 2 in July 2014. Riccaboni called his first match with Ring of Honor on Saturday January 3, 2015, which featured Cheeseburger and Chris LeRusso.

In May 2015, Riccaboni made his debut as a ring announcer with Ring of Honor, announcing the first match at Global Wars '15's television taping. Riccaboni served as an in-arena host for Ring of Honor live events and a commentator for Future of Honor and Women of Honor matches before assuming the role of lead announcer starting with the February 25, 2017, episode.

Riccaboni called his first Pay Per View with ROH at ROH 15th Anniversary Show alongside Kelly and Colt Cabana. He and Cabana hold the distinction of being the first duo to ever call a Minoru Suzuki match on American soil when they did so at the Death Before Dishonor XV Pay Per View event.

In 2018, Riccaboni was commentator for the ALL IN broadcast with Don Callis, Sean Mooney, Excalibur, Alicia Atout, Justin Roberts, and Bobby Cruise Riccaboni served as the lead play-by-play announcer with Excalibur, Callis, and others joining throughout the night. On December 15, 2018, Riccaboni and Cabana were presented with the 2018 Broadcast Team of the Year Award by veteran wrestling writer, photographer, and editor Bill Apter.

On April 6, 2019, Riccaboni, Kelly, and Cabana called G1 Supercard, the first non-WWE wrestling event in Madison Square Garden since 1960.

In November 2019 at the Ring of Honor event "Unauthorized", Riccaboni wrestled the first match of his career, teaming with Camera Man Gator, Colt Cabana, Gary Juster (Ring of Honor's Director of Operation), and Todd Sinclair (a referee) to defeat Brian Johnson and Shane Taylor Promotions in a ten-man tag team match.

On December 23, 2019, RetroSoft Studios announced Riccaboni and Cabana would be providing commentary for the sequel to the 1991 arcade game WWF WrestleFest, RetroMania Wrestling, on PlayStation 4, Nintendo Switch, Xbox One, and PC.

Riccaboni represented Ring of Honor at Impact Wrestling's Hard To Kill (2022) calling the ROH World Championship bout between Jonathan Gresham and Chris Sabin. Riccaboni became the first commentator to appear on both a ROH Pay Per View and an Impact Pay Per View and did so within 28 days between Hard to Kill and Final Battle (2021).

=== New Japan Pro-Wrestling (2022–present) ===
On a Lehigh Valley with Love broadcast, Riccaboni announced he was still under contract with ROH but would begin on a tryout basis with New Japan Pro-Wrestling’s NJPW Strong on their January tapings in Seattle. It was reported in August 2022 that Riccaboni would be continuing with New Japan as the voice of Strong through at least the remainder of 2022.

=== All Elite Wrestling (2022–present) ===
Following Tony Khan's purchase of Ring of Honor, Riccaboni would appear to commentate during Ring of Honor matches on All Elite Wrestling, notably on April 29, 2022, during Samoa Joe's victory over Trent Beretta on Rampage.

Riccaboni became the target of Chris Jericho and the Jericho Appreciation Society following Jericho's ROH World Championship victory over Claudio Castagnoli at AEW Grand Slam (2022). Riccaboni would call all of Jericho's World Title defenses, including Jericho's defense at Full Gear (2022), making Riccaboni the first-ever to call Pay Per View bouts for ROH, Impact, GCW, NJPW, and AEW, doing so all in the same calendar year.

In July 2023, it was reported that Riccaboni signed a multi-year contract with AEW. Riccaboni has since served as a backup commentator for AEW.

== Community involvement ==
Riccaboni was a member of the Upper Dublin Historical Commission and was an adjunct professor at Holy Family University in Philadelphia. As a writer with Phillies Nation, Riccaboni worked to coordinate Wiffadelphia, Quizzo, and wrestling events events that raised food and money for Philabundance and Food Bank of South Jersey.

With ROH, Riccaboni has led the ROH Cares initiative to encourage ROH wrestlers, crew, and staff to improve the communities they are in, as well as the ones that host ROH events. In 2017, Riccaboni and Colt Cabana partnered with Rocky Romero, Bobby Cruise, and Cody Rhodes to raise $1550 across two nights to support victims of Hurricane Irma and Hurricane Maria. In 2019, Riccaboni and ROH ambassador Cary Silkin represented ROH at a WXW-C4 event co-promoted by WWE and coordinated by Lance Anoa'i to benefit Samu (wrestler). Following Final Battle (2019), Riccaboni and Caprice Coleman conducted a book drive for the United Way and WLVT-TV's Lehigh Valley Reads organization and the pair raised 526 books to donate.

Riccaboni has been involved in multiple efforts to raise money for LGBTQ causes. In 2019, ROH offered a redesigned Pride Edition of the t-shirt featuring his signature sign-off "Happy Wrestling" with the Pride Flag with proceeds going to the Bradbury-Sullivan LGBT community center in his hometown of Allentown. In 2020, Pro Wrestling Tees and ROH released a MicroBrawler in Riccaboni's likeness with the proceeds once again being donated to Bradbury-Sullivan. In 2021, Riccaboni and Bradbury-Sullivan partnered with Cameo on a campaign to once again raise money for the center in his hometown.

On July 31, 2023, Riccaboni was appointed as a member of the Salisbury Township School District School Board, filling a vacant seat created by a resignation. Riccaboni sought election for a full, four-year term in 2025 and advanced to the general election, cross-filing on the Democratic Party (United States) and Republican Party (United States) tickets. Riccaboni and three other incumbents won four year terms, running unopposed.

== Personal life ==
Riccaboni describes himself as "kind of bi."
