= KidsPeace =

American private charity serving the behavioral and mental health needs of children

Registered KidsPeace logo with dove in hand

KidsPeace is an American private charity that provides behavioral and mental health services for children, families, and communities. Founded in 1882, it operates a psychiatric hospital, residential treatment programs, educational services, foster care offices, and community-based treatment programs.

KidsPeace offers services in Georgia, Indiana, Maine, Maryland, New York, North Carolina, Pennsylvania, and Virginia.

KidsPeace was founded by William Thurston, president of the predecessor to Bethlehem Steel Corporation, in response to a smallpox epidemic that resulted in a number of orphaned and homeless children in southern Bethlehem, Pennsylvania. In 1895, Captain James Wiley donated a Salisbury Township (PA) home and 6 acres (24,000 m^{2}) of surrounding land to the charity. The organization was later renamed 'Wiley House,' a name it retained for many years before officially becoming 'KidsPeace' in January 1992.

== Treatment programs ==
KidsPeace provides a range of services to children in need of mental and behavioral health treatment, and to their families.

In 2015, KidsPeace School of Georgia received Bronze level recognition by U.S. News & World Report's listing of the best high schools in the nation.

According to the organization's annual report, in 2018 KidsPeace served nearly 10,000 clients through its various programs. Since 1882, it has treated more than 200,000 children and adults in need.

== Concerns over care of clients ==
In 1993, Dean Sine, a counselor in the Orefield, Pennsylvania, facility, restrained a 12-year-old boy by sitting on his buttocks and then lower back. The boy reported that he couldn't breathe, but the restraint was continued until after he was unresponsive, when it was discovered that he had stopped breathing. Resuscitation attempts failed, and the counselor was subsequently charged and acquitted of homicide in criminal court in 1995.

On February 21, 2002, a resident of Kidspeace's Orefield, PA campus took her own life. Chloe Cohen of Betsy Ross House hung herself while being placed on "suicide watch" to ensure her safety.

In 2007, admissions to KidsPeace were halted by state officials due to seven children sustaining broken bones while being restrained by KidsPeace staff. Admissions resumed in December 2007 after KidsPeace implemented new policies on use of restraints and restricting admission of violent and aggressive clients into the program.

In April 2008, two 16-year-old girls accessed a counselor's supply of methadone pills in her car. The girls took a total of 28 pills, resulting in one fatally overdosing and another being partially paralyzed. They were being given a ride home from a group home for children with drug problems.

== Financial issues, pension default, and bankruptcy ==
As of 2010, the pension plan for KidsPeace was underfunded by $42 million. In January 2012, it failed to make a $1.4 million bond payment. In March 2012, a lien was filed against KidsPeace for failing to contribute $3 million to its retirement plan. As a partial result, Moody's downgraded KidsPeace's bond rating to a C.

In May 2013, KidsPeace filed for Chapter 11 bankruptcy. The filing listed organizational debts totaling nearly $249 million, including nearly $100 million in unfunded pension obligations. Also in May 2013, the Pension Benefit Guarantee Corporation assumed control of the KidsPeace pension plan after KidsPeace officials defaulted on making required payments.

KidsPeace emerged from bankruptcy protection in July 2014.
