= Salisbury High School (Pennsylvania) =

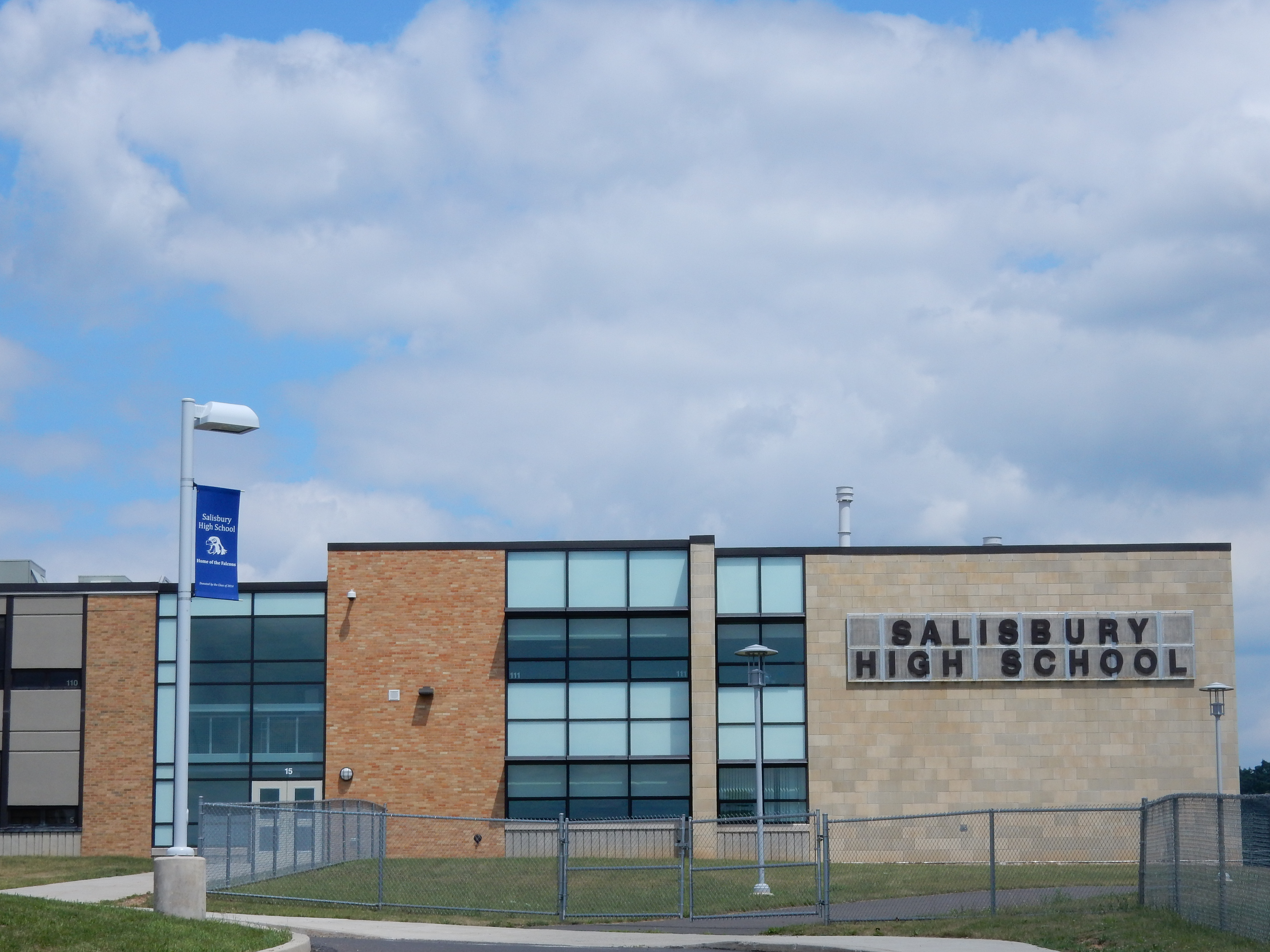
- Salisbury High School in June 2015

Location
- 500 East Montgomery Street; Allentown, Pennsylvania 18103-5225; United States; 40°35′3″N 75°26′32″W

Information
- Type: Public high school
- Established: 1963; 63 years ago
- School district: Salisbury Township School District
- NCES School ID: 422073002833
- Principal: Heather Morningstar
- Staff: 31.49 (on an FTE basis)
- Grades: 9th–12th
- Enrollment: 546 (2024–25)
- Student to teacher ratio: 17.34
- Campus type: Suburb: Large
- Colors: Navy and White
- Athletics conference: Colonial League
- Website: www.salisburysd.org/o/shs

Salisbury High School is a public high school located in Salisbury Township, Pennsylvania, in the Lehigh Valley region of eastern Pennsylvania, United States. It is the only high school within the Salisbury Township School District.

As of the 2024–25 school year, the school had an enrollment of 546 students, according to National Center for Education Statistics data.

== History ==
Salisbury Township was founded in 1834. In 1955, the construction for Salisbury High School was planned. Construction started in 1962 and was finished in 1963.

Until 2011, Salisbury High School served grades 10 through 12, with ninth grade attending Salisbury Middle School. The high school underwent major renovations between 2009 and 2011, which included making space to move the district's ninth grade students into the high school.

== Athletics ==
=== Districts ===
Salisbury participates in the Colonial League of the Pennsylvania Interscholastic Athletic Association's District XI.

- Baseball (1980, 1985–1987, 1996, 2004, 2011, 2013)
- Boys' Basketball (1971, 1976, 1987, 1990, 1996, 2011)
- Boys' Soccer (1985–1987, 1992, 2003, 2010, 2016)
- Boys' Swimming (2012, 2013, 2014)
- Field Hockey (2025)
- Rifle Team (2006)

=== Colonial League titles ===
Salisbury was in the now-defunct Lehigh-Northampton League starting in 1968 until the creation of the Colonial League in 1975. The Lehigh-Northampton League originally included Bangor, East Stroudsburg, Nazareth, Parkland, Pen Argyl, Saucon Valley, and Wilson before admitting Northwestern, Pleasant Valley, Pocono Mountain and Salisbury in 1968, Southern Lehigh in 1969, and Jim Thorpe and Palisades in 1971.

Prior to Salisbury joining the Colonial League, Salisbury was successful in various sports. Coach Bill Paulik led Salisbury Boys' Basketball to eight league championships, including a memorable 1974 Lehigh-Northampton Championship victory over Parkland where, throughout the season, Salisbury primarily played just five players dubbed "The Iron Five". Additionally, Salisbury captured the Lehigh-Northampton League football championship in 1971, defeating Southern Lehigh in the last game of the season 22-9 to clinch their only Lehigh-Northampton League Football Championship.

The Colonial League initially included Lehigh Valley high schools deemed too small to participate in the East Penn Conference following a reassessment of the Eastern Big Eight, Lehigh Valley Scholastic League, and the Lehigh-Northampton League sports conferences.

- Baseball (1978, 1980, 1983, 1986, 1987, 1991, 1992, 1993, 1994, 1995, 2009, 2012, 2013)
- Boys' Basketball (1978, 1979, 1984, 1989, 1990, 1991, 1993, 1995, 2002, 2004, 2012)
- Boys' Cross Country (1975)
- Boys' Soccer (1978, 1979, 1981, 1986, 2003)
- Field Hockey (2026)
- Girls' Basketball (1989, 1990, 1991, 1994)
- Girls' Soccer (1996)

=== Eastern Pennsylvania Conference championship ===
- Football (2006)

=== State championship titles ===
- Swimming (2013)

The school fields teams in most major sports, including boys baseball, boys' and girls' basketball, boys tennis, cheerleading, girls' field hockey, girls' softball, football, soccer, rifle, wrestling, and track and field.

=== Teams ===
Salisbury has the Colonial League titles in basketball and baseball. Salisbury offers 22 varsity and 13 junior varsity sport programs.

Boys Varsity

- Baseball - AA
- Basketball- AAA
- Cross Country - AA
- Football - AA
- Golf - AA
- Rifle - AAAA
- Soccer - AA
- Swimming and Diving - AA
- Tennis - AA
- Track and field - AA
- Wrestling - AA

Girls Varsity

- Basketball - AA
- Cheer - AAAA
- Cross Country - AA
- Field hockey - AA
- Golf - AA
- Rifle - AAAA
- Soccer (Fall) - AA
- Softball - AA
- Swimming and Diving - AA
- Girls' Tennis - AA
- Track and Field - AA
- Volleyball - AA

== Notable alumni ==
- Michael Crowther, wildlife conservationist and former president and chief executive officer, Indianapolis Zoo
- Dan Etzweiler, former professional baseball player, Toronto Blue Jays system
- Jude LaCava, retired KSAZ-TV anchor, Arizona Media Association Hall of Famer, Rocky Mountain Emmy Award winner
- Ian Riccaboni, host of All Elite Wrestling's Ring of Honor
- Jason Yeisley, former professional soccer player, FC Dallas, Pittsburgh Riverhounds SC, Reading United AC, and Richmond Kickers
