= Michael Crowther =

American zoological conservationist

Michael I. Crowther (born 1952) is a retired American zoological conservationist who is now Director Emeritus of the Indianapolis Zoological Society. He was appointed president and chief executive officer of the Indianapolis Zoo in 2002 and retired in January, 2020. He was previously president and chief executive officer of the New Jersey State Aquarium. Crowther is known as creator of the Indianapolis Prize, an award for animal conservation. The Indianapolis Prize is widely regarded as the world's leading award in the field of animal conservation. The Michael I. Crowther Conservation Forum is a part of the biennial Indianapolis Prize programming and features a moderated discussion with both the most recent Indianapolis Prize winner and the winner of the Indianapolis Prize Emerging Conservationist Award.https://www.indianapoliszoo.com/prize/events/

In 2017, Crowther began working with officials of the International Union for the Conservation of Nature (IUCN) Species Survival Commission (SSC) to develop a new resource for adding efficiency and accountability to the SSC's Assess-Plan-Act model of conservation. Crowther's plan for a Global Center for Species Survival, bringing key full-time specialist group coordinators together to manage the SSC's projects, was signed into agreement at the SSC's Annual Leaders Meeting in Abu Dhabi on October 7, 2019, and the Center opened on the Indianapolis Zoo campus in 2021 with startup funding from the Lilly Endowment, Inc.

== Early life and education ==
Crowther was born in 1952 at Bedford, England. He was educated at Bedford Modern School, and graduated from Salisbury High School in Salisbury Township, Pennsylvania and Kutztown University. Crowther emigrated to Pennsylvania with his family as a teenager.

== Career ==
He was appointed president and chief executive officer of the Indianapolis Zoo in 2002. He was previously president and chief executive officer of the New Jersey State Aquarium. Crowther has served on the boards of the International Species Information System, the Dian Fossey Gorilla Fund International, and The National Elephant Center.

In 2014, Crowther was named a Distinguished Hoosier by Governor Mitch Daniels and received Indiana's Excellence in Innovation award. Crowther was named a member of the Order of the Sagamores of the Wabash, the State of Indiana's highest award, by Governor Eric Holcomb, in September, 2017.

On February 15, 2019, Crowther was named International Citizen of the Year by The International Center. Indianapolis Mayor Joe Hogsett proclaimed December 6, 2019 - the day after Crowther's retirement party - as Michael Crowther Day in Indianapolis. Additionally, the Indianapolis Zoological Society named the biennial Indianapolis Prize leadership lecture in Crowther's honor, established the Michael I. Crowther Indianapolis Prize Endowment, and arranged for a bull elephant in Tarangire National Park in Tanzania to be named "Mike."
