= Gauff Hill, Pennsylvania =

Unincorporated community in Pennsylvania, U.S.

Coordinates: 40°35′29″N 75°24′55″W

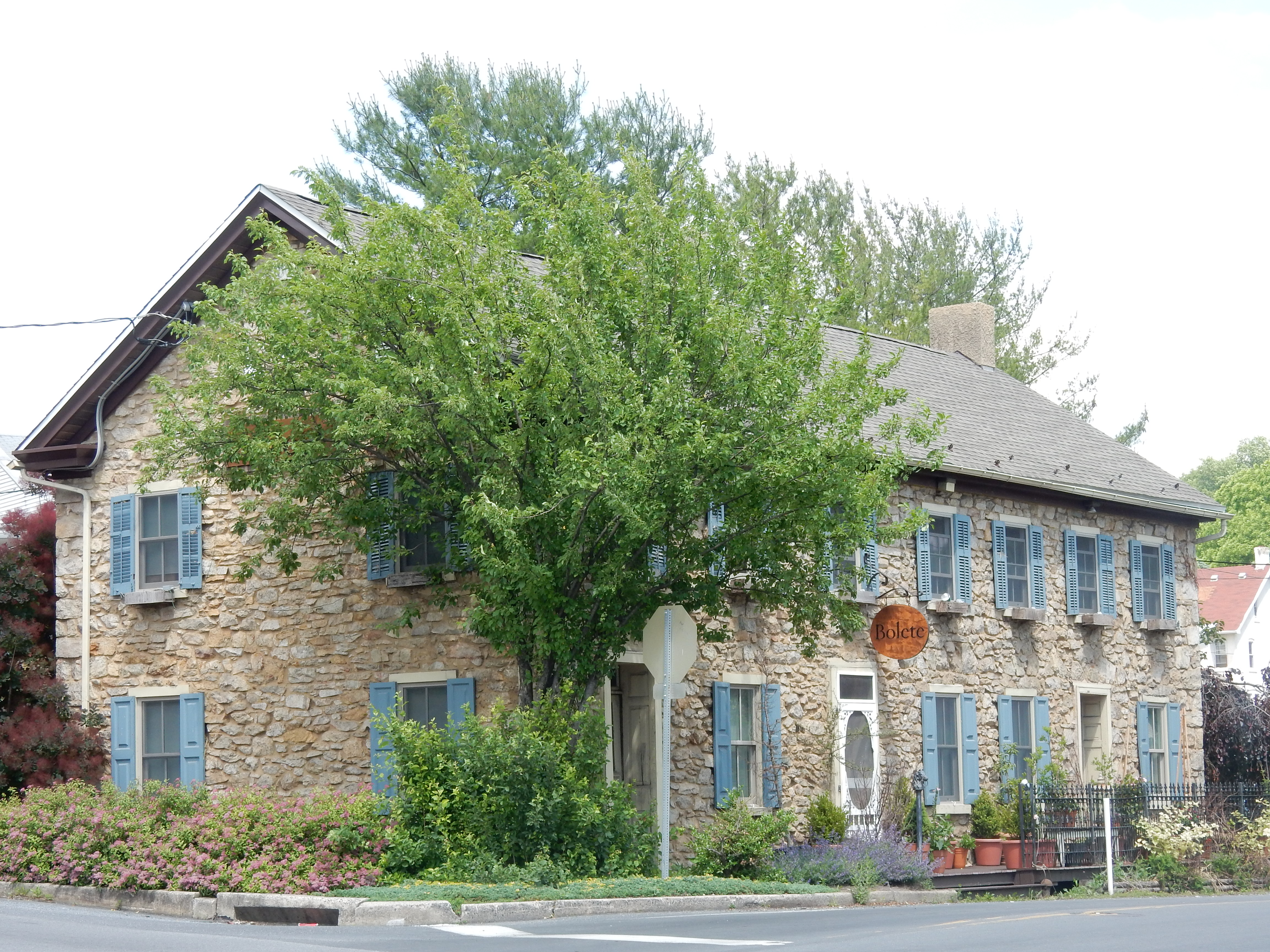
Bolete Restaurant and Inn in Gauff Hill in June 2015

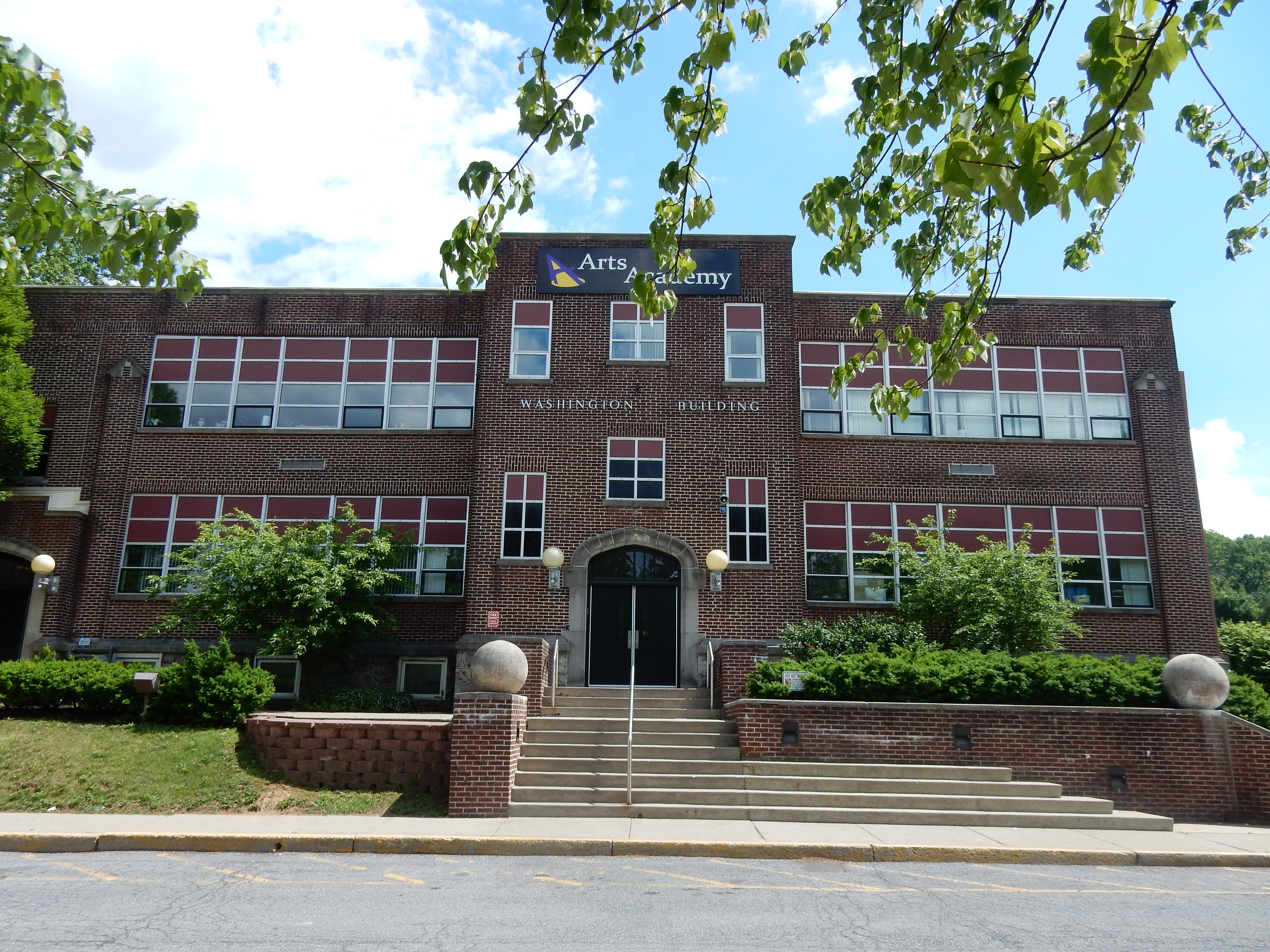
Arts Academy's Washington Building

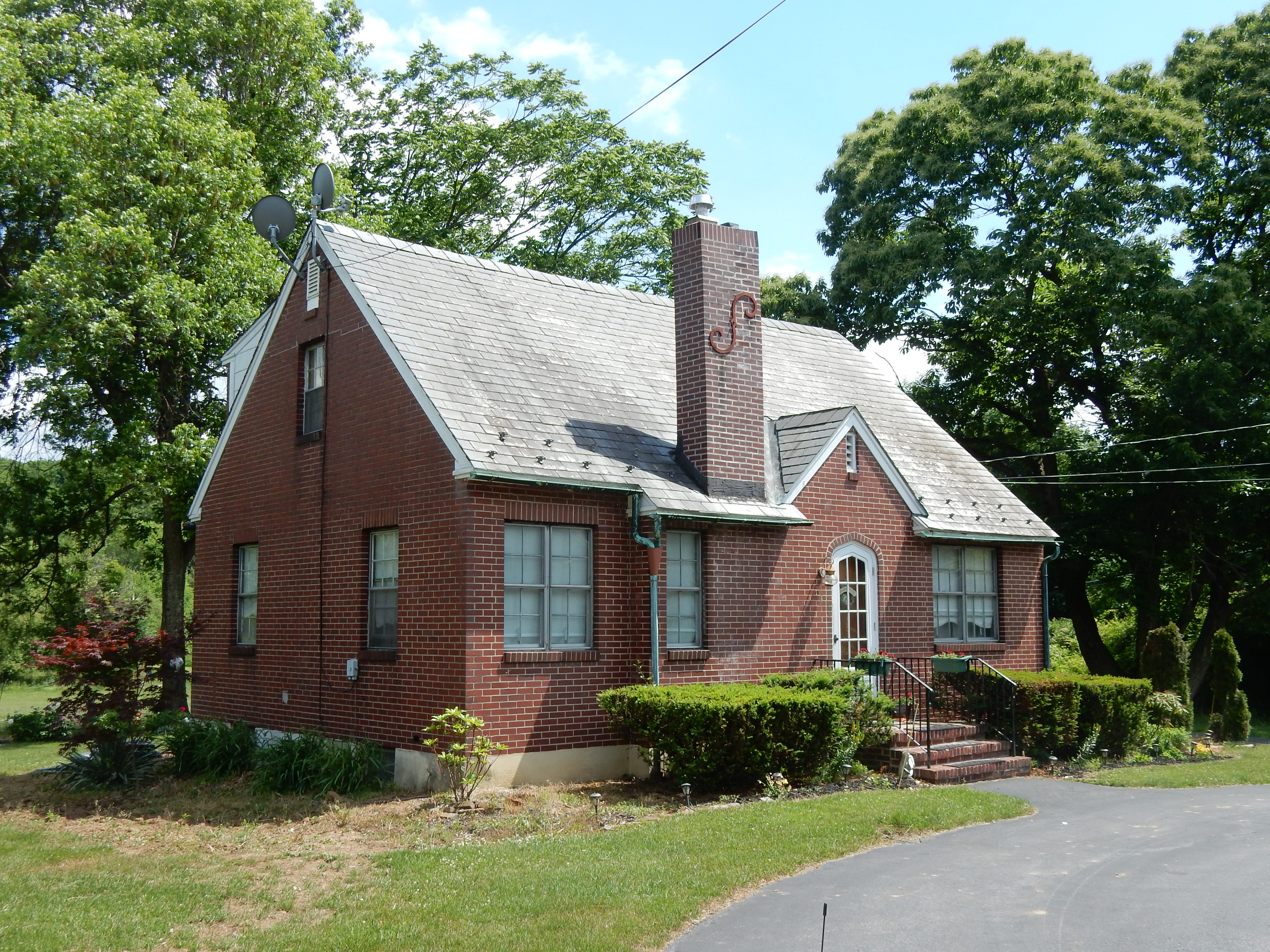
East Emaus Avenue

Gauff Hill is an unincorporated community in the extreme eastern Salisbury Township in Lehigh County, Pennsylvania. It is part of the Lehigh Valley, which has a population of 861,899 and was the 68th-most populous metropolitan area in the U.S. as of the 2020 census.

Gauff Hill is located at the head of a valley between arms of South Mountain to the north and south and is separated from the Lehigh River by the former. The East Branch Trout Creek starts just east of the village and flows west to join the South Branch in Allentown to become the Trout Creek, a tributary of the Lehigh River.

Gauff Hill is located at the junction of the two roads connecting the south sides of Allentown and Bethlehem, Emaus Avenue and Susquehanna Street. These two roads form a triangle intersection with Seidersville Road and join to become Broadway, which continues via Fountain Hill to Bethlehem.

The lines dividing the addresses and telephone exchanges between Allentown and Bethlehem both split the village, which uses area code 610. The Allentown and Bethlehem zip codes serving Gauff Hill are 18103 and 18015, respectively.
