= Phillies Nation TV =

- Genre: Sports
- Created by: Brian Michael, Pat Gallen, Corey Seidman
- Written by: Pat Gallen, Corey Seidman, Ian Riccaboni, Jay Floyd
- Theme music composer: Bryan McGee
- Country of origin: United States
- No. of seasons: 4 Service Electric; 3 Comcast Network
- No. of episodes: 102

Production
- Executive producer: Brian Michael
- Producers: Brian Michael, Pat Gallen, Corey Seidman
- Production locations: Yards Brewing Company (2011-2012), McFadden's at the Ball Park (2012-2013), Growler's Bar (2013), Shibe Vintage Sports (2014), McStew's (2014), Field House (2014-2015)
- Running time: 30 minutes

Original release
- Network: Service Electric, Comcast Network
- Release: April 3, 2012

Phillies Nation TV is an American television sports show focusing on the Philadelphia Phillies. The weekly broadcast features two hosts, Pat Gallen and Corey Seidman, discussing current Phillies topics. The two are joined by co-hosts Natalie Egenolf and Ryann Williams, who present reader questions. Correspondents Ian Riccaboni and Jay Floyd interview current and former Phillies players and prospects, highlight charity events run associated with the Phillies, and interview notable Phillies fans, such as former wrestler The Blue Meanie and cheese steak mogul Tony Luke.

The show began its original run on Service Electric in 2012. For the 2013 season, Phillies Nation TV began airing first run episodes on Comcast Network and re-runs on Comcast SportsNet in addition to airing on Service Electric. The 2013 season featured an emphasis on features and interviews as the show featured baseball-related interviews with Marc Summers, Artie Lange, and Brian Dawkins.

For the show's third season, former Phillies' pitcher Tommy Greene provided pitching tips while former Phillies outfielder Matt Stairs provided hitting tips throughout each episode. The 2014 season also featured a four-part interview with former Phillies' pitcher Curt Simmons.

Phillies Nation TV also produces exclusive web content for CSNPhilly.com.
