= Robert Crowther (author) =

Author and paper engineer

Robert Crowther (born 1948) is an author, illustrator, and paper engineer who has written children's books with pop-ups and moveable parts. He has also worked as a teacher. He lives in Norfolk, England.

== Early life ==
He was born in Leeds, England. He graduated from Norwich School of Art where he studied art and design in 1970 and from Royal College of Art with an M.A. in 1973. He is a member of the Federation of Children's Book Groups and British Society of Authors.

In 2013 Crowther spoke to a group of students at Easthampstead Park Community School.

== Books ==
- The Most Amazing Hide-and-Seek Alphabet Book, Viking Kestrel, London, England (1978)
- The Most Amazing Hide-and-Seek Counting Book, Viking Kestrel, London, England (1981)
- Deep Down Under Ground
- Trains; A Pop-up Railway Book
- Robert Crowther's Pop-up Dinosaur ABCs (2014)
- Ships
- Trains
- Flight
- Opposites
- My Pop-up Surprise ABC
- Pop Goes the Weasel; 25 Pop-Up Nursery Rhymes
- Robert Crowther's Amazing Pop-Up Big Machines
- Robert Crowther's Pop-Up Olympics
- Colors
- Let's Cook!
- Animal Rap!
- Robert Crowther's Incredible Animal Alphabet
- All the Fun of the Fair
- The Most Amazing Night Book
- Shapes
- Cars, A Pop-Up Book of Automobiles
- Robert Crowther's Amazing Pop-Up House of Inventions (2009)
- Soccer
- Pop-Up Cornwall
- Amazing Pop-Up Trucks
- House of Inventions
