= Salisbury Township School District =

School district in Pennsylvania, United States

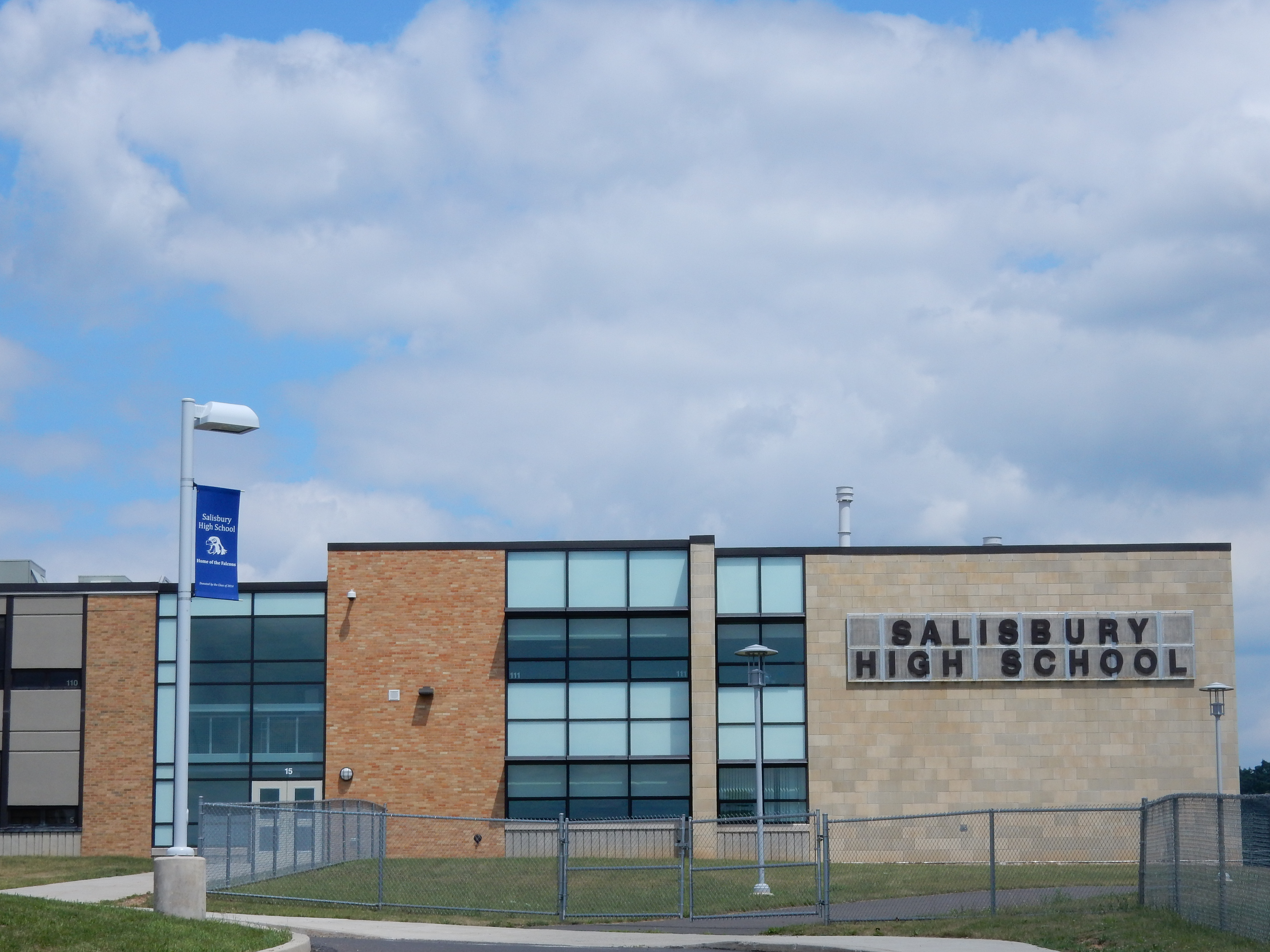
- Salisbury High School in June 2015

Address
- 1140 Salisbury Road Allentown, Lehigh County, Pennsylvania, Pennsylvania, 18103; United States
- Coordinates: 40.58951°N 75.42938°W

District information
- Type: Public
- Grades: K-12
- Schools: Four, including Salisbury High School
- Budget: $46.16 million
- NCES District ID: 4220730

Students and staff
- Students: 1,457 (2024-25)
- Teachers: 107.49 (on an FTE basis)
- Student–teacher ratio: 13.55
- Athletic conference: Colonial League
- Colors: Navy and White

Other information
- Website: www.salisburysd.org

Salisbury Township School District is a small, suburban, public school district located in Lehigh County, Pennsylvania in the Lehigh Valley region of eastern Pennsylvania. It serves Salisbury Township. The district encompasses approximately 11 square miles (28 km^{2}).

As of the 2024–25 school year, the school district had a total enrollment of 1,457 students between all its four schools, according to National Center for Education Statistics data, which include Salisbury High School for grades nine through 12, Salisbury Middle School for grades five through eight, Arts Academy Charter School for grades five through eight, and Salisbury Elementary School for kindergarten through fourth grade.

According to 2000 census data, the school district serves a resident population of 13,498. By 2010, The U.S. Census Bureau reported that Salisbury Township School District's resident population was 13,505 people. In 2009, the district residents’ per capita income was $28,073, while the median family income was $62,534. In the Commonwealth, the median family income was $49,501 and the United States median family income was $49,445, in 2010. By 2013, the median household income in the United States rose to $52,100. The educational attainment levels for the Salisbury Township School District population (25 years old and over) were 91.0% high school graduates and 28.9% college graduates.

Salisbury High School students may choose to attend Lehigh Career and Technical Institute for training in the trades. The Carbon Lehigh Intermediate Unit, IU21, provides the district with a wide variety of services like specialized education for disabled students and hearing, speech and visual disability services and professional development for staff and faculty.

== Schools ==
- Salisbury High School
- Salisbury Middle School
- Salisbury Elementary School
- Arts Academy Charter School (grades 5-8)

== Extracurriculars ==
=== High school sports ===
The school district's sports include:

Varsity

Boys

- Baseball - AA
- Basketball- AAA
- Cross Country - AA
- Football - AA
- Golf - AA
- Rifle - AAAA
- Soccer - AA
- Swimming and diving - AA
- Tennis - AA
- Track and field - AA
- Wrestling - AA

Girls

- Basketball - AA
- Cheer - AAAA
- Cross Country - AA
- Field hockey - AA
- Golf - AA
- Rifle - AAAA
- Soccer (Fall) - AA
- Softball - AA
- Swimming and diving - AA
- Girls' tennis - AA
- Track and field - AA

Middle School sports

Boys

- Baseball
- Basketball
- Cross Country
- Football
- Soccer
- Swimming and Diving
- Track and Field
- Wrestling

Girls

- Basketball
- Cross Country
- Field Hockey
- Indoor Track and Field
- Soccer (Fall)
- Softball
- Swimming and Diving
- Track and Field

According to PIAA directory July 2013
