= Thomas Crowther (priest) =

English evangelical clergyman in the Church of England (1794–1859)

- Born: 1794; Thornton in Craven, Yorkshire, England
- Died: 1859 (aged 64–65); Cragg Vale, Yorkshire, England
- Citizenship: British subject
- Occupation: Clerk in Holy Orders (Anglican Minister)
- Spouse: Phoebe Wilkinson
- Writing career
- Period: Nineteenth century

Thomas Crowther (1794 – 1859) was an evangelical clergyman in the Church of England who served as perpetual curate of St John in the Wilderness at Cragg Vale from 1822 until 1859. He was a friend of the Brontë family and an outspoken critic of the working conditions for children employed in cotton factories.

== Biography ==
=== Early life and appointments ===
He was the son of a weaver, James Crowther of Earby on the Lancashire-Yorkshire border, and was baptised at nearby Thornton-in-Craven on 14 September 1794. Following study at Trinity College, Dublin, he was ordained a deacon on 29 July 1821 and became curate of Overton on the same day. He was ordained a priest on 14 July 1822 and immediately afterwards appointed to the perpetual curacy of St John in the Wilderness, an episcopal chapel in the parish of Halifax, with an annual stipend of £50.

The church of which he became minister stood at Marshaw Bridge in an area of scattered hamlets that, over time, coalesced into the village of Cragg Vale. Built in 1817, the structure was of such poor quality that by 1837 its roof, having already once fallen in, was supported by props. Building of a replacement nearby was commissioned under the Church Building Acts and, during his inspection of the work, Crowther was descending the tower when masons in the belfry accidentally dislodged a loose stone. Crowther narrowly escaped serious injury, the stone touching his hat as it fell. The completed church, which seated 800 (three times the previous capacity), was consecrated by Bishop Longley on 2 October 1839 and Crowther remained its incumbent until his death. In 1857 he suffered a stroke from which he never fully recovered, and for a time he was virtually carried into church to conduct services.

=== Activism relating to reform of child labour ===
Cragg Vale (sometimes called Cragg Dale or Cragg Valley) contained seven cotton mills employing large numbers of adults and children who laboured for long hours in cruel conditions for pitifully small reward. "I have seen the poor in this valley oppressed," declared Crowther, "I have thought it my duty to expose it... to bring it into contrast with the liberal and kindly truth of the Gospel." His presentation of such contrast, in sermons delivered from the pulpit of his geographically isolated church, attracted little more attention than the hostility of local mill-owners, who "cursed and insulted him and his daughters in the streets", until in 1832 he was visited by George Crabtree.

Crabtree, who was touring the district to gauge support for the Ten Hours Bill, reported his meeting with Crowther (whom he disguised as "Rev. Devine") to Richard Oastler, "King of the Factory Children", in a letter published in 1833. This quoted "Devine" as saying that if any place in England needed legislative interference it was Cragg Vale, where factory children were frequently forced to work fifteen or sixteen hours a day and sometimes all night in "a murderous system" that made their employers "the pest and disgrace of society". He spoke of burying two brothers, aged eleven and nine, whose constitutions had been broken by the conditions of factory work, and gave examples of local mill-owners’ indifference to cases of suffering among their workforce.

At a public meeting in the Old Assembly Rooms in Halifax on 8 April 1833, Oastler repeated the allegations made by "Devine", who was readily deduced to be Crowther, and in July 1833 handbills were widely distributed by way of "An Appeal to the Public by the ‘Factory Masters’ in Cragg Valley against the Misrepresentations and Lies of the Rev. T. Crowther, R. Oastler, and G. Crabtree". The appeal called for a meeting at which these three, together with any witnesses supporting their allegations, could be publicly examined.

Such meeting never took place, the ‘masters’ declining to promise witnesses would not be punished on account of their evidence, but on 24 August some 5,000 local people assembled at Hebden Bridge to hear Oastler "expose the atrocities committed by certain Factory Masters in the neighbourhood", call upon them to come forward to defend themselves, and praise Thomas Crowther for his courage. "You may go, ye tyrants, and insult the ambassador of God who dares to tell you of your faults," said Oastler, "you may tell him of his poverty and your wealth which is gotten by robbery and murder. I know that you have told your clergyman that you will work on a Sunday in spite of him... Remember the day will come when you will be glad to receive the instruction and advice of that same minister". Among those who also spoke at the August meeting was Rev. G. S. Bull of Bierley, a fearless advocate of factory reform, from whose pulpit Crowther preached in the following December.

Crowther, who said he spoke out on account of "the responsible nature of my office", seems to have confined to the pulpit his public calls for reform, perhaps under advice from Archdeacon Musgrave, the Vicar of Halifax, in whose parish and in whose gift his living lay. However, Oastler and his lieutenants continued to draw attention to the practices Crowther had exposed, and the name of Cragg Vale acquired an almost totemic significance for some of those calling for greater protection of factory children.

=== Preaching ===
Crowther was an effective and popular preacher. Visits by him were much in demand by churches in the Pennine valleys, his sermons swelling both congregations and collections in aid of building Sunday Schools, educating the poor, or repairing church fabric. On such visits he would preach two or sometimes three sermons in the course of a Sunday. The appeal of his "impressive" and "faithful and appreciated" preaching may perhaps be gauged from what followed his visit to the church of St Michael on the Hill at Lumb, near Bacup, in April 1852; his sermon there raised a relatively modest collection (£6.15s.8d) but when he returned to the district to preach at St John’s, Bacup, three months later, the church was so crowded that many of those wishing to hear him had to be turned away and the collection yielded nearly £70.

=== The Brontë connection ===
Crowther is said to have been a longtime friend of Patrick Brontë and of his curate and eventual son-in-law Arthur Bell Nicholls. Haworth was among the parishes to which he made regular, perhaps annual, preaching visits during the period 1830–54 and on occasion he more generally assisted by baptising children there. In 1846 he stayed overnight after delivering the Sunday School sermons in order to attend an oratorio in the church on the following day, when he and Brontë sat prominently in the west gallery to demonstrate that, unlike other Church of England clergy who boycotted the event, they were happy to entertain an accomplished soloist who happened to be a Baptist.

Five of Crowther’s daughters were pupils at the Clergy Daughters’ School, though not during the time the Brontë sisters were there. In 1857 one of these daughters, Sarah Baldwin, engaged in an ill-tempered exchange of correspondence with Arthur Bell Nicholls after he confirmed that (as asserted in Elizabeth Gaskell’s biography of Charlotte Brontë) the conditions at the Cowan Bridge school were accurately portrayed in Jane Eyre. In this correspondence, published in the Bradford Observer, Mrs Baldwin particularly objected to Nicholls’ claim that Thomas Crowther had spoken disparagingly of the school, expressing surprise that "you could condescend to partake of my Father’s hospitality, as you have done, then make such mean remarks about him".

Crowther is thought to have been the clergyman whom Charlotte, in a letter to her publisher, said she had witnessed reading Jane Eyre and marvelling at the resemblance of Lowood and its characters to the school and staff at Cowan Bridge, without knowing he was in the presence of the book’s author, "Currer Bell".

=== Family and death ===
Crowther married Phoebe Wilkinson at Thornton-in-Craven on 16 February 1815. Of their six sons, two became surgeon-physicians and three entered holy orders. The second son, William Crowther, married Susannah Bendyshe, a great-niece of Admiral Lord Nelson. Of Thomas Crowther’s several daughters, Mary married Jonathan Knowles, a prosperous brewer who was the principal force behind the building of St Paul’s church at Denholme Gate, where Crowther afterwards frequently preached. In 1845 her sister, Sarah, married their father’s curate, Rev. William Baldwin, who was appointed to the Denholme living but surrendered it in order to become perpetual curate of Mytholmroyd.

Crowther died in November 1859. His widow died on 13 March 1875, aged 80. They were buried in St John’s churchyard.

A tablet erected to his memory in the church is inscribed:

“A Sacred Tribute of Affection and Gratitude to the Rev. Thomas Crowther, who faithfully ministered for 38 years in this parish and who died on the 18th November 1859, aged 65. From a People who honour his memory and desire to hand down his name to the veneration of their children. Tender and affectionate in his family; Loyal as a citizen, Devoted at a Christian; Faithful as a Pastor. This man of God has left many to deplore his loss. His good works were many; His labour was not in vain in the Lord. Humility the brightest gem in his own character. His earthly remains repose beside this Sacred Edifice which he was chiefly instrumental in erecting.”
