= Salisbury Township, Lehigh County, Pennsylvania =

Township in Pennsylvania, US

Salisbury Township
- Township
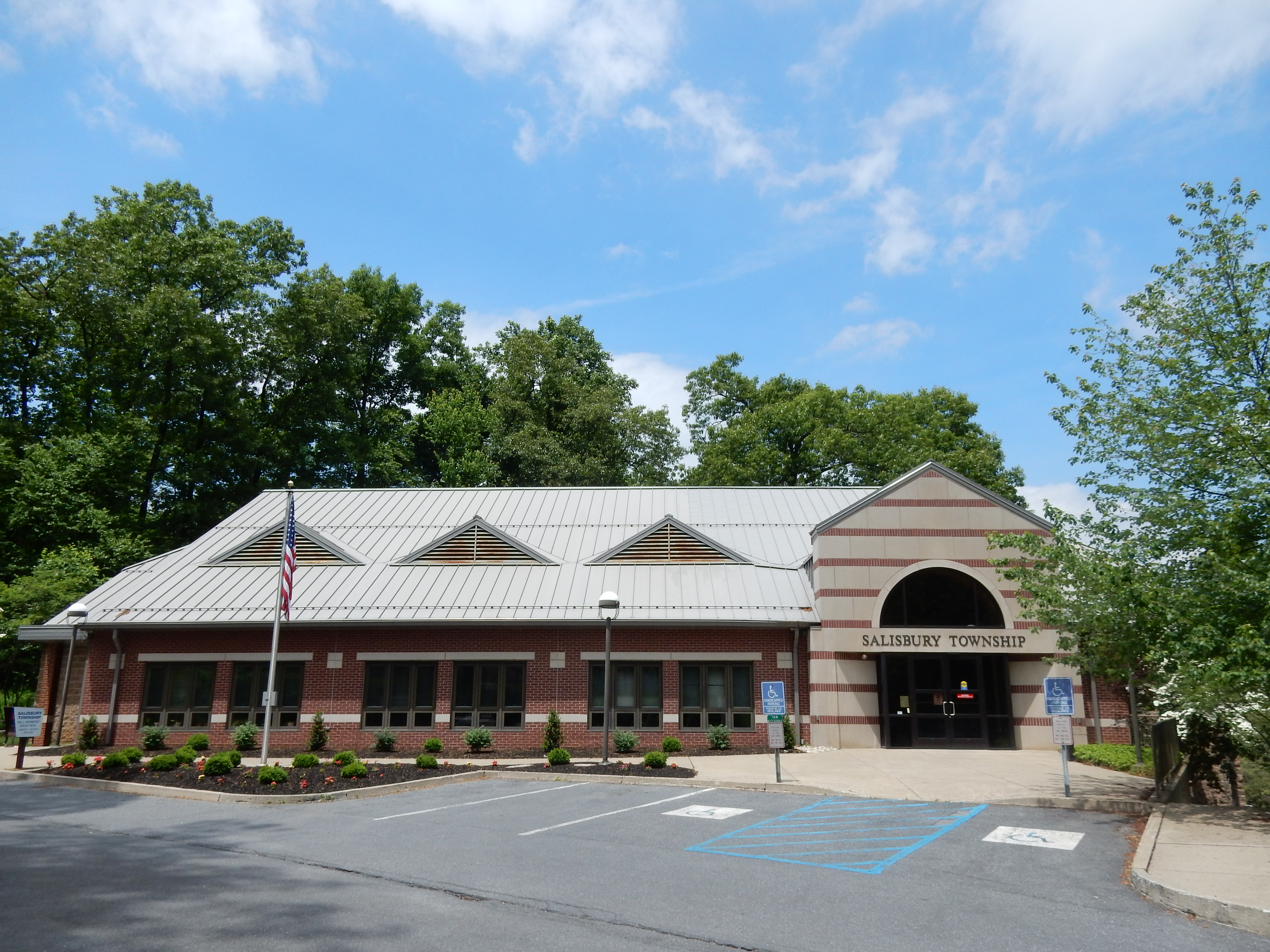
- Salisbury Township Office in June 2015

- Seal

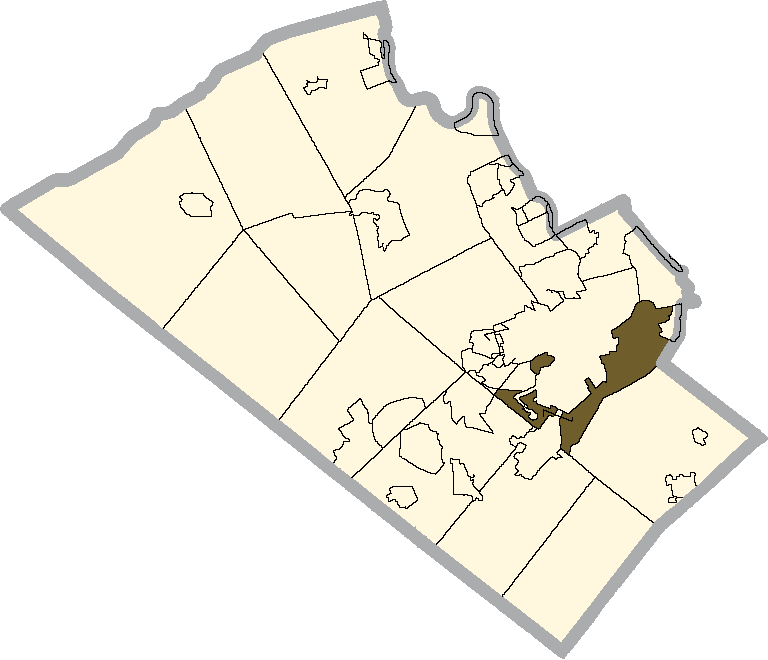
- Location of Salisbury Township in Lehigh County, Pennsylvania

- Location of Salisbury Township in Pennsylvania Location in the United States
- Coordinates: 40°34′46″N 75°30′09″W
- Country: United States
- State: Pennsylvania
- County: Lehigh

Area
  - Township: 11.27 sq mi (29.19 km^{2})
  - Land: 11.17 sq mi (28.93 km^{2})
  - Water: 0.10 sq mi (0.26 km^{2})
- Elevation: 354 ft (108 m)

Population (2020)
  - Township: 13,621
  - Estimate (2022): 13,585
  - Density: 1,232.0/sq mi (475.67/km^{2})
  - Metro: 865,310 (US: 68th)
- Time zone: UTC-5 (EST)
  - Summer (DST): UTC-4 (EDT)
- ZIP Codes: 18015, 18049, and 18103
- Area codes: 610 and 484
- FIPS code: 42-077-67576
- Primary airport: Lehigh Valley International Airport
- Major hospital: Lehigh Valley Hospital–Cedar Crest
- School district: Salisbury Township
- Website: salisburylehighpa.gov

Salisbury Township is a township in Lehigh County, Pennsylvania, United States. The township's population was 13,621 at the 2020 census. The township borders Allentown, Pennsylvania's third-largest city, Bethlehem, and Emmaus, in the Lehigh Valley, which had a population of 861,899 and was the 68th-most populous metropolitan area in the U.S. as of the 2020 census.

Salisbury Township is located 3.8 miles (6.1 km) southeast of Allentown, 56.6 miles (91.1 km) north of Philadelphia, and 87.6 miles (141.0 km) west of New York City. South Mall, an enclosed shopping mall, is located on Lehigh Street in the township.

== Demographics ==
Historical population
Census	Pop.	Note	%±
2000	13,498		—
2010	13,505		0.1%
2020	13,621		0.9%
2022 (est.)	13,585		−0.3%
U.S. Decennial Census

As of the census of 2010, there were 13,505 people, 5,595 households, and 3,832 families residing in the township. The population density was 1,224.9 inhabitants per square mile (472.9/km^{2}). There were 5,595 housing units at an average density of 495.1 units per square mile (191.2 units/km^{2}). The racial makeup of the township was 91.39% White, 2.93% African American, 0.03% Native American, 1.60 Asian, 0.02% Pacific Islander, 2.40% from other races, and 1.63% from two or more races. Hispanic or Latino of any race were 2.14% of the population.

There were 5,333 households, out of which 24.79% had children under the age of 18 living with them, 60.25% were married couples living together, 7.61% had a female householder with no husband present, and 28.15% were non-families. 23.53% of all households were made up of individuals, and 12.11% had someone living alone who was 65 years of age or older. The average household size was 2.47 and the average family size was 2.91.

In the township, the population was spread out, with 18.84% under the age of 18, 7.02% from 18 to 24, 21.22% from 25 to 44, 32.90% from 45 to 64, and 20.01% who were 65 years of age or older. The median age was 48.2 years. For every 100 females, there were 99.1 males. For every 100 females age 18 and over, there were 96.5 males. The estimated median income for a household in the township in 2014 was $69,685, and the estimated median income for a family was $84,429. Males had an estimated median income of $54,869 versus $39,024 for females. The estimated per capita income for the township was $35,133. In 2014 it was estimated that 4.1% of families and 5.8% of the population were below the poverty line, including 8.0% of those under age 18 and 5.5% of those age 65 or over.

United States presidential election results for Salisbury Township, Lehigh County, Pennsylvania
Year	Republican		Democratic		Third party(ies)	
Year	No.	%	No.	%	No.	%
2024	4,194	51.25%	3,910	47.78%	79	0.97%
2020	4,162	50.22%	4,022	48.53%	103	1.24%
2016	3,838	53.02%	3,135	43.31%	266	3.67%
2012	3,485	51.31%	3,222	47.44%	85	1.25%
2008	3,401	47.35%	3,669	51.09%	112	1.56%
2004	3,605	51.00%	3,420	48.39%	43	0.61%

== Geography ==
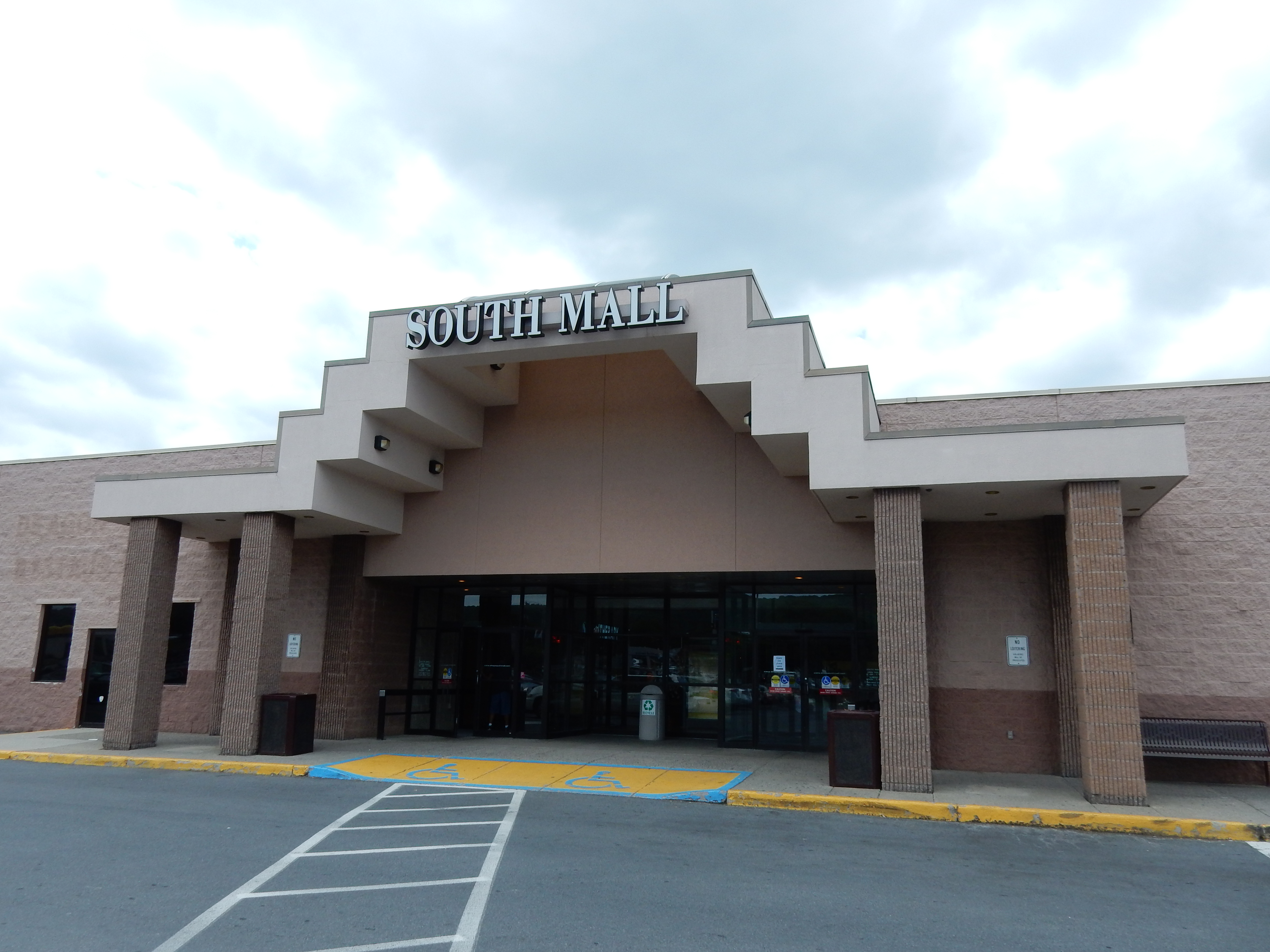
South Mall's main entrance in Salisbury Township in June 2015

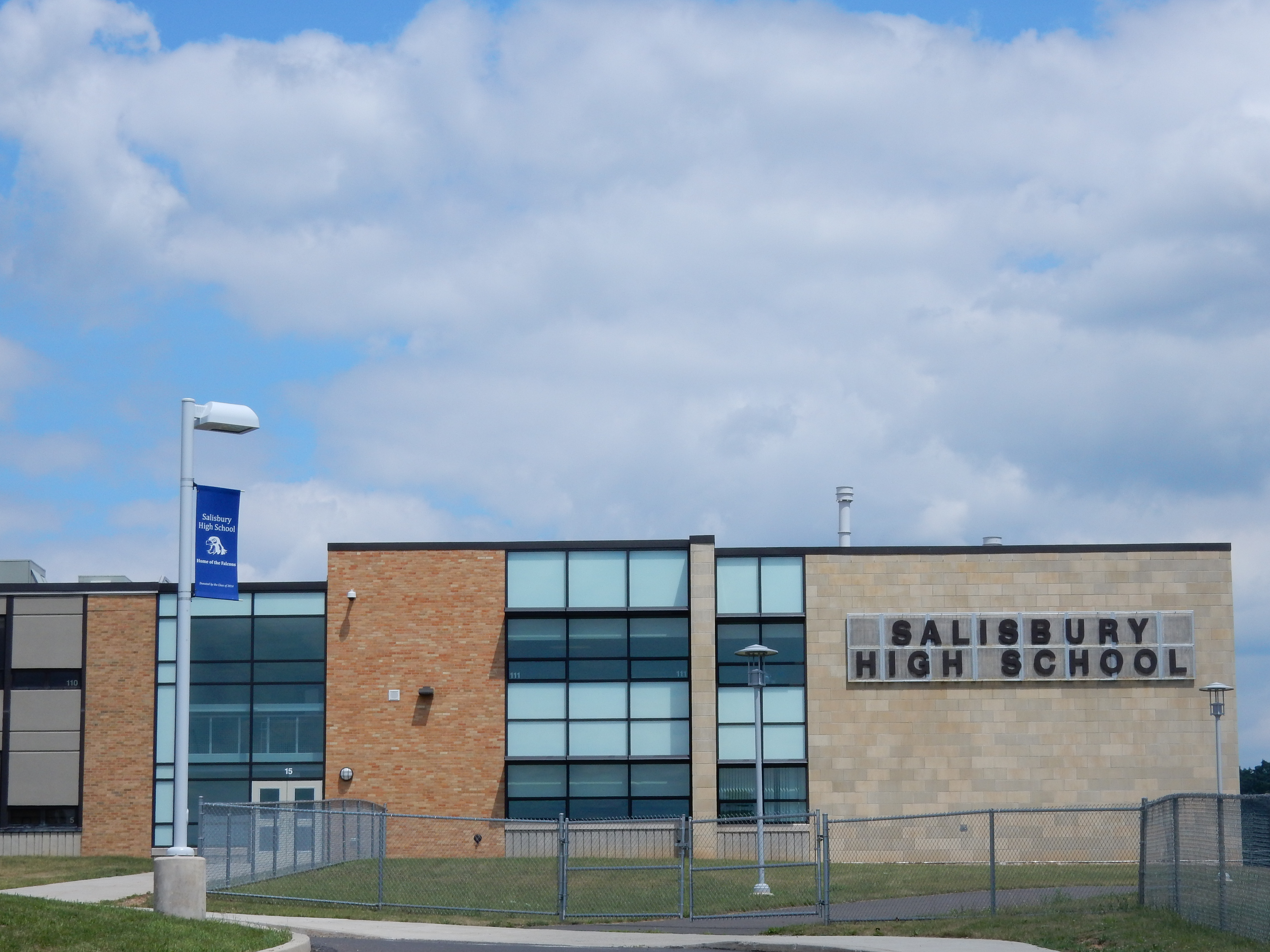
Salisbury High School in June 2015

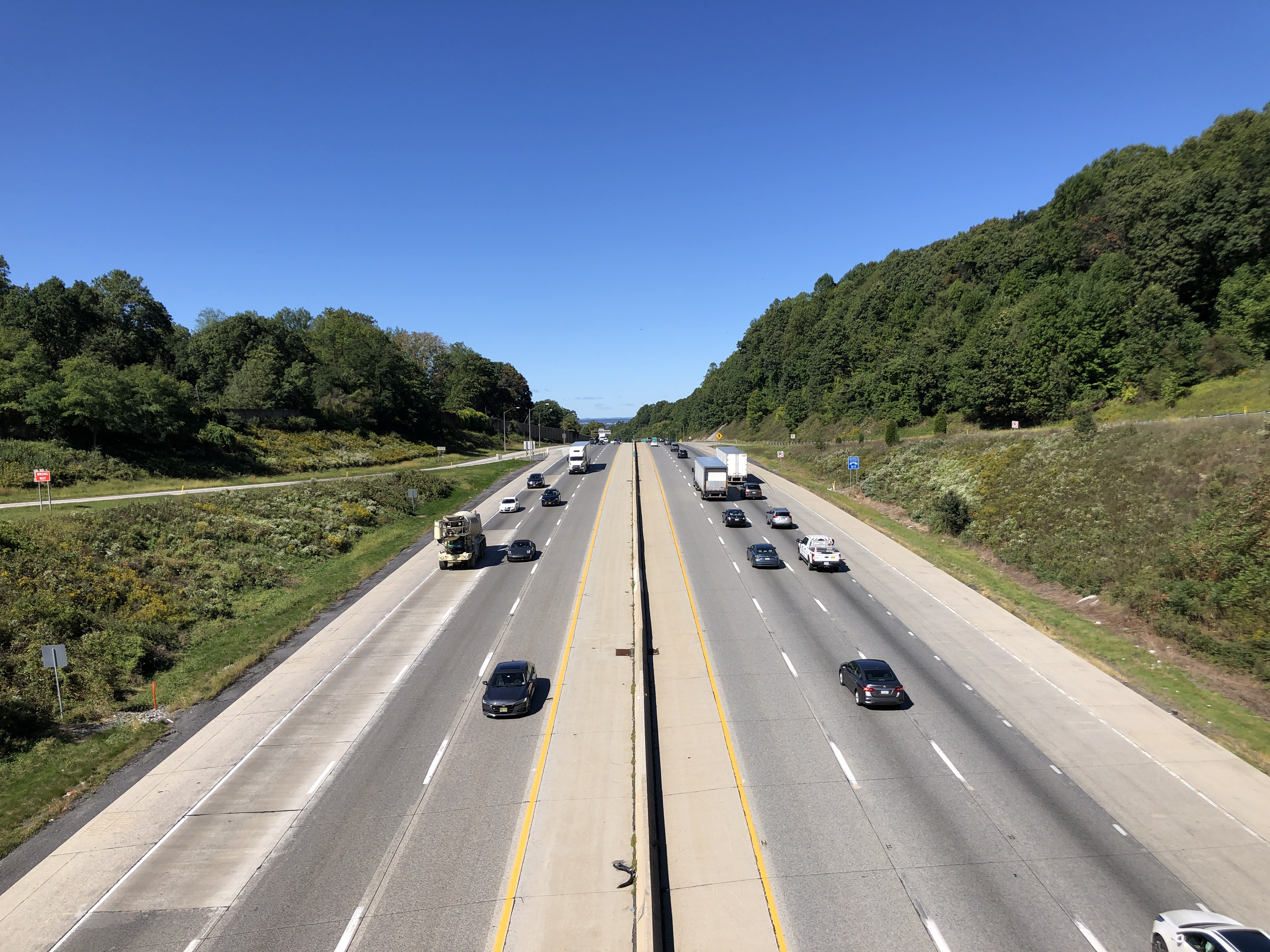
I-78 West at PA Route 309 in Salisbury Township

According to the U.S. Census Bureau, the township has a total area of 11.3 square miles (29.2 km^{2}), of which 11.2 square miles (28.9 km^{2}) are land and 0.1 square miles (0.3 km^{2}), or 0.87%, are water. It is drained by the Lehigh River, which separates it from Bethlehem and the east side of Allentown, and borders Upper Saucon Township on South Mountain. Elevations range from approximately 220 feet (67 m) above sea level on the river to 1,030 feet (310 m) in Big Rock County Park.

Emmaus and Allentown share a border, separating Salisbury into two demographically distinct non-contiguous portions. The township's villages of Farmington, Gauff Hill and Summit Lawn are in the eastern portion. The CDP of Dorneyville is in both the extreme northwestern part of the township and in South Whitehall Township.

=== Climate ===
Salisbury Township has a hot-summer humid continental climate (Dfa) and is in hardiness zone 6b. The average monthly temperature in the vicinity of South Mall ranges from 29.0 °F (−1.7 °C) in January to 73.7 °F (23.2 °C) in July.

=== Adjacent municipalities ===
- Fountain Hill (northeast)
- Bethlehem (northeast)
- Allentown (north and northwest)
- South Whitehall Township (west)
- Lower Macungie Township (southwest)
- Emmaus (south)
- Upper Milford Township (south)
- Upper Saucon Township (southeast)
- Lower Saucon Township, Northampton County (east)

== Education ==
The township is served by the Salisbury Township School District. Salisbury High School serves grades 9 through 12.

== Notable people ==
- Ian Riccaboni, Ring of Honor commentator

== Transportation ==
As of 2022, there were 77.68 miles (125.01 km) of public roads in Salisbury Township, of which 12.64 miles (20.34 km) were maintained by the Pennsylvania Department of Transportation (PennDOT) and 65.04 miles (104.67 km) were maintained by the township.

Salisbury's major thoroughfares include Interstate 78/Pennsylvania Route 309, Pennsylvania Route 29, Pennsylvania Route 145 (Pike Avenue), Emmaus Avenue, Susquehanna Street/Broadway, Lehigh Street, 24th Street, and Cedar Crest Boulevard. The township is served by multiple LANta bus routes.

== Gallery ==
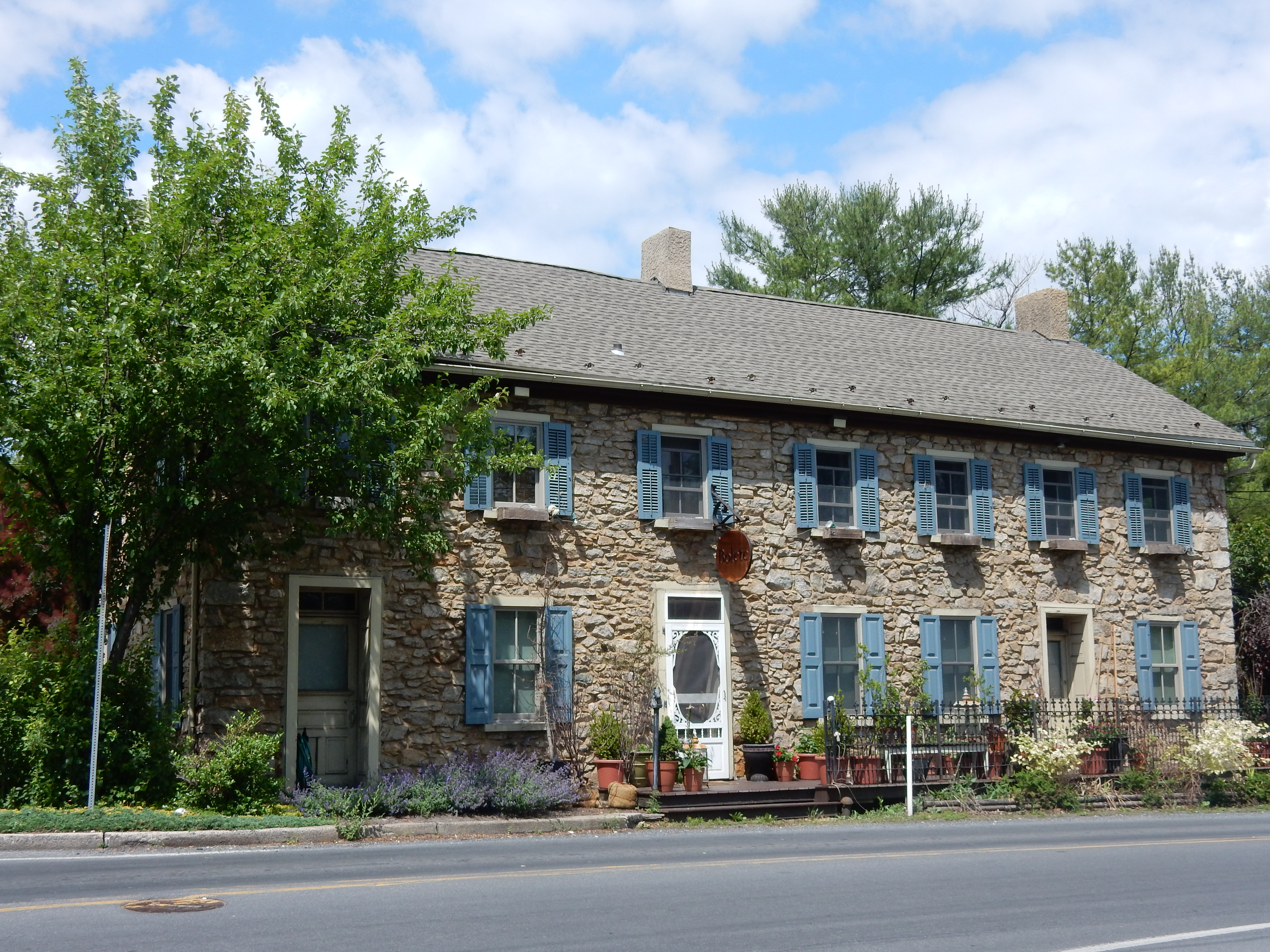
Bolete Restaurant and Inn in Gauff Hill

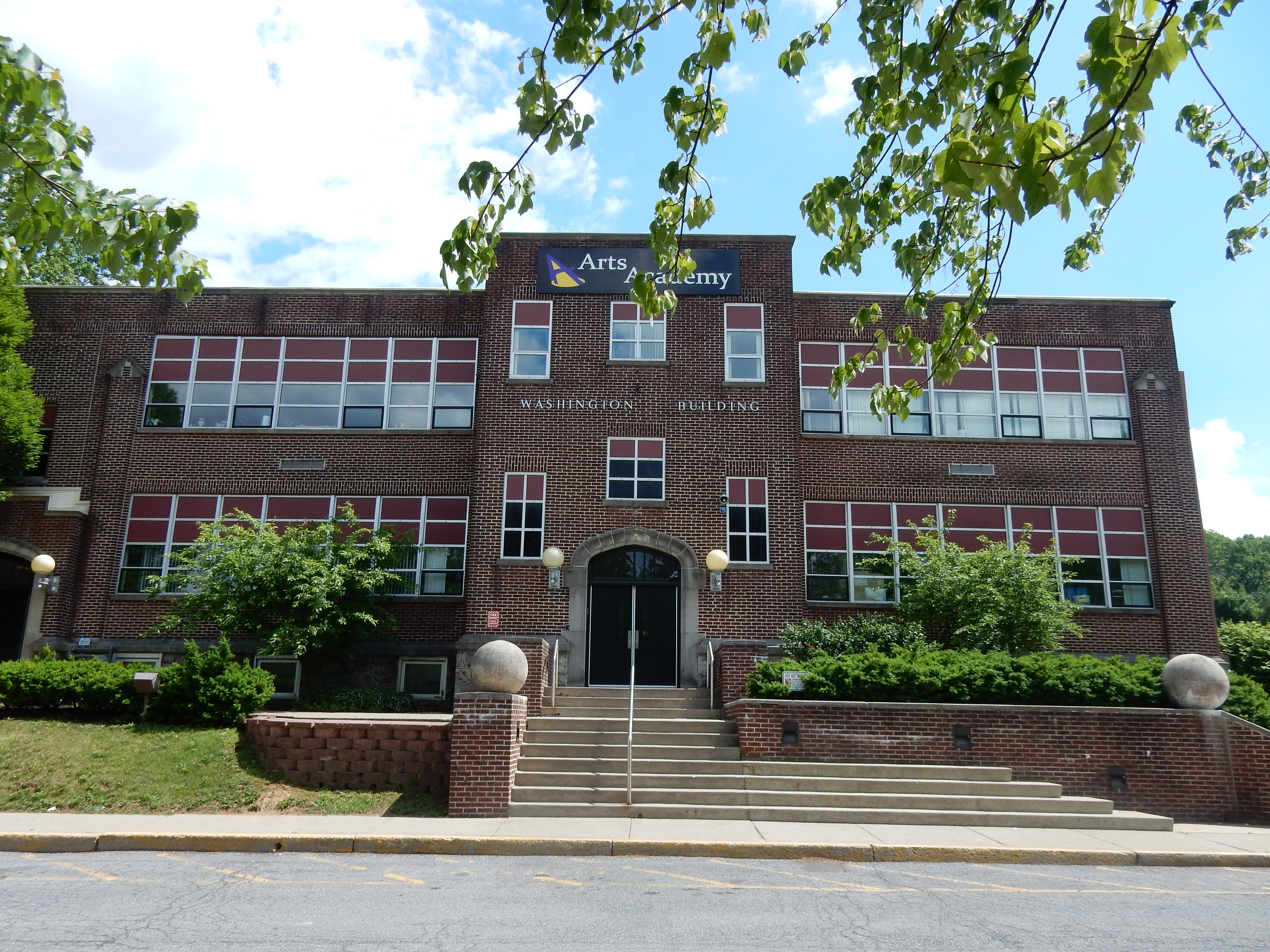
Arts Academy Charter School in Gauff Hill

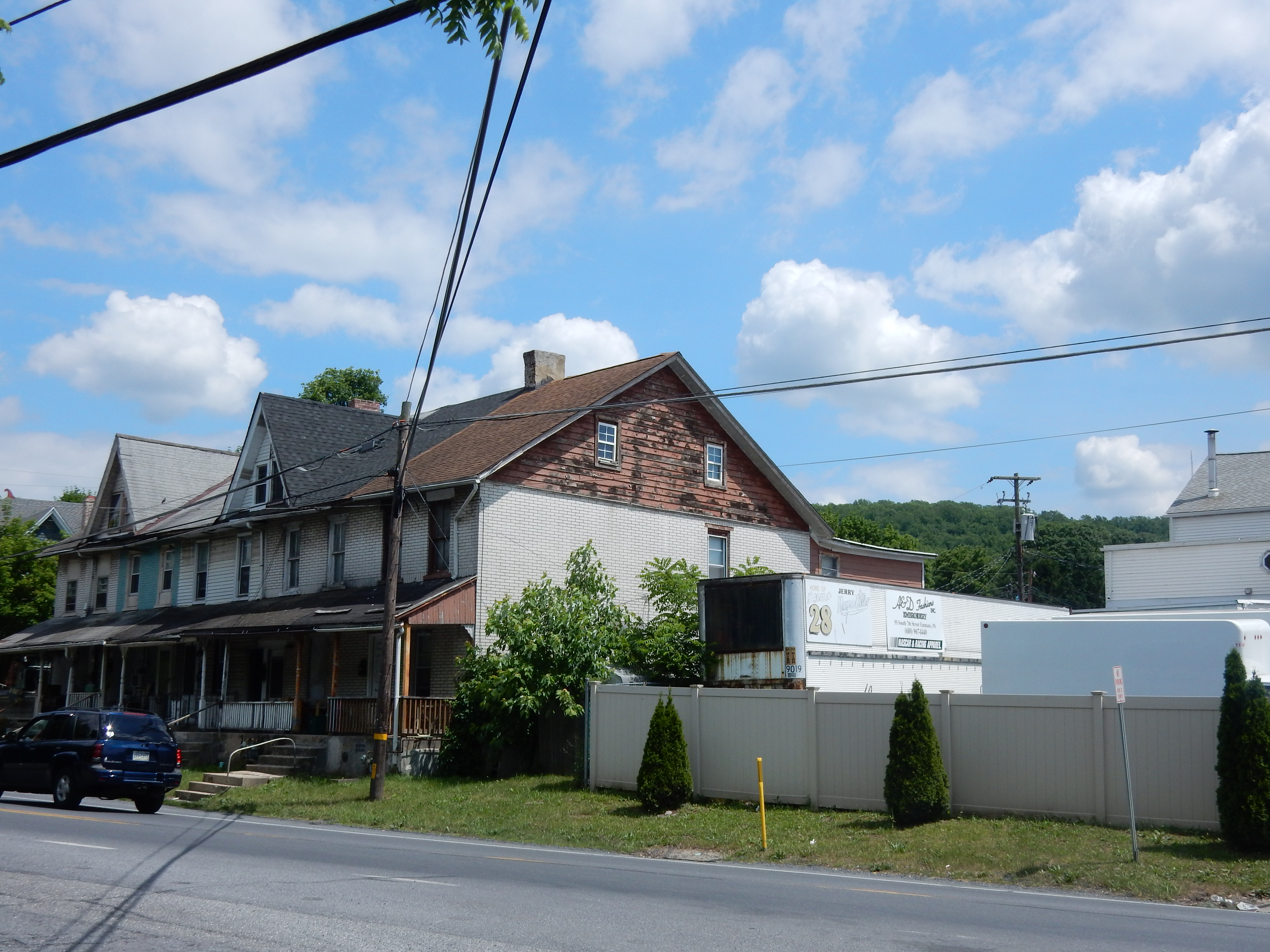
E. Emmaus Ave

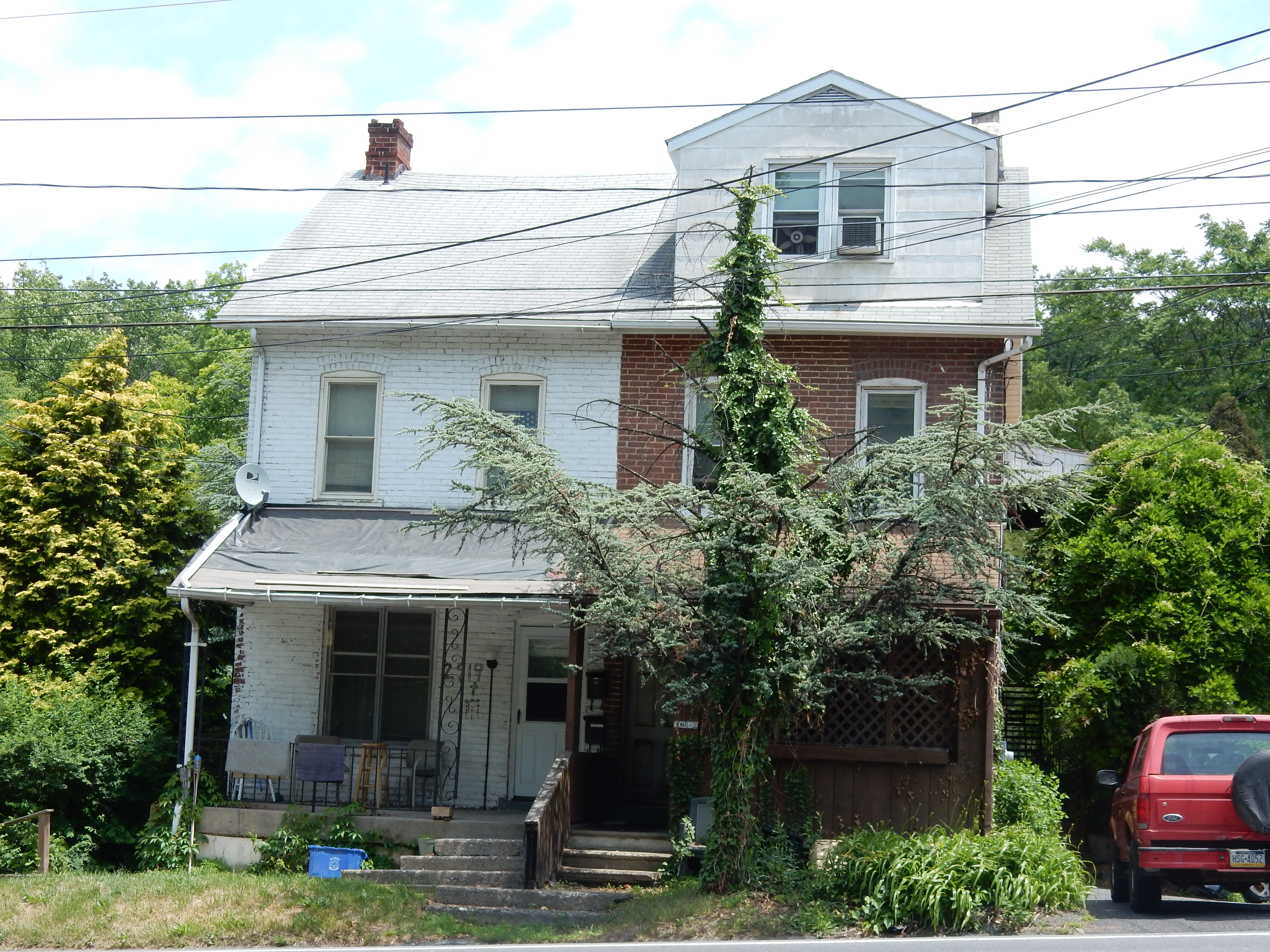
Residence at Summit Lawn

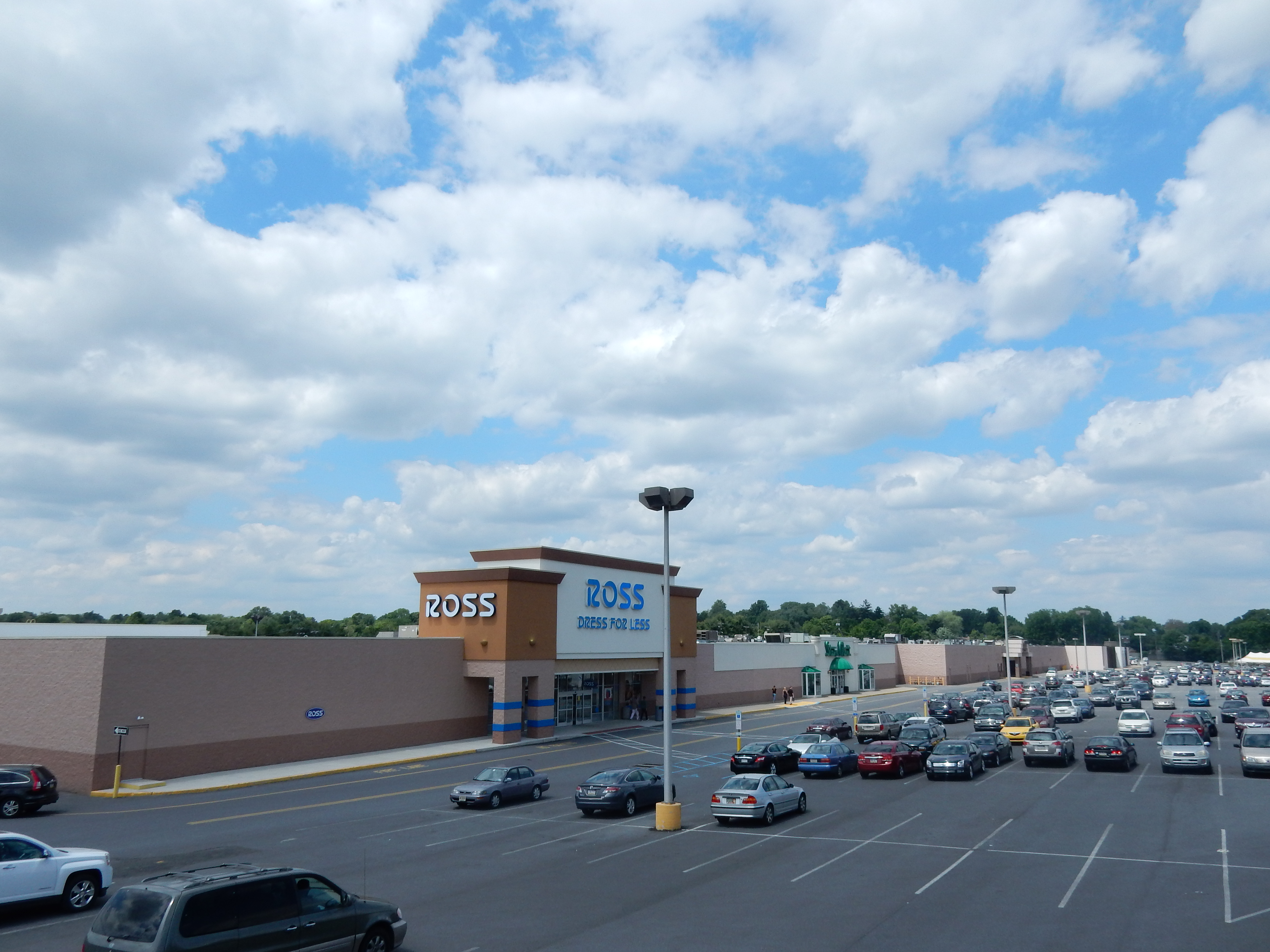
South Mall

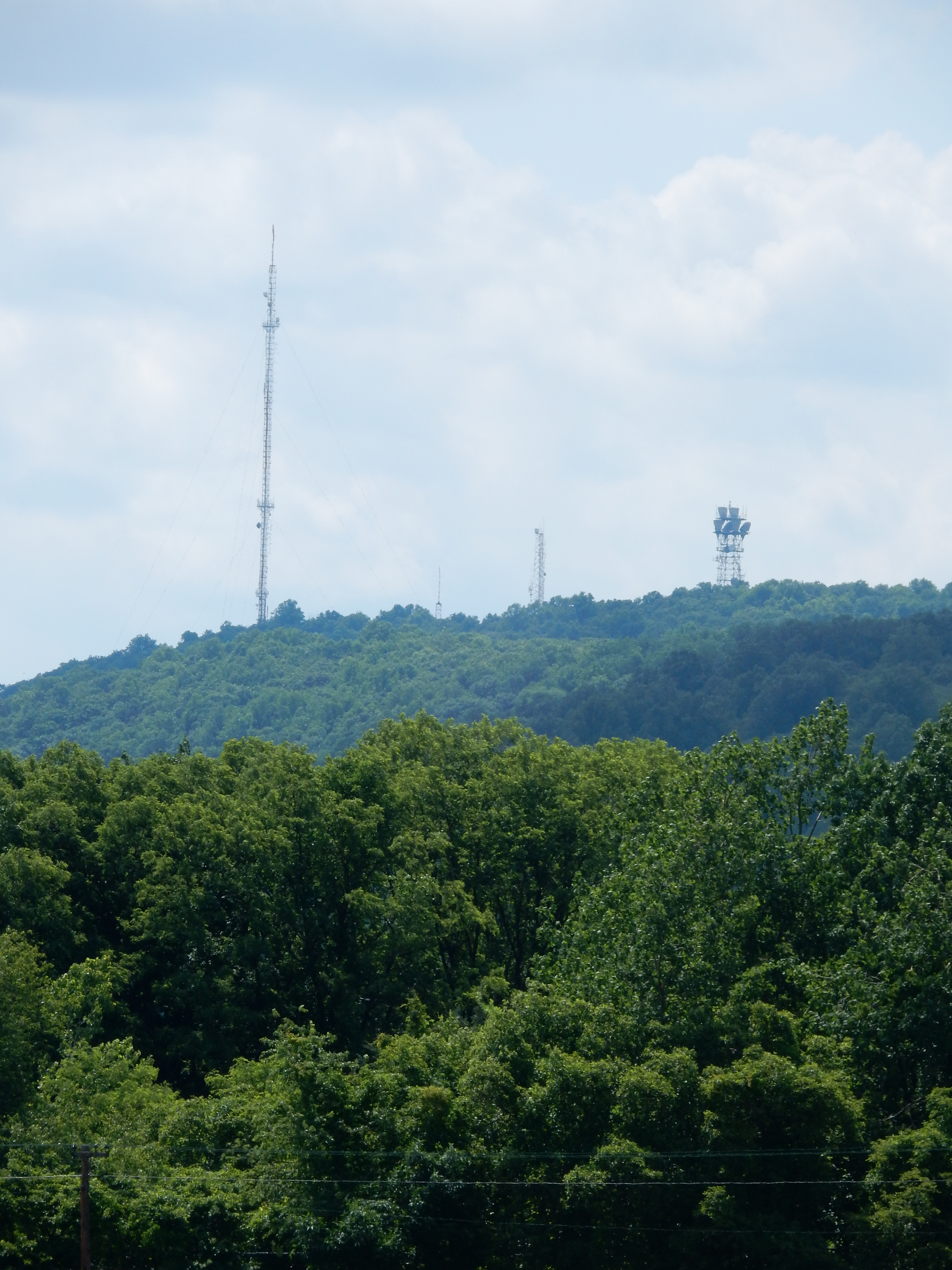
South Mountain peak with WFMZ-TV 69 transmitters at Summit Lawn
