= Thomas Crowther (judge) =

British barrister

Thomas Edward Crowther KC (born May 1970) is a practising British barrister. He was a Circuit Judge from 2013 to 2018 and chaired the Independent Inquiry into Telford Child Sexual Exploitation from 2019 to 2022.

== Career ==
Crowther qualified B.Sc.(Hons), B.A.(Hons) from Exeter University. He became a barrister in 1993 and Queen's Counsel in 2013. Crowther was a founder member of Apex Chambers, Cardiff in 2007 and head of chambers in 2012–13.

He held fee-paid (part time) judicial roles as a judge of the Asylum and Immigration Tribunal (later the First-Tier Tribunal, Immigration and Asylum Chamber) 2006–2013, as a Recorder 2009–2013, and as an associate Judge of the Sovereign Bases of Akrotiri and Dhekelia 2015–2020.

As a Circuit Judge he was assigned to the Wales Circuit on 24 July 2013 and resigned from the circuit bench on 5 December 2018 to return to legal practice.

Following return to legal practice, Crowther joined Serjeants' Inn Chambers, London, in February 2019. Since 2023 he has been a member of 23ES.

In June 2019, he was appointed as Chair of the Independent Inquiry into Telford Child Sexual Exploitation. The Inquiry's Report was published in four volumes in July 2022, and he published a review of implementation of recommendations in July 2024.

He was a panel chair for the Council of the Inns of Court Disciplinary Pool from 2020-2026.
