= Lehigh Valley =

Coordinates: 40°42′N 75°30′W

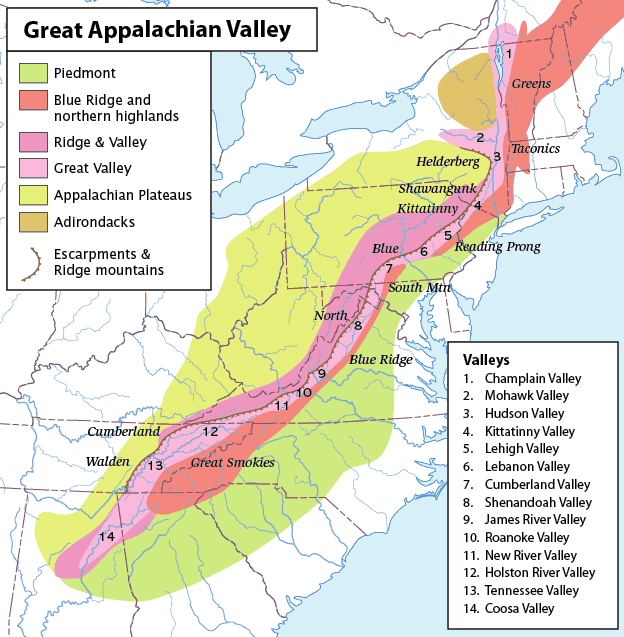
- The Great Appalachian Valley with the Lehigh Valley (5) south of the Ridge-and-Valley Appalachians between Kittatinny Valley (4) to the north and Lebanon Valley (6) to the south
Interactive Map of Allentown–Bethlehem–
East Stroudsburg, PA–NJ CSA
Allentown–Bethlehem–Easton, PA–NJ MSA
City of Allentown
City of Bethlehem
City of Easton
East Stroudsburg MSA
City of East Stroudsburg

Geography
- Location: Lehigh County; Northampton County
- Population centers: Allentown, Bethlehem, Easton
- Borders on: Ridge-and-Valley Appalachians Blue Mountain (north); South Mountain (south); Delaware River (east); Lebanon Valley (west)

The Lehigh Valley (/ˈliːhaɪ/) is a geographic and metropolitan region formed by the Lehigh River in Lehigh and Northampton counties in eastern Pennsylvania. It is a component valley of the Great Appalachian Valley bounded to its north by Blue Mountain, to its south by South Mountain, to its west by Lebanon Valley, and to its east by the Delaware River and Warren County, New Jersey. The Lehigh Valley is about 40 miles (64 km) long and 20 miles (32 km) wide. The Lehigh Valley's largest city is Allentown, the third-largest city in Pennsylvania and the county seat of Lehigh County, with a population of 125,845 residents as of the 2020 census.

The Allentown–Bethlehem–Easton metropolitan area, which includes the Lehigh Valley, is Pennsylvania's third-most populous metropolitan area after Philadelphia and Pittsburgh, and the nation's 66th-largest metropolitan area, with a population of 886,418 as of 2023. Lehigh County is among Pennsylvania's fastest-growing counties, and the Lehigh Valley leads Pennsylvania in terms of population growth in the 18- to 34-year-old demographic, which constitutes a significant portion of the labor workforce. The region's core population centers are located in southern and central Lehigh and Northampton counties along Interstate 78, Interstate 476, Pennsylvania Route 309, and U.S. Route 22.

The Lehigh Valley has historically been a global leader in steel and other heavy manufacturing industries, which represented a considerable portion of its employment and economic production for most of the 20th century. Beginning in the early 1980s, however, the region's heavy manufacturing sector experienced a rapid downfall, highlighted by the downsizing, bankruptcy, and ultimate closure of Bethlehem Steel, the world's second-largest steel manufacturer for most of the 20th century, and other Lehigh Valley–based manufacturing companies. Throughout the late 20th century, the Lehigh Valley's economy struggled considerably, and it was often cited as one of the most prominent examples of the impact of deindustrial economic decline in the nation's Rust Belt during the late 20th century.

In the early 21st century, the Lehigh Valley's economy began rebounding, and it emerged as a national center for the U.S. logistics industry, especially in warehousing and intermodal transport. As of 2023, the Lehigh Valley's gross domestic product (GDP) was $55.7 billion, led by its manufacturing sector, which comprised $9 billion, or 16 percent. In March 2024, the Lehigh Valley was named the nation's top mid-sized market for economic development by Site Selection magazine based on its number of projects that met criteria for job creation, investment, and size over the previous year.

The region's primary commercial airport is Lehigh Valley International Airport, formerly Allentown–Bethlehem–Easton International Airport, in Hanover Township, which in 2023 was utilized by 930,946 passengers and trafficked over 275,000 pounds of cargo, an all-time cargo record for the airport.

The Lehigh Valley is located in the center of the U.S. Northeast megalopolis, providing ease of access and close proximity to many of the nation's largest population centers, airports, terminals, railways, and seaports, including New York City, the nation's largest city, which is 80 miles (130 km) to its east, and Philadelphia, the nation's sixth-most populous city, which is 50 miles (80 km) to its southeast. The region is located geographically within a one-day drive to over a third of the U.S. population and over half of Canada's population, which has been a factor in its 21st century emergence as a North American leader in light manufacturing and commercial distribution.

Since its settlement in the 18th century, the Lehigh Valley has been the birthplace or home to several notable Americans who have proven influential across a broad range of fields, including academia, art and music, business, government and politics, the military, professional and Olympic-level athletics, and other fields.

== History ==
=== Colonial era ===
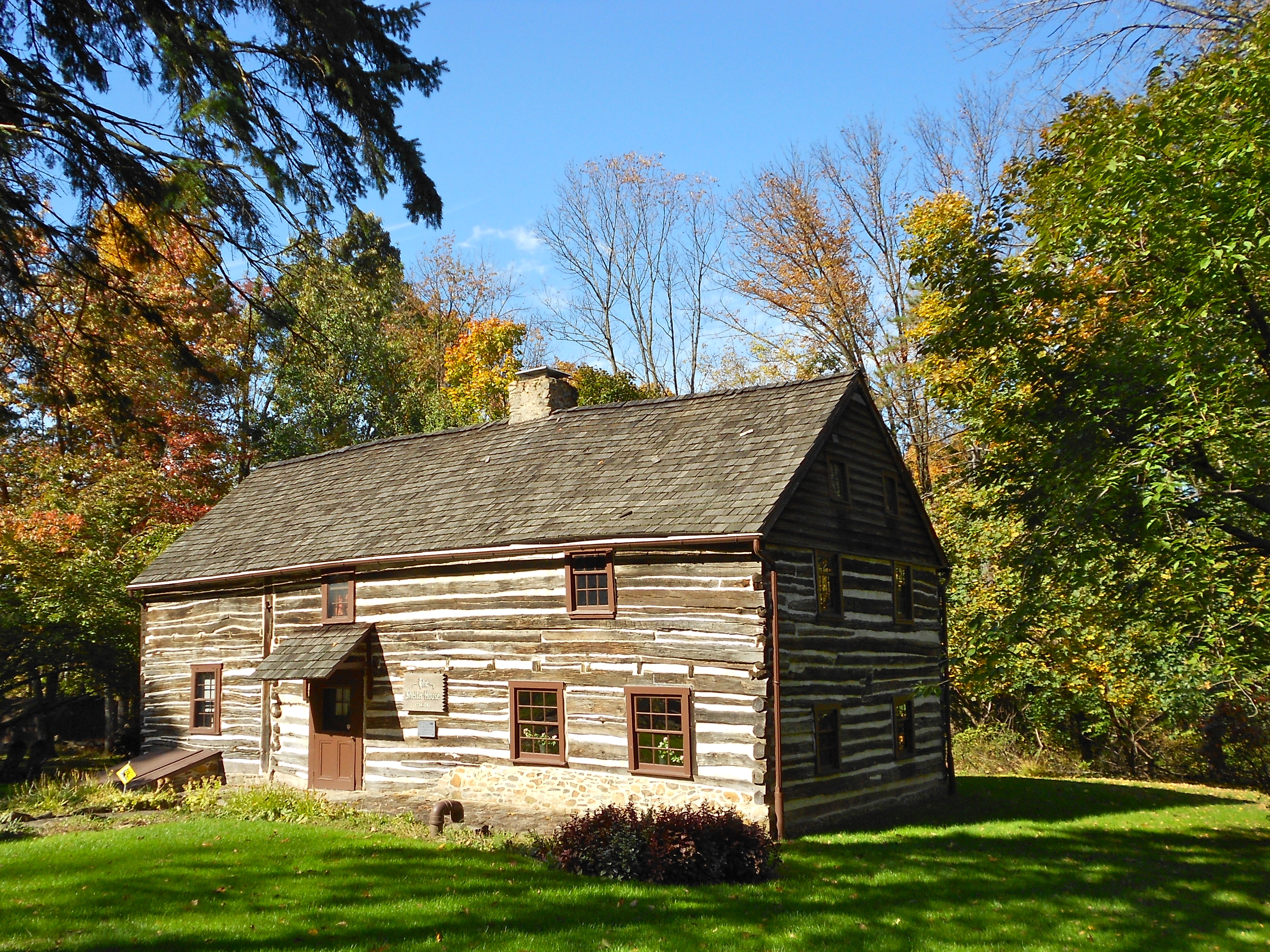
Constructed by Pennsylvania German settlers in 1734, Shelter House in Emmaus is the Lehigh Valley's oldest continuously occupied building structure and one of the oldest in the state.

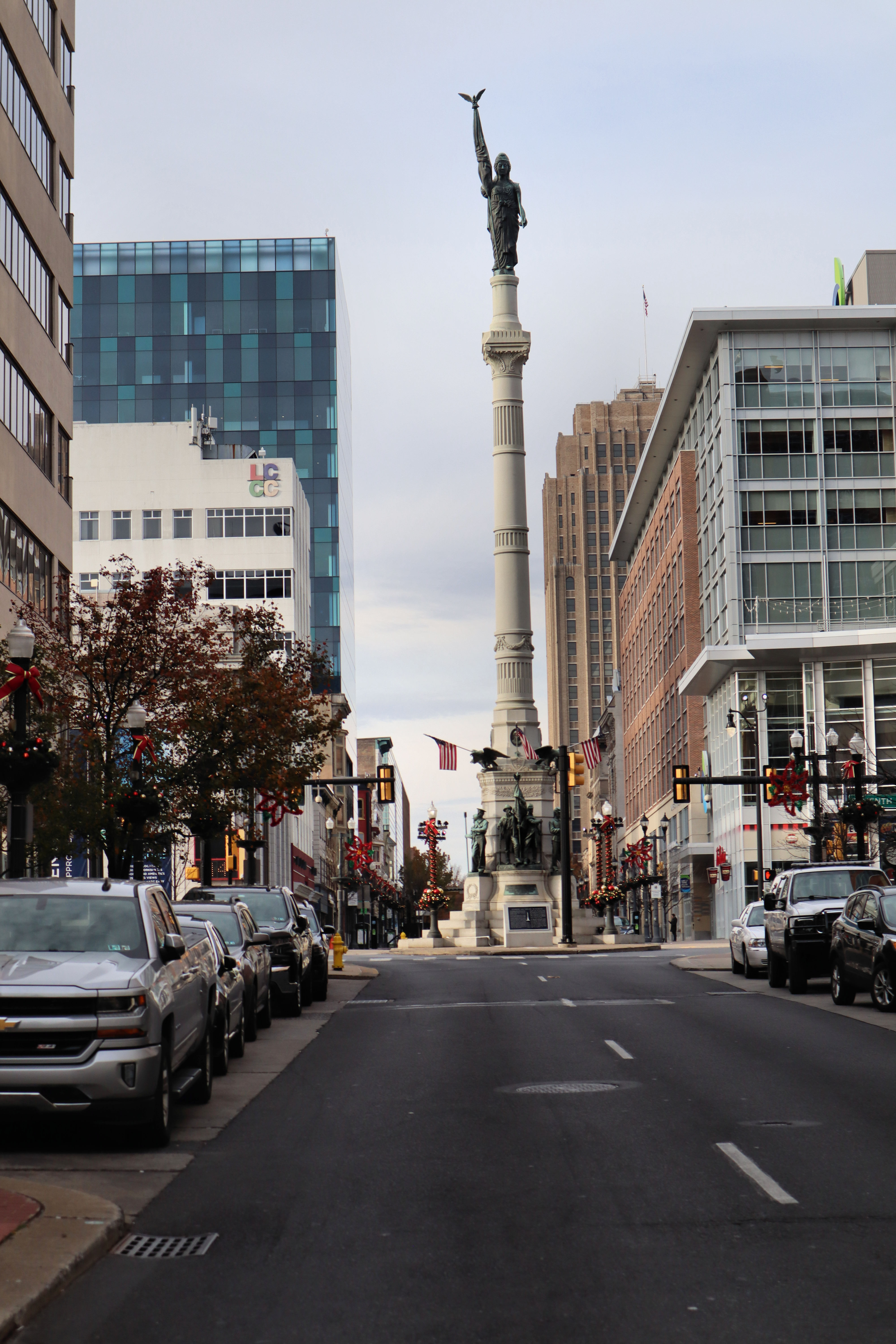
The Soldiers and Sailors Monument, erected in 1899 at 7th and Hamilton streets in Center City Allentown, honors men from Allentown and its suburbs killed in their volunteer service in the 47th Pennsylvania Infantry Regiment and other Union army units during the American Civil War.

The Lehigh Valley was settled over the first half of the 18th century largely by German immigrants fleeing war and religious persecution. Prior to their arrival, the region was inhabited by Lenape Indian tribes, who hunted, fished, and quarried jasper in the region. The region was initially established in 1682 as part of Bucks County. Shelter House in Emmaus, constructed in 1734 by Pennsylvania German settlers, is the oldest still-standing building structure in the Lehigh Valley and believed to be one of the oldest in the state.

In 1737, sons of provincial Pennsylvania founder William Penn acquired much of the Lehigh Valley in the Walking Purchase during the colonial period. Lenape Indians subsequently retaliated with raids against European settlers in the region throughout the 1750s and early 1760s, but were moved out of the region by the mid-1760s. In 1752, the region became part of Northampton County, and Lehigh County was later separated from Northampton County and formally established in 1812.

=== American Revolutionary War ===
Allentown and its surrounding communities played an important and historic role in the emergence of the American Revolution. Some of the first resistance to British colonialism began in Allentown and its surrounding Lehigh County communities in the Lehigh Valley. As early as June 21, 1774, patriot forces in Allentown began meeting to formulate resistance plans to British colonial governance. On December 21, 1774, a Committee of Observation was formally established by Allentown-area patriot militias. Following the signing of the Declaration of Independence, the Colonial British government in Allentown began dissolving and these patriot militias seized control, pressuring Tories out of the region.

In recognition of the strong pro-revolutionary sentiment in the region, Easton was one of only three designated locations, along with Philadelphia and Trenton, New Jersey, where the Declaration was read aloud in public for the first time on July 8, 1776 at noon.

Following their victory at the Battle of Trenton several months later, Washington and his Continental Army staff traveled through the present-day Lehigh Valley, proceeding up Lehigh Street, which was then called Water Street. Washington and his staff stopped at the foot of Lehigh Street at a large spring on what is the present-day Wire Mill Arboretum in Allentown. They rested there, watered their horses, and then proceeded to their post of duty. Allentown supported the Revolution, establishing the first hospitals for the treatment of wounded Continental Army troops at various city locations, including at the current location of the Farr Building at 739 Hamilton Street.

As the Revolutionary War progressed, Washington and his commanders also established two POW camps in Allentown, one at 8th and Hamilton streets and another on Gordon Street, to house captured Hessian mercenaries. In addition to visiting Allentown after his victory at the Battle of Trenton, Washington returned to the city and region several additional times during and following the Revolution.

Allentown also played a historical role in protecting the Liberty Bell from British capture following the fall of Philadelphia to the British Army on September 26, 1777, concealing the Liberty Bell for nine months from September 1777 to June 1778, under floor boards in Allentown's Zion Reformed Church. After Washington and the Continental Army's defeat at the Battle of Brandywine on September 11, 1777, the revolutionary capital of Philadelphia was left defenseless and Pennsylvania's Supreme Executive Council, anticipating Philadelphia's fall, ordered that eleven Philadelphia bells, including the Liberty Bell, then known as the State House Bell, be taken down and moved to present-day Allentown, which was then called Northampton Towne. In Allentown, the Liberty Bell and other bells were hidden under floorboards at Zion Reformed Church on West Hamilton Street to protect them from being seized and melted down by the British Army for use as munitions.

=== American Civil War ===
The region again proved influential in the American Civil War. Following the Union army's defeat at the Battle of Fort Sumter and Abraham Lincoln's proclamation on April 15, 1861 calling for state militia to provide 75,000 volunteers to defend the national capital in Washington, D.C., Allentown immediately deployed its Allen Infantry, which defended Washington, D.C. from Confederate attack following Fort Sumter's fall. Also known as the Allen Guards, the Allen Infantry mustered in for duty on April 18, 1861. During the late summer and early fall of 1861, members of this unit and other volunteers from within and beyond the Lehigh Valley came together to form the 47th Pennsylvania Infantry Regiment, which was established on August 5 and later proved influential in expanding the Union army's reach into the Deep South, permitting it to launch successful attacks against Confederate positions in the Battle of St. Johns Bluff in 1862 and throughout the Red River campaign in the Trans-Mississippi theater and Sheridan's Shenadoah Valley campaign across Virginia in 1864. These victories helped to tip the Civil War in the Union's favor.

On October 19, 1899, a monument in honor of the Lehigh Valley men killed in their volunteer service to the Union's preservation, the Soldiers and Sailors Monument, was erected at Seventh and Hamilton streets in Center City Allentown, where it still stands.

=== Industrial Revolution ===
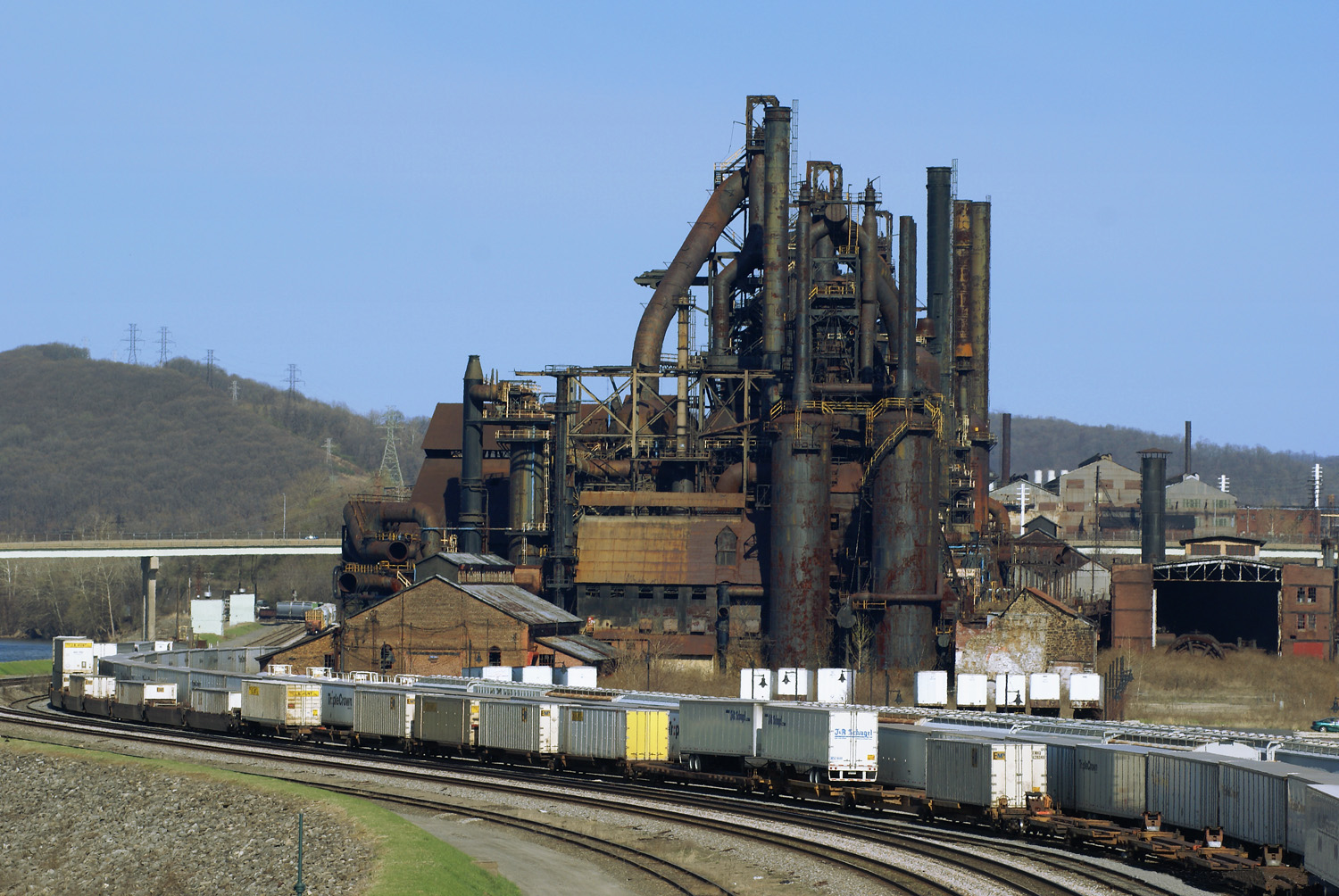
Bethlehem Steel in Bethlehem, was the world's second-largest steel manufacturer for most of the 20th century, and played an influential role in building many of the nation's most prominent buildings, bridges, ships and military equipment that contributed to the rise of America's defense strength.

The opening of the Lehigh Canal in 1827 contributed significantly to transforming Allentown and the Lehigh Valley from a rural agricultural area dominated by German-speaking people into one of the nation's first urbanized industrialized areas. The Lehigh Valley underwent significant industrialization throughout the 19th and most of the 20th centuries and was a major manufacturing hub in the American Industrial Revolution.

The Lehigh Valley is named for the Lehigh River, which runs through the region. It owes much of its development and history to anthracite coal, timber, and ore that was only commercially possible with the development of the Lehigh Canal and the Lehigh Valley's extensive railway infrastructure that permitted these minerals and later the region's manufactured steel to be transported for sale in major national and overseas markets.

The Lehigh Canal operated into the Great Depression, feeding ports up and down the Delaware River, the Pennsylvania Canal, and transoceanic demand, and was integral to the industrialization of the greater Delaware Valley region. Morris Canal, the 22–23 miles (35–37 km) anthracite coal feeder of Delaware and Raritan Canal. and locks at New Hope on the Delaware Canal were built to fuel the anthracite energy needs in Trenton, Newark, Jersey City, and New York City.

In 1899, Bethlehem Steel was formed in Bethlehem in the Lehigh Valley. The company developed into the nation's second-largest manufacturer of steel, and its steel was used in developing many of the nation's earliest and largest infrastructure and building projects, including the Empire State Building, Madison Square Garden, and Rockefeller Center in New York City, Merchandise Mart in Chicago, the George Washington, Verrazzano, and Golden Gate Bridges, and warships and other military equipment that proved essential in American-led victories in both world wars.

=== Bethlehem Steel's downfall ===
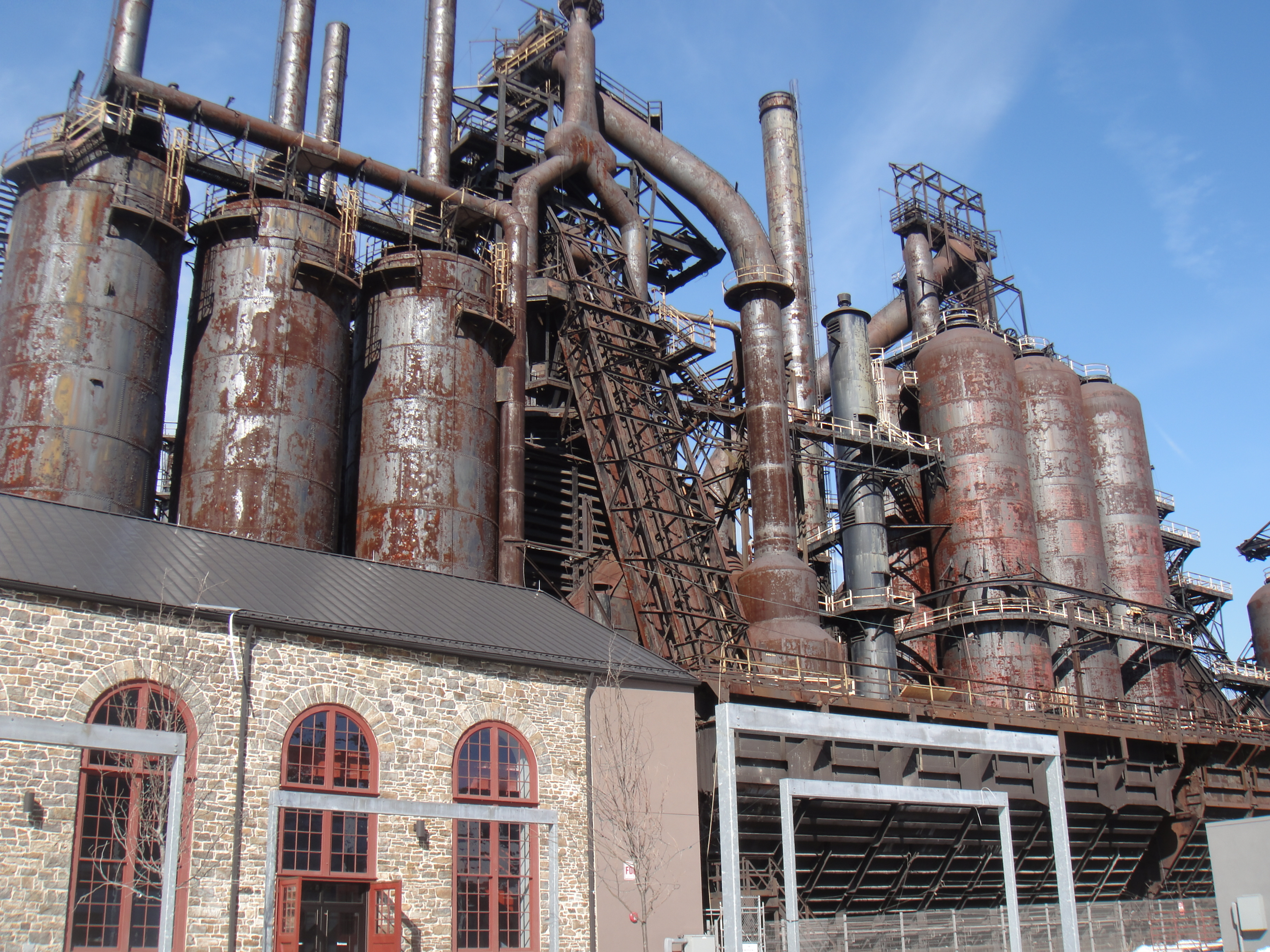
Bethlehem Steel's now dormant steel stacks in March 2014

The Lehigh Valley was known historically for its production of steel, Portland cement, silk, and apparel. Bethlehem Steel, founded in 1899 and based in Bethlehem, was a foundation of the Lehigh Valley's economy for nearly a century from 1899 through the early 1980s. At the pinnacle of its success, Bethlehem Steel was the nation's second-largest and one of the world's largest steel manufacturers. Bethlehem Steel was instrumental in the development of many of the nation's most prominent 20th century infrastructure projects. Its steel was used to build 28 Liberty Street, Chrysler Building, the Empire State Building, Madison Square Garden, Rockefeller Center, and the Waldorf Astoria hotel in New York City and Merchandise Mart in Chicago. Among major bridges, the company's steel was used to construct the George Washington Bridge and Verrazzano–Narrows Bridge in New York City, the Golden Gate Bridge in San Francisco, and the Peace Bridge between Buffalo and Fort Erie, Ontario. The Roosevelt administration relied heavily on Bethlehem Steel during World War II, utilizing the company to produce the steel necessary for shipbuilding, ammunition, and other military equipment that proved essential to the Allies' ability to prevail in these conflicts.

In 1982, following nearly a century of global leadership, growth, and profitability in steel manufacturing, Bethlehem Steel abruptly reported operating losses of $1.5 billion, citing foreign competition from Asian economies and costly U.S. governmental regulations and labor costs for the losses. The company abruptly reduced operations, resulting in considerable Lehigh Valley layoffs and a dramatic related economic downturn in the region.

Bethlehem Steel continued functioning on a vastly reduced scale for a period, but ultimately ceased steel manufacturing entirely at its primary Bethlehem-based manufacturing plant in 1995. In 2001, the company filed for bankruptcy protection and, in 2003, the company was dissolved. In the late 20th and early 21st centuries, the downturn and ultimate demise of Bethlehem Steel, once one of the most iconic and prominent symbols of American global economic power and leadership, emerged as an example cited by those who believe American global economic leadership is now in either gradual or even rapid descent.

=== 21st century ===
In the early 2000s, seeking to replace the heavy manufacturing companies that had been the region's foundation for decades, the Lehigh Valley began developing other economic sectors, including financial services, health care, life sciences, and technology. The Lehigh Valley also began emerging as a national warehouse and distribution hub, due in part to its proximity to many of the largest U.S. markets and relatively lower operating costs compared to other Northeast U.S. regions. More recently, a movement to reestablish manufacturing activities in the U.S., driven by customer demand for American-made products, faster product delivery, increased overseas wages, and inflated costs and extended timeframes for shipping has led to some renewed growth in the Valley's manufacturing sector. Several large companies from China and Germany have invested tens of millions of dollars into developing significant operations in the Lehigh Valley, which has generated thousands of new jobs in the region.

In 2023, U.S. News & World Report ranked the Lehigh Valley the ninth-best place in the nation to retire. Also in 2023, realtor.com ranked the Lehigh Valley "the 21st hottest housing market" in the nation.

== Geography ==
The Lehigh Valley is geologically and geographically part of the Great Appalachian Valley, a geographic region made up of limestone that stretches along the eastern edge of the Appalachian Mountains. The Lehigh Valley is so named because it is located geographically within an actual valley formed by the Lehigh River that lies between two mountain ridges, Blue Mountain in the Valley's north and South Mountain in the Valley's south. The Lehigh Valley is the lower part of the drainage basin of the Lehigh River.

== Cities and location ==
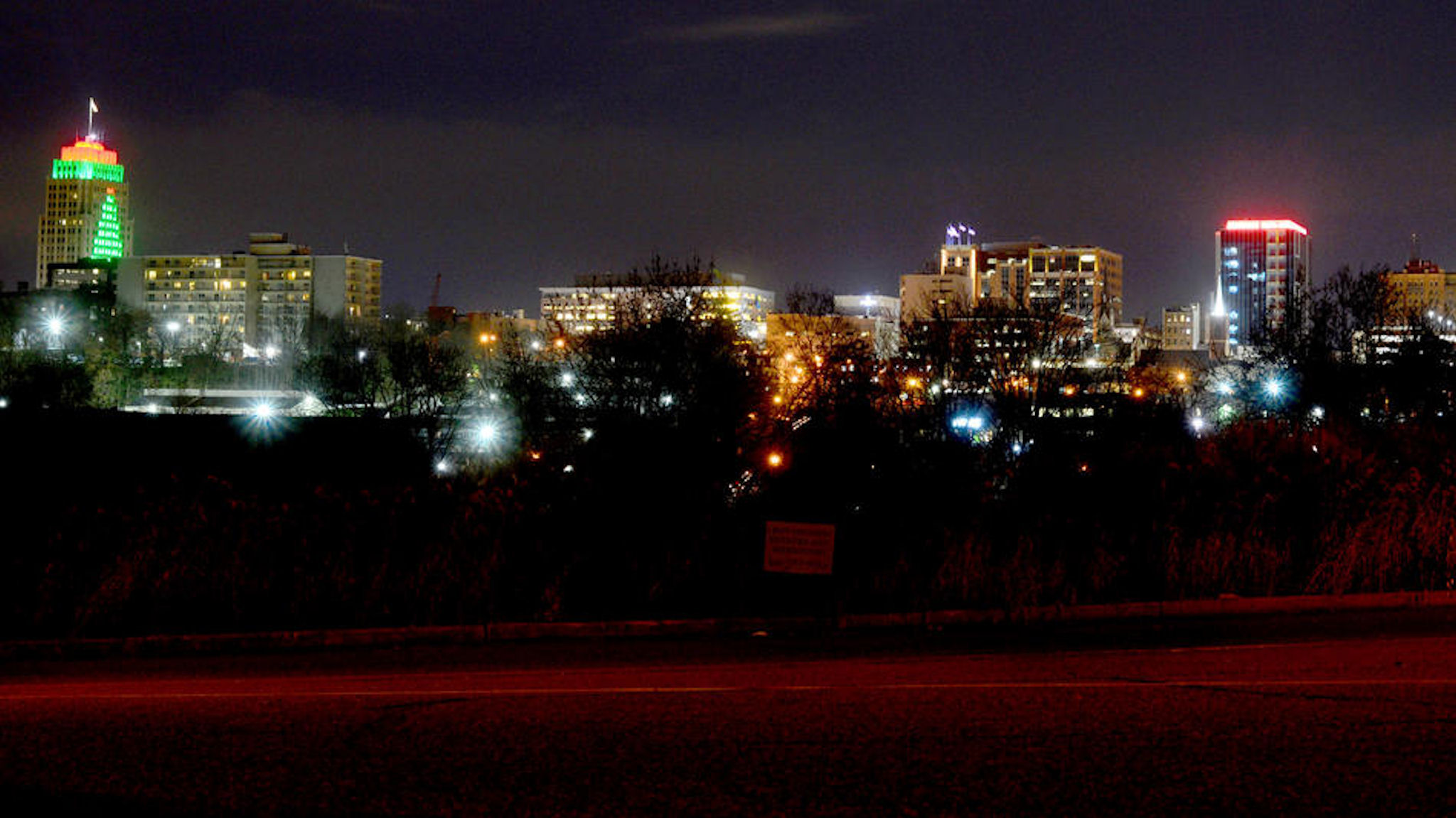
The city skyline of Allentown, the largest city in the Lehigh Valley and third-largest city in Pennsylvania at Christmas 2017

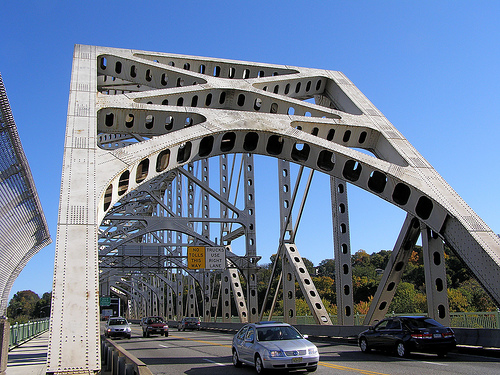
The Easton–Phillipsburg Toll Bridge connects Easton and Phillipsburg, New Jersey, in the Lehigh Valley

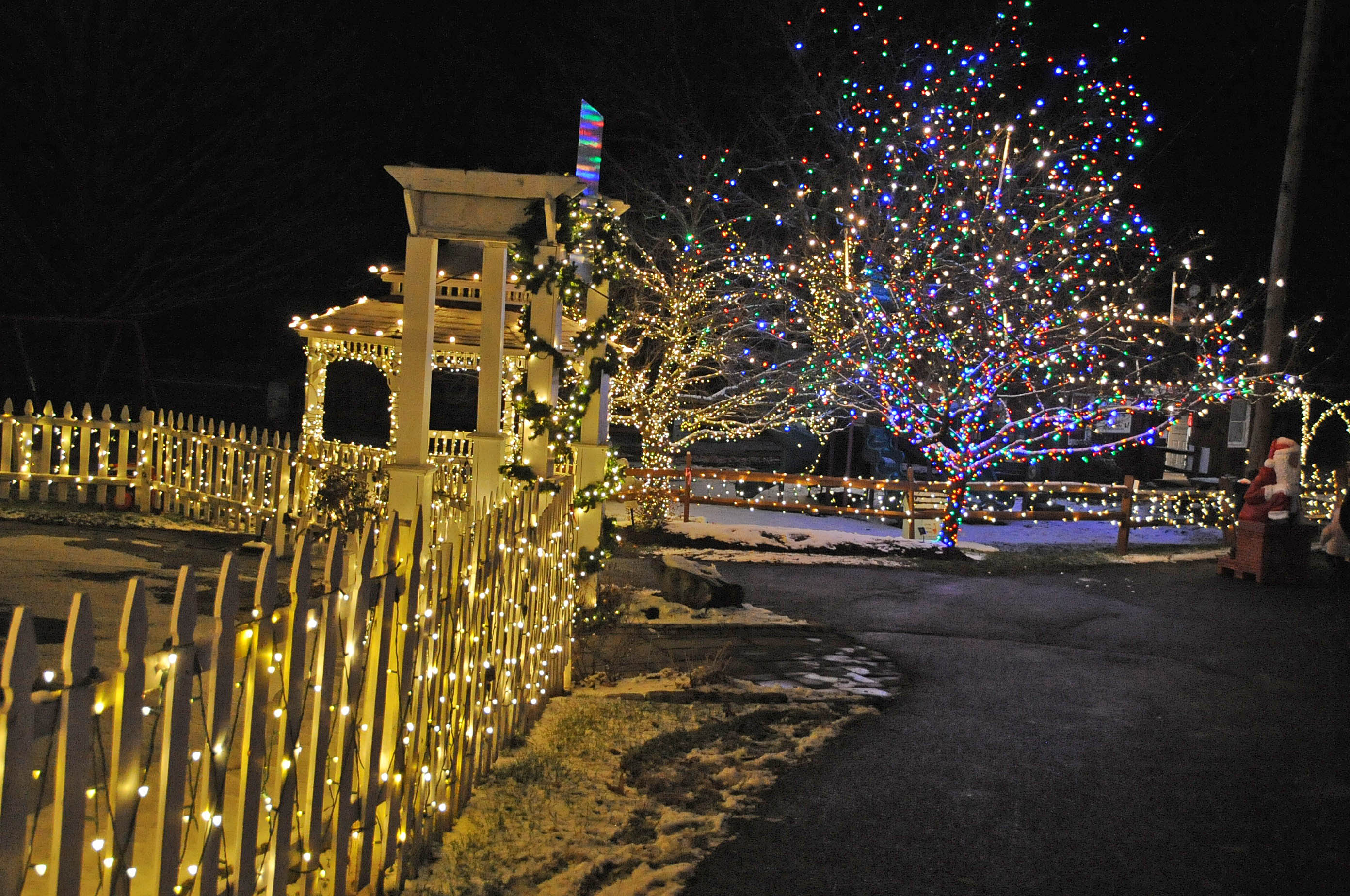
Christmas lights at Lehigh Valley Zoo in Schnecksville in December 2020

The Lehigh Valley has three principal cities: Allentown, Bethlehem, and Easton. The region is located between two of the nation's largest population centers, 90 miles (140 km) west of New York City, the nation's largest and world's 11th-largest city, and 60 miles (97 km) north of Philadelphia, the nation's sixth-largest and world's 68th-largest city. The region borders Carbon County and the Coal Region to its north, the Delaware River and Warren County, New Jersey to its east, Bucks and Montgomery Counties in suburban Philadelphia to its south, and Berks and Schuylkill Counties to its west.

=== Cities ===
- Allentown (125,845)
- Bethlehem (75,781)
- Easton (28,127)

=== Municipalities with more than 10,000 people ===
- Bethlehem Township (25,861)
- Emmaus (11,652)
- Forks Township (16,077)
- Hanover Township (Northampton) (11,785)
- Lehigh Township (10,773)
- Lower Macungie Township (32,426)
- Lower Saucon Township (10,772)
- Northampton (10,395)
- North Whitehall Township (15,655)
- Palmer Township (22,317)
- Salisbury Township (13,621)
- South Whitehall Township (19,180)
- Upper Macungie Township (26,377)
- Upper Saucon Township (16,973)
- Whitehall Township (26,738)

=== Municipalities with populations between 5,000 and 10,000 ===
- Ancient Oaks
- Allen Township
- Bangor
- Breinigsville
- Bushkill Township
- Catasauqua
- Chestnut Hill
- Hellertown
- Lower Nazareth Township
- Moore Township
- Nazareth
- Plainfield Township
- Upper Milford Township
- Upper Mount Bethel Township
- Upper Nazareth Township
- Washington Township (Lehigh)
- Washington Township (Northampton)
- Williams Township
- Wilson

=== Municipalities with fewer than 5,000 people ===
- Alburtis
- Bath
- Chapman
- Coopersburg
- Coplay
- East Allen Township
- East Bangor
- Fountain Hill
- Freemansburg
- Glendon
- Hanover Township (Lehigh)
- Heidelberg Township
- Lower Milford Township
- Lower Mount Bethel Township
- Lowhill Township
- Lynn Township
- Macungie
- North Catasauqua
- Pen Argyl
- Portland
- Roseto
- Slatington
- Stockertown
- Tatamy
- Walnutport
- Weisenberg Township
- West Easton
- Wind Gap

=== Census-designated places and villages ===
- Ackermanville
- Balliettsville
- Beersville
- Belfast
- Berlinsville
- Best Station
- Butztown
- Cementon
- Center Valley
- Cetronia
- Cherryville
- Chickentown
- Christian Springs
- Colesville
- Danielsville
- DeSales University
- Dorneyville
- Eagle Point
- Eastlawn Gardens
- East Texas
- Egypt
- Emanuelsville
- Emerald
- Flicksville
- Fogelsville
- Franks Corner
- Friedensville
- Fullerton
- Gauff Hill
- Germansville
- Hanoverville
- Hensingersville
- Hokendauqua
- Hollo
- Hosensack
- Ironton
- Jacksonville
- Katellen
- Klecknersville
- Kuhnsville
- Lanark
- Laurys Station
- Limeport
- Locust Valley
- Lynnport
- Martin's Creek
- Mickleys
- Middletown
- Moorestown
- Morgan Hill
- Mount Bethel
- Neffs
- Newburg
- New Smithville
- New Tripoli
- Old Orchard
- Old Zionsville
- Orefield
- Palmer Heights
- Pleasant Corners
- Powder Valley
- Raubsville
- Scherersville
- Schnecksville
- Schoenersville
- Seidersville
- Shimerville
- Sigmund
- Slatedale
- Slateford
- Stiles
- Summit Lawn
- Trexlertown
- Treichlers
- Vera Cruz
- Walbert
- Wanamakers
- Wassergass
- Werleys Corner
- Wescosville
- West Catasauqua
- Zionsville
- Zucksville

== Metropolitan and Combined Statistical Areas ==
Allentown–Bethlehem–Easton, PA–NJ Metropolitan Statistical Area
- Metropolitan Statistical Area
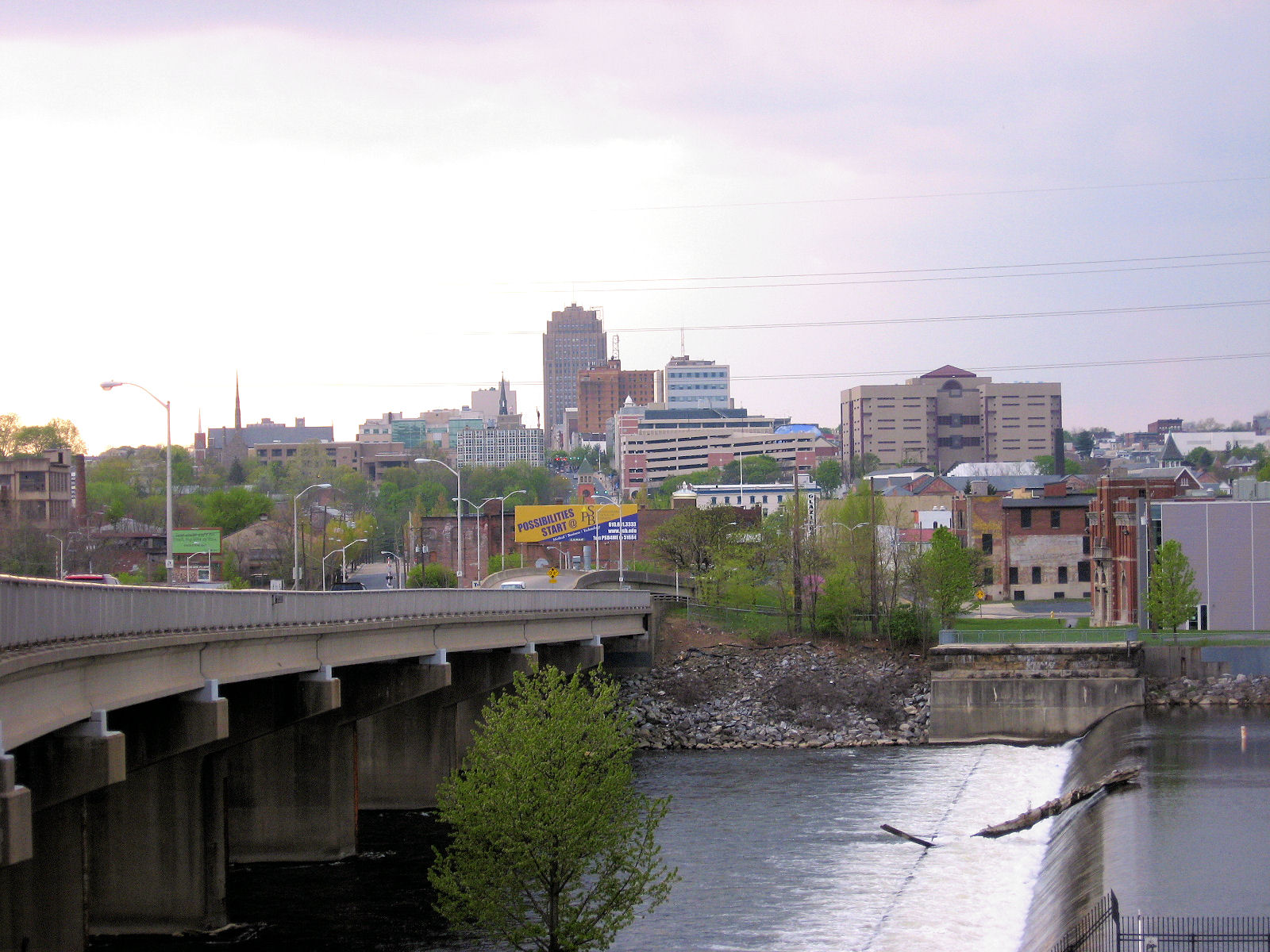
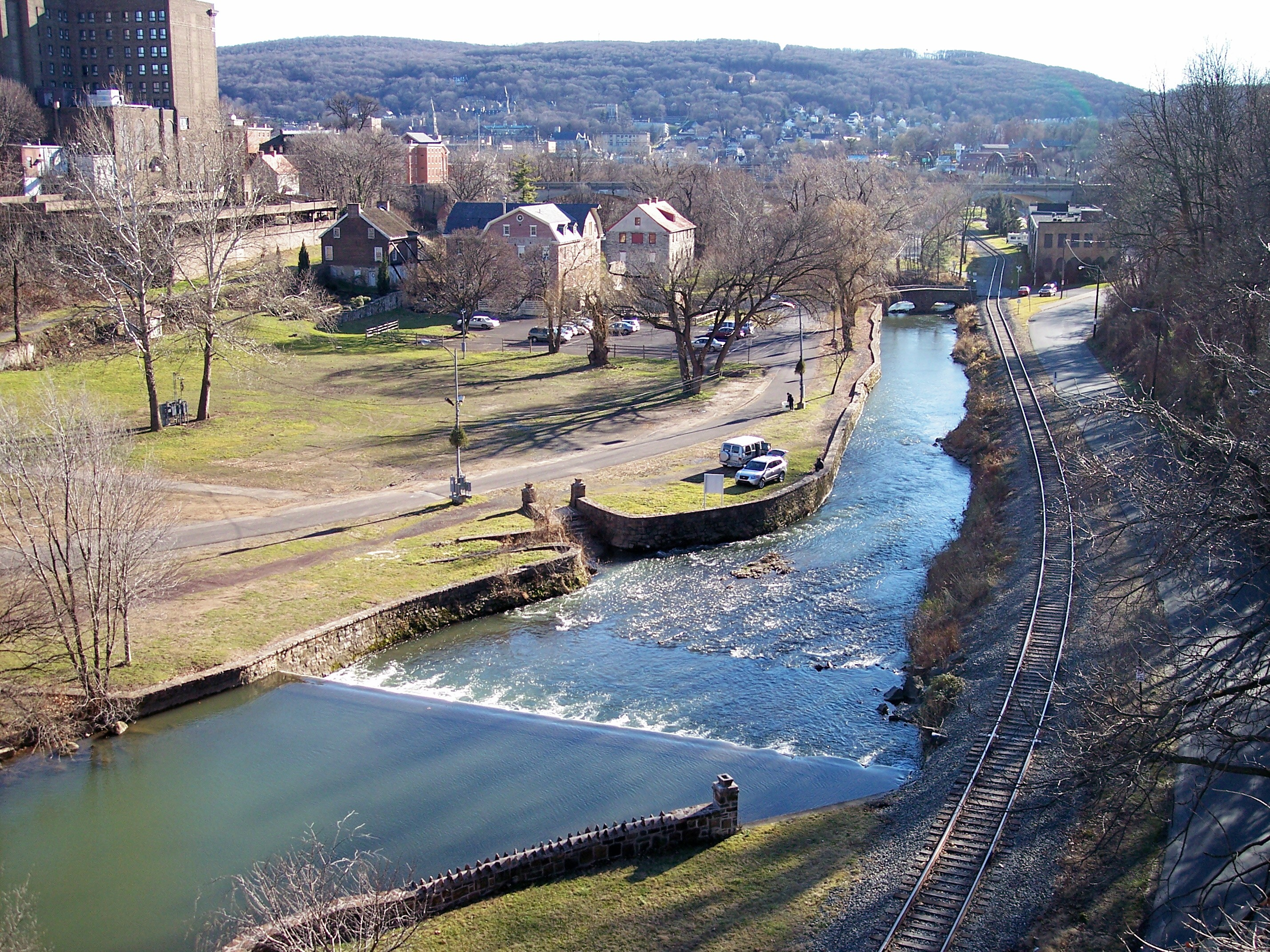
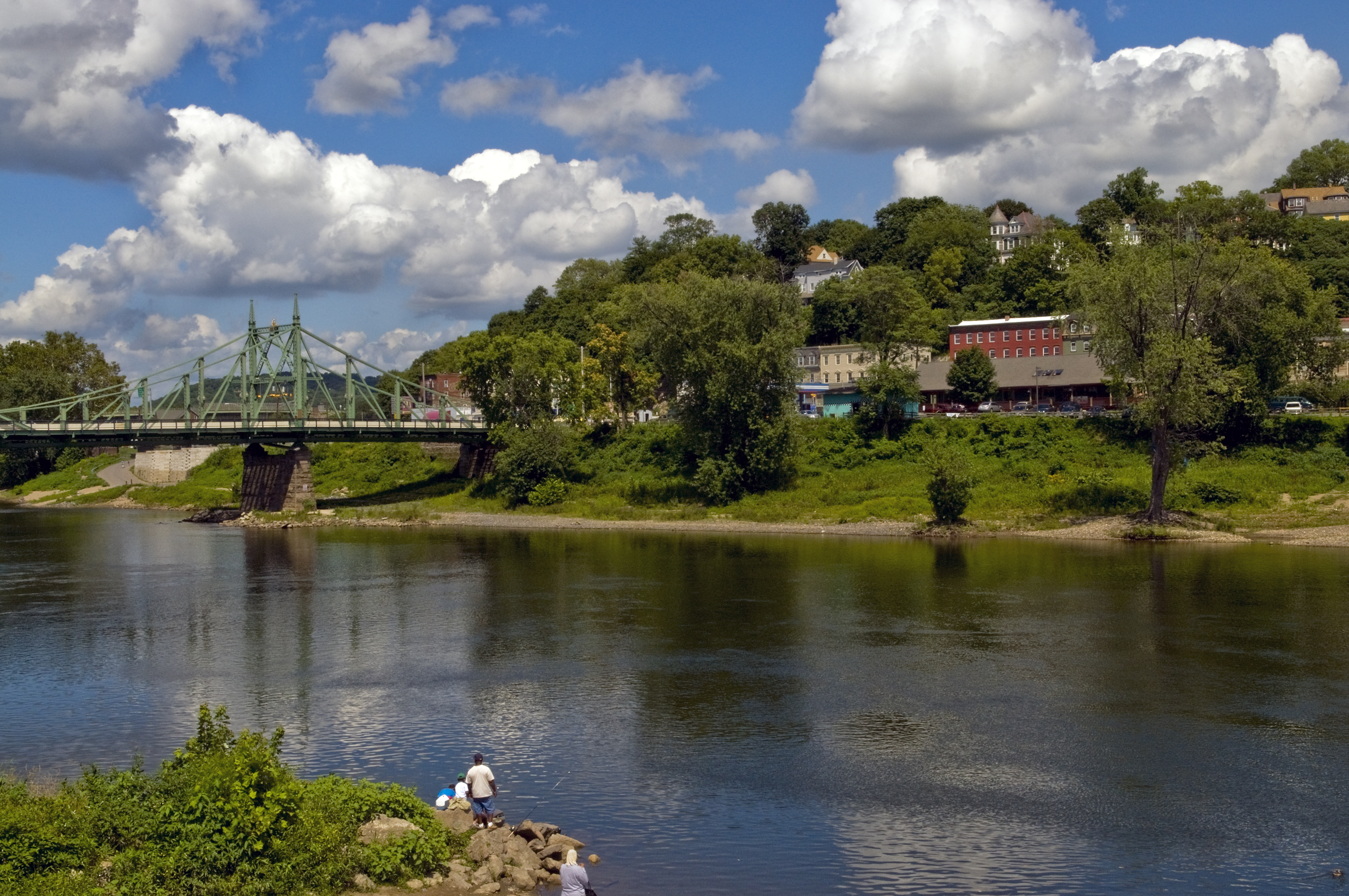
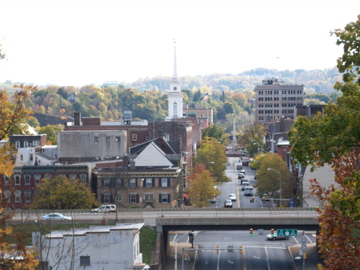
- Clockwise from top left: Allentown, Bethlehem, Easton, and Phillipsburg, NJ

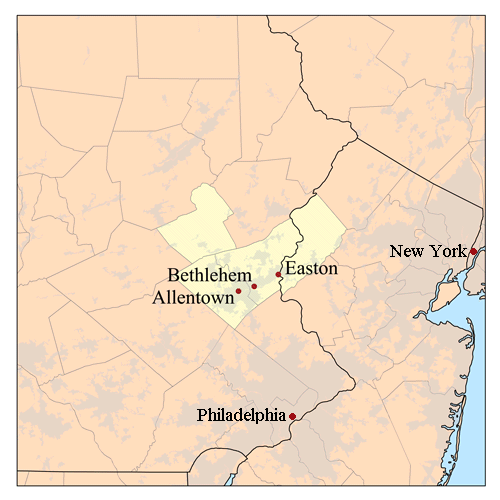
- Map of the Allentown-Bethlehem-Easton, PA-NJ Metro Area
- Country: United States
- States: Pennsylvania; New Jersey
- Principal cities: Allentown; Bethlehem; Easton
- Rank: 68th

Area
  - Total: 1,453 sq mi (3,760 km^{2})

Population (2020 U.S. Census)
  - Total: 861,889
  - Density: 593.2/sq mi (229.0/km^{2})
- Time zone: UTC−5 (ET)
  - Summer (DST): UTC−4 (EDT)
- Area codes: 484 and 610

The Allentown-Bethlehem-Easton, PA-NJ Metropolitan Statistical Area is a Metropolitan Statistical Area that includes Carbon County in the Coal Region, Lehigh and Northampton counties in the Lehigh Valley, and Warren County in the Skylands region of northwest New Jersey. As of 2023 census estimates, it is the 67th-largest metropolitan area in the nation with a population of 873,555.

In July 2023, the area was added to the newly created Allentown-Bethlehem-East Stroudsburg PA-NJ Combined Statistical Area (CSA). This area also includes Monroe County in the Pocono Mountains region of Pennsylvania. As of the 2020 census, the Allentown-Bethlehem-East Stroudsburg, PA-NJ CSA had a population of 1,030,216, the 59th-largest CSA in the nation.

== Climate ==
The Lehigh Valley has four distinct seasons, which typically include hot and humid summers, cold winters, and short and mild springs and falls. It has a humid continental climate (Dfa/Dfb) and the hardiness zone ranges from 5b in higher elevation locations in northern Carbon County to 6b, the principal zone in Lehigh, Northampton, and southern Warren Counties. The 1991-2020 hardiness zone for Lehigh Valley International Airport and lower elevations is 7a.

Climate data for Allentown, Pennsylvania at Lehigh Valley International Airport, 1991–2020 normals, (Note: Mean monthly maxima and minima (i.e. the highest and lowest temperature readings during an entire month or year) calculated based on data at said location from 1981 to 2010.) extremes 1922–present (Note: Official records for Allentown were kept at Allentown Gas Company from March 1922 to December 1943, and at Lehigh Valley Int'l since January 1944. For more information, see ThreadEx.)
Month	Jan	Feb	Mar	Apr	May	Jun	Jul	Aug	Sep	Oct	Nov	Dec	Year
Record high °F (°C)	72 (22)	81 (27)	87 (31)	93 (34)	97 (36)	100 (38)	105 (41)	100 (38)	99 (37)	93 (34)	81 (27)	72 (22)	105 (41)
Mean maximum °F (°C)	60.2 (15.7)	60.6 (15.9)	70.6 (21.4)	83.2 (28.4)	89.3 (31.8)	92.6 (33.7)	94.8 (34.9)	92.8 (33.8)	89.2 (31.8)	80.4 (26.9)	70.9 (21.6)	61.7 (16.5)	95.9 (35.5)
Mean daily maximum °F (°C)	38.4 (3.6)	41.6 (5.3)	50.8 (10.4)	63.4 (17.4)	73.5 (23.1)	81.9 (27.7)	86.4 (30.2)	84.3 (29.1)	77.4 (25.2)	65.5 (18.6)	53.8 (12.1)	43.1 (6.2)	63.3 (17.4)
Daily mean °F (°C)	30.1 (−1.1)	32.4 (0.2)	40.7 (4.8)	51.8 (11.0)	62.0 (16.7)	70.9 (21.6)	75.6 (24.2)	73.6 (23.1)	66.3 (19.1)	54.6 (12.6)	43.9 (6.6)	35.0 (1.7)	53.1 (11.7)
Mean daily minimum °F (°C)	21.8 (−5.7)	23.2 (−4.9)	30.5 (−0.8)	40.3 (4.6)	50.6 (10.3)	59.9 (15.5)	64.7 (18.2)	62.8 (17.1)	55.2 (12.9)	43.8 (6.6)	34.1 (1.2)	26.8 (−2.9)	42.8 (6.0)
Mean minimum °F (°C)	4.2 (−15.4)	5.9 (−14.5)	14.1 (−9.9)	25.9 (−3.4)	35.3 (1.8)	46.5 (8.1)	53.7 (12.1)	51.1 (10.6)	39.9 (4.4)	28.7 (−1.8)	19.1 (−7.2)	11.7 (−11.3)	1.8 (−16.8)
Record low °F (°C)	−15 (−26)	−12 (−24)	−5 (−21)	12 (−11)	28 (−2)	39 (4)	46 (8)	41 (5)	30 (−1)	21 (−6)	3 (−16)	−8 (−22)	−15 (−26)
Average precipitation inches (mm)	3.30 (84)	2.77 (70)	3.63 (92)	3.67 (93)	3.65 (93)	4.40 (112)	5.30 (135)	4.56 (116)	4.84 (123)	4.14 (105)	3.24 (82)	3.86 (98)	47.36 (1,203)
Average snowfall inches (cm)	9.8 (25)	10.8 (27)	6.3 (16)	0.5 (1.3)	0.0 (0.0)	0.0 (0.0)	0.0 (0.0)	0.0 (0.0)	0.0 (0.0)	0.2 (0.51)	0.9 (2.3)	4.6 (12)	33.1 (84)
Average extreme snow depth inches (cm)	6.4 (16)	7.9 (20)	4.9 (12)	0.3 (0.76)	0.0 (0.0)	0.0 (0.0)	0.0 (0.0)	0.0 (0.0)	0.0 (0.0)	0.2 (0.51)	0.6 (1.5)	2.9 (7.4)	12.4 (31)
Average precipitation days (≥ 0.01 in)	11.4	10.1	10.9	11.8	12.4	11.4	11.0	10.2	9.6	9.9	8.9	11.5	129.1
Average snowy days (≥ 0.1 in)	5.1	4.3	2.6	0.3	0.0	0.0	0.0	0.0	0.0	0.0	0.5	2.9	15.7
Average relative humidity (%)	70	66	62	61	66	68	70	72	74	72	70	71	69
Percentage possible sunshine	43	48	53	47	54	63	57	56	54	53	45	42	51
Source: NOAA (relative humidity 1981–2010)

== Demographics ==
Historical population
Census	Pop.	Note	%±
1900	231,341		—
1910	289,686		25.2%
1920	346,664		19.7%
1930	391,516		12.9%
1940	396,673		1.3%
1950	437,824		10.4%
1960	545,057		24.5%
1970	594,124		9.0%
1980	635,481		7.0%
1990	686,688		8.1%
2000	740,395		7.8%
2010	821,623		11.0%
2020	861,889		4.9%

The Lehigh Valley has a total population of 861,889 residents as of the 2020 U.S. census, making it the third-largest metropolitan area in Pennsylvania and 68th-largest metropolitan area in the nation.

A 2018 American Community Survey conducted by the U.S. Census Bureau found that 87.1% of the Lehigh Valley's population was White American, 4.6% was Black or African American, 0.1% was American Indian, 2.3% was Asian American, 0.1% was Native Hawaiian, 0.1% were Pacific Islander Americans, 4.3% were of some other race, and 1.5% belonged to two or more races. Hispanics and Latinos of any race made up 11.3% of the population and represent the Lehigh Valley's fastest-growing demographic. Lehigh County is in the top 1% of all U.S. counties for inward migration from international locations, according to Select USA, a U.S. Department of Commerce program. The Lehigh Valley leads Pennsylvania in terms of population growth in the 18-to-34 year old demographic, according to 2020 census data.

The Lehigh Valley's population growth is partly a result of a growing influx of residents from New Jersey and New York drawn to the Lehigh Valley's lower cost of living, its employment opportunities, and its close proximity to Philadelphia and New York City, the nation's sixth and largest cities, respectively. The Valley's population is expected to increase by 227,000 people by 2040, making it one of the fastest-growing areas in the state and nation.

County	2025 Estimate	2020 Census	Change	Area	Density
Lehigh County, PA	384,383	374,557	+2.62%	345 sq mi (890 km^{2})	1,114/sq mi (430/km^{2})
Northampton County, PA	324,411	312,951	+3.66%	370 sq mi (960 km^{2})	877/sq mi (339/km^{2})
Warren County, NJ	112,953	109,632	+3.03%	357 sq mi (920 km^{2})	316/sq mi (122/km^{2})
Carbon County, PA	65,868	64,749	+1.73%	381 sq mi (990 km^{2})	173/sq mi (67/km^{2})
Total MSA Population	887,615	861,889	+2.98%	1,452.92 sq mi (3,763.0 km^{2})	611/sq mi (236/km^{2})

Median household income for the region increased from $57,288 to $81,709 between 2015 and 2024.

== Economy ==
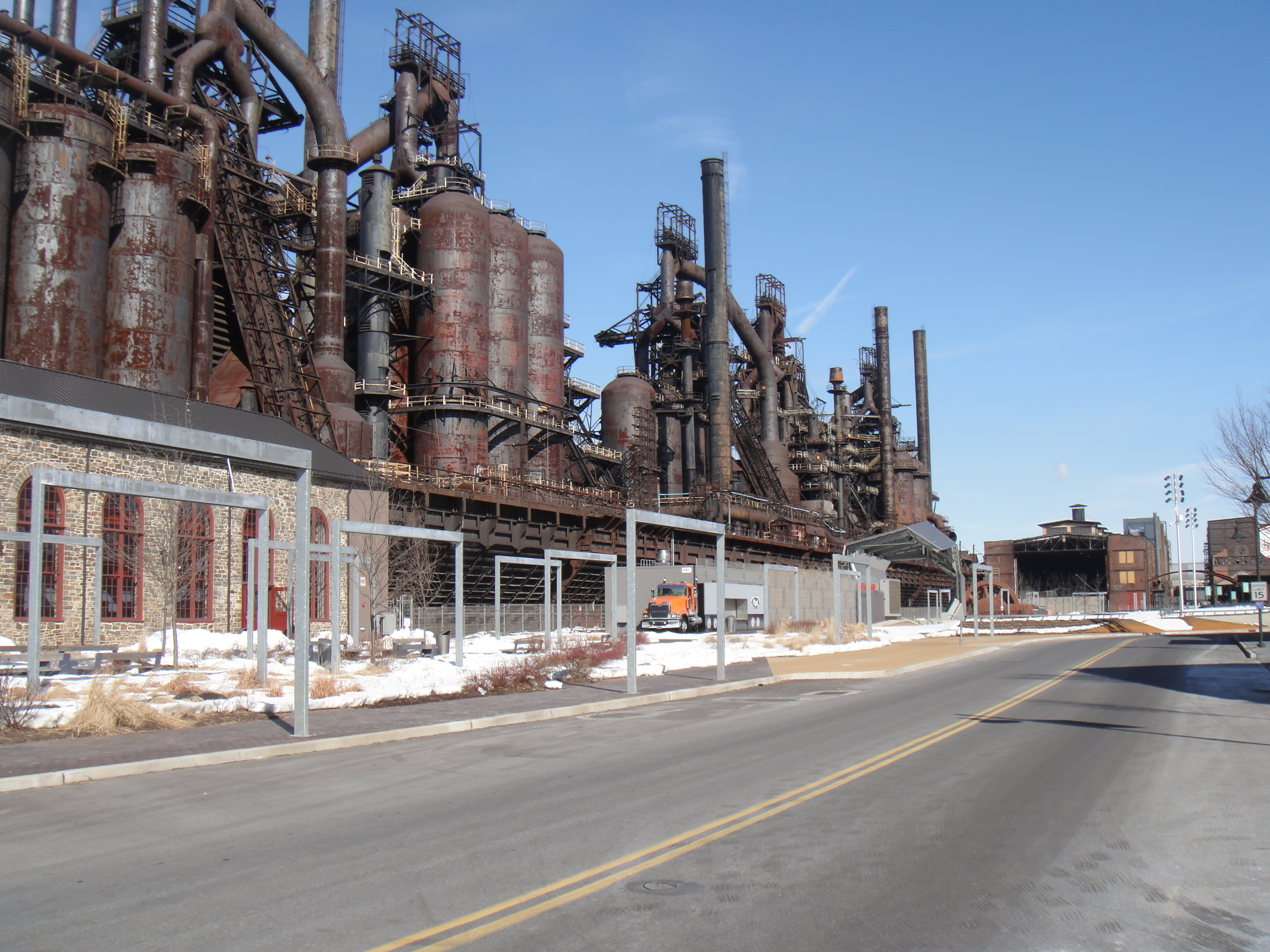
The now dormant but still standing steel stacks of Bethlehem Steel in Bethlehem, once the second-largest steel manufacturer in the world. The company ceased most of its operations in 1982, declared bankruptcy in 2001, and was dissolved in 2003.

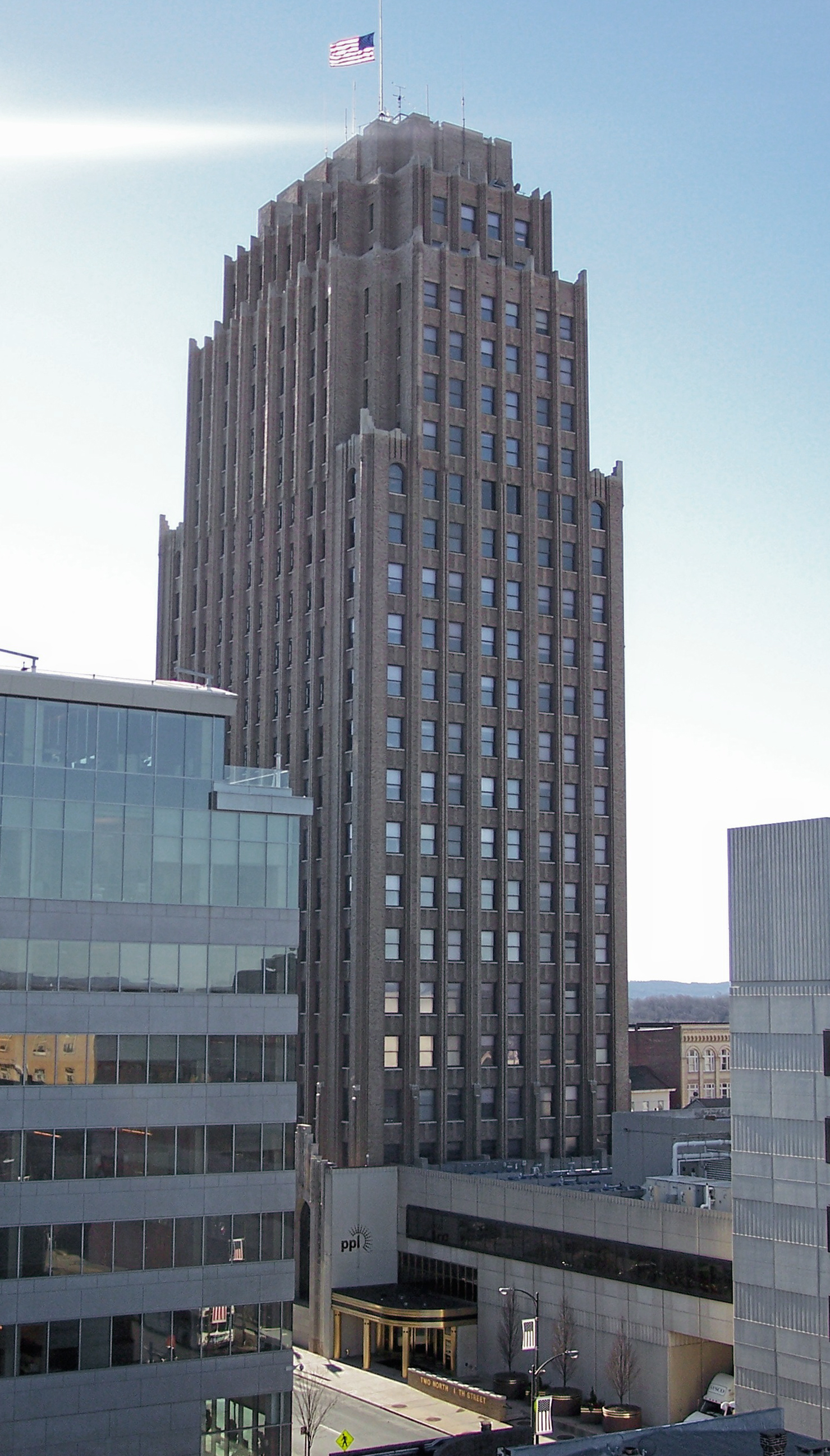
The Lehigh Valley's tallest building, the 24-story PPL Building in Allentown

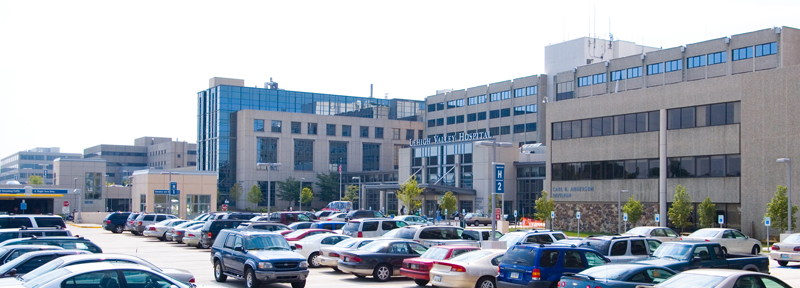
Lehigh Valley Hospital–Cedar Crest on Cedar Crest Boulevard in Allentown, the largest current employer in the Lehigh Valley and third-largest hospital in Pennsylvania with 877 beds and 46 operating rooms

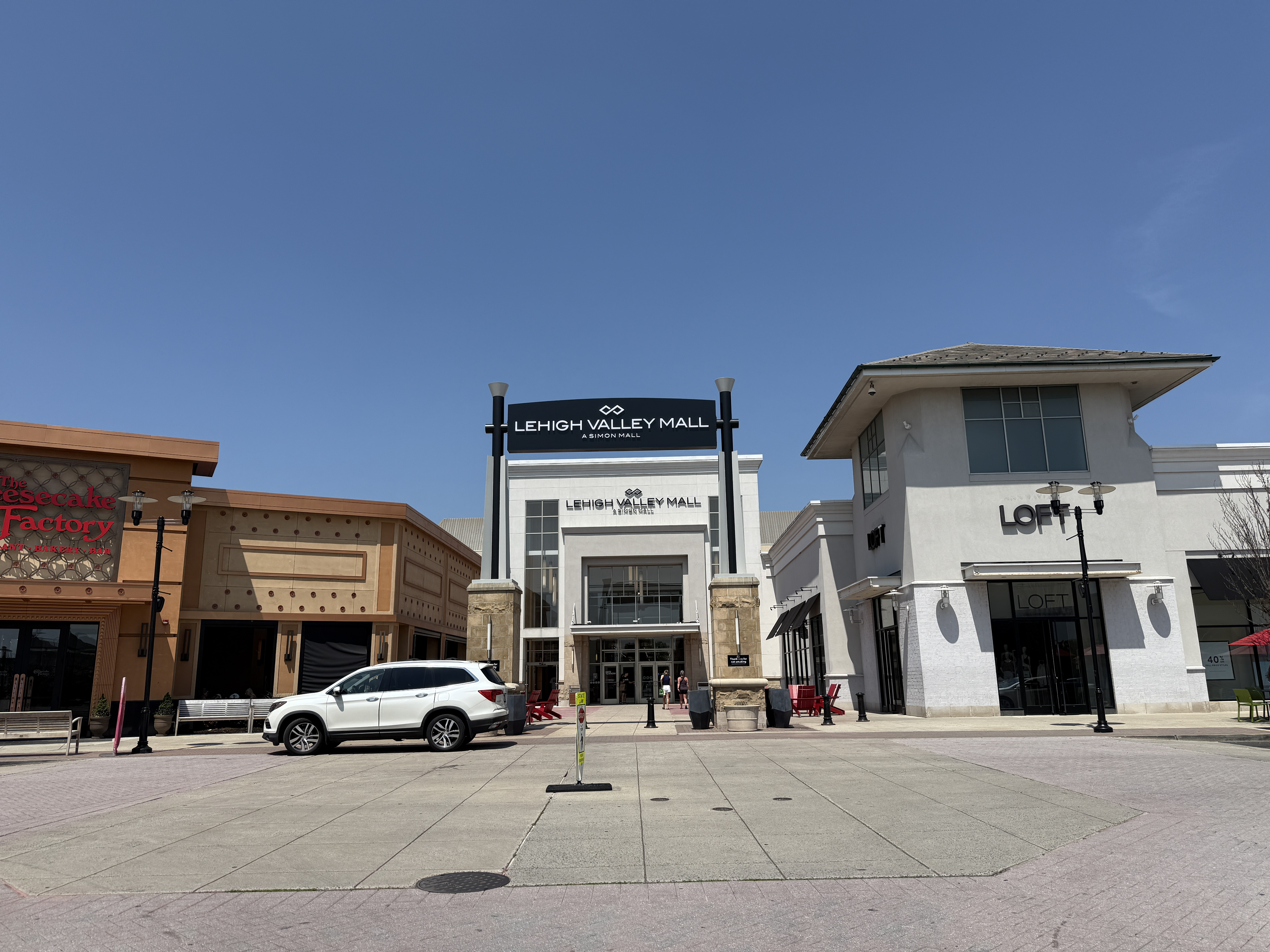
Lehigh Valley Mall in Whitehall Township, the Lehigh Valley's largest indoor shopping mall with 146 stores

The Lehigh Valley's economy had been known historically and globally for its leadership throughout the 19th and 20th centuries in heavy manufacturing. Beginning in the 1980s, however, the region's manufacturing sector declined rapidly as a result of foreign competition, trade practices, operational costs, regulations, and other factors. The most prominent example was Bethlehem Steel, the world's second-largest manufacturer of steel for much of the 20th century. Headquartered in Bethlehem, Bethlehem Steel abruptly suspended most of its operations in the early 1980s, declared bankruptcy in 2001, and was dissolved in 2003.

Since the late 20th century, the Lehigh Valley's economy has diversified following the decline of its steel and manufacturing industries. Growth in other sectors has contributed to the region's economic redevelopment. Site Selection magazine has consistently ranked the Lehigh Valley among the top-performing mid-sized markets in the United States, including a first-place ranking in 2023.

As of 2020, the Valley's top five industries were finance, manufacturing, health care and education, professional and business services, and information. Other major industry sectors in the area include transportation, retail trade, and restaurants and hospitality. In 2023, the Lehigh Valley's total gross domestic product was $55.7 billion. The Lehigh Valley has a workforce of over 365,900 people residing within the region, and over 1.7M people residing within a one-hour commute of the region as of 2023.

=== Largest employers ===
As of 2024, the Lehigh Valley's five top private sector employers are: 1.) Lehigh Valley Health Network (headquartered in Allentown); 2.) St. Luke's Hospital and Health Network (headquartered in Fountain Hill); 3.) Amazon (with a 1,100,000 ft (335,280.0 m) square foot facility in Palmer Township); 4.) Mack Trucks (with manufacturing headquarters in Macungie); and 5.) Air Products (globally headquartered in Trexlertown).

=== Business and economic environment ===
The Lehigh Valley is one of the fastest-growing and largest economies in Pennsylvania and the United States with a total GDP of $55.7 billion (as of 2023) that saw a four percent increase between 2022 and 2023 alone driven by strong manufacturing, financial, health care, and professional services industry segments. It was named in March 2024 as the top mid-sized market in America by Site Selection Magazine for economic development based on the number of projects that met certain criteria for job creation, investment and size in 2023.

It is centrally located in the Northeast megalopolis with ease of access and close proximity to several of the largest U.S. markets, population centers, airports, terminals, railways, and seaports, including the New York City and Philadelphia metropolitan areas. The Lehigh Valley is within a one-day drive to over a third of the U.S. population and to over half the population of Canada. The Valley has a lower cost of living, more affordable real estate, lower taxes, and a larger and more affordable labor pool than many other Northeastern U.S. metropolitan regions. These attributes and others, including sizable investments in business development incentive programs and a friendlier regulatory environment, provide the area with a comparatively favorable business climate compared to surrounding metropolitan areas.

Due in large part to this comparably favorable business climate and mature business support programs, the Lehigh Valley has been successful in luring established businesses as well as new startup companies from higher cost areas such as New York and New Jersey, generating thousands of jobs and significant new investments in the region. Large companies such as Amazon.com have praised the Lehigh Valley for its commitment to business support, infrastructure investment, and incentive programs, citing these as major reasons for their continuing expansions and increased hiring in the region and Allegiant Air, a low-cost budget airline, opened a new flight base at the Lehigh Valley International Airport in February 2020, noting the area's rapid growth, lower operational business costs, and its proximity to popular destinations as significant reasons for expanding their Lehigh Valley International Airport flights.

Other large national and international companies either based in the Lehigh Valley or with significant operations there include Broadcom Corporation (in Allentown), Avantor Performance Materials (in Allentown), Air Products (in Trexlertown), Crayola (in Easton), Buckeye Partners (in Emmaus), HeidelbergCement (in Fogelsville), Just Born (in Bethlehem, maker of Peeps candies), Mack Trucks (in Allentown), Martin Guitar (in Nazareth), Olympus Corporation (in Center Valley), OraSure Technologies (in Bethlehem), PPL Corporation (in Allentown), Wind Creek Bethlehem (in Bethlehem), Dun & Bradstreet (in Center Valley), Victaulic (in Easton), and others.

In 2014, 2017, 2018, and 2019, the Lehigh Valley was recognized by Site Selection magazine as the second-best performing region of its size for economic development in the nation and the best performing region in the Northeast U.S.. It was ranked by Fortune in 2015 as one of the top 10 best places in the U.S. to locate corporate finance and information technology operations, including call and IT support centers. Allentown, the Lehigh Valley's largest city, was cited as a "national success story" in April 2016 by the Urban Land Institute for its downtown redevelopment and transformation that has led to $1 billion worth of new development projects there between 2015 and 2019, one of only six communities nationally to achieve this distinction.

The Lehigh Valley is one of the leading areas on the East Coast for warehouses and distribution centers. Because of this, it is sometimes referred to as the nation's "second Inland Empire" for freight. Large national companies that own and operate warehouses and distribution centers in the Lehigh Valley include Amazon.com, B. Braun, Boston Beer Company (brewer of Samuel Adams brand beer), BMW, Bridgestone, FedEx SmartPost, FedEx Ground, Home Depot, J. C. Penney, Nestlé Purina, ShopRite, Stitch Fix, The Coca-Cola Company, Ocean Spray, Phillips Pet Food and Supplies, True Value, Uline, Zulily, and others. Most of these warehouses and distribution centers are located along the Valley's southern U.S. Route 22, Interstate 78, and Interstate 476 corridors, which provide direct access to numerous major markets throughout the Northeast U.S. and beyond.

In September 2018, FedEx Ground constructed their largest distribution hub in the country near Lehigh Valley International Airport at a cost of $335 million. This hub can process up to 45,000 packages per hour and employs over 2,000 people. By 2030, it is expected to have a total size of 1,100,000 square feet (100,000 m^{2}) square feet and employ over 3,000 people.

The Boston Beer Company operates its largest U.S. production brewery facility in Breinigsville in the Lehigh Valley, which produces over 2/3rds of all Samuel Adams beer globally. The company continues to upgrade and expand operations at this facility and has cited the location as central to its overall corporate success. Additionally, Ocean Spray, a popular maker of juice drinks and other fruit products, produces 40 percent of its total national beverage volume at its Lehigh Valley plant in Breinigsville. Due to Pennsylvania's lack of an excise tax on cigars and the Lehigh Valley's close proximity to major markets, the region is home to some of the nation's largest cigar distributors and retailers.

=== Retail shopping ===
The largest retail shopping area in the Lehigh Valley is the PA Route 145/MacArthur Road corridor, just north of Allentown in Whitehall Township, which is anchored by Lehigh Valley Mall and Whitehall Plaza.

Other Lehigh Valley malls include Palmer Park Mall in Easton and the South Mall in Salisbury Township. In October 2006, Promenade Saucon Valley, located off Route 309 in Upper Saucon Township in the Lehigh Valley, opened. Promenade is roughly half the size of the Lehigh Valley Mall but features higher end stores not available in Lehigh Valley Mall. In 2011, The Outlets at Wind Creek Bethlehem opened at Wind Creek Bethlehem in Bethlehem, becoming the Lehigh Valley's first outlet mall. The Westgate Mall in Bethlehem has been redeveloped into The Westgate shopping center.

== Media ==
=== Television ===
The Lehigh Valley is part of the Philadelphia television market, the nation's fourth-largest television market, and also receives television stations from the New York City and Scranton/Wilkes-Barre television markets. Lehigh Valley–based stations include WBPH-TV, a Christian television licensed to Bethlehem with studios in Allentown, WFMZ-TV, an independent commercial television station on South Mountain in Allentown, and WLVT-TV, the PBS station licensed to Allentown with studios in Bethlehem.

=== Radio ===
The Lehigh Valley is home to over 35 radio stations, including both English and Spanish-language stations and a range of formats, including all-news, sports radio, talk radio, and NPR. Lehigh Valley station music formats include Top 40, hip hop, rhythmic, country, oldies, polka, soft rock, classic rock, hard rock, and several campus radio stations.

=== Newspapers ===
Lehigh Valley–based daily newspapers include The Morning Call and The Express-Times, both of which have been media sources in the Lehigh Valley dating back to the mid-1800s, and NJ.com, an aggregation website that carries news articles from multiple Lehigh Valley and New Jersey–based newspapers.

Two magazines cover the region. Lehigh Valley Style is a regional lifestyle publication based in Easton. Lehigh Valley Magazine, based in Harrisburg, is the region's oldest lifestyle publication.

=== Film ===
Multiple movies have been fully or partially filmed in the Lehigh Valley, including M. Night Shyamalan's Glass in 2019, indie dark-comedy Getting Grace starring Daniel Roebuck, Taylor A. Purdee's folk rock musical Killian & the Comeback Kids, and others.

== Education ==
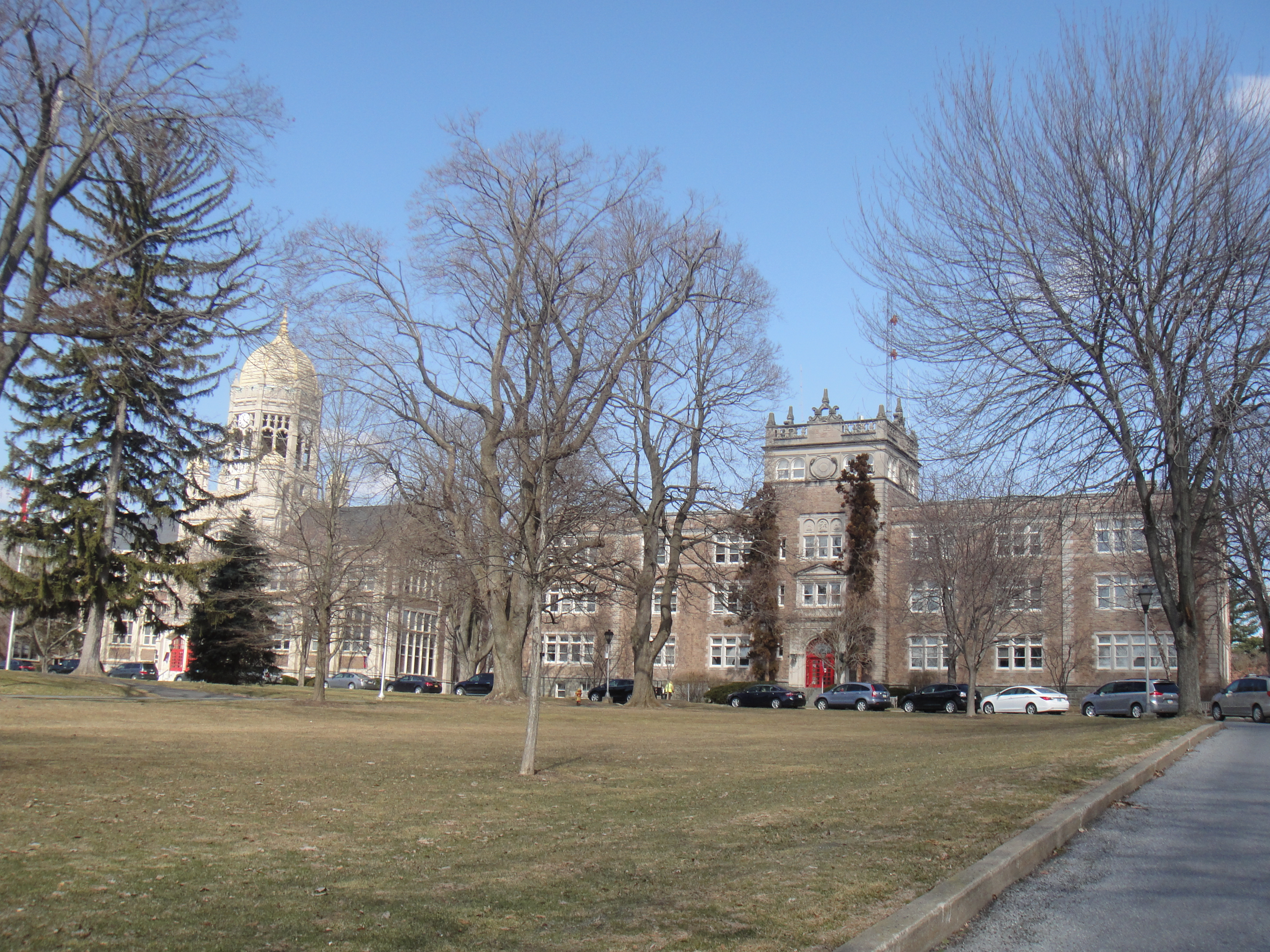
The campus of Muhlenberg College in Allentown in March 2014

=== Colleges and universities ===
Seven colleges and universities are based in the Lehigh Valley:

- Cedar Crest College (in Allentown)
- DeSales University (in Center Valley)
- Lafayette College (in Easton)
- Lehigh University (in Bethlehem)
- Moravian University (in Bethlehem)
- Muhlenberg College (in Allentown)
- Penn State Lehigh Valley (in Center Valley)

The Lehigh Valley has two community colleges:

- Lehigh Carbon Community College (with campuses in Allentown, Carbon County, and Schnecksville)
- Northampton Community College (with campuses in Bethlehem, Bethlehem Township, and Monroe County)

=== High schools ===
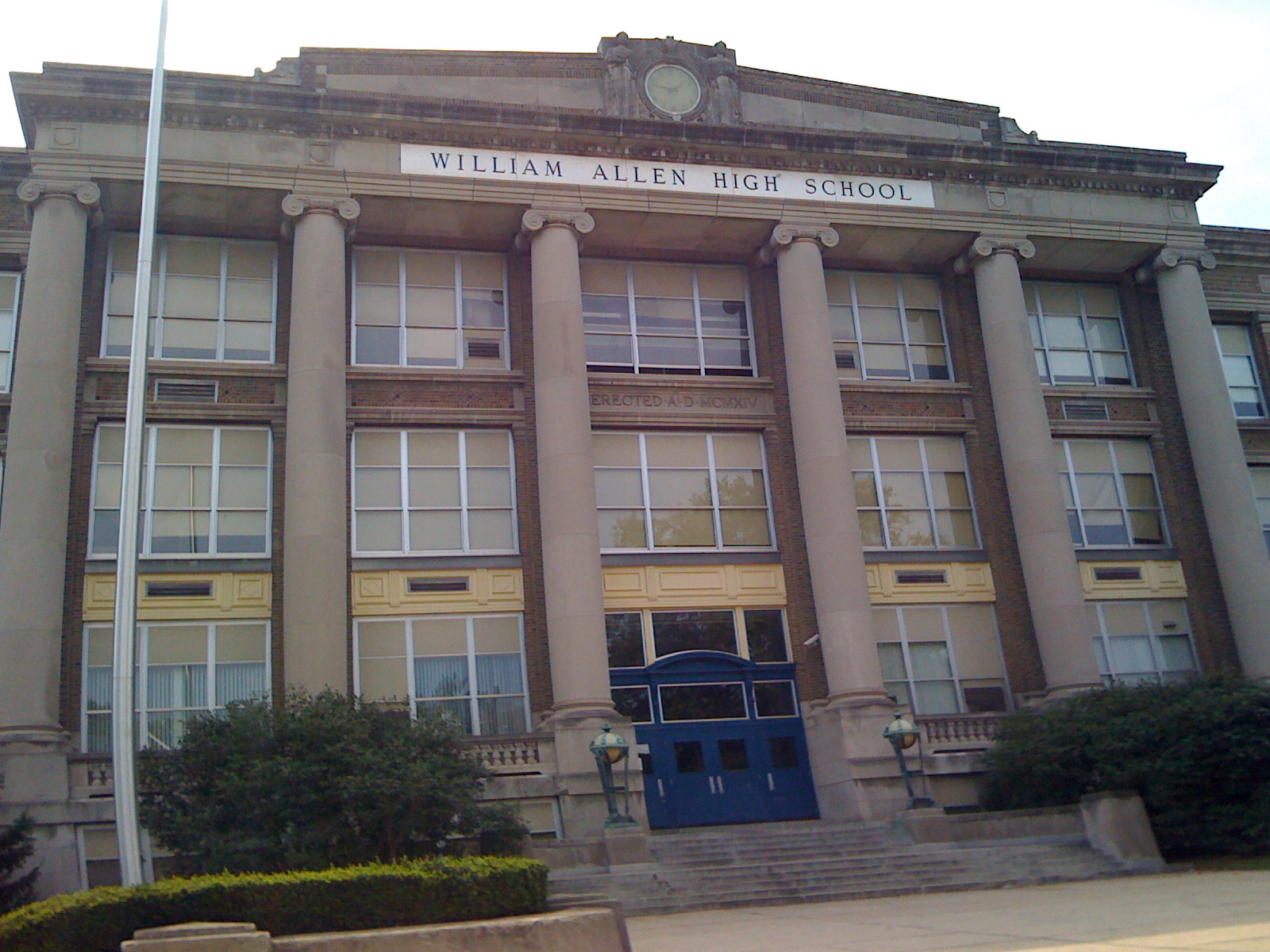
Allen High School, one of Allentown's two large public high schools in the Allentown School District, in July 2008

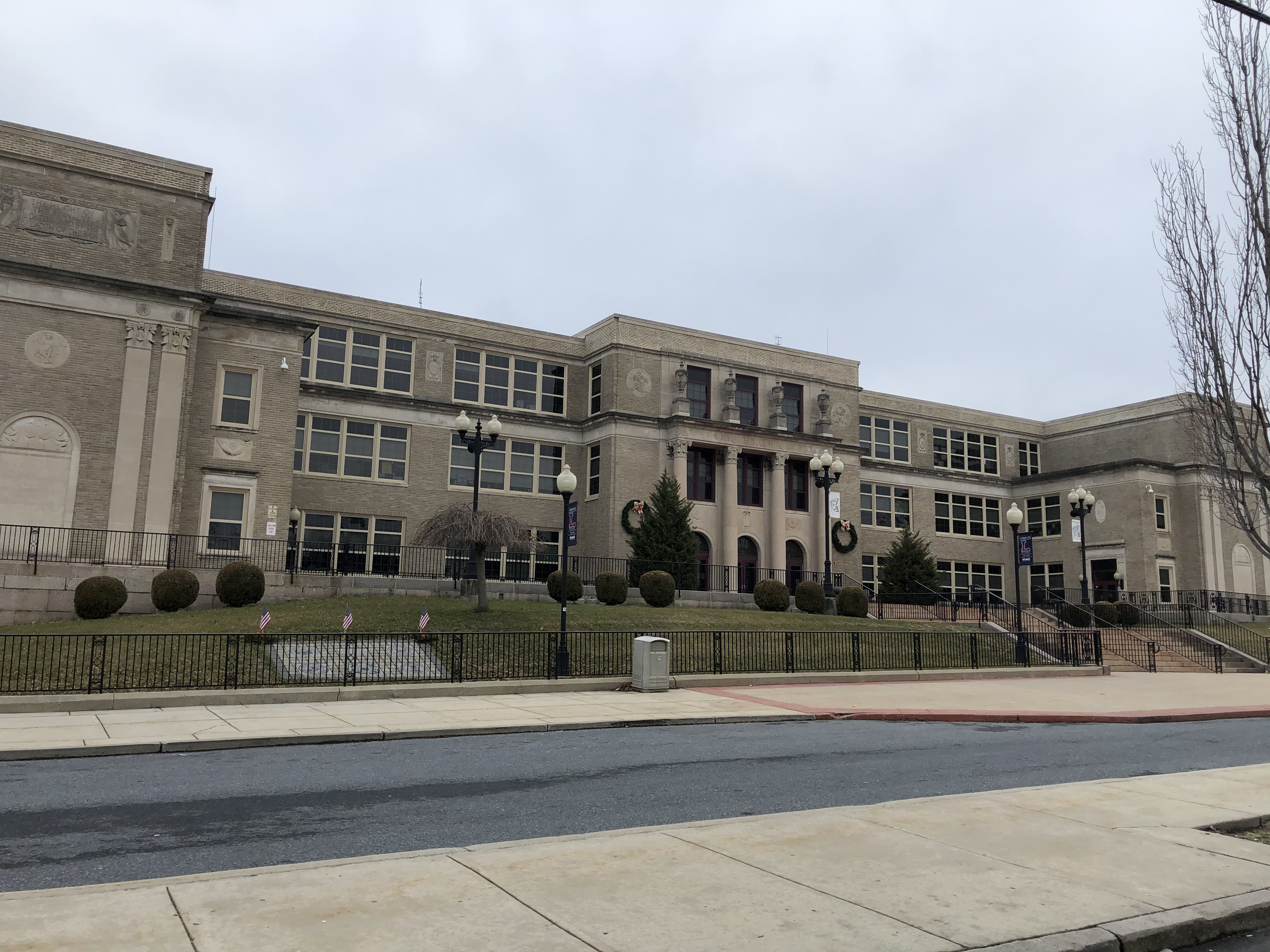
Liberty High School in Bethlehem, in February 2020

The Lehigh Valley is the third-most populous metropolitan region in Pennsylvania and served by several large school districts, public and private high schools, middle schools, and elementary schools, including:

- Allen High School (in Allentown)
- Allentown Central Catholic High School (in Allentown)
- Bangor Area High School (in Bangor)
- Bethlehem Area Vocational-Technical School (in Bethlehem)
- Bethlehem Catholic High School (in Bethlehem)
- Catasauqua High School (in Northampton)
- Dieruff High School (in Allentown)
- Easton Area High School (in Easton)
- Emmaus High School (in Emmaus)
- Executive Education Academy Charter School (in Allentown)
- Freedom High School (in Bethlehem Township)
- Lehigh Career and Technical Institute (in Schnecksville)
- Lehigh Valley Academy Regional Charter School (in Bethlehem)
- Lehigh Valley Charter High School for the Arts (in Bethlehem)
- Lehigh Valley Christian Academy (in Allentown)
- Liberty High School (in Bethlehem)
- Lincoln Leadership Academy Charter School (in Allentown)
- Moravian Academy (in Bethlehem)
- Nazareth Area High School (in Nazareth)
- Northampton Area High School (in Northampton)
- Northern Lehigh High School (in Slatington)
- Northwestern Lehigh High School (in New Tripoli)
- Notre Dame High School (in Easton)
- Parkland High School (in Allentown)
- Pen Argyl Area High School (in Pen Argyl)
- Roberto Clemente Charter School (in Allentown)
- Salisbury High School (in Salisbury Township)
- Salem Christian School (in Macungie)
- Saucon Valley High School (in Hellertown)
- Southern Lehigh High School (in Center Valley)
- Whitehall High School (in Whitehall Township)
- Wilson Area High School (in Easton)

The largest high schools in the Lehigh Valley and the Poconos (18 in all) compete athletically in the Eastern Pennsylvania Conference. Smaller Lehigh Valley high schools compete in the Colonial League.

== Sports ==
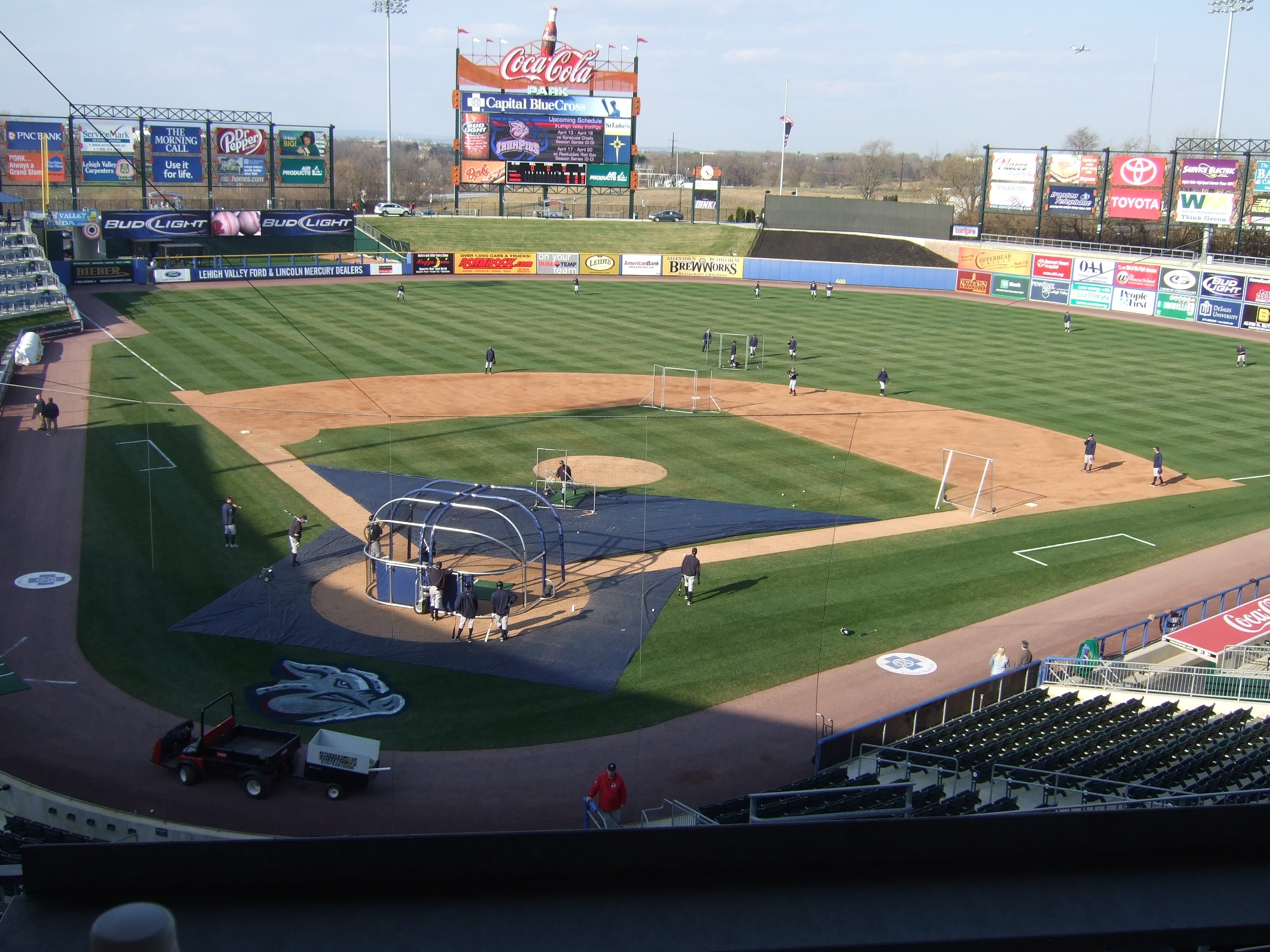
Coca-Cola Park in East Allentown, home field for the Lehigh Valley IronPigs, the Triple-A affiliate of the Philadelphia Phillies, in April 2009

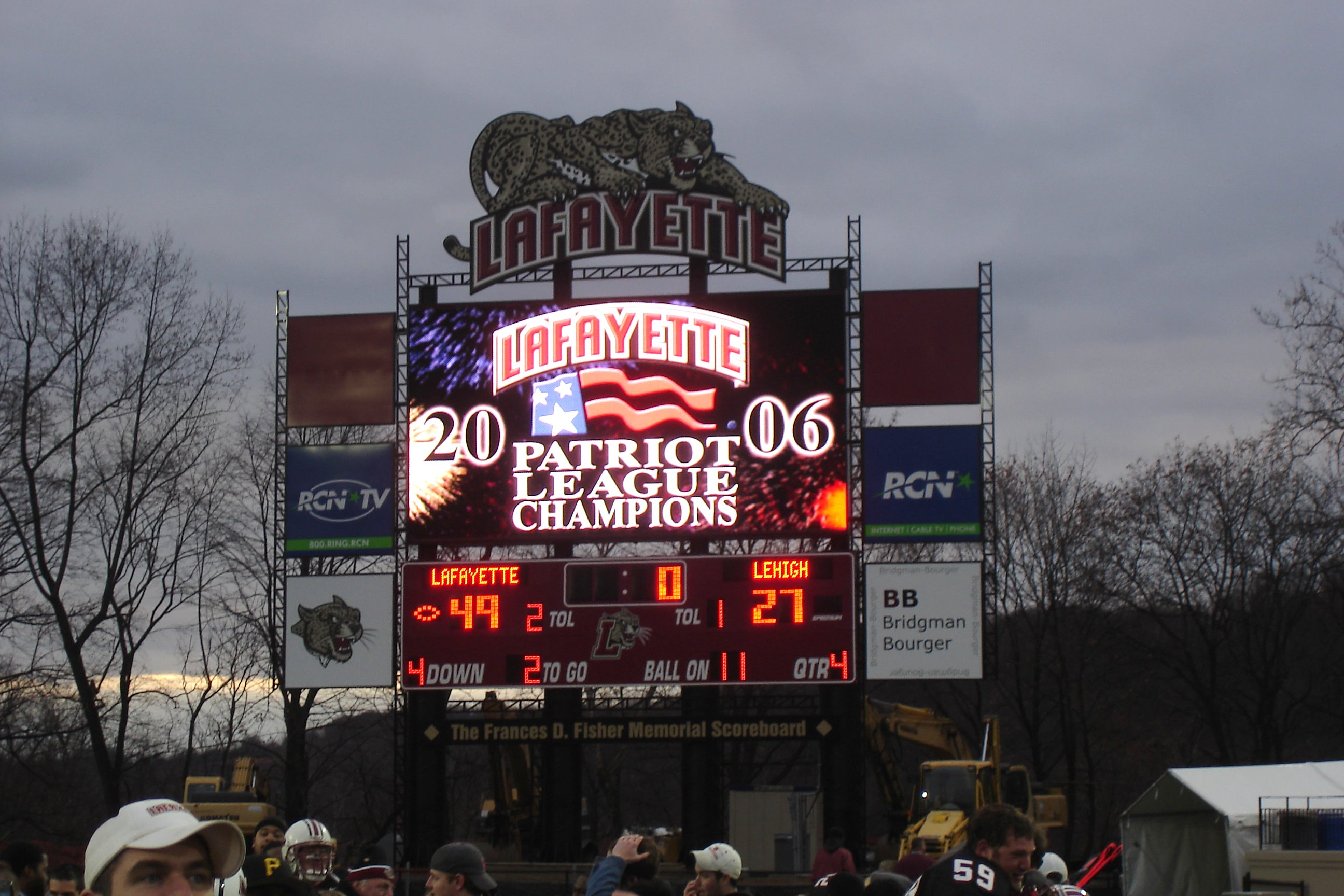
Fisher Stadium's scoreboard in Easton following Lafayette College's victory over Lehigh University in the 142nd edition of The Rivalry in 2006. The series between the two colleges, which are 17 miles (27 km) away from each other in the Lehigh Valley, is the most-played rivalry in college football history with 158 meetings since 1884.

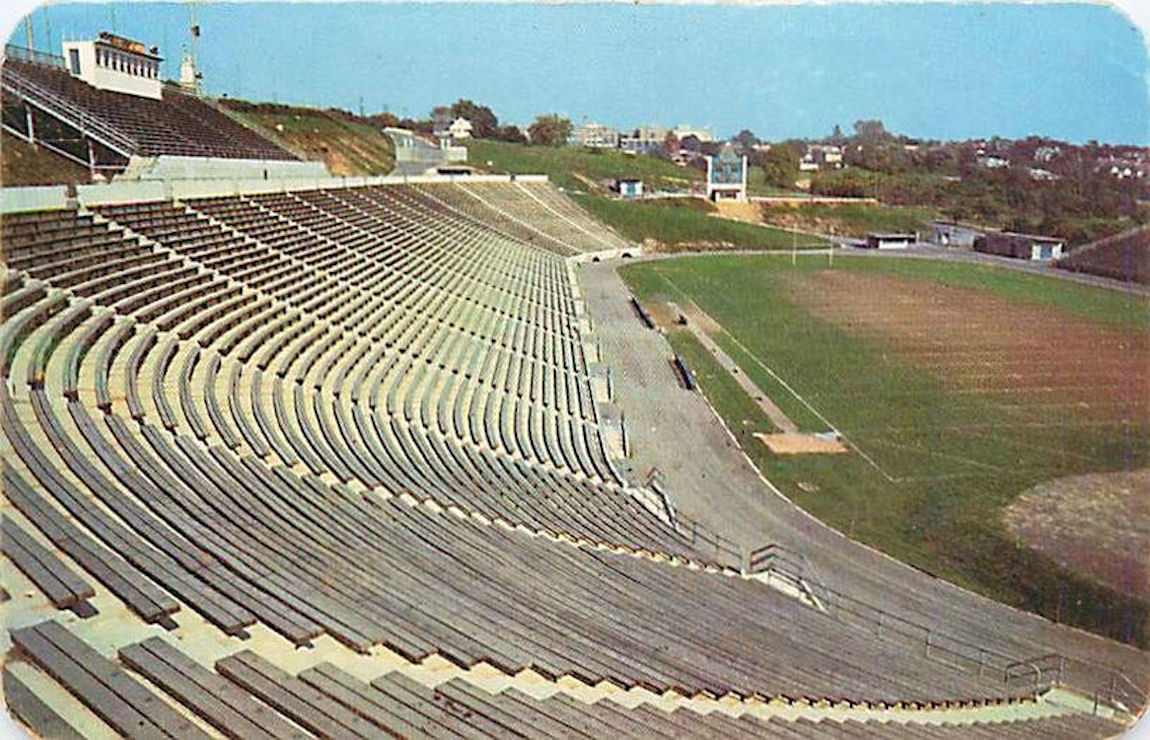
J. Birney Crum Stadium, a 15,000-capacity stadium in Allentown, is the largest high school football stadium in the Mid-Atlantic United States and the home field for three Eastern Pennsylvania Conference high school football teams: Allen, Central Catholic, and Dieruff high schools.

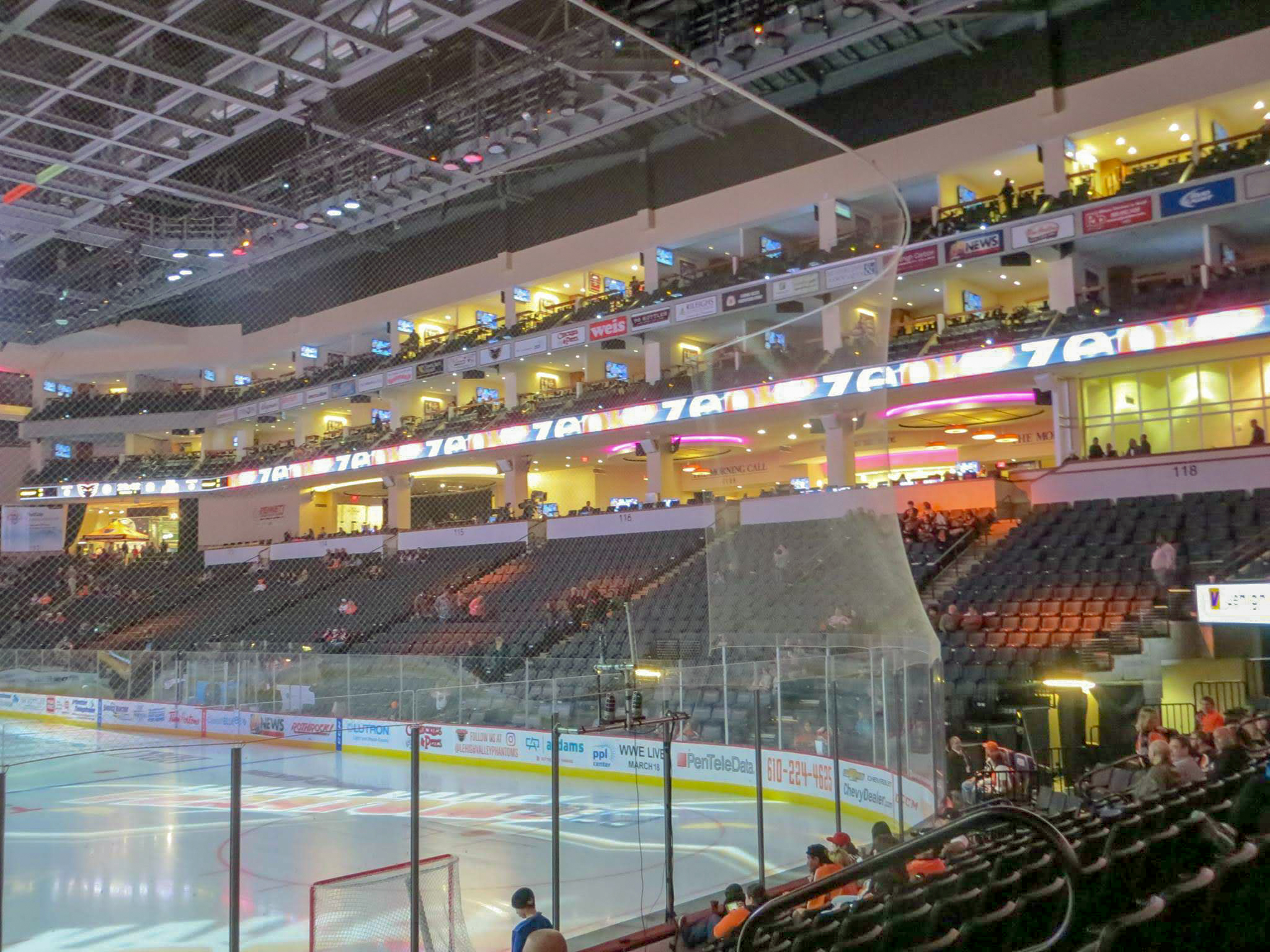
PPL Center in Allentown, the home arena of the Lehigh Valley Phantoms of the American Hockey League and the primary development team of the Philadelphia Flyers

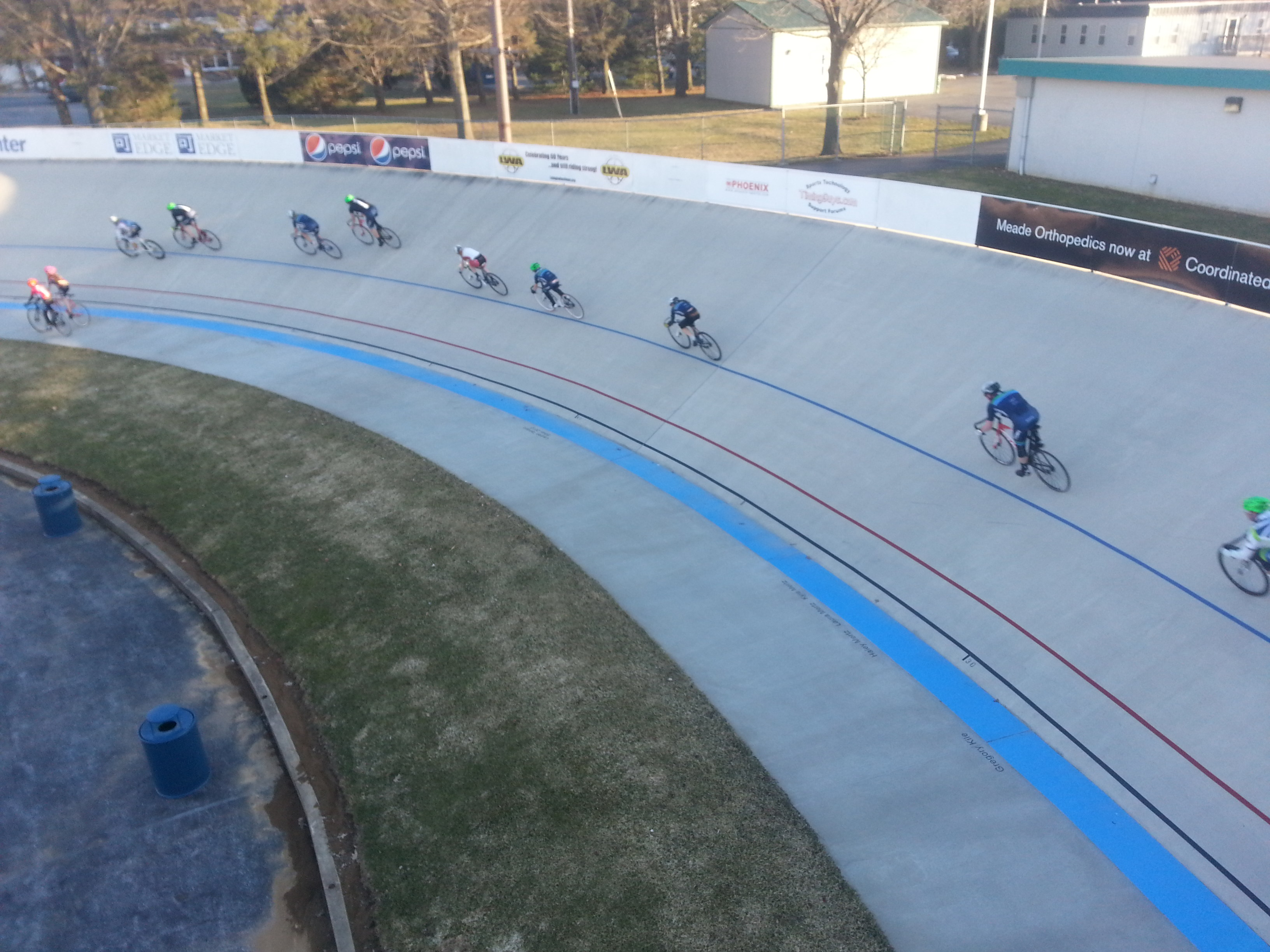
Valley Preferred Cycling Center in Breinigsville, in April 2014

Club	League	Sport	Venue	Established	Championships
Lehigh Valley IronPigs	IL	Baseball	Coca-Cola Park	2008	0
Lehigh Valley Phantoms	AHL	Ice hockey	PPL Center	1996	2 1997-98 and 2004-05
Lehigh Valley Roller Derby	WFTDA	Roller Derby	Bethlehem Municipal Ice Rink	2006	0
Lehigh Valley United	USL League Two	Soccer	Rocco Calvo Field	2009	1 2012 (conference)

=== Football ===
==== College football ====
The Lehigh Valley is home to the nation's longest-standing college football rivalry in the nation. Known as "The Rivalry," Lafayette College in Easton and Lehigh University in Bethlehem have played each other 160 times since 1884, making it the most-played rivalry in college football history. Two other Lehigh Valley colleges, Moravian University in Bethlehem and Muhlenberg College in Allentown, have competitive collegiate football programs; Muhlenberg plays their home football games at Scotty Wood Stadium on the Muhlenberg campus in Allentown.

==== National Football League ====
From 1996 until 2012, the Lehigh Valley hosted the pre-season training camp for the NFL's Philadelphia Eagles, which was held each summer at Goodman Stadium and other football fields at Lehigh University in Bethlehem. On August 5, 2012, Garrett Reid, the 29-year-old son of then Eagles head coach Andy Reid, was found dead in his Lehigh University dorm room during training camp from a heroin overdose. The following year, in 2013, following the Garrett Reid overdose and the hiring of new head coach Chip Kelly, the Eagles chose to move their training camp to the NovaCare Complex in South Philadelphia.

=== Gymnastics ===
Parkettes National Gymnastics Training Center in Allentown has been the training ground for numerous Olympic and U.S. national gymnastics champions. In 2003, CNN aired a highly critical documentary on the center, Achieving the Perfect 10, which depicted its as a hugely demanding and excessively competitive training program.

=== High school athletics ===
The 18 largest high schools in the Lehigh Valley and Pocono Mountain regions compete athletically in the Eastern Pennsylvania Conference (EPC), one of the nation's premier athletic divisions. An additional 14 Lehigh Valley high schools too small to compete in the EPC belong to the Colonial League.

The EPC has produced numerous professional and Olympic athletes, including MLB, the NBA, and the NFL professional athletes. The EPC's football, basketball, field hockey, and wrestling teams are often ranked among the nation's best. In high school field hockey, Emmaus High School in Emmaus has won 33 consecutive EPC championships as of 2021.

The Lehigh Valley's high school wrestling programs have been described as "among the nation's best in the sport for nearly three decades" and WIN magazine has ranked the region's wrestling programs best in the nation.

=== Professional baseball ===
In 2008, Coca-Cola Park, an 8,278-seat Minor League baseball stadium, opened in east-side Allentown. The stadium is the home field for the Lehigh Valley IronPigs, the Triple-A affiliate of the Philadelphia Phillies of Major League Baseball. The team previously played as the Ottawa Lynx from 1993 until moving to Allentown in 2008. The club's move to the Lehigh Valley brought the franchise closer to Philadelphia and the Phillies' large Lehigh Valley fan base. The team's name is a reference to pig iron, which is used in steelmaking for which the Lehigh Valley area is known worldwide. Groundbreaking ceremonies for Coca-Cola Park were held September 6, 2006, and construction was completed in December 2007. The stadium's first game was March 30, 2008, featuring the Phillies major league team playing the Lehigh Valley IronPigs.

=== Professional ice hockey ===
On September 10, 2014, the PPL Center, an 8,500-seat arena in Center City Allentown, was opened as the new home arena for the Lehigh Valley Phantoms, the American Hockey League affiliate of the Philadelphia Flyers, and for other sporting and entertainment events. The Phantoms began play at PPL Center with their 2014–15 season. The arena takes up the entire block between Seventh and Eighth and Hamilton and Linden streets.

=== Roller derby ===
Lehigh Valley Roller Derby (LVRG) is a Women's Flat Track Derby Association league based at Bethlehem Municipal Ice Rink in Bethlehem in the Lehigh Valley. The league's teams compete nationally and internationally.

=== Running events ===
The Lehigh Valley Health Network Via Marathon, sponsored by Lehigh Valley Health Network, features a certified marathon, five-person team relay, a 20-mile (32 km) training run, and 5K walk annually in September. The 42.195-kilometer (26.219 mi) course follows the Lehigh River Canal Towpath from Allentown to Easton. In 2015, the marathon came under scrutiny when Mike Rossi achieved viral fame after allegedly cheating in the marathon to qualify for the Boston Marathon. In response, Via Marathon organizers added timing mats and video surveillance on the course. Lehigh University's Paul Short Run is held annually at the Goodman Cross Country Course; participation has climbed to over 5,000 runners spread throughout 14 college and high school races. The Emmaus 5K race is held annually in mid-October, coinciding with Emmaus' annual Halloween parade.

=== Track cycling ===
The Lehigh Valley is home to the Valley Preferred Cycling Center, a cycling velodrome in Breinigsville that hosts professional and amateur cycling competitions, including Union Cycliste Internationale-sponsored competitions. Valley Preferred Cycling Center has given rise to several Olympian cycling medal winners.

== Culture ==
The Allentown Art Museum, located in Center City Allentown, is the Lehigh Valley's largest museum with over 11,000 works of art. Lehigh University's Zoellner Arts Center and Lafayette College's smaller Williams Center for the Arts host a variety of plays, concerts, and performances throughout the year. The Allentown Symphony Orchestra, conducted by Diane Wittry since 1995, performs at Allentown's historic Miller Symphony Hall. The Banana Factory, located in South Bethlehem, has several art studios and galleries open to the public.

== Recreation ==
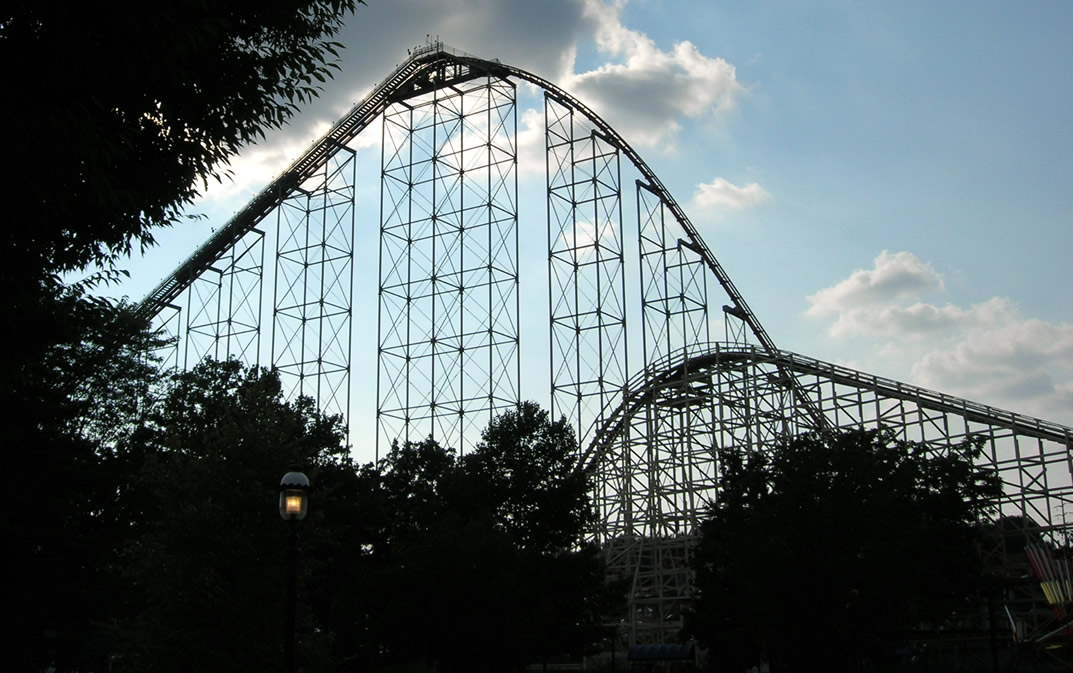
Dorney Park's Steel Force and Thunderhawk roller coasters in South Whitehall Township in the Lehigh Valley. Steel Force is the eighth-tallest steel roller coaster in the world with a first drop of 205 feet (62 m) and a top speed of 75 miles per hour (121 km/h).

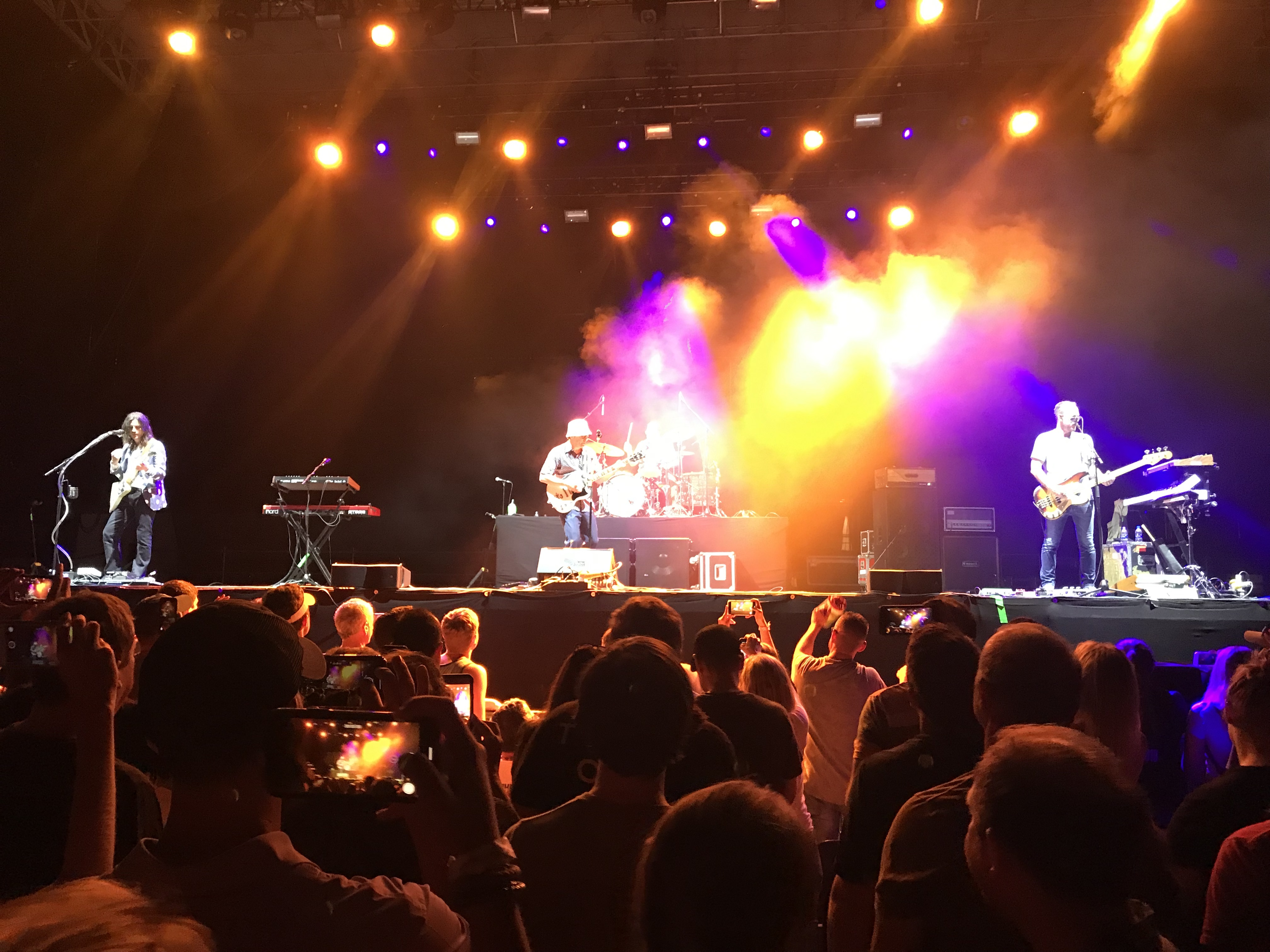
Musikfest, the nation's largest free music festival, held annually in Bethlehem

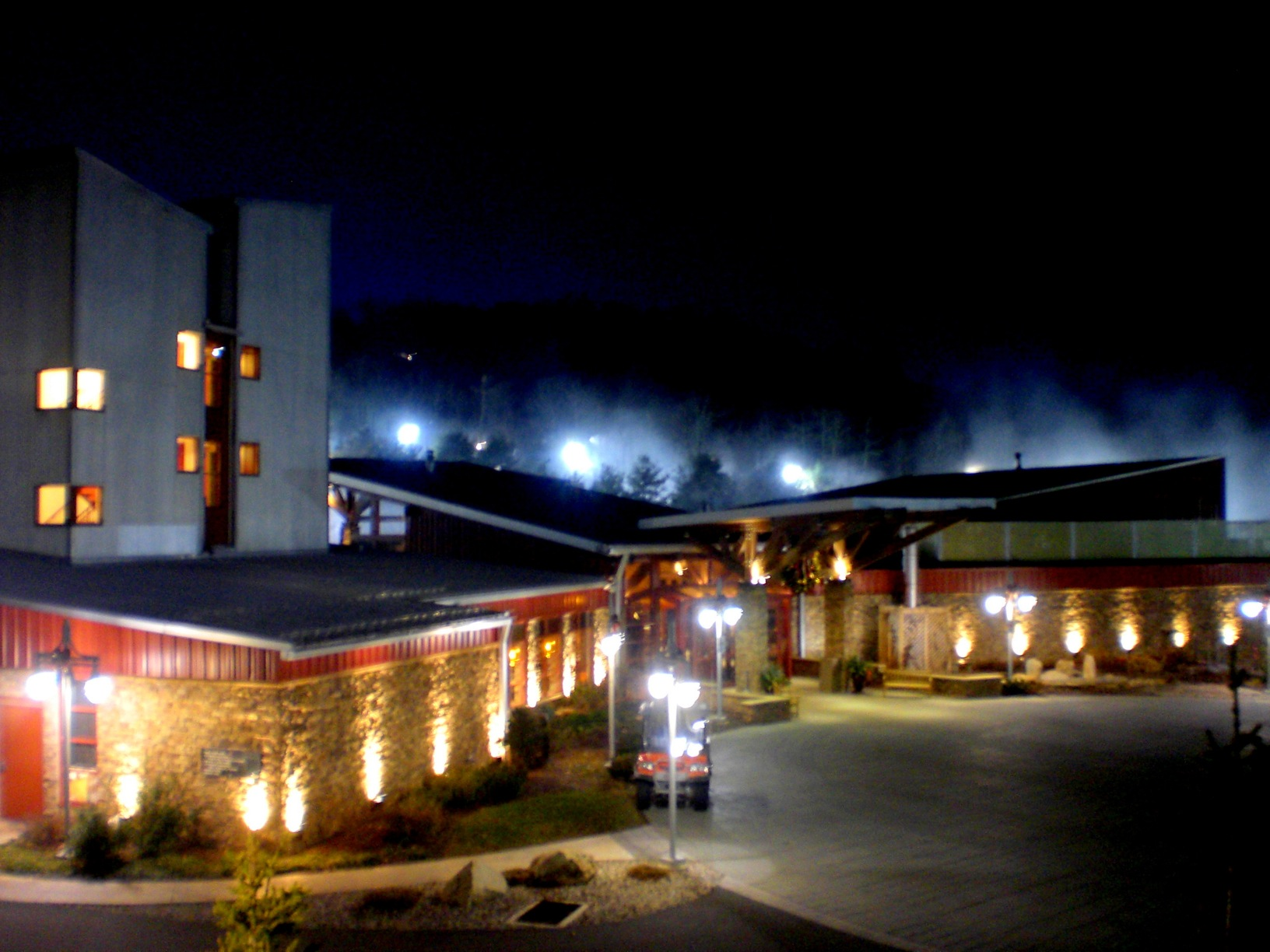
The ski lodge at Bear Creek Mountain Resort in Macungie

=== Amusement park ===
The Lehigh Valley is home to Dorney Park & Wildwater Kingdom, a popular amusement and water park, located in South Whitehall Township. Dorney Park is known nationally for its elaborate roller coasters and water rides.

=== Casino ===
In 2009, Sands Casino Resort, an $879 million casino, hotel and apartment complex then owned by the Las Vegas Sands opened in Bethlehem, Pennsylvania, bringing legalized table and sports gambling to the Lehigh Valley for the first time. In 2018, the casino was renamed Wind Creek Bethlehem following its $1.3 billion sale to Wind Creek Hospitality. Wind Creek Bethlehem is one of only 13 authorized gaming sites in Pennsylvania.

=== Festivals ===
Several large festivals are held annually in the Lehigh Valley. The Great Allentown Fair, first held in 1852, is held annually in late August through early September at the Allentown Fairgrounds in Allentown. Musikfest, a large, eleven-day music festival, is held annually in Bethlehem, Pennsylvania each August. Das Awkscht Fescht, an antique car festival, is held annually the beginning of August in Macungie's Memorial Park. Blues, Brews, and Barbeque, launched in 2014, is held annually in May in Center City Allentown. Mayfair Festival of the Arts, a three-day arts festival, is held annually the end of May on the campus of Cedar Crest College in Allentown.

=== Golf and skiing ===
The Valley's multiple golf courses include Saucon Valley Country Club in Upper Saucon Township, which hosted the 2009 U.S. Women's Open. Others include Allentown Municipal Golf Course, Brookside Country Club in Macungie, Green Pond Country Club in Bethlehem, Lehigh Country Club on Cedar Crest Boulevard in Allentown, Olde Homestead Golf Club in New Tripoli, Riverview Country Club in Easton, Shepherd Hills Golf Club in Wescosville, Steel Club in Hellertown, Southmoore Golf Course in Bath, Wedgewood Golf Course in Coopersburg, Willow Brook Golf Course in Northampton, and others.

=== Ice sports and skiing ===
The region's primary ski resort is Bear Creek Mountain Resort, a 23 slope resort in Macungie. Three Lehigh Valley locations exist for ice skating, ice hockey, figure skating, and speed skating. Steel Ice Center is on East 1st Street in Bethlehem, The Rink Ice Arena is in Lehigh County, and the City of Bethlehem maintains a covered 23,000-square-foot outdoor ice rink from November through March. Bethlehem Skateplaza on Steel Avenue in Bethlehem is a city park for skateboarding and freestyle BMX.

=== Parks and zoo ===
The Lehigh Valley Zoo in Schnecksville is a 29-acre (11.7 ha) zoo open year-round. The Lehigh Valley has a number of public parks, including the 629-acre (254.5 ha) Lehigh Parkway along the Lehigh River in Allentown and the 1,108-acre (448.4 ha) Trexler Nature Preserve in Schnecksville.

== Transportation ==
=== Air transportation ===
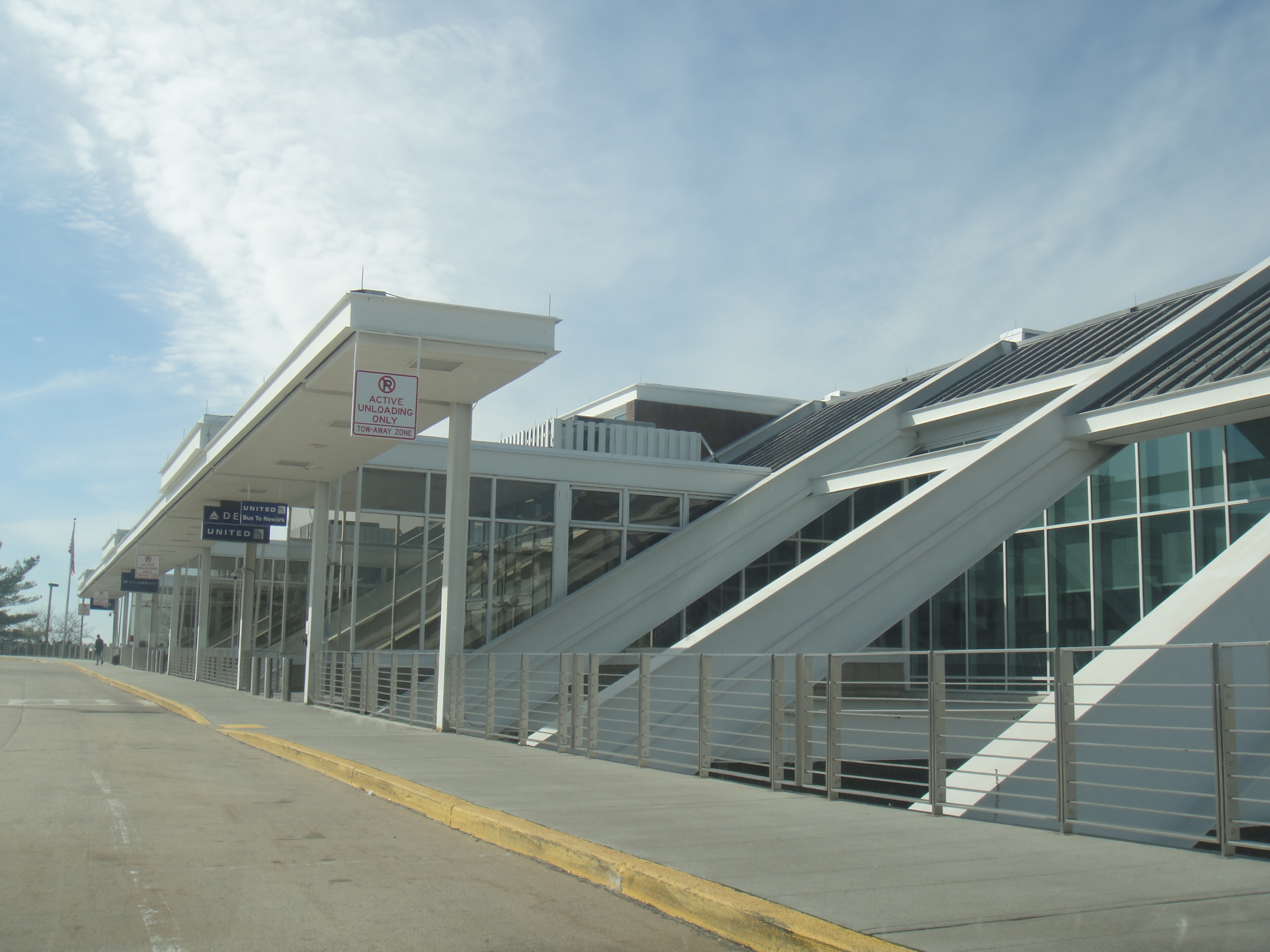
Main terminal at Lehigh Valley International Airport in Hanover Township, March 2014

The Lehigh Valley's primary commercial airport is Lehigh Valley International Airport (IATA: ABE, ICAO: KABE) in Hanover Township in the Lehigh Valley, roughly 7 miles (11 km) north-northeast of Allentown, 4 miles (6.4 km) northwest of Bethlehem, Pennsylvania, and 11 miles (18 km) west-southwest of Easton. The airport was utilized by 851,000 passengers in 2020. Allegiant Air recently completed a significant expansion at the airport.

The Valley is also served by Allentown Queen City Municipal Airport, a two-runway general aviation facility located off Allentown's Lehigh Street, used predominantly by private aviation. Other general-aviation airports include Braden Airpark (also owned by the Lehigh-Northampton Airport Authority) in Easton, Pennsylvania, Hackettstown Airport in eastern Warren County, New Jersey, and Jake Arner Memorial Airport in Lehighton.

=== Bus transportation ===
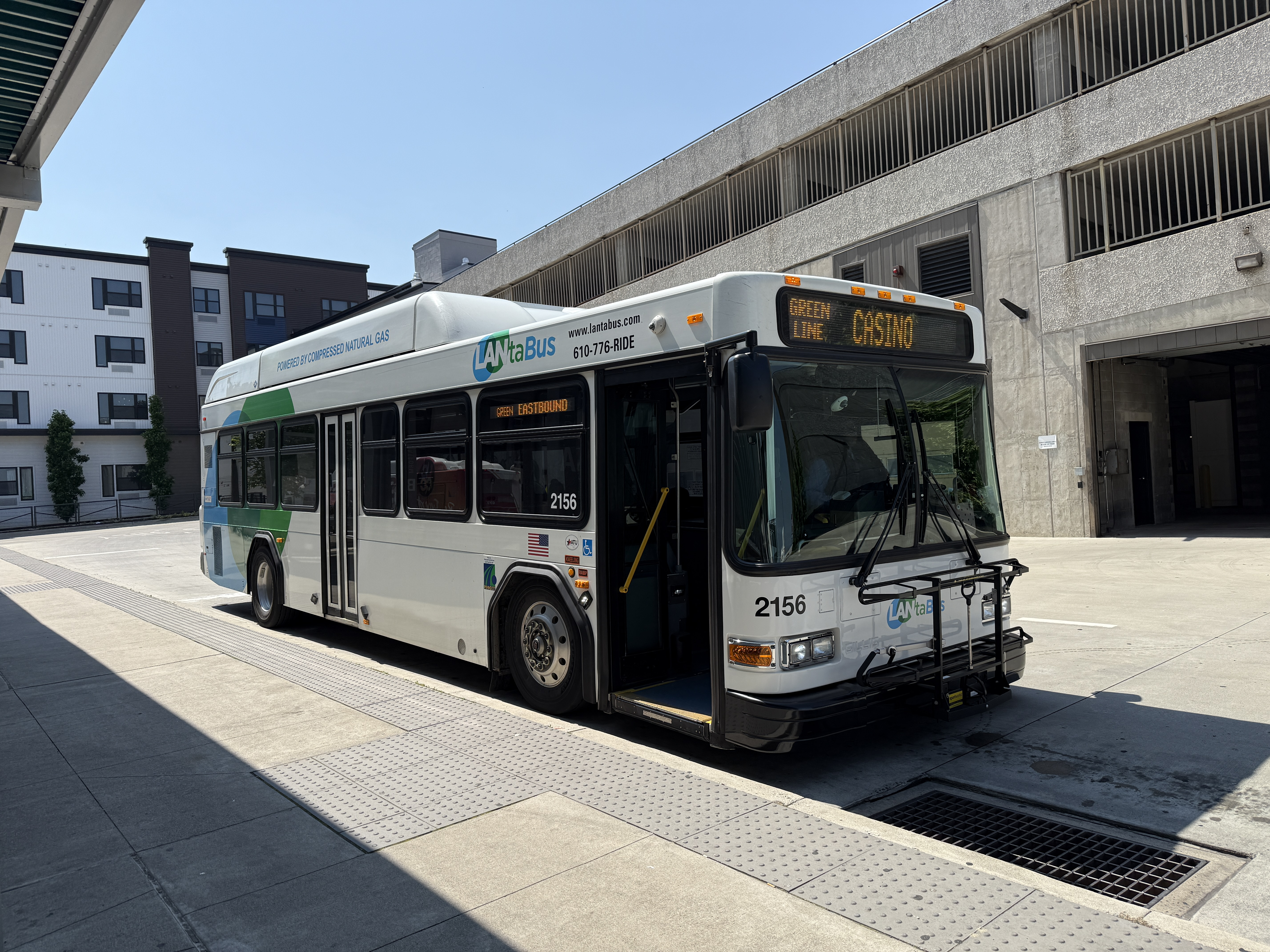
A LANta bus in Allentown in June 2025

Public bus service in Lehigh Valley is available through LANta, the region's public transportation service. In New Jersey, bus service is provided by NJ Transit, including to the Easton Intermodal Transportation Center in Easton.

The Lehigh Valley has several commercial bus services, including Greyhound Lines, Klein Transportation, and Trailways, and others, that provide transportation to and from New York City, Philadelphia, Reading, Harrisburg, and other regional destinations throughout the day. OurBus provides service to and from Philadelphia. Martz Trailways provides transport from the region to Scranton via Wilkes-Barre, and also provides service to Philadelphia as an Amtrak Thruway route that connects to Amtrak at 30th Street Station in Philadelphia. Chinatown bus lines operates multiple round trip bus lines daily between Manhattan and Wind Creek Bethlehem in Bethlehem; as of 2014, more than 3,000 passengers daily utilized Chinatown bus lines' service from Manhattan to Wind Creek Bethlehem.

=== Commercial rail ===
The Lehigh Valley is a major national thruway for commercial rail transport with roughly 65 commercial trains passing through the Valley daily. The region's largest freight rail operator is Norfolk Southern Railway, which uses two former rail lines, Lehigh Valley Railroad's Lehigh Line and Reading Railroad's Reading Line. Norfolk Southern Railway has major classification rail yards in both Allentown and Bethlehem.

=== Passenger rail ===
Passenger train service in the Valley is available just outside the Lehigh Valley at Doylestown (31.2 miles (50.2 km) southeast), at Annandale, New Jersey (roughly 41.8 miles (67.3 km) east), and at Hackettstown station in Hackettstown, New Jersey (49.5 miles (79.7 km) northeast). The Valley's closest Amtrak station is Bryn Mawr SEPTA, 50.4 miles (81.1 km) miles south of the Valley. Two major passenger rail hubs, 30th Street Station in Philadelphia and Newark Penn Station in Newark, New Jersey, are roughly 60 miles (97 km) southeast and 81.9 miles (131.8 km) west, respectively.

In March 2023, the Pennsylvania Department of Transportation funded a preliminary study to assess the feasibility of restoring passenger rail to the region.

=== Roads ===
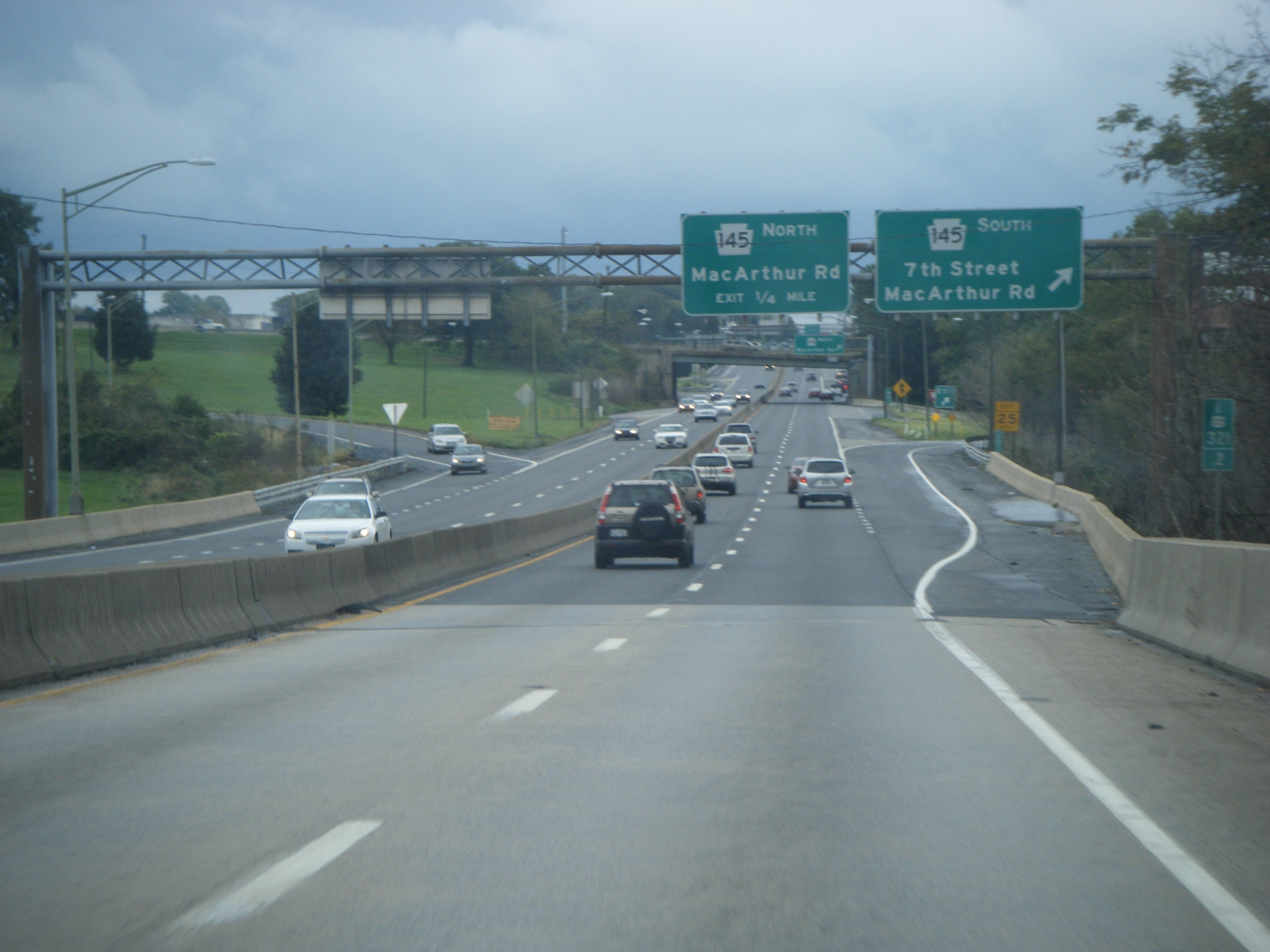
US 22 eastbound in Whitehall Township in the Lehigh Valley, in October 2011

The Lehigh Valley is accessible from four major highways:

- Interstate 476, the Northeast Extension of the Pennsylvania Turnpike, is a toll highway that runs 131 miles (211 km) from Chester in the south to Scranton and Wilkes-Barre region in the north.
- Interstate 78 is a major east–west highway that runs through the southern part of the Valley and is duplexed with Pennsylvania Route 309. I-78 runs from Lebanon County in the west to the Holland Tunnel and Lower Manhattan in the east.
- Pennsylvania Route 33 runs north–south through the Lehigh Valley from the Poconos in the north to Northampton County in the south.
- U.S. Route 22 is a major freeway that runs through the Valley from Kuhnsville in the western part of the Valley to Easton in the Valley's east. The highway extends from Cincinnati, Ohio in the west through the Valley to Newark, New Jersey at its eastern terminus.

Other major Lehigh Valley roads include:

- Cedar Crest Boulevard is a north–south highway that runs from North Whitehall Township in the north through West Allentown to Emmaus in the south.
- Lehigh Street runs northeast to southwest, originating in Center City Allentown and terminating in Emmaus.
- Pennsylvania Route 145 is a divided local road that leads to the Lehigh Valley Mall and its surrounding commercial district.
- Tilghman Street runs from Fogelsville in the west, continuing as Union Boulevard to Bethlehem in the east. Tilghman Street runs through most of Allentown, intersecting with Cedar Crest Boulevard, Pennsylvania Route 100, Pennsylvania Route 309, and other major Lehigh Valley highways.

== Telecommunications ==
The Lehigh Valley area initially was served only by the 215 area code from 1947, when the North American Numbering Plan of the Bell System went into effect, until 1994. With the region's growing population, the Lehigh Valley was granted area code 610 in 1994, which remains the predominant area code for the Lehigh Valley currently. An overlay area code, 484, was added to the 610 service area in 1999. Area code 835 entered service on September 2, 2022.

== Wine ==
Lehigh Valley AVA, which was designated an official American Viticultural Area in March 2008, includes 230 acres (93 ha) of vineyards planted to several Vitis vinifera and French-American hybrid grape varieties. Blue Mountain Vineyards in New Tripoli accounts of over 50 acres (20 ha) of the 230 acres and has won national and international awards. As of 2008, an estimated 15 to 20% of all wine produced commercially in Pennsylvania comes from grapes grown in the Lehigh Valley AVA.

== Notable people ==
Since its settlement in the 18th century, the Lehigh Valley has been the birthplace or home to several famous Americans, including:

- Mario Andretti, former professional race car driver
- Michael Andretti, professional racing team owner and former race car driver
- Saquon Barkley, professional football player, Philadelphia Eagles
- Chuck Bednarik, former professional football player, Philadelphia Eagles, 1967 Pro Football Hall of Fame inductee
- Stephen Vincent Benét, former novelist and Pulitzer Prize-winning poet
- Howard J. Buss, composer, music publisher, former trombonist
- Sabrina Carpenter, singer and actress
- Leon Carr, former Broadway songwriter and composer
- Jack Coleman, television actor, Dynasty, Heroes, The Office, and Castle
- Michaela Conlin, television actress, Bones
- H.D., former poet and novelist
- Jimmy DeGrasso, heavy metal drummer, Ozzy Osbourne, Alice Cooper Band, Megadeth, Dokken, and Ratt
- Dane DeHaan, television and film actor, In Treatment, Chronicle, A Cure for Wellness, and Valerian and the City of a Thousand Planets
- Devon, adult film actress
- Keith Dorney, former professional football player, Detroit Lions
- Jonathan Frakes, actor, Star Trek: The Next Generation
- Mike Hartenstine, former professional football player, Chicago Bears and Minnesota Vikings
- Bob Heffner, former professional baseball player, Boston Red Sox, California Angels, and Cleveland Indians
- Tim Heidecker, actor, comedian, musician, Tim and Eric Awesome Show, Great Job! and Decker
- Larry Holmes, former boxing heavyweight champion
- Todd Howard, video game designer, Fallout and The Elder Scrolls
- Lee Iacocca, former president and chief executive officer, Chrysler
- Keith Jarrett, jazz musician
- Michael Johns, healthcare executive and former White House presidential speechwriter
- Dwayne Johnson ("The Rock"), actor and former professional wrestler
- Billy Kidman, former professional wrestler and WWE producer
- Daniel Dae Kim, film and television actor, Lost
- Steve Kimock, rock musician
- Brian Knobbs, former professional wrestler
- Dan Koppen, former professional football player, Denver Broncos and New England Patriots
- Carson Kressley, fashion consultant, Bravo's Queer Eye
- Lisa Ann, adult film actress
- Varvara Lepchenko, professional tennis player
- Jonathan Linton, former professional football player, Buffalo Bills
- Carmen Maria Machado, literary fiction author
- William Marchant, former playwright and screenwriter
- Kristen Maloney, 2000 Summer Olympics gymnast
- Ed McCaffrey, former professional football player, Denver Broncos, New York Giants, and San Francisco 49ers
- Kate Micucci, actress, comedian, singer, and songwriter
- Matt Millen, former professional football player, Oakland Raiders, San Francisco 49ers, and Washington Redskins and former president and general manager, Detroit Lions
- Lara Jill Miller, actress and voice actress, Gimme a Break! and The Amanda Show
- Marty Nothstein, former Olympic gold medal winner, track cycling
- Andre Reed, former professional football player, Buffalo Bills and Washington Redskins, 2014 Pro Football Hall of Fame inductee
- Ian Riccaboni, author and Ring of Honor professional wrestling sports broadcaster
- Daniel Roebuck, actor, Matlock, Lost, Glee, and Grimm
- Jimmie Schaffer, former professional baseball player, Chicago Cubs, Chicago White Sox, Cincinnati Reds, New York Mets, Philadelphia Phillies and St. Louis Cardinals
- Brian Schneider, former professional baseball player, Miami Marlins, New York Mets, Philadelphia Phillies, and Washington Nationals
- Amanda Seyfried, actress, Veronica Mars, Big Love, Mamma Mia!, and Les Misérables
- Curt Simmons, former professional baseball player, California Angels, Chicago Cubs, Philadelphia Phillies, and St. Louis Cardinals
- Dana Snyder, voice actor, Adult Swim's Aqua Teen Hunger Force
- Christine Taylor, actress and wife of actor Ben Stiller
- Jonathan Taylor Thomas, actor, Home Improvement
- Bobby Weaver, 1984 Summer Olympics gold medal winner, wrestling
- Lauren Weisberger, author, The Devil Wears Prada
- Cindy Werley, 1996 Summer Olympics field hockey player
- Jordan White, rock musician
- David Zinczenko, founder and chief executive officer, Galvanized, and author, Eat This, Not That
- David Zippel, Tony-award-winning lyricist, City of Angels
