= Locust Valley, Pennsylvania =

Unincorporated community in Pennsylvania, US

Locust Valley
- Unincorporated community
- Location of Locust Valley in Pennsylvania Location in the United States
- Coordinates: 40°29′48.084″N 75°24′22.5576″W
- Country: United States
- State: Pennsylvania
- County: Lehigh
- Township: Upper Saucon
- Elevation: 642 ft (196 m)

Population
  - Metro: 865,310 (US: 68th)
- Time zone: UTC-5 (EST)
- Zip Code: 18036
- Area code: 610

Locust Valley was a village located in the southeastern corner of Lehigh County, Pennsylvania, United States. The village is located at the southern end of Upper Saucon Township. It is part of the Lehigh Valley, which has a population of 861,899 and is the 68th-most populous metropolitan area in the U.S. as of the 2020 census.

The village developed around the crossroad of what today is Locust Valley Road and Blue Church Road South. This area is bordered by Springfield Township and Milford Township in Bucks County along with Lower Milford Township in Lehigh County.

In the mid-1800s, George W. Foering planted an avenue of locust trees, which was the basis for the village's name. Locust trees are still prevalent in the area, including those on the Locust Valley golf course.

Locust Valley has a Coopersburg mailing address.

== History ==
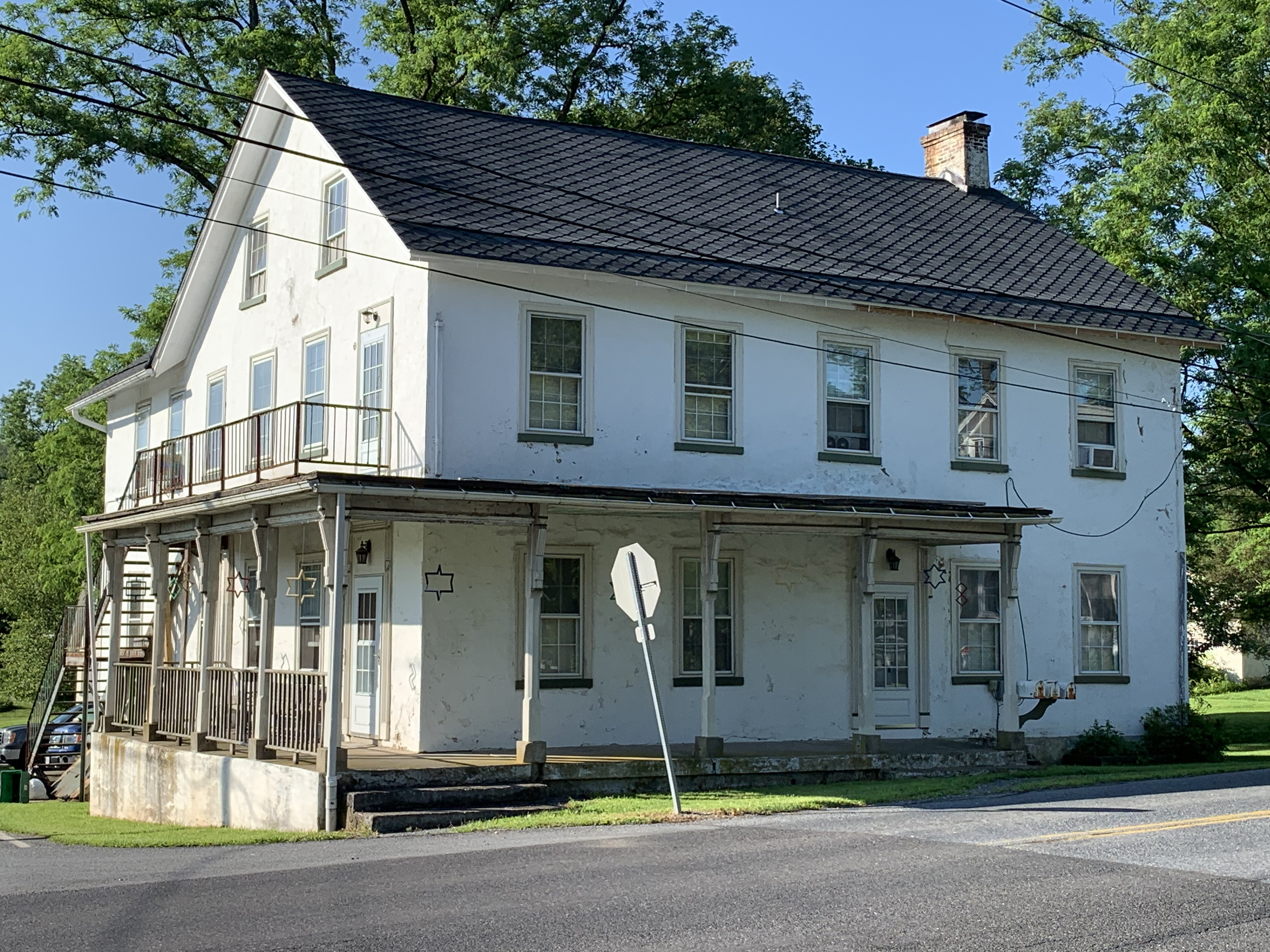
The 1832 building that housed the tavern and post office

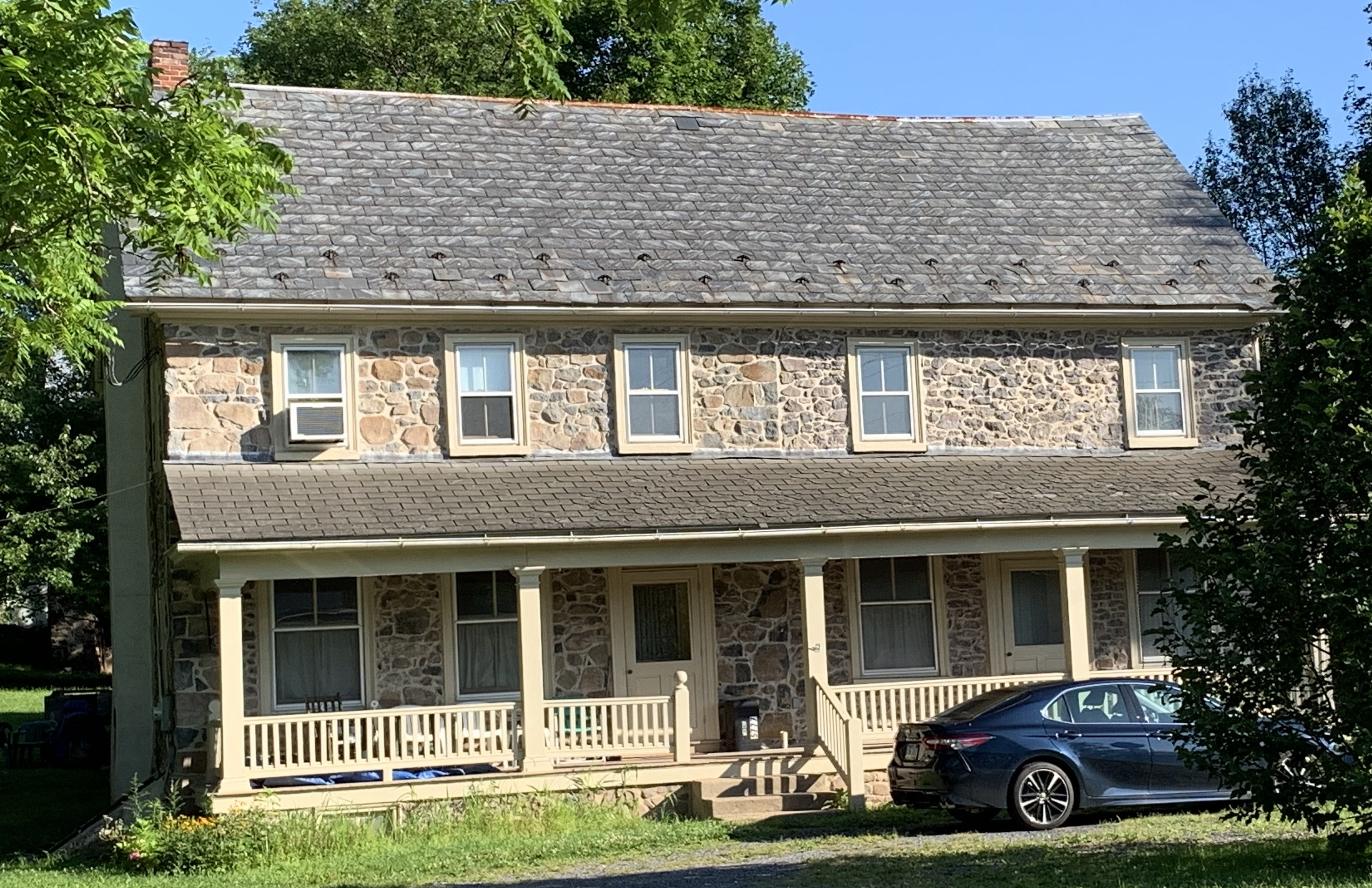
The 1870 building at site of the Trumbaur Store

The land that today is Locust Valley was part of an area called Lenapehoking and occupied by the Lenape native people prior to the arrival of European settlers. The Unami were the specific division of the Lenape locally, and they referred to this area as "The Valley Watered by Many Springs".

William Penn founded the colony of Province of Pennsylvania in 1681. Locust Valley area was then part of Bucks County, one of three original counties created by Penn in 1682. The Lenape people were pushed west as a result of this purchase and subsequent purchases of land by William Penn. A purchase in 1732 further secured the area of the Lehigh Valley.

=== 18th century ===
German immigrants settled the Locust Valley area around 1735 calling it Die Gass (the valley). The local immigrants formally organized this area as Upper Saucon Township in 1743. At the founding of the township, Locust Valley was one of five villages in the township, the others being Centre Valley, Friedensville, Spring Valley and Colesville. Then, in 1752, this area became part of newly created Northampton County. Since 1812, when Northampton County was divided into two, Locust Valley has been located in Lehigh County.

Warrants were given to the original settlers for purchase of plots of land. The first one in the Locust Valley area was given to Henry Rumfield in 1736 (tract #12). The plot (#14) warranted to George Morsteller in 1737 encompassed the hub of Locust Valley. Subsequent warrants (in chronological order) were given to John Adam Stout (#96), George Bachman (#11 & #97), George Bastian (#13), Cornelius Crump (#98), Jacob Weaver (#100), Leonard Boydelman (#142), Jacob Bachman (#143), and Peter Cortz (#144). During the American Revolution, George Bachman was one of the residents who was imprisoned and had all of his property confiscated because he was reluctant to bear arms.

An official road between Locust Valley and Lanark opened in 1750, which today is a combination of Blue Church and Lanark Roads.

=== 19th century ===
The village developed around an iron mill, P. Weaver Foundry, that is located near the headwaters of Laurel Run, the south branch of Saucon Creek). Laurel Run is a regulated trout stream in Pennsylvania. The mill race can still be seen as part of Locust Valley Golf Course.

In 1862, the village was home to the W. Trumbaur Store on the northwest corner of Locust Valley Rd & Blue Church Rd S. It was either in a portion of the existing 1870 building or one prior to it.

The Locust Valley post office was established on February 4, 1863. It was run by Peter Weaver out of the building (1832) on the southwest corner of the village crossroads which also served as a tavern. The Post Office continued until Rural Free Delivery service was initiated around 1900.

A tannery was still in operation in 1884.

=== 20th century ===
In 1910, Frank G. Hartman and his brother-in-law, Harvey Hersh, who lived in Locust Valley, opened a foundry and machine shop called Hersh & Hartman. Frank brought twenty years of experience working at Bethlehem Steel Co., having worked there since age 16, into this new venture.

In 1954, Locust Valley Country Club was granted a charter and opened on Memorial Day as a 9-hole private club. The 125 acre property, including an 1806, 16 room fieldstone house was purchased from the Donald Smith estate, which spans Bucks and Lehigh Counties. William F. Gordon was the designer of the course having also designed one of the courses at Saucon Valley Country Club.

In 1985, Locust Valley became a public course. Baseball legends Joe DiMaggio, Bob Feller, Brooks Robinson, and Bobby Thomson, and Pro Football Hall of Fame inductee Chuck Bednarik played in a tournament in 1986. Arnold Palmer was known to practice at Locust Valley since his first wife, Winnie Walzer, was from Coopersburg. The original 1806 home was razed in 2017.

== Education ==
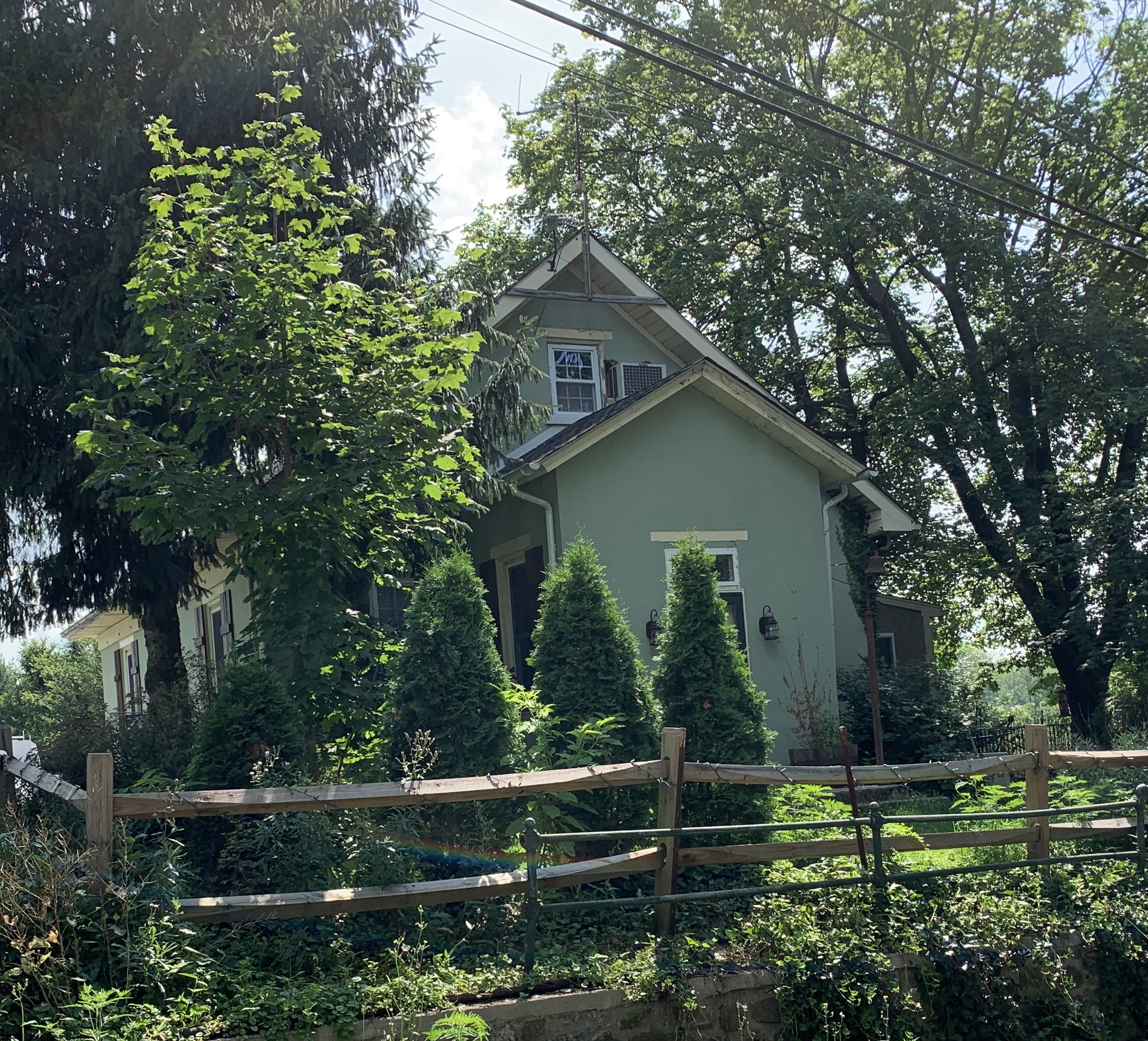
A 2019 photo of the Locust Valley Schoolhouse, built in 1880

A one room schoolhouse was first opened in 1850 two years after the township adopted the common school system. The school was about one-half mile directly north on what is now Blue Church Rd South. Prior to this, students were educated in private homes or churches (there was a school at the Blue Church, for example). The education was conducted in German exclusively until about 1800, before beginning to transition toward English. Replacing the first building, a new schoolhouse was opened in 1880 with a tower and bell being added in 1902. In 1884, the school was furnished with a blackboard, globe and patent desks.

This school operated until 1941 when the district became more centralized and children were bused to larger community schools. In 1946, there were three buses serving the township, and the Locust Valley students were transported to the Lanark School. The other township school was Center Valley School (1940)). The Lanark School was built in 1941 and was located in the northern part of the township, on the east side of Pennsylvania Route 309. Most recently a law firm] has occupied the building with an address of Schoolhouse Lane.

Locust Valley Schoolhouse was auctioned off and remodeled into a residence. This building is still in existence as a residential home at the intersection of Blue Church Rd S and Beverly Hills Rd. Students in Locust Valley initially attended schools in Allentown School District.

Southern Lehigh School District, which serves Locust Valley public students, was developed in the late 20th century. Students in grades nine through 12 attend Southern Lehigh High School in Center Valley.

== Churches ==
Worship would have initially been conducted in homes or other gathering spots before specific structures were built. The first designated building for worship was the Mennonite meetinghouse in Coopersburg, built about 1738.

The next church constructed within the Upper Saucon area was St. Paul's Blue Church. The first church, built of logs, was in use by 1742. Later, the Friedens church, the Mennonite Brethren in Christ church, the English Methodist church and the Free Methodist churches were constructed.

== Notable properties ==
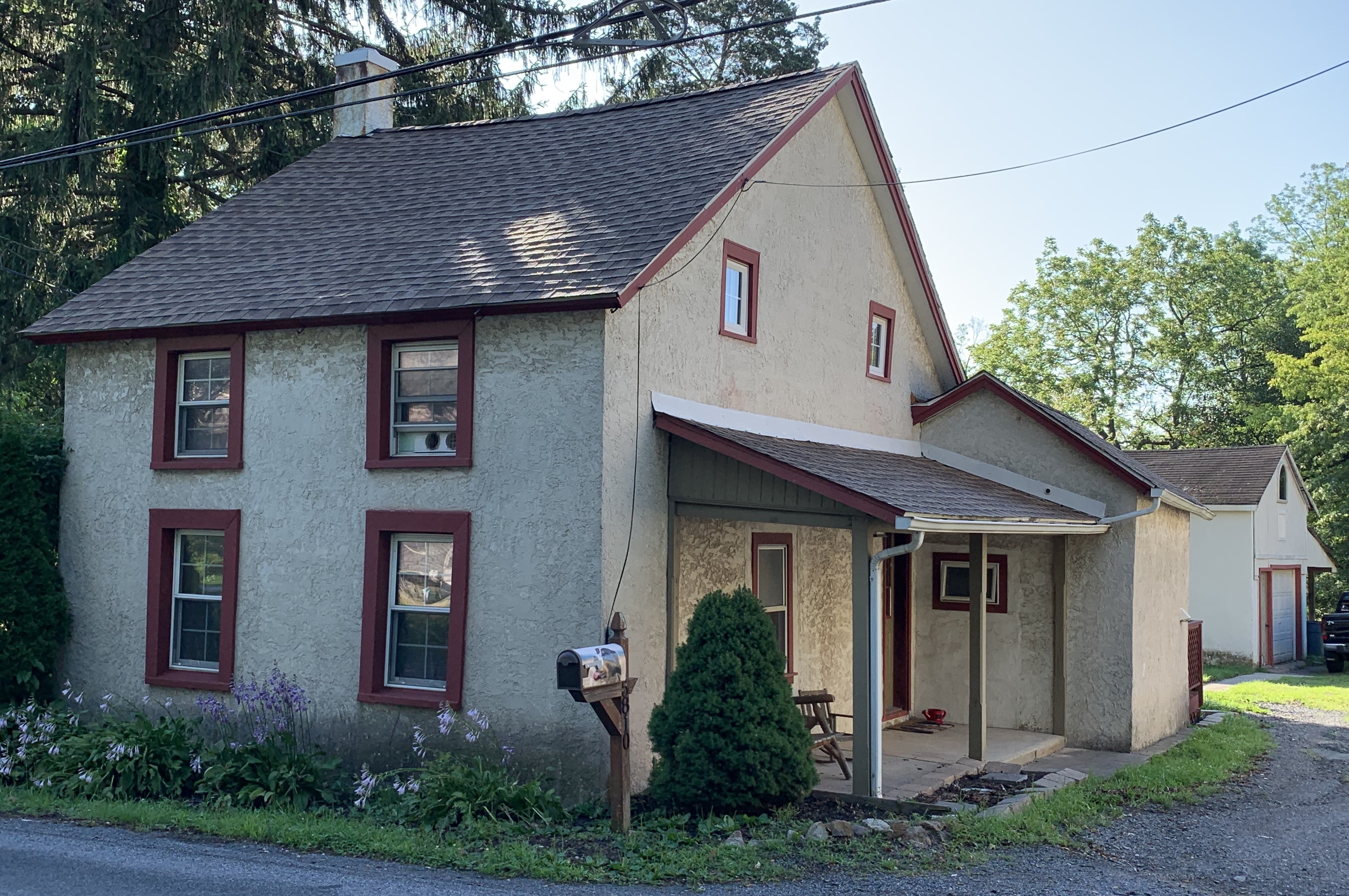
A 1750 Locust Valley home

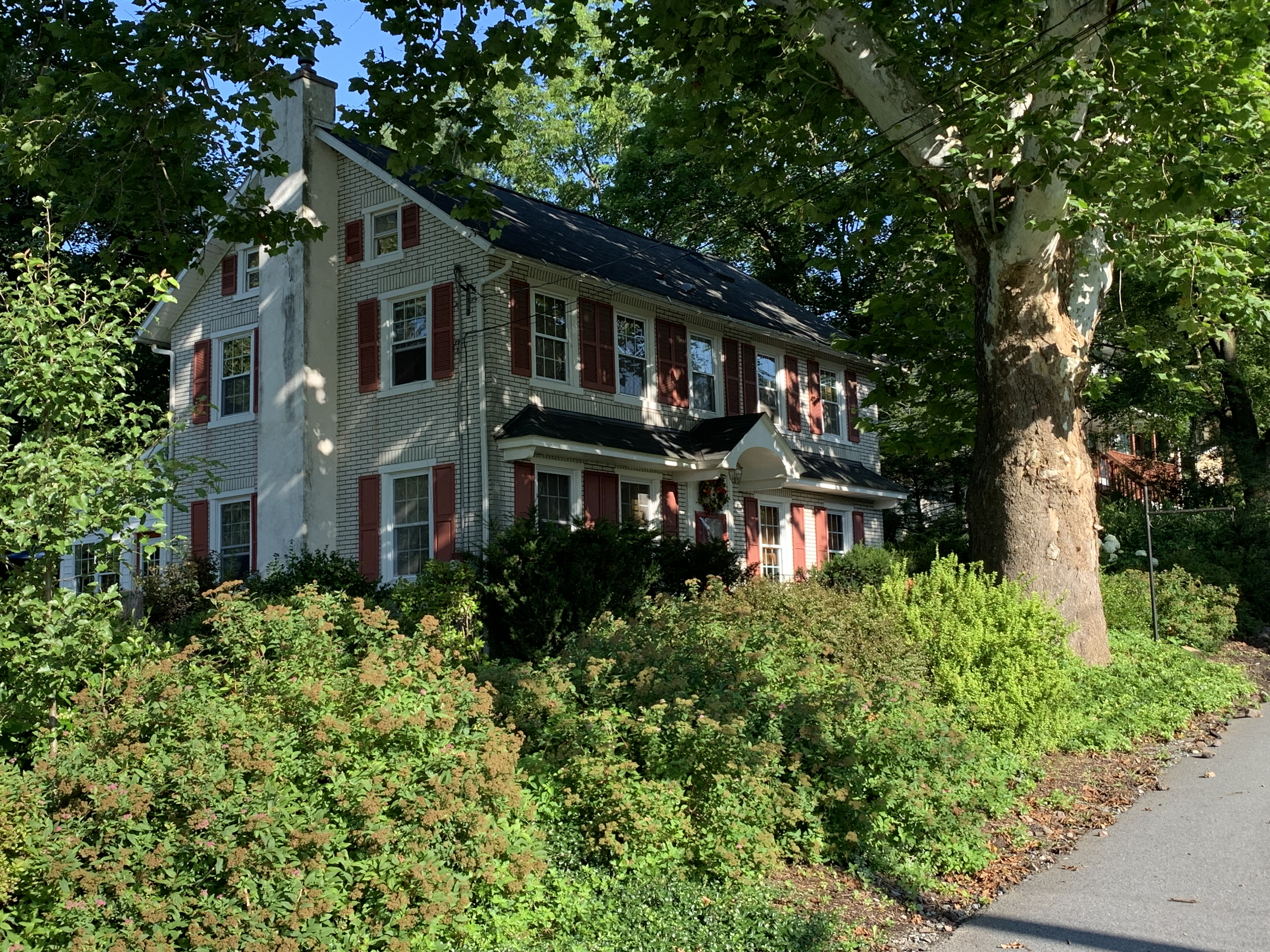
An 1850 Federal-style home

The oldest home still standing is west of the crossroads, built in 1750. The home at the northeast corner of Locust Valley and Gun Club road was built in 1820. Built in 1850, the brick home across from the schoolhouse is built in the more traditional Federal style.

A fieldstone farmhouse was built in 1850 at the corner of Blue Church Road South and Beverly Hills Rd. This home design shows the German design influence with only four-across exterior bays with two rooms on the first floor on the Federal style, which is a symmetrical design with an arch window above door. Originally, this house had a stucco exterior. The third home, on the southwest corner of the T-intersection of Blue Church Rd S and Beverly Hills Rd was constructed in 1880.
