= Lanark, Pennsylvania =

Unincorporated village in Pennsylvania, U.S.

Coordinates: 40°33′06″N 75°25′58″W

Lanark is a small unincorporated village located in Upper Saucon Township in Lehigh County, Pennsylvania. It is part of the Lehigh Valley, the third-largest metropolitan area in Pennsylvania.

Residents of Lanark are served by the Center Valley and Coopersburg Post Offices with ZIP Code of 18034 and 18036, respectively. Lanark is located in Southern Lehigh School District, and students in grades nine through twelve attend Southern Lehigh High School. The community was named after Lanark, Scotland.

Located at the southeastern end of a pass over South Mountain, Lanark is a significant crossroads. Limeport Pike heads south, Vera Cruz Road heads southwest, Saucon Valley Road heads east, and Lanark Road heads southeast. Interstate 78 approaches from the northeast, Pennsylvania Route 309 from the southeast, and meet with Pennsylvania Route 145 in Lanark at a major interchange, all heading northwest over the mountain. This is the southern and eastern end of the I-78/PA 309 concurrency.
