= Zionsville, Pennsylvania =

Unincorporated community in Pennsylvania, US

- Unincorporated community
- Location within Pennsylvania Location within the United States
- Coordinates: 40°28′47″N 75°30′19″W
- Country: United States
- State: Pennsylvania
- County: Lehigh
- Townships: Upper Milford, Lower Milford
- Elevation: 600 ft (180 m)

Population
  - Metro: 865,310 (US: 68th)
- Time zone: UTC-5 (Eastern (EST))
  - Summer (DST): UTC-4 (EDT)
- ZIP Code: 18092
- Area codes: 610 and 484
- Primary airport: Lehigh Valley International Airport
- Major hospital: Lehigh Valley Hospital–Cedar Crest
- School district: East Penn

Zionsville is a village mostly in Upper Milford Township in Lehigh County, Pennsylvania with parts of the village located in Lower Milford Township. The West Branch Hosensack Creek forms its natural southeastern boundary and drains it via the Hosensack Creek to the Perkiomen Creek.

Zionsville is part of the Lehigh Valley, which has a population of 861,899 and is the 68th-most populated metropolitan area in the U.S. as of the 2020 census. Its ZIP Code is 18092.

== History ==
=== Lenape tribes ===
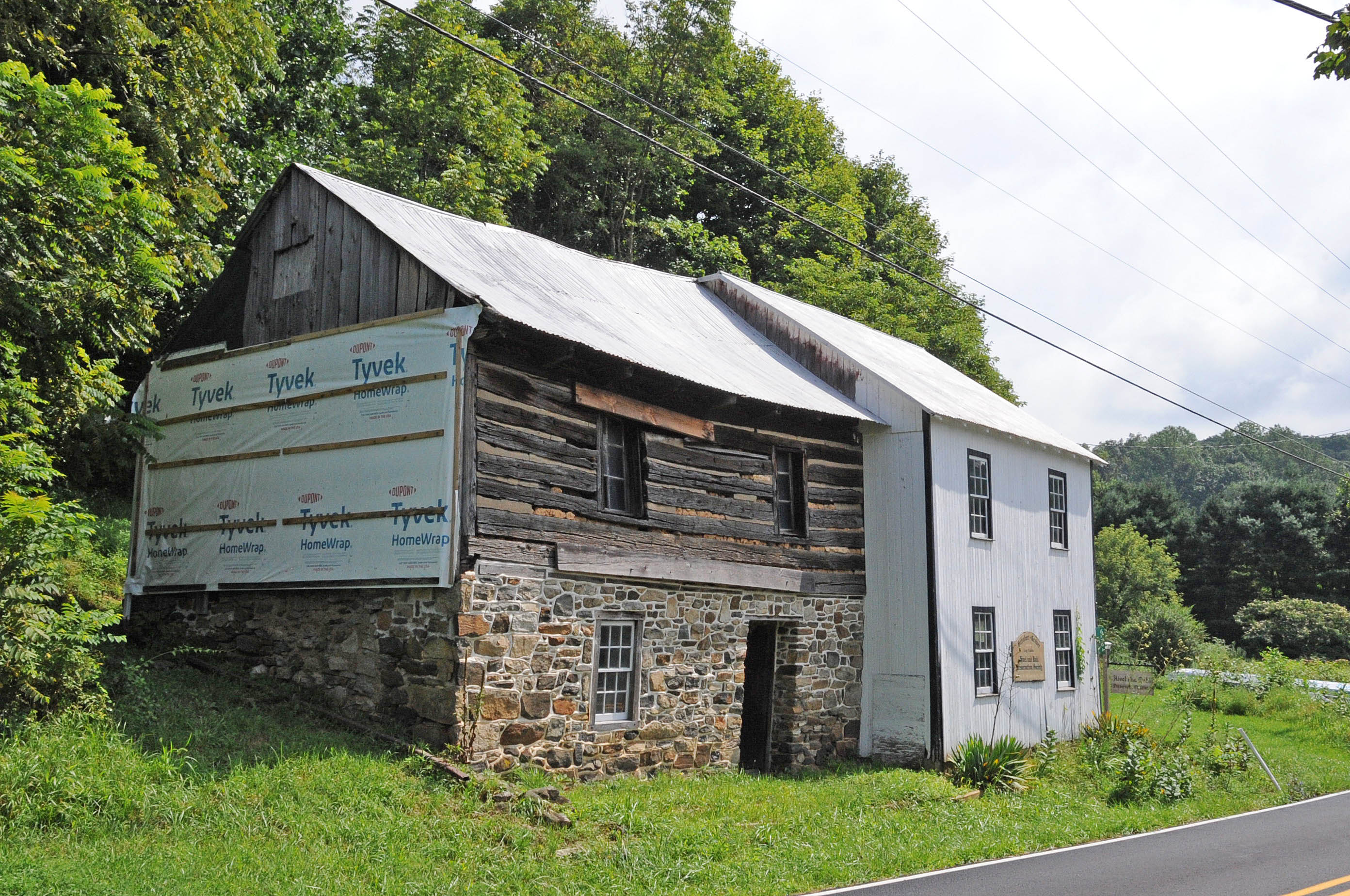
The Schubert-Graber log cabin, constructed in the 1735 in Zionsville in Upper Milford Township, is the township's oldest building structure, August 2020.

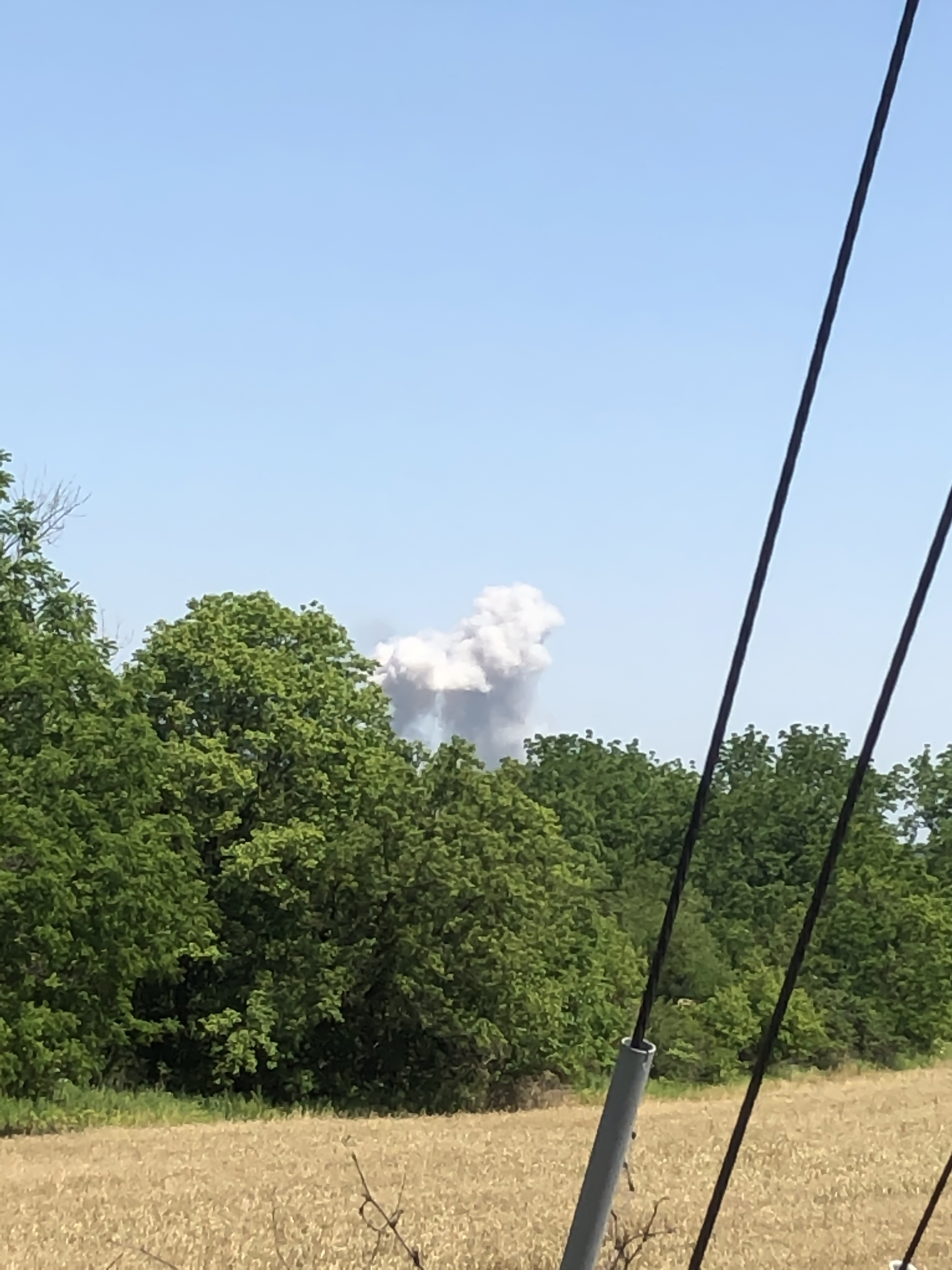
A mushroom cloud visible along PA Route 100 following a June 9, 2020 fireworks explosion in Zionsville left one dead

The area of modern-day Zionsville was once inhabited by the Lenape Indian tribes.

The Lenape tribes were known to live along river fronts or creeks and relied on fertile land around these areas for farming purposes. Due to the extensive and repetitive harvesting and planting of the same land, however, it degraded its quality and eventually was unable to sustain crop growth on these lands. The led them to become largely uninhabitable, and the tribes slowly left the area.

Old Zionsville was founded in 1734 by a group of German settlers on Kings Highway Road, building multiple churches in the region with the oldest being a log cabin built in 1740 which is no longer standing.

Zionsville is home to the historic Dillingersville Union School and Church, first built in 1735.

=== 19th century and 20th centuries ===
Present-day Zionsville was originally part of Old Zionsville until 1876 when Perkiomen Railroad was constructed around a mile southeast of Old Zionsville, leading to the founding of what was then called Zionsville Station. The name was later changed to New Zionsville and then again to its present name of Zionsville.

=== 21st century ===
==== 2009 post office closure ====
In January 2009, the Zionsville Post Office closed after the U.S. Postal Service refused to renew its lease. It served portions of Upper Milford, Lower Milford, and Hereford Township, including the villages of Corning, Dillingersville, Hosensack, Powder Valley, Sigmund, and some Five Points residents.

The residents of the ZIP Code 18092 have since been served by the Hereford Post Office but allowed to maintain the use of "Zionsville, PA 18092" as a legal part of the addresses. Zionsville PO Box customers have been hosted by the Old Zionsville Post Office while packages and certified mail that have to be signed for must be picked up in Hereford.

==== 2020 explosion ====
On June 9, 2020, a shipping container containing modified fireworks accidentally detonated along Orchard Road causing a large mushroom cloud that was visible for miles. The explosion set another shipping container ablaze and caused another explosion, causing fireworks to launch into the air, setting nearby corn fields on fire and damaging property. Firefighters were dispatched, the fire was quickly extinguished, and officials discovered the body of Brian Ehret, the owner of the property.

An investigation into the explosion by state officials and the ATF determined that terrorism was not involved in the explosion, and that Ehret had been modifying fireworks when the trailer caught ablaze and exploded. It is still unknown how the initial fire was started.

== Demographics ==
As of the 2010 census, the population of Zionsville was 3,223. Among the population, 97.1% of the population is white, 0.3% is black, 0.2% is Native American, and 1.1% is Asian. The zip code is in Upper Milford and Lower Milford townships and, to a very small extent, in Hereford Township.

== Industry ==
Lehigh Crane Iron Company once maintained a hematite mine in Zionsville, which was served by the north-to-south Perkiomen Branch of the Reading Railroad. This line remains active north from Pennsuburg to Emmaus as a branch of the East Penn Railroad.

== Climate ==
The climate type is very mild with the summer having high temperatures and humidity, and the winter containing cold to very cold temperatures and an average snowfall of 29.0" inches. According to the Koppen Climate Classification system, Zionsville is within the Humid Subtropical climate.

== Education ==
Zionsville is part of the East Penn School District. Students in grades 9-12 attend Emmaus High School. Students in grades six through eight attend either Eyer Middle School or Lower Macungie Middle School, both located in Macungie. Part of Zionsville, near the village's end in Lower Milford Township, is in the Southern Lehigh School District, where high school students attend Southern Lehigh High School in Center Valley.

== Notable people ==
- Raymond Bryan Dillard, former professor, Westminster Theological Seminary
- Pat Toomey, former U.S. Senator
