= Limeport, Pennsylvania =

Unincorporated community in Pennsylvania, U.S.

Coordinates: 40°30′32″N 75°26′50″W

Limeport is a small unincorporated community on the Saucon Creek in Lower Milford Township and Upper Saucon Township in Lehigh County, Pennsylvania. It is part of the Lehigh Valley, which has a population of 861,899 and is the 68th-most populous metropolitan area in the U.S., as of the 2020 census.

It is served by Limeport Post Office, so village residents use Limeport as their mailing address, and the ZIP Code is 18060.

Limeport is home to Limeport Stadium, a historic baseball stadium, and the Limeport Inn.

== Education ==
Limeport is within the Southern Lehigh School District. Students in grades nine through 12 attend Southern Lehigh High School in Center Valley.
