= Upper Saucon Township, Pennsylvania =

Township in Pennsylvania, US

Upper Saucon Township
- Township
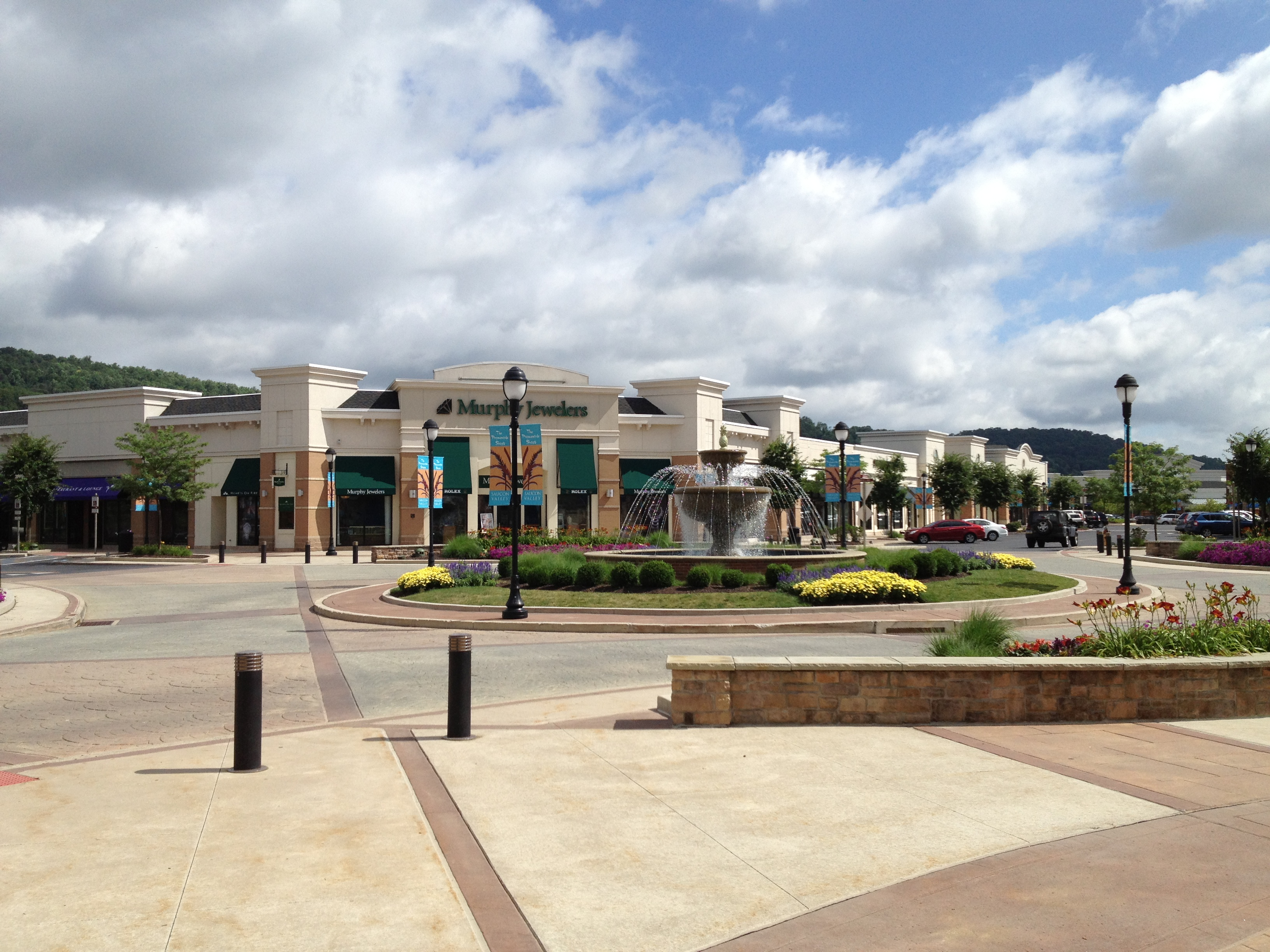
- Promenade Saucon Valley in Upper Saucon Township in July 2013

- Seal

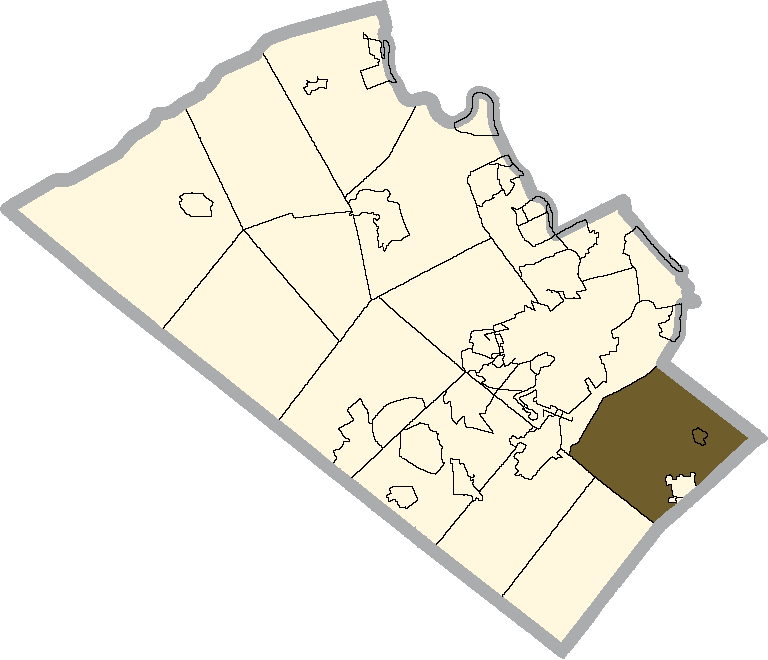
- Location of Upper Saucon Township in Lehigh County, Pennsylvania

- Location of Upper Saucon Township in Pennsylvania Location in the United States
- Coordinates: 40°29′30″N 75°24′59″W
- Country: United States
- State: Pennsylvania
- County: Lehigh

Area
  - Township: 24.61 sq mi (63.74 km^{2})
  - Land: 24.46 sq mi (63.35 km^{2})
  - Water: 0.15 sq mi (0.39 km^{2})
- Elevation: 833 ft (254 m)

Population (2020)
  - Township: 16,973
  - Density: 673.0/sq mi (259.84/km^{2})
  - Metro: 865,310 (US: 68th)
- Time zone: UTC-5 (EST)
  - Summer (DST): UTC-4 (EDT)
- ZIP codes: 18015, mainly 18034 & 18036, 18049, 18060, 18103
- Area code: 610
- FIPS code: 42-077-79288
- Primary airport: Lehigh Valley International Airport
- Major hospital: Lehigh Valley Hospital–Cedar Crest
- School district: Southern Lehigh
- Website: www.uppersaucon.org

Upper Saucon Township is a township in Lehigh County, Pennsylvania, United States. It is part of the Lehigh Valley metropolitan area, which had a population of 861,899 and was the 68th-most populous metropolitan area in the U.S. as of the 2020 census. The township had a population of 16,973 as of the 2020 census.

Upper Saucon Township is located 8.6 miles (13.8 km) southeast of Allentown, 52.5 miles (84.5 km) north of Philadelphia, and 89.5 miles (144.0 km) southwest of New York City.

== History ==
Present-day Upper Saucon Township originally was populated by the Unami people, a division of the indigenous Lenape. The name Saucon comes from the Unami language word Saukunk, meaning "mouth of the creek".

Established in 1743, Upper Saucon was originally part of Bucks County, which was one of the three initial counties established in 1682 by William Penn, founder of the Province of Pennsylvania.

In 1752, Northampton County, including what became Upper Saucon Township, was carved out of Bucks County geographically. In 1812, Lehigh County was carved from Northampton County, and present-day Upper Saucon Township was included in Lehigh County.

== Geography ==
According to the U.S. Census Bureau, the township has a total area of 24.6 square miles (63.7 km^{2}), of which 24.5 square miles (63.4 km^{2}) are land and 0.2 square miles (0.4 km^{2}), or 0.59%, are water. Its boundary with Salisbury Township is located on South Mountain. Elevations range from 340 feet (100 m) in Spring Valley to 1,042 feet (318 m) at Bauer Rock atop South Mountain in Big Rock County Park. Upper Saucon is in the Delaware River watershed and is drained by Saucon Creek into the Lehigh River, except for a very small area in the extreme south just southwest of Locust Valley, which is drained by Unami Creek into Perkiomen Creek and the Schuylkill River.

Upper Saucon Township has a hot summer humid continental climate (Dfa) and is in hardiness zone 6b. The average monthly temperature in Center Valley ranges from 29.5 °F (−1.4 °C) in January to 74.3 °F (23.5 °C) in July.

=== Adjacent municipalities ===
- Lower Milford Township (southwest)
- Upper Milford Township (west)
- Salisbury Township (northwest)
- Lower Saucon Township, Northampton County (northeast)
- Springfield Township, Bucks County (southeast)
- Milford Township, Bucks County (tangent to the south)

Upper Saucon Township surrounds the borough of Coopersburg.

=== Notable villages ===
- Center Valley
- Colesville
- DeSales University
- Friedensville
- Lanark
- Limeport
- Locust Valley
- Spring Valley
- Summit Lawn

== Demographics ==
Historical population
Census	Pop.	Note	%±
2000	11,939		—
2010	14,808		24.0%
2020	16,973		14.6%

As of the census of 2000, there were 11,939 people, 3,970 households, and 3,283 families residing in the township. The population density was 483.9 inhabitants per square mile (186.8/km^{2}). There were 4,117 housing units at an average density of 166.9 units per square mile (64.4 units/km^{2}). The racial makeup of the township was 97.11% White, 0.70% African American, 0.06% Native American, 1.13% Asian, 0.01% Pacific Islander, 0.40% from other races, and 0.59% from two or more races. Hispanic or Latino of any race were 1.07% of the population.

There were 3,970 households, out of which 37.3% had children under the age of 18 living with them, 74.2% were married couples living together, 5.8% had a female householder with no husband present, and 17.3% were non-families. 13.6% of all households were made up of individuals, and 5.6% had someone living alone who was 65 years of age or older. The average household size was 2.79 and the average family size was 3.07.

In the township, the population was spread out, with 24.0% under the age of 18, 11.1% from 18 to 24, 26.1% from 25 to 44, 27.2% from 45 to 64, and 11.7% who were 65 years of age or older. The median age was 39 years. For every 100 females, there were 99.7 males. For every 100 females age 18 and over, there were 97.1 males. The median income for a household in the township was $66,703, and the median income for a family was $73,381. Males had a median income of $50,041 versus $30,165 for females. The per capita income for the township was $27,606. About 0.9% of families and 1.8% of the population were below the poverty line, including 1.6% of those under age 18 and 3.1% of those age 65 or over.

== Education ==
=== Colleges and universities ===
Three colleges and universities are based in Upper Saucon Township: DeSales University, Penn State Lehigh Valley, and Strayer University's Allentown campus.

=== Public education ===
Upper Saucon Township is served by the Southern Lehigh School District. Upper Saucon Township students in grades nine through 12 attend Southern Lehigh High School in the district.

== Recreation ==
Upper Saucon Township Community Park was dedicated on May 18, 1996, and was designed to meet the current and future recreational needs of the Township's residents. The park covers approximately 70 acres and is conveniently located in the central portion of the Township.

== Economy ==
In 2006, Olympus Corporation opened its U.S. headquarters in the township.

== Board of Supervisors ==
Upper Saucon is a second-class township and elects five at-large supervisors.

United States presidential election results for Upper Saucon Township, Pennsylvania
Year	Republican		Democratic		Third party(ies)	
Year	No.	%	No.	%	No.	%
2024	5,656	50.33%	5,466	48.64%	115	1.02%
2020	5,282	50.63%	5,051	48.41%	100	0.96%
2016	4,503	53.40%	3,588	42.55%	342	4.06%
2012	4,130	57.31%	3,002	41.66%	74	1.03%
2008	3,796	52.34%	3,387	46.70%	69	0.95%
2004	3,686	56.59%	2,804	43.05%	24	0.37%

== Transportation ==
=== Roads and highways ===
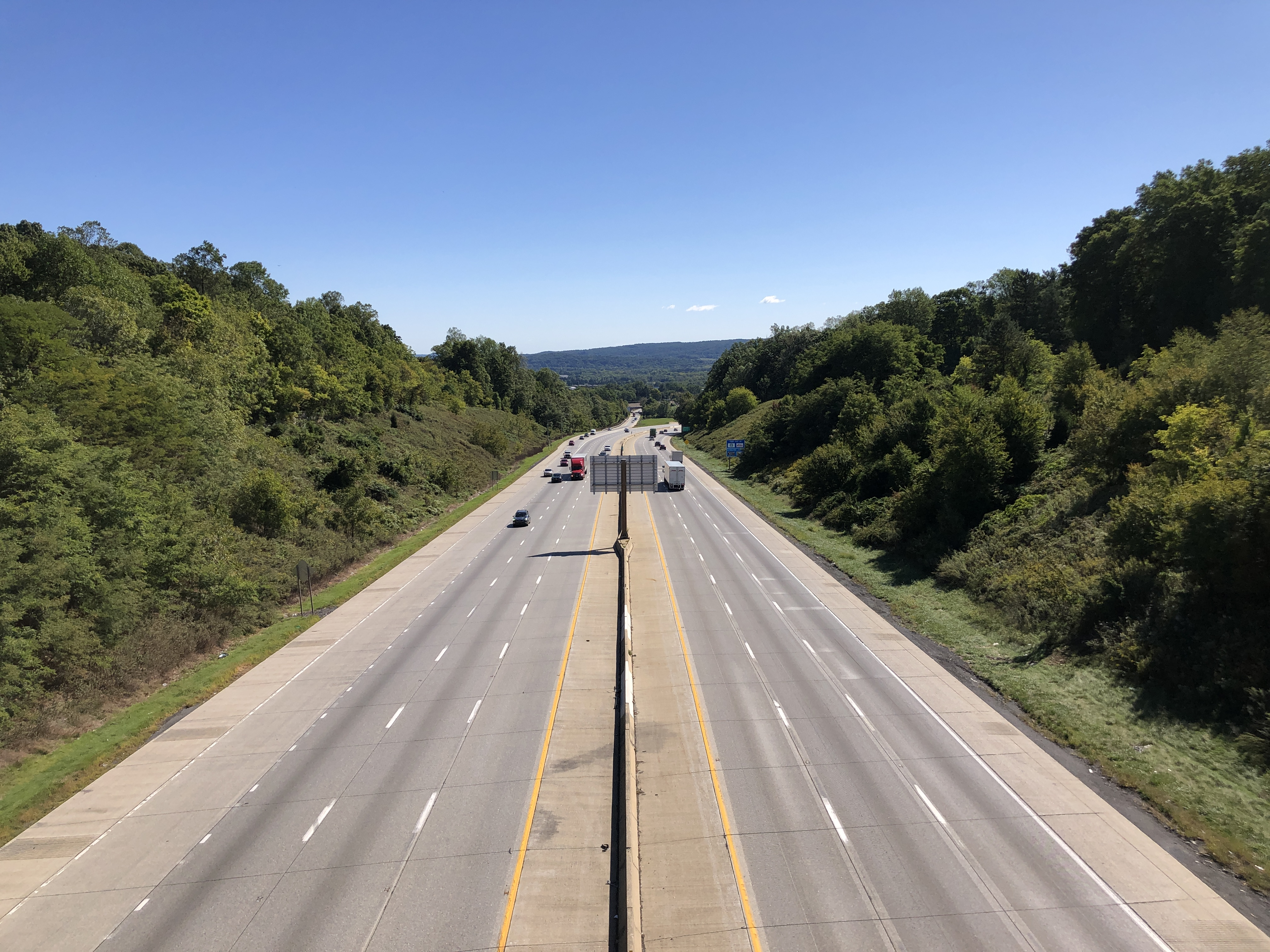
I-78 East and PA Route 309 South in Upper Saucon Township

As of 2022, there were 131.43 miles (211.52 km) of public roads in Upper Saucon Township, of which 50.61 miles (81.45 km) were maintained by the Pennsylvania Department of Transportation (PennDOT) and 80.82 miles (130.07 km) were maintained by the township.

Upper Saucon has three north-to-south numbered routes: Pennsylvania Route 309, Pennsylvania Route 145, and Pennsylvania Route 378.

=== Public transportation ===
LANta Route 323 serves Upper Saucon to and from Allentown.

== Notable people ==
- Constantine Jacob Erdman, Democratic member of the U.S. House of Representatives from Pennsylvania
- Joseph Fry Jr., former U.S. Congressman
- Mike Portnoy, progressive metal drummer
