= Lower Milford Township, Pennsylvania =

Township in Pennsylvania, US

Lower Milford Township
- Township
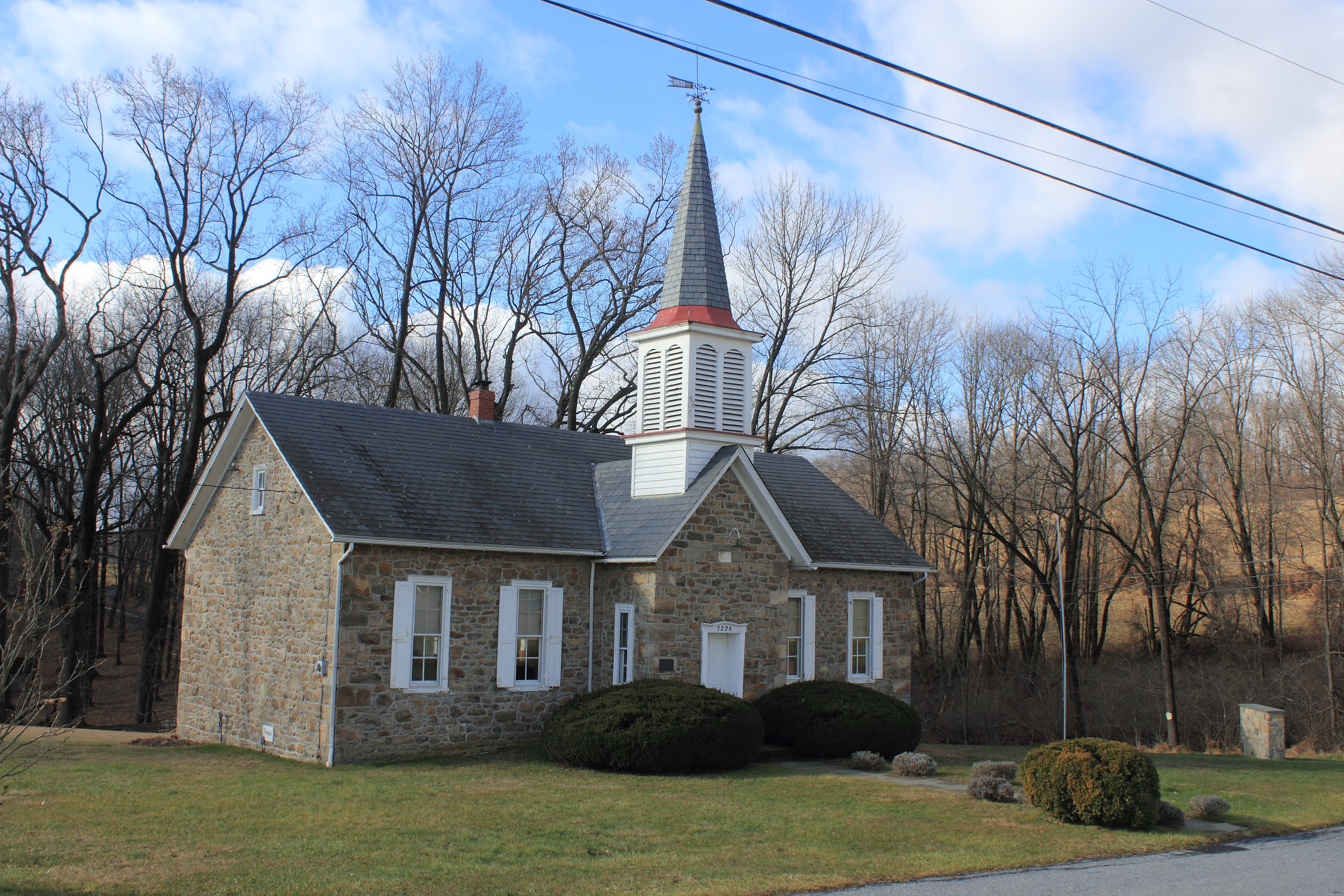
- Dillingersville Union School and Church in Lower Milford Township in December 2012

- Seal

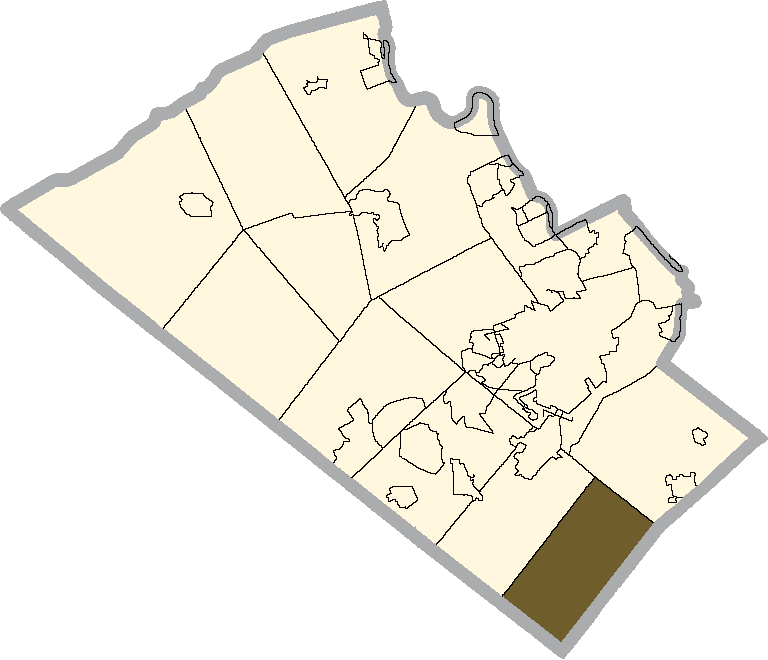
- Location of Lower Milford Township in Lehigh County, Pennsylvania

- Location of Lower Milford Township in Pennsylvania Location in the United States
- Coordinates: 40°30′30″N 75°27′29″W
- Country: United States
- County: Lehigh

Area
  - Township: 19.72 sq mi (51.07 km^{2})
  - Land: 19.70 sq mi (51.01 km^{2})
  - Water: 0.023 sq mi (0.06 km^{2})
- Elevation: 650 ft (200 m)

Population (2010)
  - Township: 3,775
  - Estimate (2016): 3,915
  - Density: 198.8/sq mi (76.75/km^{2})
  - Metro: 865,310 (US: 68th)
- Time zone: UTC-5 (EST)
  - Summer (DST): UTC-4 (EDT)
- ZIP codes: 18036, 18041, 18049, 18060, 18092, 18951
- Area codes: 610
- FIPS code: 42-077-44992
- GNIS feature ID: 1216690
- Primary airport: Lehigh Valley International Airport
- Major hospital: Lehigh Valley Hospital–Cedar Crest
- School district: Southern Lehigh
- Website: www.lowermilford.org

Lower Milford Township is a township in Lehigh County, Pennsylvania, United States. The population of Lower Milford Township was 3,775 at the 2010 census. It is a suburb of Allentown in the Lehigh Valley region of eastern Pennsylvania.

== History ==
Dillingersville Union School and Church in Lower Milford Township, built in 1885, was added to the National Register of Historic Places in 1978.

== Geography ==
Lower Milford is the southernmost township in Lehigh County. It includes six villages: Corning (in Upper Milford Township), Dillingersville, Hosensack, Kraussdale, Limeport (in Upper Saucon Township) and Zionsville. According to the U.S. Census Bureau, the township has a total area of 19.7 square miles (51.1 km^{2}), of which 0.023 square miles (0.06 km^{2}), or 0.12%, are water. It is located in the Delaware River watershed. Saucon Creek begins in Lower Milford and drains part of it north into the Lehigh River. Lower Milford is also the source of three tributary creeks of Perkiomen Creek, which drains south to the Schuylkill River: Hosensack Creek (which starts near the source of the Saucon), Unami Creek, and Macoby Creek. The majority of the township is hilly and is located in the South Mountains and on Mill Hill to the south and east of the Hosensack Valley.

Lower Milford Township has a hot-summer humid continental climate (Dfa) and is in hardiness zone 6b. The average monthly temperature in Dillingersville ranges from 28.5 °F (−1.9 °C) in January to 72.7 °F (22.6 °C) in July.

=== Adjacent municipalities ===
- Upper Milford Township (northwest)
- Upper Saucon Township (northeast)
- Springfield Township (tangent to the east)
- Milford Township (southeast)
- Upper Hanover Township (southwest)
- Hereford Township (tangent to the west)

== Transportation ==
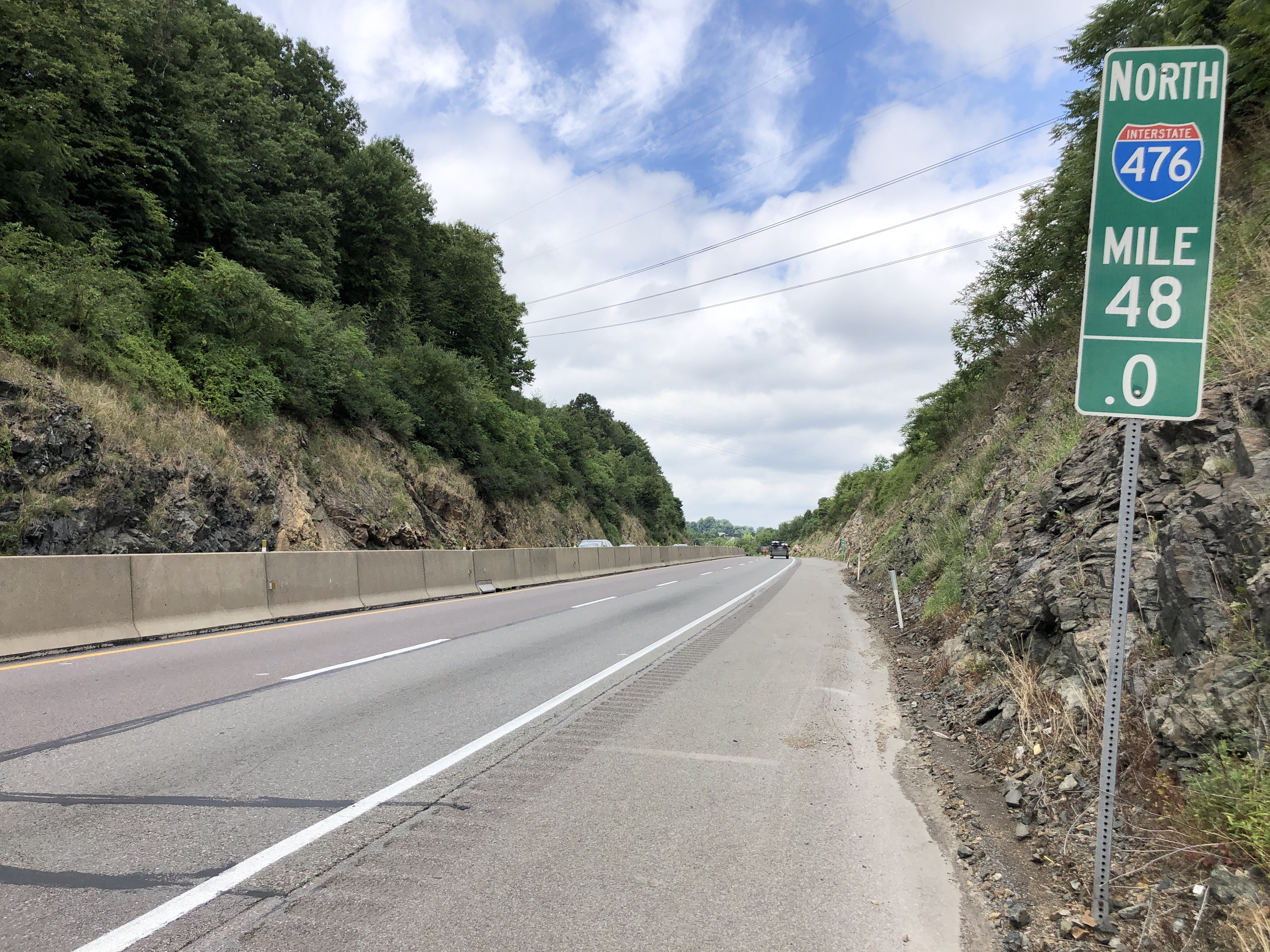
I-476, the Northeast Extension of the Pennsylvania Turnpike, in Lower Milford Township

As of 2022, there were 73.87 miles (118.88 km) of public roads in Lower Milford Township, of which 3.30 miles (5.31 km) were maintained by the Pennsylvania Turnpike Commission (PTC), 21.06 miles (33.89 km) were maintained by the Pennsylvania Department of Transportation (PennDOT) and 49.51 miles (79.68 km) were maintained by the township.

Interstate 476 follows the Pennsylvania Turnpike's Northeast Extension through the northern and eastern parts of Lower Milford Township on a southeast–northwest alignment. However, the nearest interchange is in neighboring Milford Township in Bucks County. No other numbered highways serve the township. Main thoroughfares include Church View Road, Kings Highway, Limeport Pike, Palm Road, Spinnerstown Road, Steinsburg Road, and Zionsville Road.

== Demographics ==
Historical population
Census	Pop.	Note	%±
2000	3,617		—
2010	3,775		4.4%
2016 (est.)	3,915		3.7%
U.S. Decennial Census

As of the 2000 census, there were 3,617 people, 1,277 households, and 1,039 families residing in the township. The population density was 184.1 inhabitants per square mile (71.1/km^{2}). There were 1,308 housing units at an average density of 66.6 units per square mile (25.7 units/km^{2}). The racial makeup of the township was 98.09% White, 0.17% African American, 0.25% Native American, 0.55% Asian, 0.11% from other races, and 0.83% from two or more races. Hispanic or Latino of any race were 0.69% of the population.

There were 1,277 households, out of which 35.5% had children under the age of 18 living with them, 71.6% were married couples living together, 6.0% had a female householder with no husband present, and 18.6% were non-families. 13.2% of all households were made up of individuals, and 4.7% had someone living alone who was 65 years of age or older. The average household size was 2.83 and the average family size was 3.12.

In the township, the population was spread out, with 25.1% under the age of 18, 5.9% from 18 to 24, 29.2% from 25 to 44, 28.4% from 45 to 64, and 11.5% who were 65 years of age or older. The median age was 40 years. For every 100 females there were 102.2 males. For every 100 females age 18 and over, there were 101.2 males. The median income for a household in the township was $67,008, and the median income for a family was $75,409. Males had a median income of $42,149 versus $26,000 for females. The per capita income for the township was $27,572. About 2.1% of families and 2.8% of the population were below the poverty line, including 1.3% of those under age 18 and 7.8% of those age 65 or over.

United States presidential election results for Lower Milford Township, Pennsylvania
Year	Republican		Democratic		Third party(ies)	
Year	No.	%	No.	%	No.	%
2024	1,590	61.46%	982	37.96%	15	0.58%
2020	1,563	61.56%	946	37.26%	30	1.18%
2016	1,366	61.45%	764	34.37%	93	4.18%
2012	1,236	61.83%	727	36.37%	36	1.80%
2008	1,137	55.71%	879	43.07%	25	1.22%
2004	1,157	59.49%	780	40.10%	8	0.41%

== Public education ==
In addition to Coopersburg and Upper Saucon Township, Lower Milford is served by the Southern Lehigh School District. The district's schools include Hopewell Elementary School and Liberty Bell Elementary School for grades K–3, Joseph P. Liberati Intermediate School for grades 4–6, Southern Lehigh Middle School for grades 7–8, and Southern Lehigh High School in Center Valley for grades 9–12.
