= Jimmie Schaffer =

American baseball player (born 1936)

- Catcher
- Born: April 5, 1936 (age 90); Limeport, Pennsylvania, U.S.
- Batted: Right Threw: Right

MLB debut
- May 20, 1961, for the St. Louis Cardinals

Last MLB appearance
- July 11, 1968, for the Cincinnati Reds

MLB statistics
- Batting average: .223
- Home runs: 11
- Runs batted in: 56
- Stats at Baseball Reference

Teams
- As player: St. Louis Cardinals (1961–1962); Chicago Cubs (1963–1964); Chicago White Sox (1965); New York Mets (1965); Philadelphia Phillies (1966–1967); Cincinnati Reds (1968); As coach: Texas Rangers (1978); Kansas City Royals (1980–1988)

Career highlights and awards
- World Series champion (1985)

Jimmie Ronald Schaffer (born April 5, 1936) is an American former Major League Baseball catcher who played for the St. Louis Cardinals, Chicago Cubs, New York Mets, Philadelphia Phillies, and Cincinnati Reds, all of the National League, and the Chicago White Sox of the American League, between 1961 and 1968.

== Early life and education ==
Schaffer was born in Limeport, Pennsylvania, and attended Coopersburg High School in Coopersburg, Pennsylvania, where he graduated in 1954.

== Major League Baseball ==
=== Playing career ===
Schaffer signed as an amateur free agent by the St. Louis Cardinals in 1955 and spent six seasons in the minor leagues before making his major league debut at age 25 on May 20, 1961. In that game, he started at catcher and batted eighth for the Cardinals, and in his first major league at bat, he recorded his first career major league hit, a third-inning single off the Cubs' Dick Ellsworth in a 1–0 loss.

In his major league career, Schaffer played in 304 games with 11 home runs, 56 runs batted in and a .223 batting average.

=== Coaching career ===
Schaffer also managed in the Baltimore Orioles' farm system, spent one season (1978) as the bullpen coach of the Texas Rangers, and played a similar role for the Kansas City Royals from 1980 to 1988, serving on the Royals' 1980 and 1985 world champion coaching staffs.

After retiring from coaching professional baseball in 1989, Schaffer returned to his hometown of Limeport, Pennsylvania. He and his wife Jeanne have five adult children and a 12-year-old grandson.
