= Noel LaMontagne =

American football player (born 1977)

No. 79
- Position: Guard

Personal information
- Born: March 9, 1977 (age 49); Bethlehem, Pennsylvania, U.S.
- Listed height: 6 ft 4 in (1.93 m)
- Listed weight: 301 lb (137 kg)

Career information
- High school: Southern Lehigh (Center Valley, Pennsylvania)
- College: Virginia
- NFL draft: 2000: undrafted

Career history
- Cleveland Browns (2000–2001)

Awards and highlights
- First-team All-American (1999); 2× First-team All-ACC (1998, 1999); Virginia Cavaliers Jersey No. 77 retired

Career NFL statistics
- Games played: 2
- Stats at Pro Football Reference

Noel Michael LaMontagne (born March 9, 1977) is an American former professional football player who was an offensive guard for the Cleveland Browns of the National Football League (NFL). He played college football for the Virginia Cavaliers. He signed with Cleveland as an undrafted free agent following the 2000 NFL draft and played for the Browns in 2000.

== Early life and college ==
LaMontagne was born in Bethlehem, Pennsylvania, and grew up in nearby Coopersburg, Pennsylvania. He attended and graduated from Southern Lehigh High School in Center Valley, Pennsylvania, where he graduated in 1995.

He attended the University of Virginia, where he redshirted one season and then played left guard for the Cavaliers from 1996 to 1999. He was a three-time first-team All-Atlantic Coast Conference honoree in 1997, 1998, and 1999.

== Professional career ==
LaMontagne appeared in two games for the Cleveland Browns in the 2000 season. Due to knee surgery, he was placed on injured reserve for much of that season. After twisting his knee during a minicamp in March 2001, LaMontagne had two more surgeries.

The Browns released LaMontagne on July 20, 2001, days before the 2001 season training camp was to begin.

== Post-NFL career ==
In the fall of 2001, LaMontagne returned to Southern Lehigh High School, where he volunteered as an assistant coach. He retired from football and became a sports agent.
