= Poag and McEwen =

American real estate investment firm

- Founded: 1989
- Key people: Dan Poag (co-founder); Terry McEwen (co-founder)
- Website: poagshoppingcenters.com

Poag and McEwen develops, manages, and leases lifestyle centers in the United States. They are recognized as one of the co-founders of the concept of lifestyle centers. The company was founded in 1989 and is headquartered in Memphis, Tennessee.

== History ==
Poag and McEwen was established in Memphis in 1989 by Dan Poag and Terry McEwen.

Poag envisioned an open-air shopping center that combined specialty stores and restaurants. His idea became The Shops of Saddle Creek in Germantown, which opened in 1987.

In 2022, under the leadership of Dan’s son Josh Poag, the company rebranded as Poag Development Group and partnered with JLL to manage the leasing and operation of the Poag portfolio.

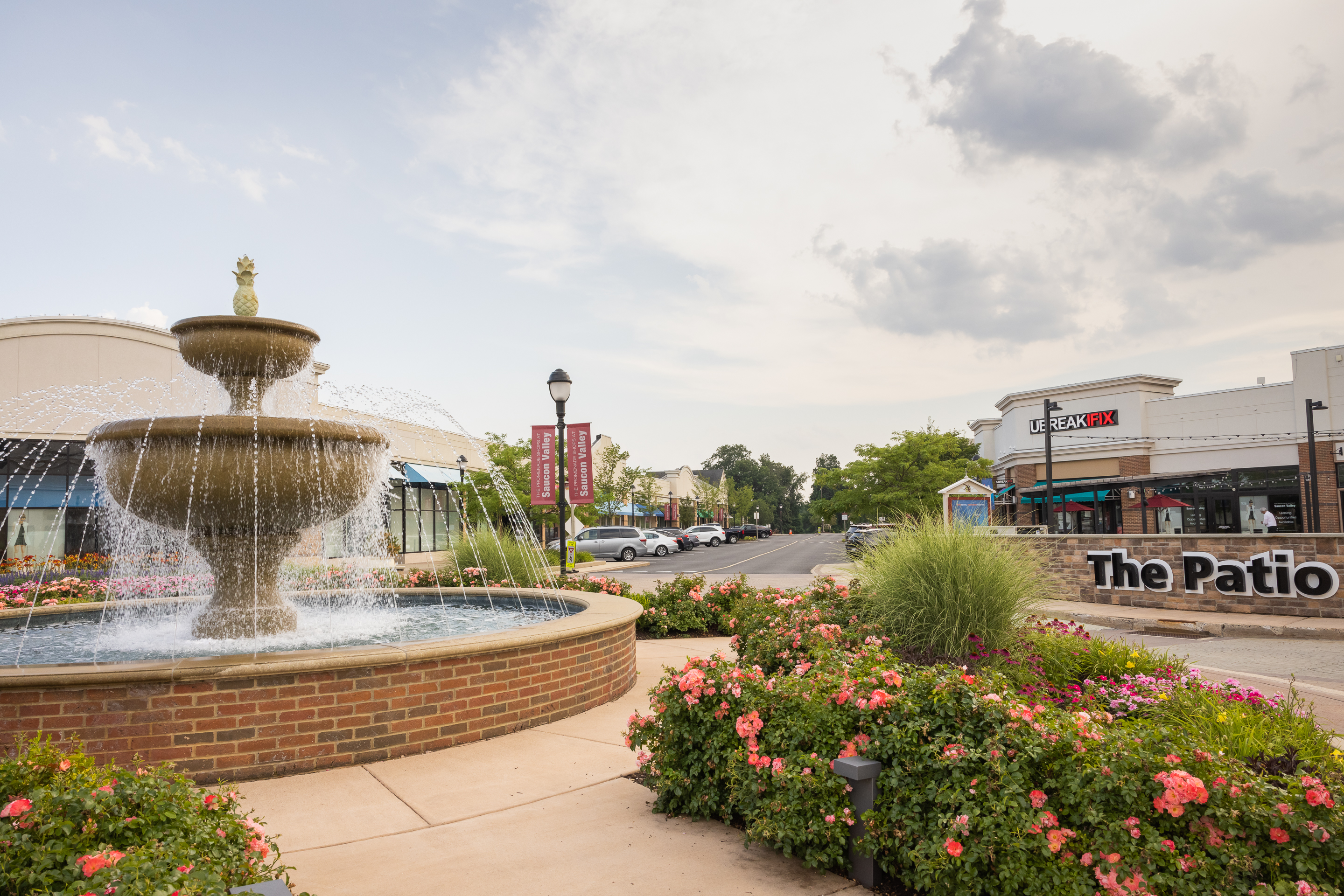
Promenade Saucon Valley in Center Valley, Pennsylvania, one of ten Poag and McEwen lifestyle centers

== Existing developments ==
- Aspen Grove, Littleton, Colorado
- Deer Park Town Center, Deer Park, Illinois
- One Pacific Place, Omaha, Nebraska
- The Promenade Shops at Briargate, Colorado Springs, Colorado
- The Promenade Shops at Centerra, Loveland, Colorado
- The Promenade Shops at Dos Lagos, Corona, California
- The Promenade Shops at Evergreen Walk, South Windsor, Connecticut
- Promenade Saucon Valley, Center Valley, Pennsylvania (Lehigh Valley)
- The Shops at Perry Crossing, Plainfield, Indiana
- Town Center Plaza, Leawood, Kansas

== Developments under construction ==
- Highland Row, Memphis, Tennessee
- The Promenade Shops at Orchard Valley, Manteca, California
- The Promenade Shops at The Spectrum, Pearland, Texas
