= Corning, Pennsylvania =

Village in Pennsylvania, US

- Village
- Interactive map of Corning, Pennsylvania
- Coordinates: 40°27′5.35″N 75°31′49.66″W
- Country: United States
- State: Pennsylvania

Population
  - Total: 1,597
- Time zone: CST
  - Summer (DST): CDT
- ZIP code: 18092
- Area code: 215
- GNIS feature ID: 1203339

Corning is a village in far southern Lehigh County, Pennsylvania, United States, located in both Upper Milford and Lower Milford Townships. It borders Berks and Montgomery Counties.

The village is served by the Zionsville ZIP Code of 18092 and is in the Pennsburg telephone exchange with the area code of 215. It is in the watershed of the Perkiomen Creek and its roads are Corning Road, Palm Road, William Street, which becomes Pine Tree Road in Berks County, and Yeakel Road. It is on the Perkiomen Branch, which provides a rail connection between the Upper Perkiomen Valley and Allentown.
