= Promenade Saucon Valley =

Coordinates: 40.5597°N 75.4114°W

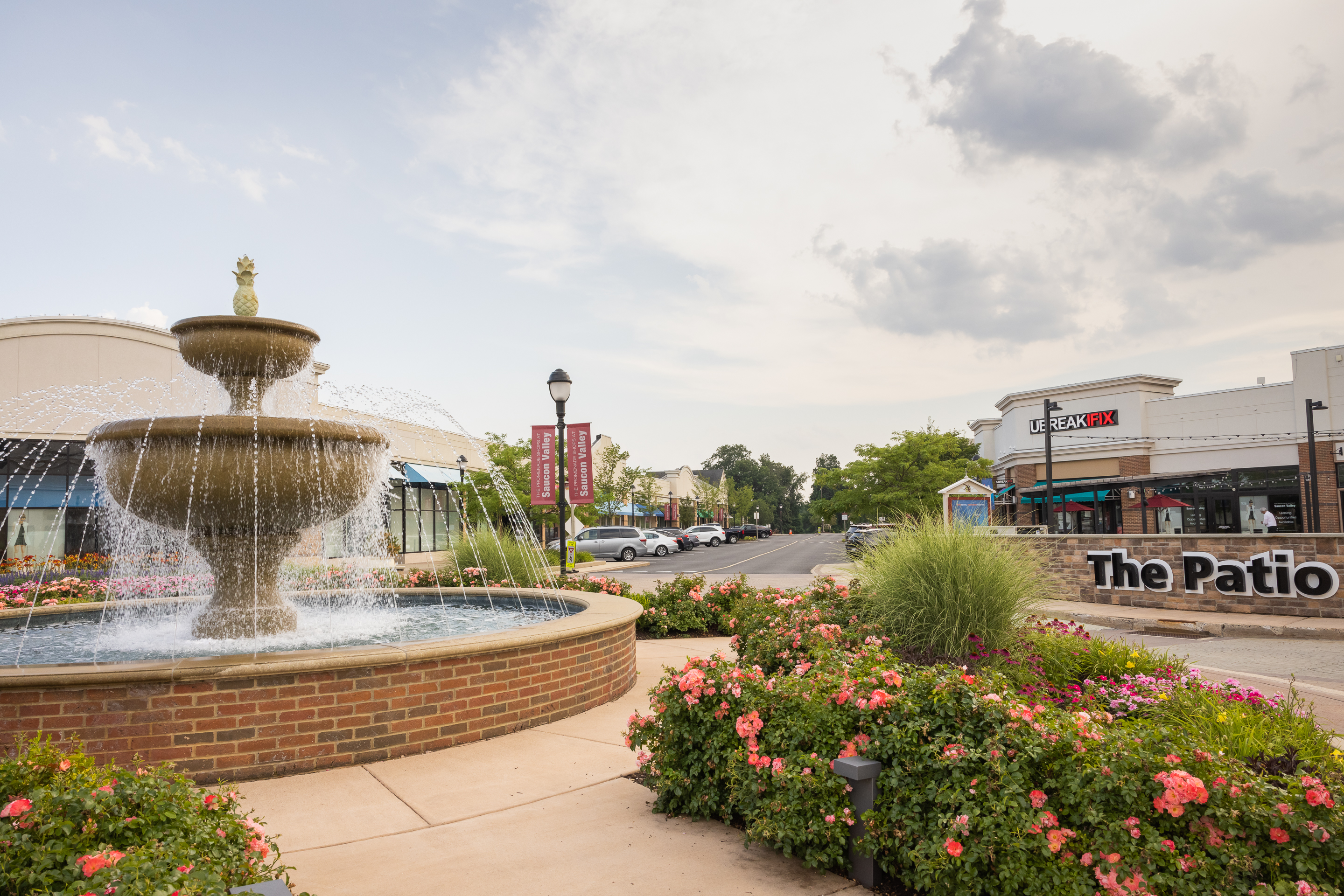
- The Promenade Saucon Valley in Center Valley, Pennsylvania, July 2021
- Location: Center Valley, Pennsylvania, U.S.
- Opened: October 27, 2006
- Developer: Poag and McEwen
- Manager: Centennial Advisory Services and MSC
- Num. of stores: 55
- Floor area: 475,000 square feet (44,100 m^{2})
- Parking: Parking lot
- Public transit: LANta bus: 323
- Website: Promenade Saucon Valley

Promenade Saucon Valley (formerly The Promenade Shops at Saucon Valley) is a lifestyle center that is located in Center Valley, Pennsylvania. Major stores include American Eagle Outfitters, Banana Republic, Barnes & Noble, Brooks Brothers, Fresh Market, Old Navy, and AMC Theatres with sixteen screens, including an IMAX theater.

== History ==
The lifestyle center opened on October 27, 2006 at a cost of $125 million. A parade was held to celebrate the center's opening. The Promenade is home to the first L.L.Bean outfitter in Pennsylvania. In January 2020, the center lost several stores, increasing its vacancy to eighteen percent. Several more stores closed during the Promenade's March 17, 2020 to June 5, 2020 COVID-19 pandemic shutdown, increasing vacancy to twenty-five percent. Centennial Advisory Services and MSC took over leasing and management of The Promenade Shops at Saucon Valley in April 2022.

The Promenade Shops at Saucon Valley was renamed Promenade Saucon Valley in April 2024 due to the repositioning of the center and tenant changes.
