= Harvey E. Jordan =

American medical academic and eugenicist

- Born: 1878; Coopersburg, Pennsylvania
- Died: 1963 (aged 84–85)
- Education: Lehigh University; Princeton University
- Occupations: Professor of Anatomy; Former dean of the University of Virginia School of Medicine

Harvey Ernest Jordan (August 14, 1878 - December 21, 1963) was a professor of anatomy and dean of the University of Virginia School of Medicine.

Harvey Jordan was born in Coopersburg, Pennsylvania to Genaah and Emma Jordan. Jordan earned his bachelor's and master's degrees from Lehigh University, and his doctorate from Princeton University. He joined the faculty at UVA in 1907. He became Dean of the School of Medicine in 1939. Jordan was president of the American Genetic Association and the Virginia Academy of Science, which awarded him its Science Research Prize in 1931. He was well recognized for his research in histology and embryology, and published several textbooks on histology.

Eugenics was lauded as an innovative solution to future health problems in the early 1900s, and Jordan was a known proponent of eugenics. The Virginia Advocate notes that "In the 1920s, hundreds of universities across the country taught eugenics as groundwork for social policy [and the] University of Virginia was known as one of the leading southern institutions in eugenics education" due to the work of Dr. Jordan.

Jordan died in 1963 and is buried in the University of Virginia Cemetery.

In 1972, UVA dedicated Jordan Hall, the largest research building in the School of Medicine, in his honor. However, due to the possible controversy over his connection to the study of eugenics, the university renamed the building 45 years later in 2017.
