= Colesville, Pennsylvania =

Village in Pennsylvania, U.S.

Coordinates: 40°34′19″N 75°23′33″W

Colesville is a suburban village located on Route 378 in Upper Saucon Township in Lehigh County and Lower Saucon Township in Northampton County, Pennsylvania. Colesville is part of the Lehigh Valley, which had a population of 861,899 and was the 68th-most populous metropolitan area in the U.S. as of the 2020 census.

The village is located on the south side of Lehigh Mountain from Bethlehem. Interstate 78 passes through the village but does not interchange there. Colesville is split between the Bethlehem Zip Code of 18015 and the Center Valley Zip Code of 18034.
