= Raymond B. Dillard =

American biblical scholar, theologian, and academic (1944–1993)

- Born: January 7, 1944; Louisville, Kentucky, U.S.
- Died: October 1, 1993 (aged 49); Zionsville, Pennsylvania, U.S.
- Education: Bob Jones University (B.A., 1966); Westminster Theological Seminary (B.D., 1969); Dropsie University (Ph.D., 1975)
- Occupation: Old Testament scholar
- Organization(s): Evangelical Theological Society, Society of Biblical Literature, Institute for Biblical Research
- Notable work: 2 Chronicles (commentary); An Introduction to the Old Testament
- Spouse: Ann Dillard née Albrecht (1966–1993)
- Children: 3

Raymond Bryan Dillard (January 7, 1944 – October 1, 1993) was a professor of Old Testament language and literature at Westminster Theological Seminary.

== Life ==
Dillard was born on January 7, 1944, in Louisville, Kentucky, the son of Raymond and Ruth Dillard. After graduating from high school in Fayetteville, North Carolina, in 1962, he went to study at Bob Jones University (B.A. 1966), Westminster Theological Seminary (B.D. 1969), and Dropsie University (Ph.D. 1975). He did postdoctoral research at Temple University, the University of Pennsylvania, and Tel Aviv University. He taught at Westminster Theological Seminary as professor of Old Testament language and literature from 1971 until his death in 1993.

Dillard was a member of the Society of Biblical Literature, where he worked in the Chronicles-Ezra-Nehemia section. He also held memberships in the Evangelical Theological Society and in the Institute for Biblical Research.

Among his major academic publications were an extensive commentary on 2 Chronicles published as part of the Word Biblical Commentary (Dillard 1988), a commentary on the Book of Joel (Dillard 1992), and his magnum opus, An Introduction to the Old Testament, which he wrote together with Tremper Longman and which was published posthumously, three months after his death (Dillard & Longman 1994).

To his students and colleagues, he was known as a "master of classroom drama" who "captivated mind and hearts".

Dillard died of a heart attack on October 1, 1993, in the woods near Zionsville, Pennsylvania.

== Publications ==
=== Books and book chapters ===
- Dillard, Raymond B. (1988). Hubbard, David A.; et al. (eds.). 2 Chronicles. Word Biblical Commentary. Vol. 15. Waco, TX: Word Books. ISBN 978-0-8499-0214-7. LCCN 81071768. OCLC 60003929.
- Dillard, Raymond B. (1992). "Joel". In McComiskey, Thomas Edward (ed.). The Minor Prophets: An Exegetical and Expository Commentary. Grand Rapids, MI: Baker Academic. pp. 239–314. ISBN 978-0-8010-3631-6. LCCN 91038388. OCLC 245555704.
- Dillard, Raymond B.; Longman, Tremper (January 1994). An Introduction to the Old Testament (PDF). Grand Rapids, MI: Zondervan. ISBN 978-0-310-43250-0. LCCN 2006005249. OCLC 31046001. Archived from the original (PDF, 3.5 MB) on 2012-08-03.
- Dillard, Raymond B. (May 1999). Faith in the Face of Apostasy: The Gospel According to Elijah and Elisha. Phillipsburg, NJ: P & R Publishing. ISBN 978-0-87552-650-8. LCCN 99028026. OCLC 41143043.

=== Articles ===
- Dillard, Raymond B. (September 1980). "The Reign Of Asa (2 Chronicles 14-16): An Example of the Chronicler's Theological Method" (PDF, 0.9 MB). JETS. 23 (3): 207–218. ISSN 0360-8808.
- Dillard, Raymond B. (Spring 1981). "The Chronicler's Solomon". WTJ. 43 (2): 289–300. ISSN 0043-4388.
- Dillard, Raymond B. (Spring 1984). "Reward and Punishment in Chronicles: The Theology of Immediate Retribution". WTJ. 46 (1): 164–172. ISSN 0043-4388.
- Dillard, Raymond B. (Spring 1986). "The Chronicler's Jehoshaphat". Trinity Journal. 7 (1): 17–22. ISSN 0360-3032.

=== Audio ===
- Dillard, Raymond B. (January 1980). Sinful Census — 2 Samuel 24 (chapel message recording, 39:34 min). Westminster Theological Seminary.
- Dillard, Raymond B. (May 1983). Marriage in the Old Testament — Ezekiel 24:15-27 (chapel message recording, 23:56 min). Westminster Theological Seminary.
- Dillard, Raymond B. (2000). Raymond B. Dillard Collection (9 audio CDs). Westminster Theological Seminary.
