= Powder Valley, Pennsylvania =

Unincorporated community in Pennsylvania, US

Powder Valley Pulwerdaal
- Village
- Location within Pennsylvania Location within the United States
- Coordinates: 40°27′58″N 75°31′28″W
- Country: United States
- State: Pennsylvania
- County: Lehigh
- Elevation: 673 ft (205 m)

Population
  - Metro: 865,310 (US: 68th)
- Time zone: UTC-5 (Eastern (EST))
  - Summer (DST): UTC-4 (EDT)
- Primary airport: Lehigh Valley International Airport
- Major hospital: Lehigh Valley Hospital–Cedar Crest
- School district: East Penn

Powder Valley (Pennsylvania German: Pulwerdaal) is a village in southern Upper Milford Township in Lehigh County, Pennsylvania. Powder Valley is part of the Lehigh Valley, which has a population of 861,899 and is the 68th-most populous metropolitan area in the U.S. as of the 2020 census.

It is located on the Indian Creek, which rises in the northwest, turns south, and flows through a gorge starting there into the Hosensack Creek, a tributary of Perkiomen Creek. The village uses the Zionsville Zip Code of 18092.

== History ==
Powder Valley initially began as a settlement of a couple houses as German settlers began moving en masse to the general area. Powder Valley got its name from a gunpowder mill started by Henry Kemmerer in 1829, before being sold to Harry Schell and Henry Trump, with little success. The original mill exploded sometime around 1830, and the pair never rebuilt. Henry Kemmerer built another mill close by, operating for another 3 years. On January 13, 1834, the powder mill exploded, with two workers, Adam G. Fälker, and Lewis Reiter, being involved. Fälker died of his injuries, and Reiter was severely burned.

A mining company existed in Powder Valley, called the Indian Creek Mining Company. It is unknown how long they existed or what specifically they mined, however it is known they existed prior to 1852 as the oldest record known is a property sale record from the Indian Creek Mining Company to Solomon Moyer. Additionally, they are listed on a parcel map from 1862 of Lehigh County.

A post office was established in Powder Valley on Oct 9, 1889.

In 1878, Charles Stahl began making pottery at his homestead, making traditional plates, flower pots, etc. The business continued for 23 years until 1901. Charles's sons, Thomas and Isaac Stahl, revived their father's business in 1932. Thomas Stahl died in 1942, and the business was continued by Isaac until his death in 1946. The business was continued by Russell Stahl, who died in 1986. The descendants of Thomas Stahl purchased Stahl pottery at a public auction and established the Stahl's Pottery Preservation Society. Today, the site of Isaac and Thomas Stahl's kiln is preserved and is the location of an annual summer pottery festival.

== Education ==
Powder Valley is served by the East Penn School District. Emmaus High School in Emmaus serves grades nine through 12. Eyer Middle School and Lower Macungie Middle School, both in Macungie, serve grades six through eight.
