= Centennial Bridge (Center Valley, Pennsylvania) =

- U.S. National Register of Historic Places
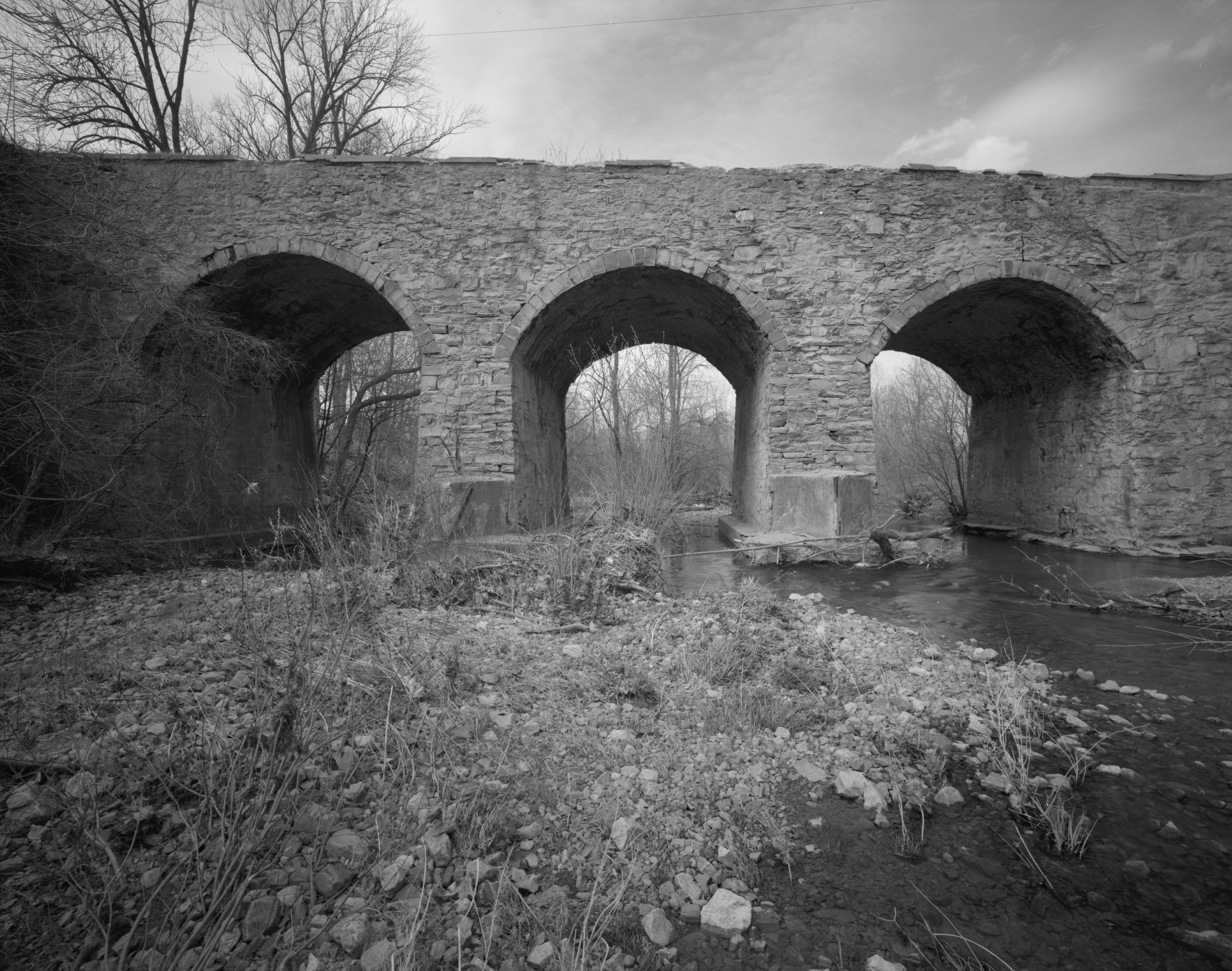
- Centennial Bridge in Center Valley, Pennsylvania

- Location within Pennsylvania Location within the United States
- Location: Station Ave. over Saucon Creek, Center Valley, Pennsylvania, U.S.
- Coordinates: 40°31′43″N 75°23′31″W
- Area: less than one acre
- Built: 1876
- Architectural style: Multi-span stone arch
- Demolished: 2013
- MPS: Highway Bridges Owned by the Commonwealth of Pennsylvania, Department of Transportation TR
- NRHP reference No.: 88000772
- Added to NRHP: June 22, 1988

Centennial Bridge was a historic stone arch bridge located in Center Valley, Pennsylvania in the Lehigh Valley region of eastern Pennsylvania. It was built in 1876, and was a 233-foot-long (71 m) bridge, with three 23-foot-long (7.0 m), horseshoe shaped arches. It crossed Saucon Creek.

== History ==
=== 19th century ===
The proposal for the bridge was created by local farmers for a safer means to transport their cattle and dairy products to market. The portion of Center Valley located east of a Saucon Creek tributary was known as Milk Town because of its many dairy farms; it also had a rail station of the North Pennsylvania Railroad which opened on December 26, 1856. The valley of the creek proved to be a formidable hazard, especially in poor weather.

In 1874, the Allentown & Coopersburg Turnpike opened and sparked further interest in building a bridge. August 2, 1875, the Lehigh County grand jury recommended to county Commissioners Jacob Leiby (of the nearby Jacob Leiby Farm), Jesse Solliday and Daniel Lauer that the bridge be built. That September 13, the commissioners allocated $1,200 for the bridge. The turnpike's owner, Enos Erdman, was contracted for most of the construction and the bridge opened on September 18, 1876. A local legend persists that penal labour was used to build the bridge, although all records point to contracted laborers under the employ of Erdman.

=== 20th century ===
Repairs were made to the Centennial Bridge in 1918 and in 1933. County inspectors described the bridge as being in “fair shape.” In 1936, the state Highways Department took over responsibility for the bridge from the county. Unlike the surrounding roads, the bridge was never expanded or renovated to handle large motor vehicles. The bridge was listed on the National Register of Historic Places in 1988. After 116 years of use, on April 2, 1992, the Pennsylvania Department of Transportation closed the bridge after a large crack was discovered in the supporting arches and the bridge was deemed unsafe. The bridge was demolished in 2013.

== See also ==
- List of bridges documented by the Historic American Engineering Record in Pennsylvania
