= Beatrice Kemmerer =

American baseball player

- Catcher / Shortstop
- Born: February 23, 1930; Center Valley, Pennsylvania, U.S.
- Died: November 2, 2013 (aged 83); South Bend, Indiana, U.S.
- Batted: Right Threw: Right

Teams
- Fort Wayne Daisies (1950); South Bend Blue Sox (1950–1951)

Career highlights and awards
- Championship team (1951); Women in Baseball – AAGPBL Permanent Display at Baseball Hall of Fame and Museum (1988)

Beatrice "Beatty" Kemmerer (February 23, 1930 – November 2, 2013) was an American backup catcher and shortstop who played from 1950 through 1951 in the All-American Girls Professional Baseball League (AAGPBL). Listed at 5' 3", 145 lb., Kemmerer batted and threw right handed. She was dubbed Beatty.

A member of a championship team, Beatrice Kemmerer played in less than ten games in both of the two seasons she spent in the league, due to an injury suffered in a regular season game.

Born in Center Valley, Pennsylvania, Kemmerer grew up playing sandlot ball with her siblings and the neighbor kids at an early age. Eventually, in 1950 she asked her parents' permission to try out for the league and later earned a spot as a catcher for the Fort Wayne Daisies. After spending only two months with the team, an ankle injury sidelined her for most of the year. She came back late in the season and was assigned to the South Bend Blue Sox.

In 1951, Kemmerer was used sparingly by South Bend manager Karl Winsch, while catching and filling in at shortstop, helping the Blue Sox win their first pennant and championship title.

After baseball, Kemmerer worked in an Indiana factory for 40 years. She also umpired ballgames and helped with any social event she could, until become an active member of the AAGPBL Players Association.

The association was largely responsible for the opening of Women in Baseball, a permanent display based at the Baseball Hall of Fame and Museum in Cooperstown, New York, which was unveiled in 1988 to honor the entire All-American Girls Professional Baseball League.

Kemmerer died on November 2, 2013, in South Bend, Indiana.
