= Hosensack, Pennsylvania =

Unincorporated community in Pennsylvania, U.S.

Hosensack
- Unincorporated community
- Interactive map of Hosensack
- Coordinates: 40°27′13.36″N 75°29′48.66″W
- Country: United States
- State: Pennsylvania
- County: Lehigh
- Township: Lower Milford
- Elevation: 430 ft (130 m)
- Time zone: UTC-5 (EST)
  - Summer (DST): UTC-4 (EDT)
- Area code: 215
- GNIS Feature ID 1203845

Hosensack (HOE-zen-sak) is an unincorporated community in Lower Milford Township in Lehigh County, Pennsylvania. It is part of the Lehigh Valley region of eastern Pennsylvania, which has a population of 861,899 and was the 68th-most populous metropolitan area in the U.S. as of the 2020 census.

Hosensack Creek flows southwestward through the village into the Perkiomen Creek in Palm. Zionsville is two miles to the north and Hosensack residents use its zip code of 18092, except for a very small number on Mill Hill who use the East Greenville zip code of 18041. It is in the Pennsburg telephone exchange and uses area code 215.

== History ==
The site of Hosensack, was first settled in 1734, by Henry Kieber. A tavern and a school were built shortly after. When the name Hosensack, first began to be used is unknown, but it is derived from German Hosensack, meaning pants pocket. The exact reason for this is unknown, but it has been suggested that it may be akin to the phrase cul-de-sac. On the other hand, local legend posits that the name was given by a party of wagoners, who after spending the night in the valley were reported as saying, "es war so dunkel wie in einem Hosensack", meaning "it was as dark as in a pants pocket."

1841 saw the establishment of a post office, which lasted until it was discontinued in 1910.
