= Lifestyle center =

Open-air shopping center

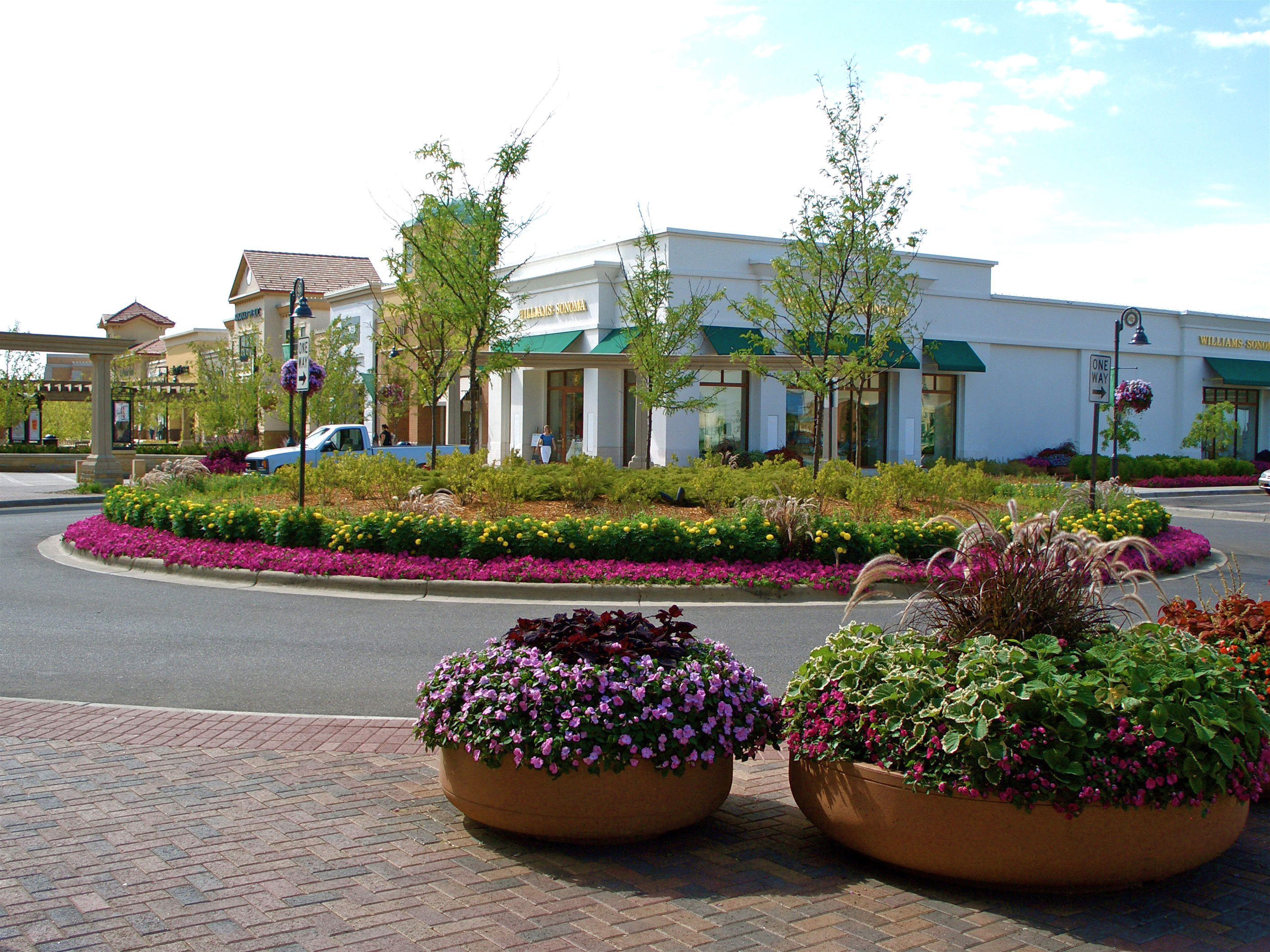
The Shoppes at Arbor Lakes, a lifestyle center in Maple Grove, Minnesota

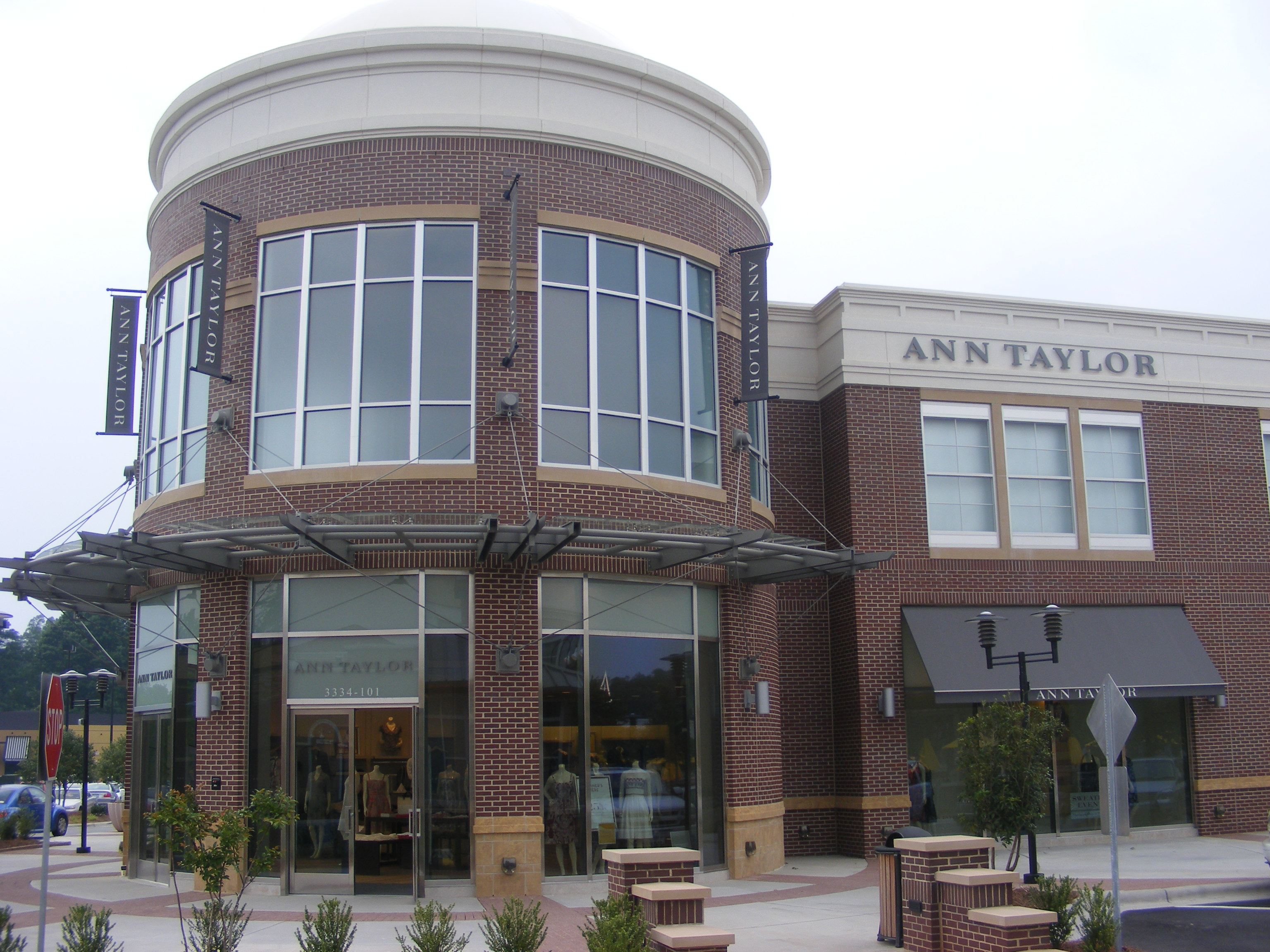
The Shops at Friendly Center, a lifestyle center in Greensboro, North Carolina

A lifestyle center (American English), or lifestyle centre (Commonwealth English), is an open-air shopping center which aims to create a "pedestrian-friendly, town-like atmosphere with sidewalks, landscaping, ambient lighting, and park benches. Memphis developers Poag and McEwen are generally credited with developing the concept in the late 1980s. Lifestyle centers emerged as a major retailing trend in the late 1990s. Sometimes labeled boutique malls or ersatz downtown, they are often located in affluent suburban areas.

== History ==
The proliferation of lifestyle centers in the United States accelerated in the early 21st century, growing from 30 nationally in 2002 to 120 at the end of 2004. They lie on the upscale end of commercial development, with discount-based outlet malls on the low end.

== Design ==
Lifestyle centers typically require less land and may generate higher revenue margins, generating close to $500 per square foot, compared to an average of $330 per square foot for a traditional mall, according to the president of Poag and McEwen. Other advantages lifestyle centers have over traditional enclosed malls are savings on heating and cooling and quicker access for customers.

Unlike the traditional commercial layout of strip shopping centers, lifestyle centers present their formal storefronts as facing each other across a landscaped pedestrian walkway or a low volume two-lane road. Those with a more extensive street grid or more multifunctional and dense development include offices, hotels, residential, retail, and entertainment, often with a designated function to act as the community's center. One of the earliest proponents of lifestyle centers was RED Development, which built centers primarily in the Midwest and Southwest United States.

== See also ==
- Festival marketplace
- Outlet mall
- Power center
- Shopping mall
