= Friedensville, Pennsylvania =

Unincorporated community in Pennsylvania, US

- Unincorporated community
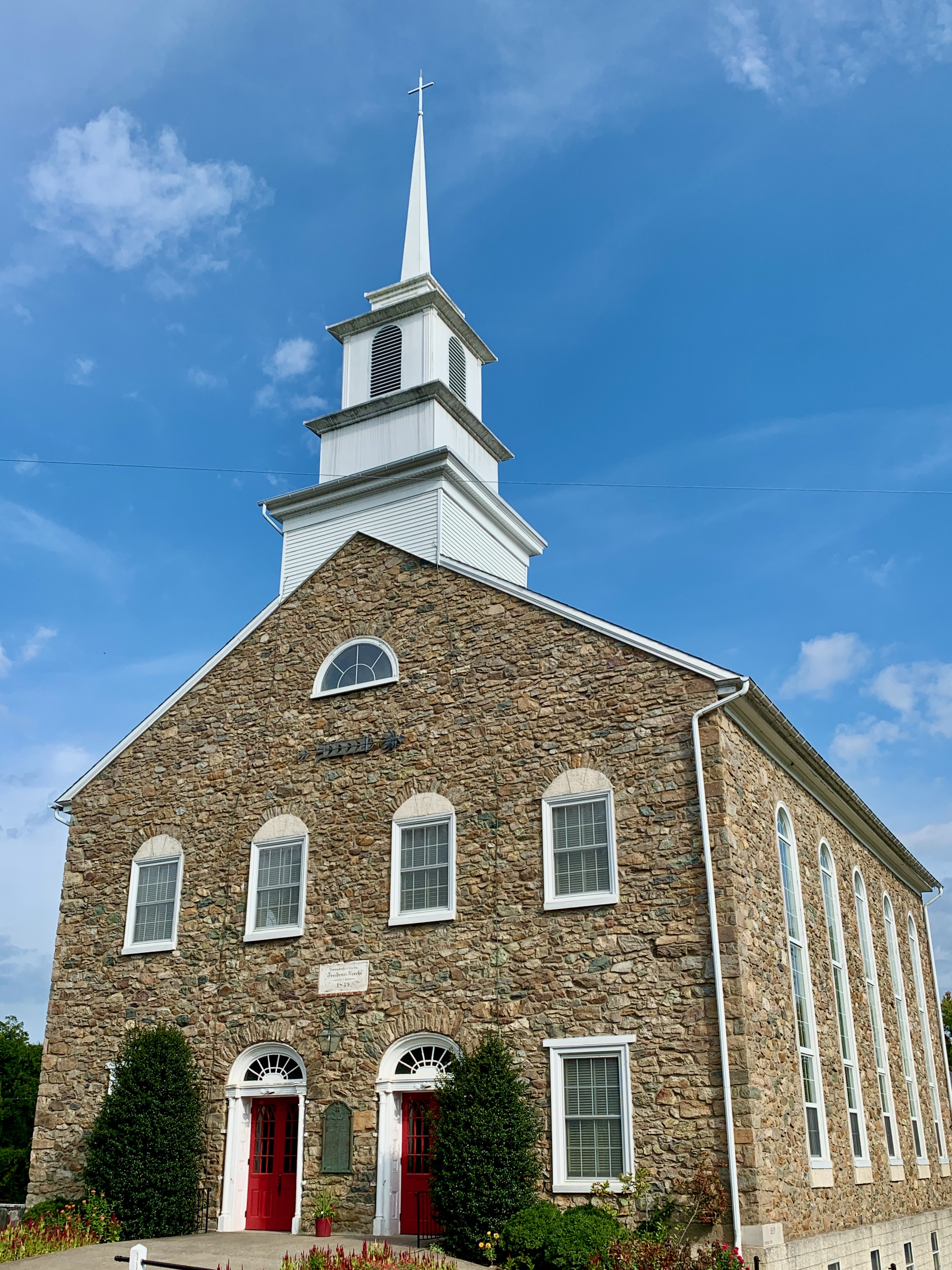
- Friedens Evangelical Lutheran Church in Friedensville

- Location within Pennsylvania
- Coordinates: 40°33′33″N 75°23′41″W
- Country: United States
- State: Pennsylvania
- County: Lehigh
- Township: Upper Saucon Township
- Elevation: 420 ft (130 m)

Population
  - Metro: 865,310 (US: 68th)
- Time zone: UTC-5 (Eastern (EST))
  - Summer (DST): UTC-4 (EDT)
- ZIP Code: 18017
- GNIS feature ID: 1175250

Friedensville is an unincorporated community which is located in Upper Saucon Township in Lehigh County, Pennsylvania. It is part of the Lehigh Valley, which had a population of 861,899 and was the 68th-most populous metropolitan area in the U.S. as of the 2020 census.

The community's name is derived from the German: Friedenskirche, "Church of peace". Zinc mining was once a key industry in the area.

== History ==
Friedensville Zinc Mines, founded in 1845, were an important operation in Friedensville. Jacob Ueberroth (1786–1862), a local farmer, first discovered the zinc mineral, around 1830. The zinc mines were active from 1853 to 1893.

The zinc mines became famous around the world with the 1872 installation of "The President," then the world's largest pumping engine. The machine could lift 17,500 gallons of water a minute. The massive engine was scrapped in 1900. After the engine was scrapped, one of the 22 boilers associated with it was sold to the Buehler furniture factory in Allentown, PA where it was utilized as a water tank. It was acquired by Lehigh University in is currently in storage, slated to be displayed at the former mine site, near the stone ruins of the engine house.

In 1881, Franklin Osgood purchased the Lehigh Zinc Company’s mines and formed the Friedensville Zinc Company. He built a zinc oxide plant and zinc smelter in Friedensville.
