= Dillingersville Union School and Church =

Historic church in Pennsylvania, United States

- U.S. National Register of Historic Places
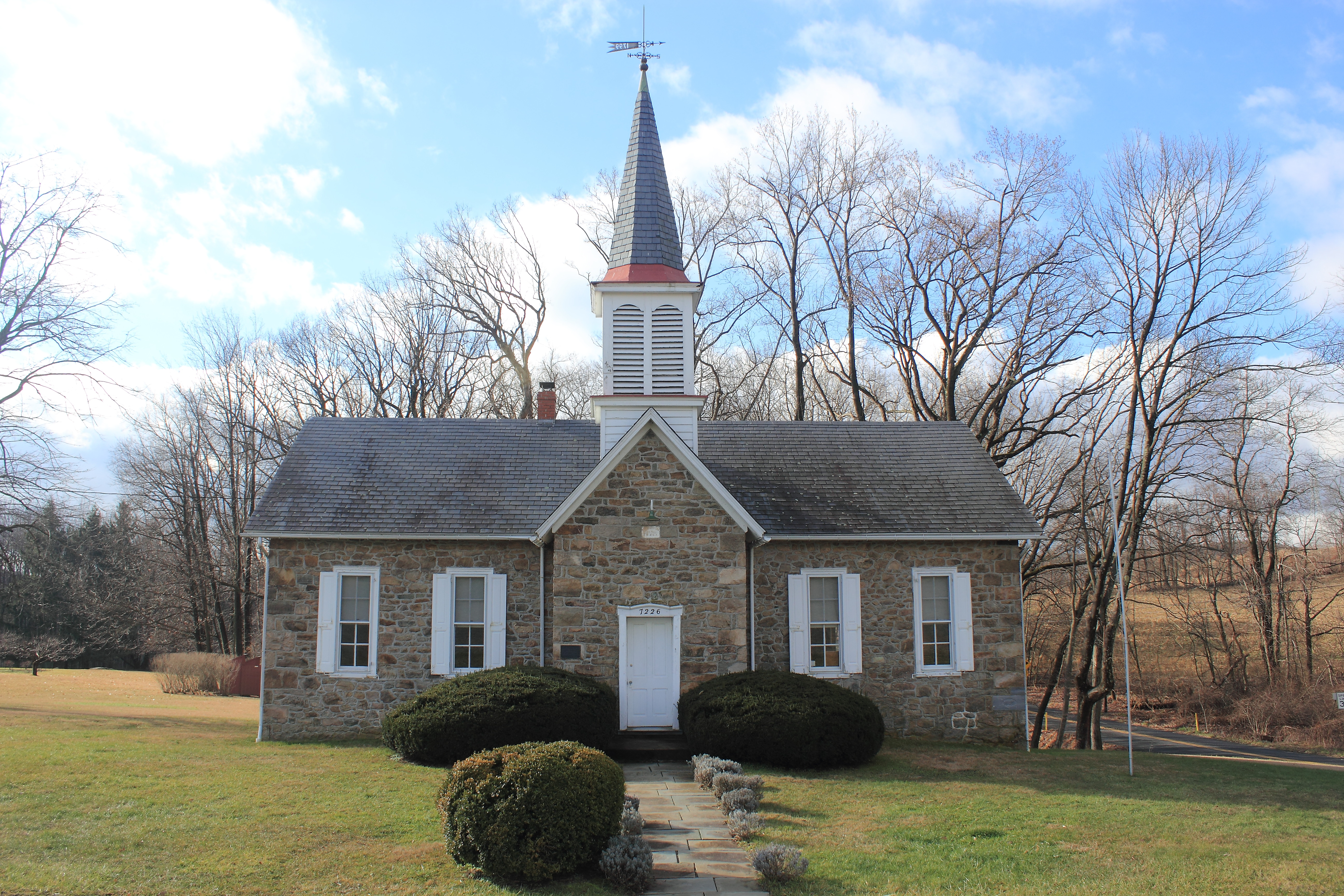
- Dillingersville Union Church and School in December 2012

- Location within Pennsylvania Location within the United States
- Location: East of Zionsville on Zionsville Road, Lower Milford Township, Pennsylvania
- Coordinates: 40°28′26″N 75°29′17″W
- Area: 2 acres (0.81 ha)
- Built: 1885
- NRHP reference No.: 79002290
- Added to NRHP: October 25, 1979

Dillingersville Union School and Church is a historic church and school building located at Lower Milford Township in Lehigh County, Pennsylvania. It was built in 1885, and is a one-story, rectangular fieldstone building measuring 52 feet by 30 feet. It has a gable roof topped with a frame bell cupola. The building ceased use as a school in 1941, and is used as a community museum and educational resource.

It was added to the National Register of Historic Places in 1978.
