= Coopersburg, Pennsylvania =

Borough in Pennsylvania, US

- Borough
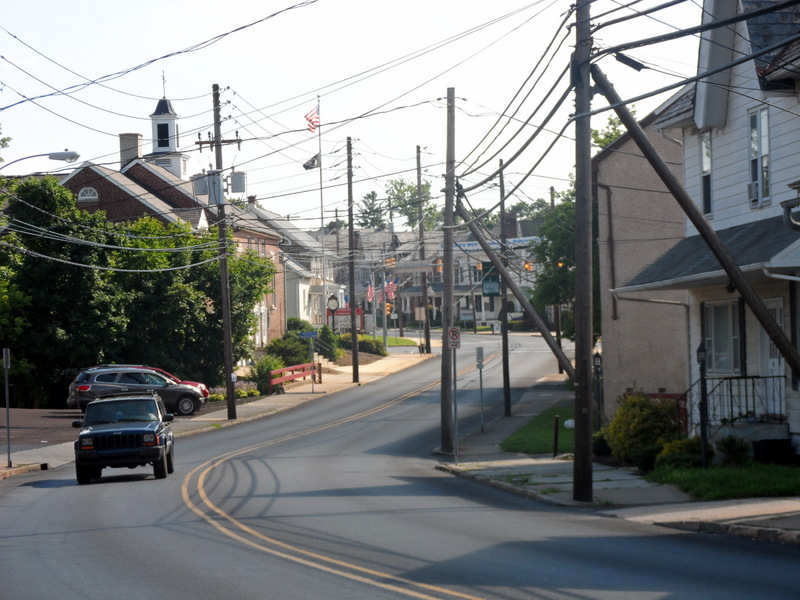
- Coopersburg in July 2013

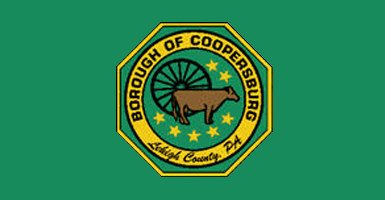
- Flag Seal

- Location of Coopersburg in Lehigh County, Pennsylvania (left) and of Lehigh County in Pennsylvania (right)

- Location of Coopersburg in Pennsylvania Coopersburg, Pennsylvania (the United States)
- Coordinates: 40°30′37″N 75°23′24″W
- Country: United States
- State: Pennsylvania
- County: Lehigh

Government
  - Mayor: Gary Hovis

Area
  - Borough: 0.93 sq mi (2.42 km^{2})
  - Land: 0.93 sq mi (2.42 km^{2})
  - Water: 0.0039 sq mi (0.01 km^{2})
- Elevation: 545 ft (166 m)

Population (2020)
  - Borough: 2,447
  - Density: 2,622.7/sq mi (1,012.63/km^{2})
  - Metro: 865,310 (US: 68th)
- Time zone: UTC-5 (EST)
  - Summer (DST): UTC-4 (EDT)
- ZIP code: 18036
- Area code: 610
- FIPS code: 42-16056
- Primary airport: Lehigh Valley International Airport
- Major hospital: Lehigh Valley Hospital–Cedar Crest
- School district: Southern Lehigh
- Website: www.coopersburgborough.org

Coopersburg is a borough in Lehigh County, Pennsylvania, United States. The population of Coopersburg was 2,447 as of the 2020 census. It is a suburb of Allentown and is located 7 miles (11 km) southeast of Allentown, 40 miles (64 km) north of Philadelphia, and 76 miles (122 km) west of New York City.

Coopersburg is part of the Lehigh Valley metropolitan area, which had a population of 861,899 and was the 68th-most populous metropolitan area in the U.S. as of the 2020 census.

== Geography ==
Coopersburg is located at 40°30′37″N 75°23′24″W (40.510262, -75.389901). According to the U.S. Census Bureau, the borough has a total area of 0.9 square miles (2.3 km^{2}), all land. The borough is mostly surrounded by Upper Saucon Township, with two portions in the southeast touching Springfield Township in Bucks County.

== Demographics ==
Historical population
Census	Pop.	Note	%±
1880	392		—
1890	454		15.8%
1900	556		22.5%
1910	683		22.8%
1920	870		27.4%
1930	1,057		21.5%
1940	1,193		12.9%
1950	1,462		22.5%
1960	1,800		23.1%
1970	2,326		29.2%
1980	2,595		11.6%
1990	2,599		0.2%
2000	2,582		−0.7%
2010	2,386		−7.6%
2020	2,447		2.6%

As of the census of 2010, there were 2,386 people living in the borough. The racial makeup of the borough was 95.7% White, 0.6% African American, 0.1% Native American, 1.1% Asian, 0.0% Pacific Islander, 0.9% from other races, and 1.5% from two or more races. Hispanic or Latino of any race were 3.5% of the population.

As of the 2000 census, there were 2,582 people, 983 households, and 671 families living in the borough. The population density was 2,780.7 inhabitants per square mile (1,073.6/km^{2}). There were 1,050 housing units at an average density of 1,130.8 per square mile (436.6/km^{2}). The racial makeup of the borough was 96.01% White, 0.70% African American, 0.08% Native American, 1.70% Asian, 0.04% Pacific Islander, 0.46% from other races, and 1.01% from two or more races. Hispanic or Latino of any race were 1.78% of the population.

There were 983 households, out of which 29.3% had children under the age of 18 living with them, 54.5% were married couples living together, 9.4% had a female householder with no husband present, and 31.7% were non-families. 26.7% of all households were made up of individuals, and 11.1% had someone living alone who was 65 years of age or older. The average household size was 2.46 and the average family size was 2.99.

In the borough, the population was spread out, with 21.6% under the age of 18, 7.6% from 18 to 24, 26.4% from 25 to 44, 23.7% from 45 to 64, and 20.7% who were 65 years of age or older. The median age was 41 years. For every 100 females there were 94.4 males. For every 100 females age 18 and over, there were 88.0 males. The median income for a household in the borough was $43,603, and the median income for a family was $51,935. Males had a median income of $36,938 versus $29,545 for females. The per capita income for the borough was $21,689. About 2.8% of families and 2.9% of the population were below the poverty line, including 1.1% of those under age 18 and 4.5% of those age 65 or over.

United States presidential election results for Coopersburg, Pennsylvania
Year	Republican		Democratic		Third party(ies)	
Year	No.	%	No.	%	No.	%
2024	806	52.27%	720	46.69%	16	1.04%
2020	768	51.06%	710	47.21%	26	1.73%
2016	618	52.78%	488	41.67%	65	5.55%
2012	524	50.38%	493	47.40%	23	2.21%
2008	489	43.35%	615	54.52%	24	2.13%
2004	565	50.58%	542	48.52%	10	0.90%

== History ==
Coopersburg was settled in about 1730. It originally was named Freyburg after local tavern owner and Joseph Frey, a judge. By the time the town was incorporated, it had been renamed Coopersburg, named after Judge Peter Cooper. The town was once the site of popular cattle sales at the estate of Tilghman S. Cooper.

== Education ==
Along with Upper Saucon and Lower Milford Townships, Coopersburg is served by the Southern Lehigh School District. There are two elementary schools in the district serving kindergarten through third grades, Liberty Bell and Hopewell. The Joseph P. Liberati Intermediate School serves fourth through sixth grades. There is one middle school that houses seventh and eighth graders. The district has one high school, Southern Lehigh High School, for students in ninth through twelfth grades.

== Transportation ==
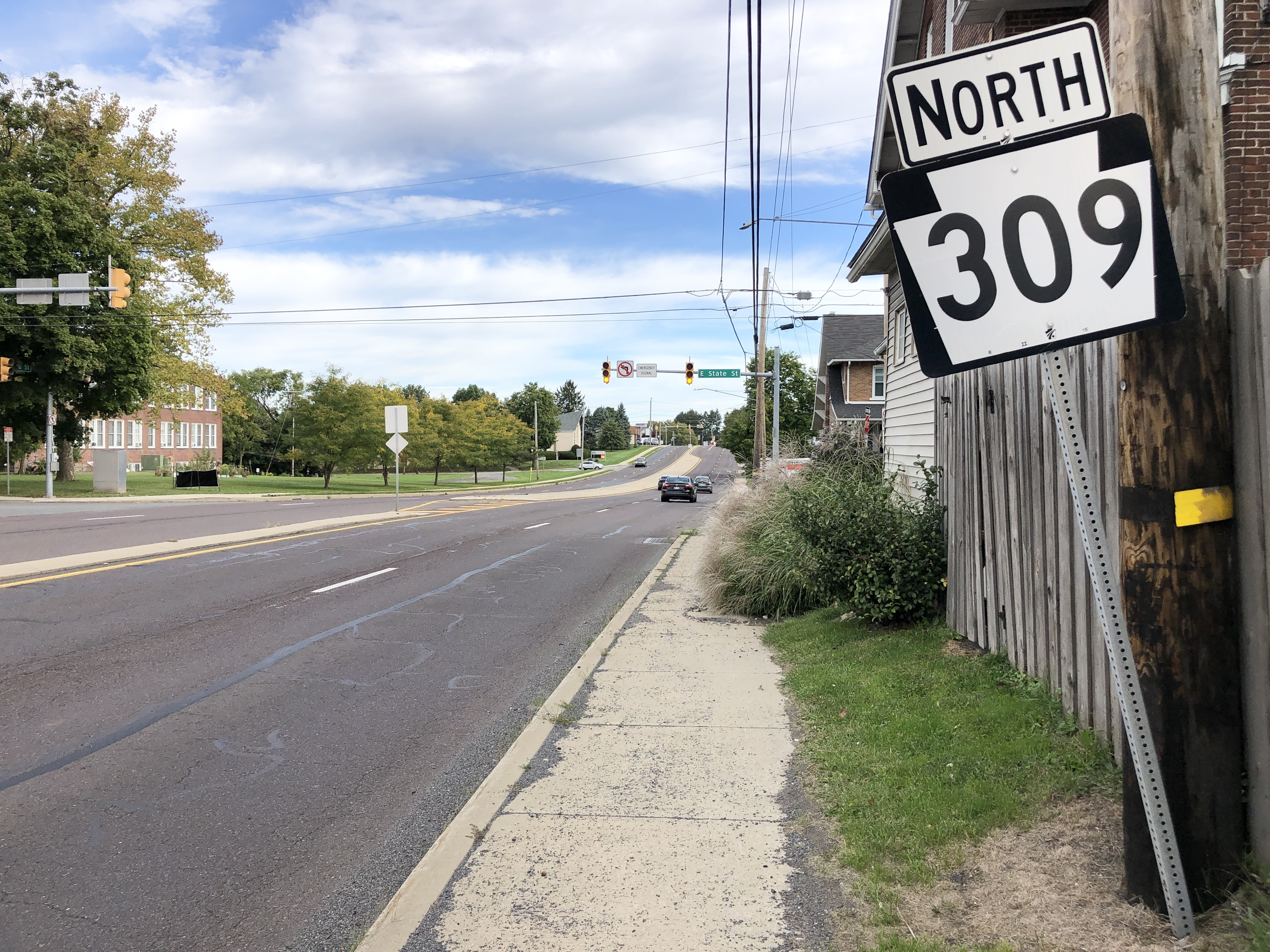
PA Route 309 North in Coopersburg

As of 2007, there were 12.04 miles (19.38 km) of public roads in Coopersburg, of which 2.93 miles (4.72 km) were maintained by the Pennsylvania Department of Transportation (PennDOT) and 9.11 miles (14.66 km) were maintained by the borough.

Pennsylvania Route 309 is passes through Coopersburg, following Third Street along a north–south alignment through the eastern portion of the borough.

== Notable people ==
- Chuck Bednarik, former professional football player, Philadelphia Eagles, and member of Pro Football Hall of Fame
- Martin Hans Boyè, Danish-American chemist
- Thomas Buchecker Cooper, a Democratic member of the U.S. House of Representatives from Pennsylvania
- Jacob Erdman, a Democratic member of the U.S. House of Representatives from Pennsylvania
- Joseph Fry Jr., a Jacksonian member of the U.S. House of Representatives from Pennsylvania
- John Grogan, author of Marley and Me
- Harvey E. Jordan, American medical academic and eugenicist
- Alton W. Knappenberger, United States Army soldier and a recipient of the United States military's highest decoration—the Medal of Honor—for his actions in World War II
- Noel LaMontagne, a former American football offensive guard, Cleveland Browns
- Gina Lewandowski, a former American soccer player, FFC Frankfurt, Western New York Flash, Bayern Munich, NJ/NY Gotham FC
- John Myung, bassist and founding member of Dream Theater
- Mike Portnoy, founding member and drummer for Dream Theater
- Elizabeth Price, former gymnast, alternate to U.S. 2012 Olympic gymnastics team
- Donald L. Ritter, a Republican member of the U.S. House of Representatives from Pennsylvania
- Jimmie Schaffer, former professional baseball catcher, Chicago Cubs, Chicago White Sox, Cincinnati Reds, Philadelphia Phillies, and St. Louis Cardinals
- Justin Simmons, former member of Pennsylvania House of Representatives
