= Southern Lehigh School District =

School district in Pennsylvania

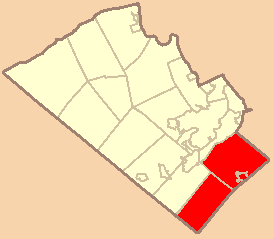
- Location of Southern Lehigh School District in Lehigh County, Pennsylvania

Address
- 5775 Main Street Coopersburg, Pennsylvania, 18034; United States

District information
- Type: Public
- Schools: Five, including Southern Lehigh High School
- Budget: $73.604 million
- NCES District ID: 4222350

Students and staff
- Students: 3,063 (2024-25)
- Teachers: 206.00 (on an FTE basis)
- Student–teacher ratio: 14.87
- Athletic conference: Eastern Pennsylvania Conference
- Colors: Blue and White

Other information
- Website: www.slsd.org

Southern Lehigh School District is a public school district located in Lehigh County, Pennsylvania. It serves the borough of Coopersburg and Lower Milford and Upper Saucon townships in the Lehigh Valley region of eastern Pennsylvania.

Students in ninth through 12th grade attend the district's high school, Southern Lehigh High School in Center Valley. Southern Lehigh Middle School serves 7th and 8th graders. The district's intermediate school for fourth through sixth grades, Joseph P. Liberati Intermediate School, opened in 2009. The district has two elementary schools serving kindergarten through third grades, Hopewell and Liberty Bell.

As of the 2024–25 school year, the district had 3,063 students across its five schools, according to National Center for Education Statistics.

== Schools ==
- Southern Lehigh High School
- Southern Lehigh Middle School
- Joseph P Liberati Intermediate School
- Hopewell Elementary School
- Liberty Bell Elementary School
