= Southern Lehigh High School =

Southern Lehigh Senior High School

Location
- 5800 Main Street; Center Valley, Pennsylvania 18034; United States; 40.5345°N 75.3995°W

Information
- Type: Public high school
- Established: 1955; 71 years ago
- NCES School ID: 422235002839
- Principal: Joshua Miller
- Staff: 66.00 (on an FTE basis)
- Grades: 9th–12th
- Enrollment: 1,013 (2024–25)
- Student to teacher ratio: 15.35
- Campus type: Suburb: Large
- Colors: Blue and white
- Athletics conference: Colonial League
- Mascot: The Spartan
- Newspaper: The Spotlight
- Yearbook: Solehian
- Website: hs.slsd.org

Southern Lehigh High School is a four-year public high school located in Center Valley, Pennsylvania, in the Lehigh Valley region of eastern Pennsylvania, United States. It is the only high school in the Southern Lehigh School District.

As of the 2024–25 school year, the school had an enrollment of 1,013 students, according to National Center for Education Statistics data.

The school's mascot is the Spartan, and the school colors are blue and white.

== History ==
Southern Lehigh High School was built in 1955. Prior to its construction, some students in the district attended high school at William Allen High School in Allentown while others attended Coopersburg High School, which closed when Southern Lehigh High School opened in 1955.

== Athletics ==
Southern Lehigh High School is a member of the Pennsylvania Interscholastic Athletic Association's District XI and most of its sports compete in the Colonial League. Southern Lehigh High School is one of eleven Lehigh Valley-area high schools with an ice hockey team; it competes in the Lehigh Valley Scholastic Ice Hockey League. In 2022, the team made school history by winning their first ever LVSHL District Championship.

== Student organizations and clubs ==
=== FIRST Robotics team ===
Southern Lehigh High School's FIRST Robotics Competition team, the Spartechs, has participated in the FIRST Robotics Competition since 2002. The robotics team has competed at the FIRST Championship in 2016, 2017, and 2023.

=== Speech and debate team ===
Southern Lehigh's speech and debate team was established by physics teacher David Long in 1992 and has competed at multiple national and state tournaments. It has recorded five PHSSL state champions. The team competes in the Pennsylvania High School Speech League, the National Catholic Forensic League, and the National Speech and Debate Association competitions.

== Notable alumni ==
- Noel LaMontagne, former professional football player, Cleveland Browns
- Jimmie Schaffer, former professional baseball player, Chicago Cubs, Chicago White Sox, Cincinnati Reds, New York Mets, Philadelphia Phillies, and St. Louis Cardinals
- Andrew Olesh, college football tight end, Oregon Ducks
