= Center Valley, Pennsylvania =

Unincorporated community in Pennsylvania, US

- Unincorporated community
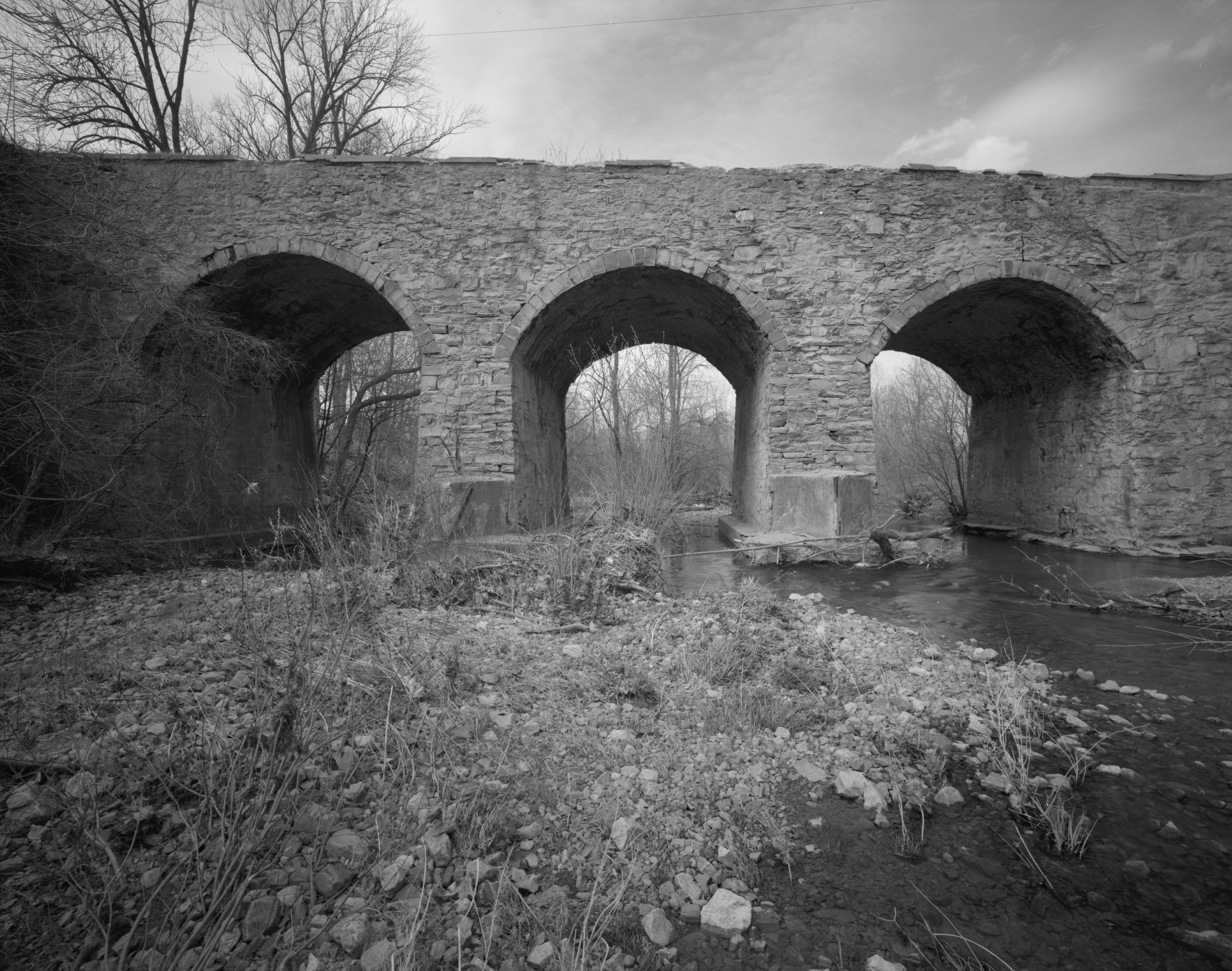
- Centennial Bridge in Center Valley in March 1996

- Location within Pennsylvania Location within the United States
- Coordinates: 40°31′45″N 75°23′36″W
- Country: United States
- State: Pennsylvania
- County: Lehigh
- Township: Upper Saucon
- Elevation: 443 ft (135 m)
- Time zone: UTC-5 (Eastern (EST))
  - Summer (DST): UTC-4 (EDT)
- ZIP Code: 18034
- Area codes: 610 and 484
- GNIS feature ID: 1171463

Center Valley is an unincorporated community located one mile north of Coopersburg, at the intersection of Pennsylvania State Routes 309 and 378 in Upper Saucon Township in Lehigh County, Pennsylvania, United States. It is part of the Lehigh Valley, which had a population of 861,899 and was the 68th-most populous metropolitan area in the U.S. as of the 2020 census.

== History ==
Centennial Bridge in Center Valley, built in 1876, was listed on the National Register of Historic Places in 1989. The bridge was demolished in 2013.

== Commerce and businesses ==
Stabler Corporate Center, one of the largest areas of land being developed in the Lehigh Valley, is located in Center Valley. In October 2006, Promenade Saucon Valley, the Lehigh Valley's highest-end outdoor mall, opened in Center Valley. The mall includes a variety of shops and businesses.

Center Valley is also home to the public library called Southern Lehigh Public Library.

Center Valley also is the headquarters of Olympus Corporation for the Americas, Shift4, JetPay, Aesculap (a subsidiary of B. Braun), and the Patriot League, a college athletic conference with 24 men's and women's collegiate sports. The city also holds large regional offices for Dun & Bradstreet and Mass Mutual.

Good Shepherd Rehabilitation opened a 76-bed inpatient rehabilitation hospital in Center Valley in 2023.

== Demographics ==
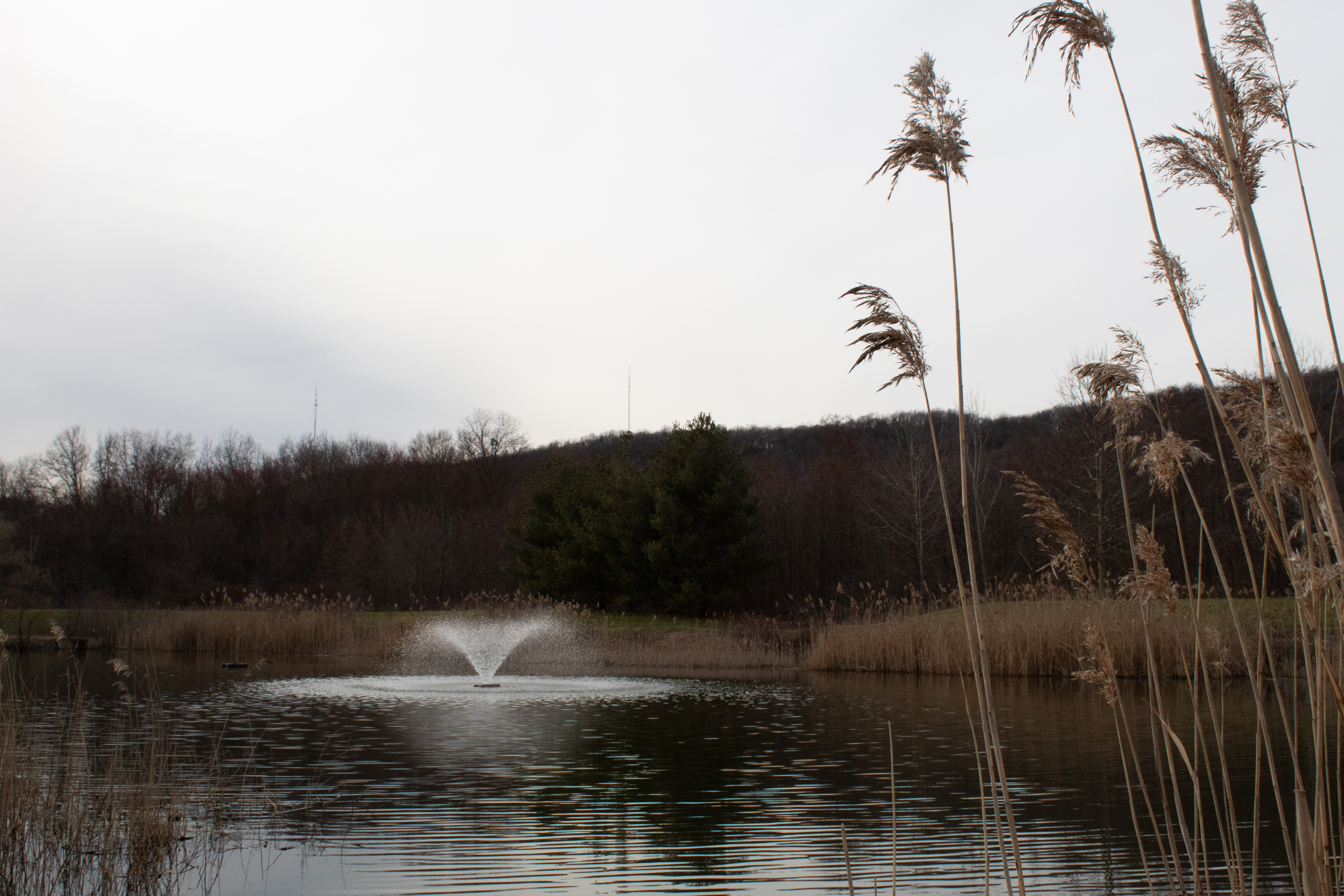
The nature trail behind Promenade Saucon Valley in Center Valley

As of 2021, 10,345 people are living in Center Valley. The racial breakdown of the valley is 86.8% White, 5.3% Hispanic, 0.7% African American, 3.1% Asian, and 4.2% other.

Last updated in 2021, it was said that the average income of Center Valley is higher than the average overall in the United States. The average earning per household is around $122,000.

== Education ==
=== Primary and secondary education ===
Center Valley is part of the Southern Lehigh School District. Students in grades nine through 12 attend Southern Lehigh High School in Center Valley.

Southern Lehigh School District has a total of 3,047 students as of the 2023–2024 school year and a total of 196 teachers.

=== Colleges and universities ===
Two campuses of higher education are located in Center Valley:

- DeSales University
- Penn State Lehigh Valley

== Notable people ==
- Ed Freed, former professional baseball player, Philadelphia Phillies
- Beatrice Kemmerer, former All-American Girls Professional Baseball League player
