= State Route 1002 (Lehigh County, Pennsylvania) =

Highway in Pennsylvania

State Route 1002
- Main Street; Tilghman Street; Union Boulevard

Route information
- Maintained by PennDOT
- Length: 13.794 mi (22.199 km)
- Existed: 1987–present

Major junctions
- West end: SR 3014 (Church Street) in Fogelsville
- PA 100 in Fogelsville; US 22 near Kuhnsville; I-476 / Penna Turnpike NE Extension in South Whitehall Township; PA 309 in South Whitehall Township; PA 145 in Allentown
- East end: PA 378 in Bethlehem

Location
- Country: United States
- State: Pennsylvania
- Counties: Lehigh

Highway system
- Pennsylvania State Route System; Interstate; US; State; Scenic; Legislative

State Route 1002 (SR 1002), locally known as Tilghman Street and Union Boulevard, is a major 13.8 mi (22.2 km) long east–west road in the Lehigh Valley region of eastern Pennsylvania. The majority of the roadway is the former alignment of U.S. Route 22, maintained by the Pennsylvania Department of Transportation as a Quadrant Route, and is not signed except on small white segment markers.

Tilghman Street begins at Pennsylvania Route 100 in Fogelsville, though SR 1002 continues west on Main Street, also known as the old US 22, to the intersection of Church Street (SR 3014). It becomes Union Boulevard just east of the bridge over the Lehigh River in Allentown; SR 1002 ends at the interchange with Pennsylvania Route 378 in Bethlehem. Union Boulevard continues over Monocacy Creek, which forms the border between Lehigh and Northampton Counties, and ends in downtown Bethlehem.

As of 2007, an average of 21,018 vehicles used the highway daily in South Whitehall Township and 21,706 in Allentown.

== History ==
=== 20th century ===
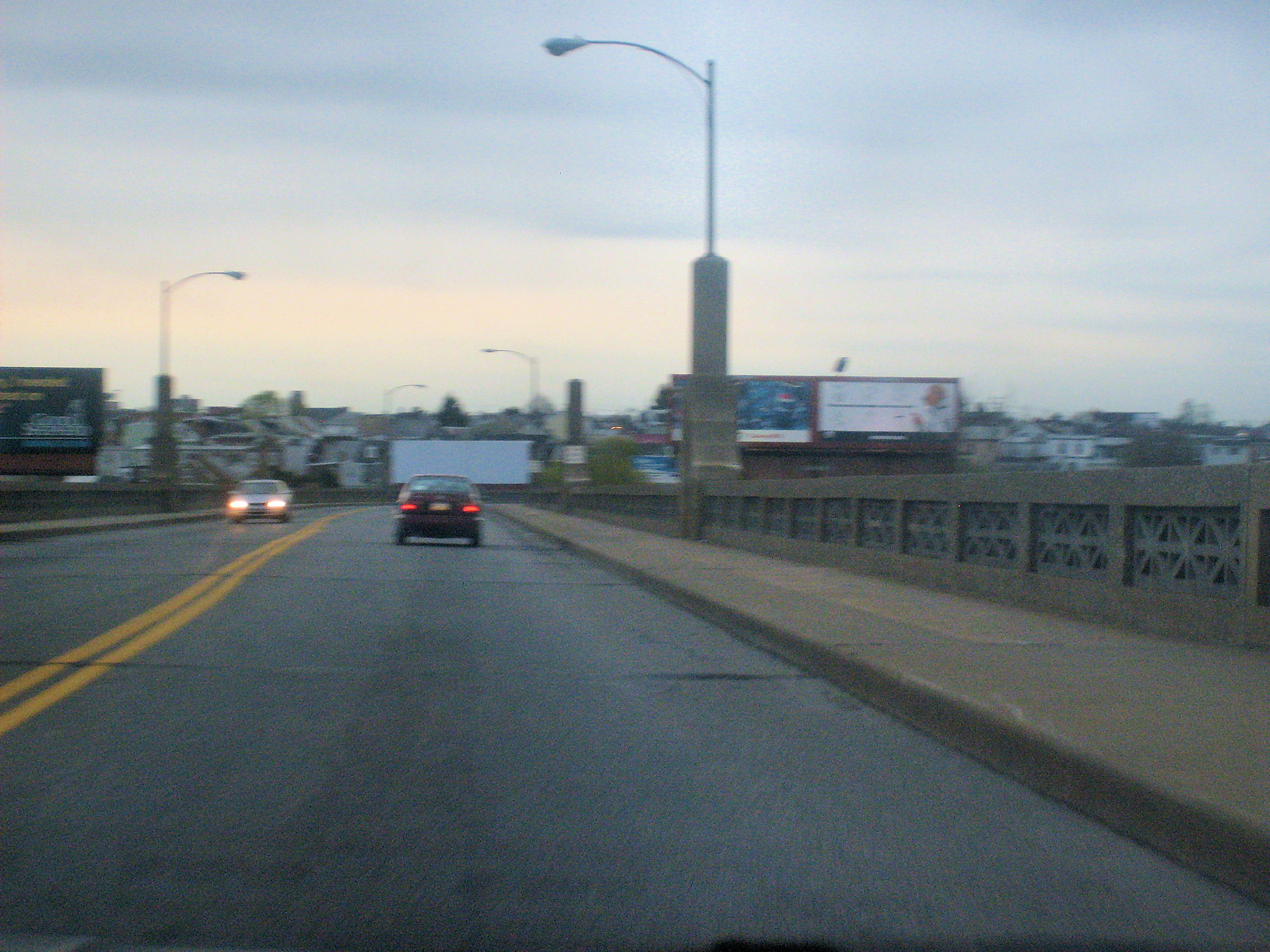
Built in 1929, Tilghman Street Bridge, which crosses the Lehigh River in Allentown's east-side, is the oldest bridge on SR 1002.

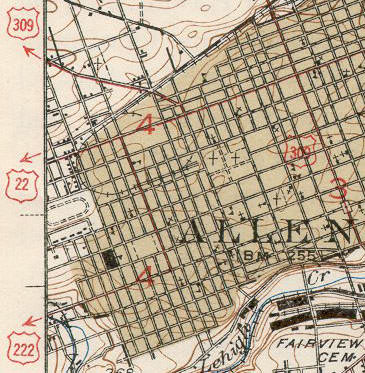
A 1939 map of Tilghman Street

When the state began taking over Pennsylvania highways following passage of the Sproul Road Bill, signed May 31, 1911, this system did not include the direct Allentown to Harrisburg route to which Interstate 78 belonged. The main route to Harrisburg was renamed William Penn Highway, and further south, on Hamilton Boulevard, it was Pennsylvania Route 222, and U.S. Route 222; the portion near Allentown was Legislative Route 157 (LR 157).

Another route west from Allentown, which later became U.S. Route 309, ran northwest from Allentown via Walbert Avenue to Schnecksville. Travelers could continue via New Tripoli to Lenhartsville, and then along a route approximating the present I-78 to Harrisburg. From Allentown east to downtown Bethlehem, LR 159 used Hanover Avenue and Broad Street.

William Penn Highway was organized as an alternative to the Lincoln Highway being parallel to the Pennsylvania Railroad west of Harrisburg. The route's New York City extension, built and named in 1916, passed through Allentown. In 1924, the state named this Pennsylvania Route 3. Two years later, in 1924, in 1926, it was incorporated as part of U.S. Route 22.

The road west from Allentown on present-day College Heights Boulevard, Broadway, Tilghman Street, and Main Street, was designated LR 443 in 1925, and soon the entire shortcut between Allentown and Harrisburg was designated Pennsylvania Route 43.

In early 1931, The New York Times recommended using this cutoff, and the American Association of State Highway and Transportation Officials moved US 22 to PA 43 several months later, on June 8, 1931. The Pennsylvania Department of Highways moved the William Penn Highway name to match.

Tilghman Street and Union Boulevard, then called Union Street, were once local streets in Allentown and Bethlehem, with no bridge over the Lehigh River connecting them; Allentown built the bridge in 1929.

Prior to 1931, there were no state highways in Allentown or a number of other major cities in the state. However, the state did define paths through these cities for the public; in Allentown, US 22 used Hamilton Street, and PA 43 entered on Liberty Street and turned south on 17th Street to reach Hamilton Street.

On June 22, 1931, the Pennsylvania General Assembly passed a law defining state highways through these cities and changing routes in other cities. LR 443 was defined to use College Heights Boulevard and Tilghman Street to 15th Street, where LR 157 continued along Tilghman Street and Union Boulevard to the Allentown-Bethlehem line. LR 159 was redefined to begin at the same point, continuing on Union Boulevard to Main Street in downtown Bethlehem and beyond to Easton. The newest part of Tilghman Street includes the bridge over Little Lehigh Creek in Trexler Park west of Cedar Crest Boulevard, which was built it 1936, and bypasses the older route via Broadway and College Heights Boulevard.

Tilghman Street and Union Boulevard have become major long-distance traffic routes in the Lehigh Valley. as of 1999, the two roads have a combined eight diners, dating back to the early 20th century, that serve as a historical reminder of its past.

In addition to US 22, Tilghman Street also carried U.S. Route 309 and PA Route 29 between 19th Street and 7th Street. They were moved from Hamilton Street with US 22 in 1931, and to a freeway bypass of Allentown in the late 1950s. The Lehigh Valley Thruway, a freeway taking US 22 around Allentown and Bethlehem to the north, was opened on September 21, 1954.

In the 1950s, with the opening of these two highways and the western extension of the Thruway, no signed Traffic Routes remained on Tilghman Street and Union Boulevard. The road was still maintained by the state, and it still carried LR 443, LR 157, and LR 159 through the cities, since the Thruway was assigned a new number — LR 772 — but west of the crossing at Kuhnsville, LR 443 was moved to the freeway, and the old route became LR Old 443, later LR 443 Parallel.

In the late 1970s, the road west of Church Street in Fogelsville, which was also a state highway (LR 39084), was removed from the state highway system. A gap in LR 159 through downtown Bethlehem was created in 1971, at the same time as Washington Avenue and Stefko Boulevard were added to the system as a bypass, with Union Boulevard east of Pennsylvania Route 378 becoming a city street.

In 1987, when the new Location Referencing System was adopted, only the portion of Tilghman Street and Union Boulevard between Church Street and PA 378 was assigned State Route 1002.

=== 21st century ===
In late October 2012, the Tilghman Street Bridge over the Lehigh River was repaved in order to accommodate construction vehicles for the long-awaited beginning of the American Parkway Bridge project.

== Route description ==
=== Tilghman Street ===
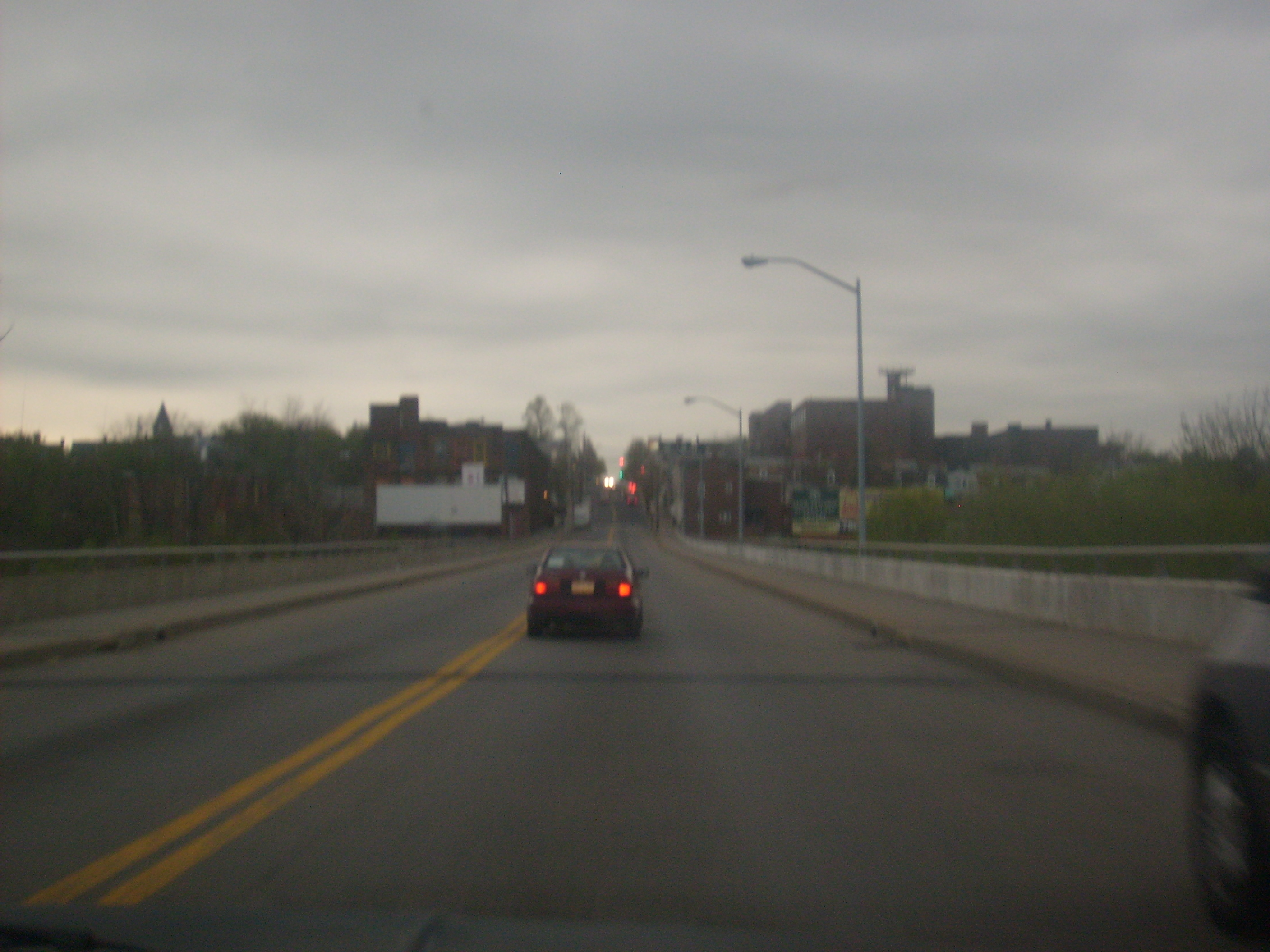
Tilghman Street Bridge in east-side Allentown in April 2007

SR 1002 begins at an intersection with Church and Main Streets (State Route 3014) in Fogelsville. It then proceeds east for three-tenths of a mile (0.5 km) as Main Street to an intersection with Pennsylvania Route 100. Upon crossing SR 100, SR 1002 becomes Tilghman Street. As Tilghman Street approaches the limited-access U.S. Route 22, the road splits into two carriageways in preparation for an interchange with US 22, northeast of where US 22 separates from Interstate 78. Past the interchange with US 22, Tilghman Street returns to an undivided roadway and enters Cetronia.

At an intersection with Werley Road, SR 1002 connects to Interstate 476, the Northeast Extension of the Pennsylvania Turnpike, via a ramp leading to the toll plaza for the nearby I-476/US 22 interchange. SR 1002 continues to the southeast, passing over the turnpike. After turning to the northeast, Tilghman Street has a cloverleaf interchange with Pennsylvania Route 309. SR 1002 enters Allentown one quarter mile west of this interchange just before its intersection with 40th Street. Tilghman Street then re-enters South Whitehall for about one block as it crosses Cedar Crest Boulevard, a local north–south arterial, before entering into the city's incorporated limits for a second time.

In Allentown, Tilghman Street (SR 1002) crosses more than 30 major streets in the city. In the more populated part of the city, SR 1002 intersects the 6th and 7th street one-way couplet forming Pennsylvania Route 145.

East of 4th Street, the road uses the Tilghman Street Bridge to cross Jordan Creek and American Parkway. After intersecting Front Street, SR 1002 crosses the Lehigh River on the Tilghman Street Viaduct and becomes Union Boulevard. Tilghman Street is still found in east-side Allentown, but it is not connected to SR 1002 in west-side, center city, and upper east-side Allentown.

=== Union Boulevard ===
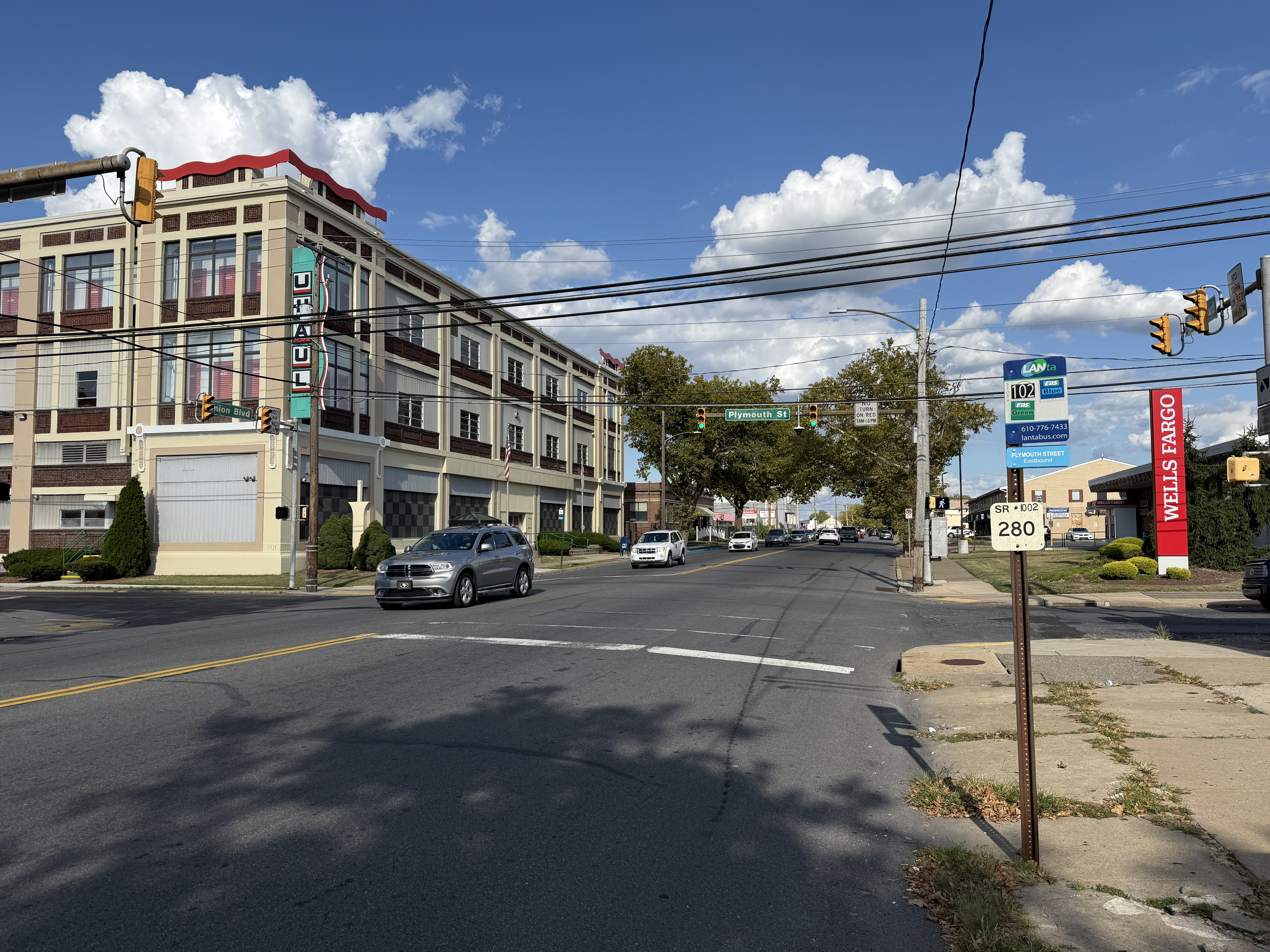
SR 1002 (Union Boulevard) eastbound in Allentown

East of the Tilghman Street Viaduct, SR 1002 traverses numerous streets in the eastern section of Allentown. After the intersection with Fenwick Street, SR 1002 has a solid west–east routing. East of the Irving Street intersection, SR 1002 intersects Airport Road, the main road to Lehigh Valley International Airport. Briefly east of Airport Road, Union Boulevard traverses the other streets of east Allentown. SR 1002 enters the city of Bethlehem from the west as West Union Boulevard.

Approximately 1,500 feet east of the Allentown's border with Bethlehem, Eaton Avenue is concurrent with SR 1002 for one-tenth of a mile. The route turns to the south near the junction with Pennsylvania Avenue before taking an increasingly eastern alignment. Third Avenue provides access to and from PA 378 south. SR 1002 terminates at an interchange with Pennsylvania Route 378.

The highway has access to PA 378 north. The designation continues as W. Union Boulevard upon entering the eastern sections of Bethlehem, in Northampton County.

== Major intersections ==
The entire route is in Lehigh County.

Location	mi	km	Destinations	Notes
Upper Macungie Township	0.000	0.000	SR 3014 (Church Street)	
Upper Macungie Township	0.332	0.534	PA 100 – Tamaqua, Trexlertown	
Upper Macungie Township	2.771	4.459	US 22 (Lehigh Valley Thruway) – Harrisburg, Allentown	Interchange; same-directional access only
South Whitehall Township	3.249	5.229	I-476 Toll / Penna Turnpike NE Extension – Scranton, Philadelphia	Entrance ramp to I-476 / Penna Turnpike NE Extension exit 56 (Lehigh Valley); E-ZPass or toll-by-plate; no access to SR 1002 from I-476
South Whitehall Township	4.261	6.857	PA 309 – Tamaqua, Quakertown	Cloverleaf interchange
South Whitehall Township	5.735	9.230	SR 1019 (Cedar Crest Boulevard) to US 22 – Balliettsville, Dorneyville	Formerly PA 229
Allentown	7.237	11.647	SR 1017 north (19th Street)	Formerly US 309 and PA 29
Allentown	7.708	12.405	SR 2003 south (15th Street) – Reading	Formerly part of US 222
Allentown	8.062	12.975	12th Street	Formerly US 309 Bypass
Allentown	8.625	13.881	PA 145 south (7th Street) – Quakertown, Philadelphia	
Allentown	8.728	14.046	PA 145 north (6th Street)	
Allentown	9.072	14.600	Tilghman Street Viaduct over the Lehigh River	Tilghman Street becomes Union Boulevard at the east end of the bridge
Allentown	9.774	15.730	SR 1003 north (Airport Road) to US 22	Formerly part of PA 987; access to LVI Airport
Bethlehem	13.684	22.022	SR 1001 south (3rd Avenue) to PA 378 south	Formerly part of PA 191; provides access to and from PA 378 south
Bethlehem	13.794	22.199	PA 378 north	Interchange with single ramp to PA 378 north; traffic from PA 378 north exits at Main Street (former routing of PA 191 north) in downtown Bethlehem
1.000 mi = 1.609 km; 1.000 km = 0.621 mi: Electronic toll collection; Incomplete access
