= Cetronia, Pennsylvania =

Unincorporated community in Pennsylvania, US

- Census-designated place
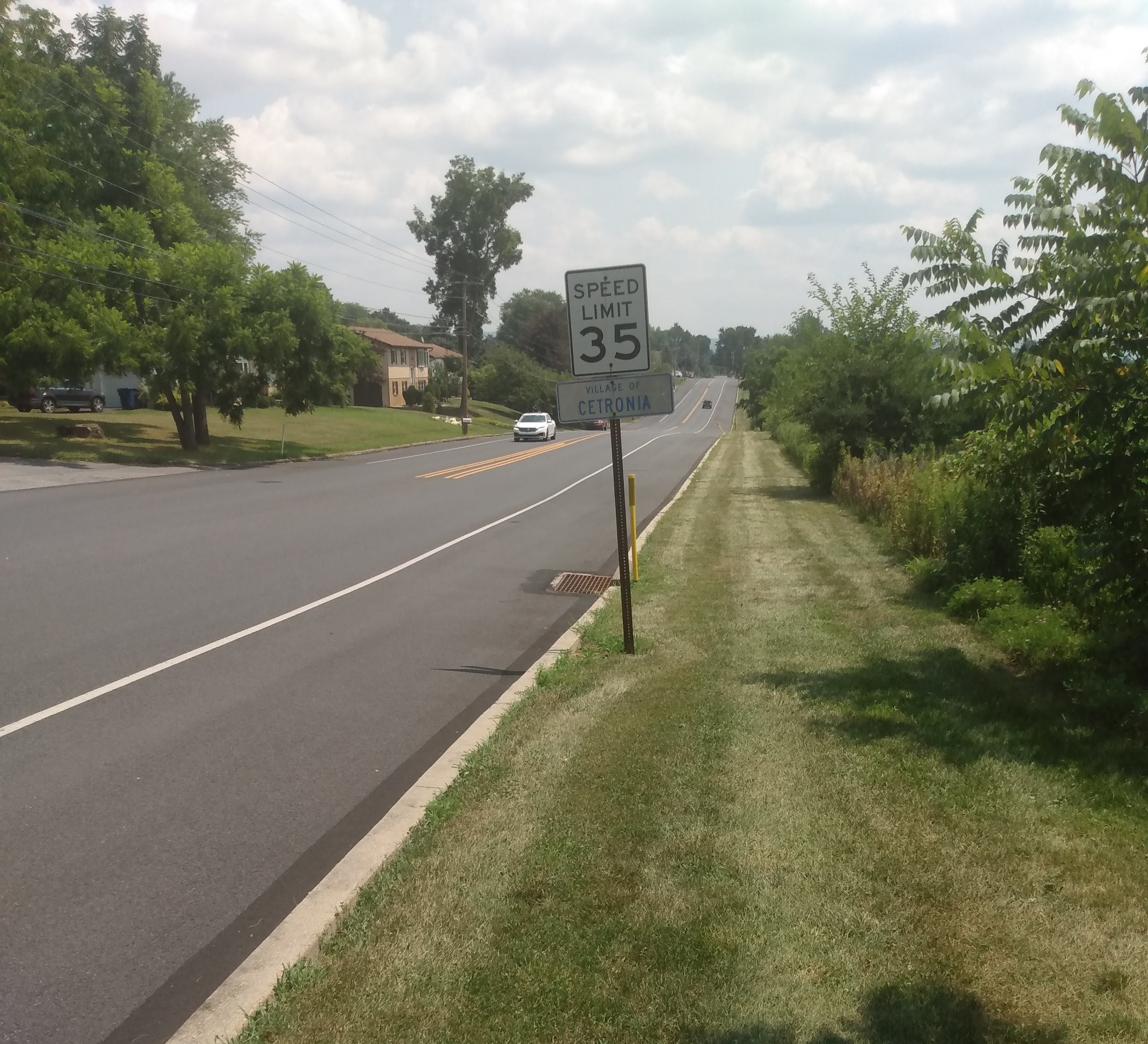
- Cetronia in July 2021

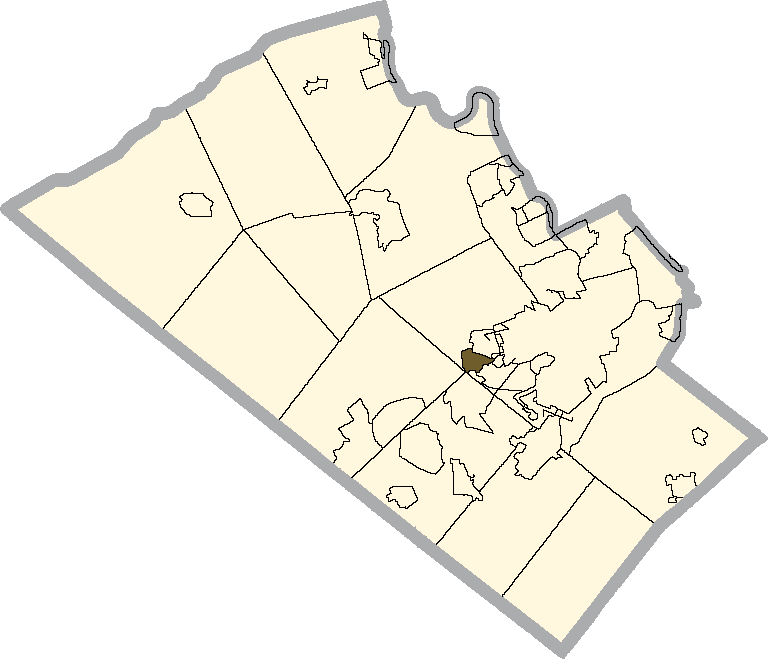
- Location of Cetronia in Lehigh County, Pennsylvania

- Location of Cetronia in Pennsylvania Location in the United States
- Coordinates: 40°35′8″N 75°32′9″W
- Country: United States
- State: Pennsylvania
- County: Lehigh
- Township: South Whitehall

Area
  - Census-designated place: 0.81 sq mi (2.10 km^{2})
  - Land: 0.81 sq mi (2.10 km^{2})
  - Water: 0 sq mi (0.00 km^{2})
- Elevation: 363 ft (111 m)

Population (2020)
  - Census-designated place: 2,421
  - Density: 2,984.8/sq mi (1,152.43/km^{2})
  - Metro: 865,310 (US: 68th)
- Time zone: UTC-5 (EST)
  - Summer (DST): UTC-4 (EDT)
- ZIP Code: 18104
- Area codes: 610 and 484
- FIPS code: 42-12424
- GNIS feature ID: 2628811
- Primary airport: Lehigh Valley International Airport
- Major hospital: Lehigh Valley Hospital–Cedar Crest
- School district: Parkland

Cetronia is a census-designated place (CDP) in South Whitehall Township, Pennsylvania, located near Allentown. As of the 2020 census, its population was 2,421.

Cetronia is part of the Lehigh Valley metropolitan area, which had a population of 861,899 and was the 68th-most populous metropolitan area in the U.S. as of the 2020 census.

== Geography ==
Cetronia is in central Lehigh County in the southern part of South Whitehall Township. It is bordered to the north by Allentown and to the southeast by Dorneyville and Dorney Park & Wildwater Kingdom. State Route 1002, also known as Tilghman Street, runs through Cetronia. Pennsylvania Route 309 forms the western boundary of the community, and Cedar Crest Boulevard borders its far eastern end.

Interstate 78 runs southwest of Cetronia prior to its merge with PA Route 309. Interstate 476, the Northeast Extension of the Pennsylvania Turnpike, runs just west of Cetronia, separating it from Krocksville, Kuhnsville, and Ruppsville. US 22, the Lehigh Valley Thruway, passes 1 mile (1.6 km) north of Cetronia, separating it from the Crackersport and Walbert area. I-476 has an interchange with US 22 at the western edge of Cetronia, which uses the Allentown ZIP code of 18104.

According to the U.S. Census Bureau, Cetronia has an area of 0.77 square miles (2.0 km^{2}), all land. Cedar Creek, an eastward-flowing tributary of Little Lehigh Creek, forms part of the southern boundary of the CDP. The community is part of the watershed of the Lehigh River, flowing to the Delaware River.

Tilghman Square Shopping Center and a number of restaurants, medical offices, and car dealerships are located in the Cetronia area. The Census Bureau uses PA Route 309 and Tilghman Street as the western and northern boundaries of the CDP respectively, however, and therefore most of these businesses are excluded from the CDP definition and totals.

Cetronia Ambulance Corps and the volunteer Cetronia Fire Department provide first responder services to Cetronia and the surrounding area.

Historical population
Census	Pop.	Note	%±
2000	1,952		—
2010	2,115		8.4%
2020	2,421		14.5%
U.S. Decennial Census
