= Kuhnsville, Pennsylvania =

Unincorporated community in Pennsylvania, US

- Unincorporated community
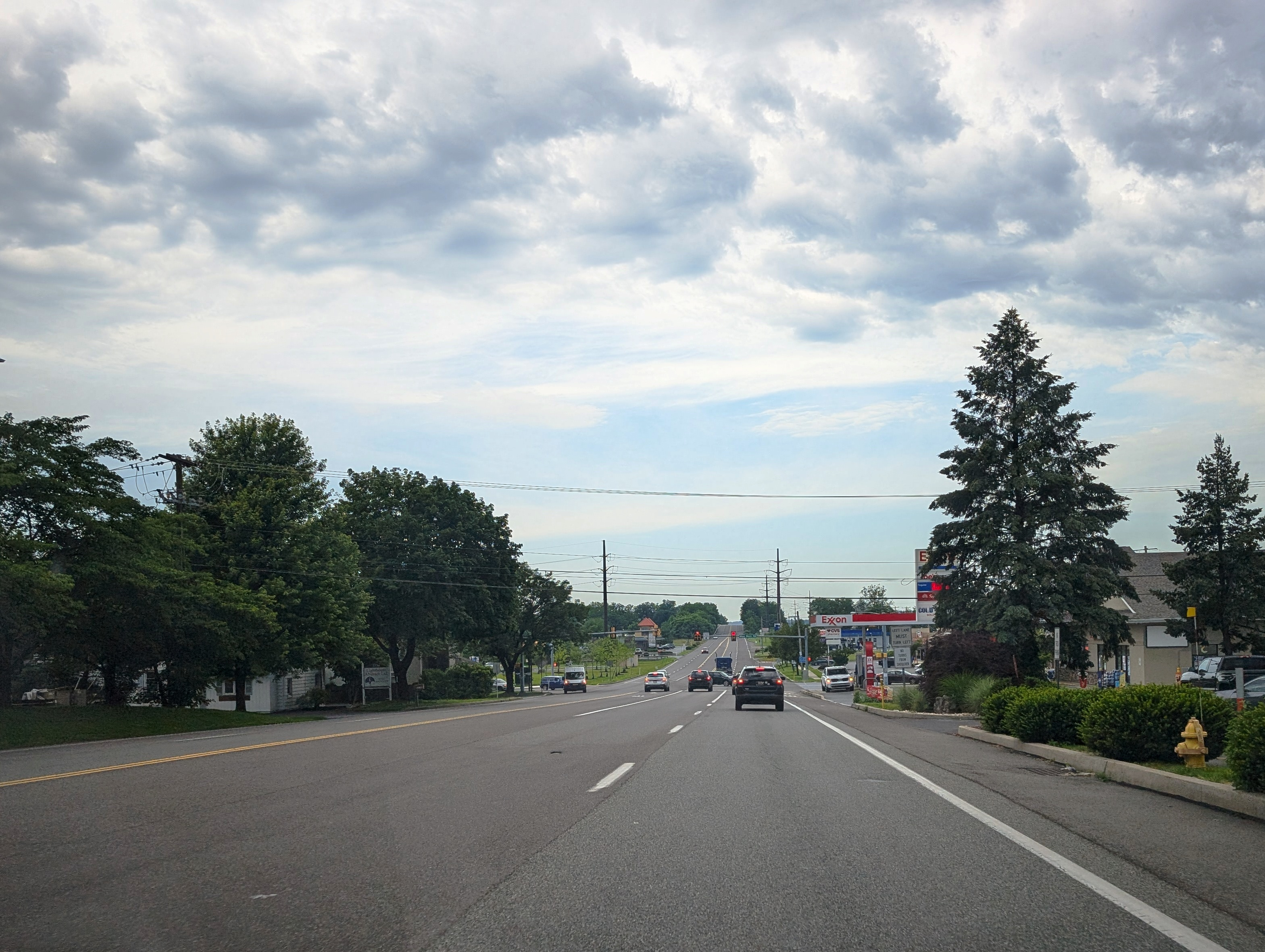
- Tilghman Street westbound in Kuhnsville

- Location within Pennsylvania
- Coordinates: 40°35′32″N 75°35′20″W
- Country: United States
- State: Pennsylvania
- County: Lehigh
- Township: Upper Macungie Township
- Elevation: 495 ft (151 m)

Population
  - Metro: 865,310 (US: 68th)
- Time zone: UTC-5 (Eastern (EST))
  - Summer (DST): UTC-4 (EDT)
- ZIP Code: 18104
- Area codes: 610 and 484
- GNIS feature ID: 1178702
- Primary airport: Lehigh Valley International Airport
- Major hospital: Lehigh Valley Hospital–Cedar Crest
- School district: Parkland

Kuhnsville is a small, unincorporated village in Upper Macungie Township in Lehigh County, Pennsylvania. It is part of the Lehigh Valley, which has a population of 861,899 and is the 68th-most populous metropolitan area in the U.S. as of the 2020 census.

== Geography ==
Along with the adjacent villages of Chapmans (immediately west) and Ruppsville (southwest), Kuhnsville forms the eastern edge of the transportation and warehousing business district centered on Fogelsville. It uses the Allentown ZIP Code of 18104.

Kuhnsville is the western terminus of the Lehigh Valley Thruway. The original freeway ended here, where current US 22 now has a partial interchange with Tilghman Street. The exit sign on westbound US 22 at this interchange reads "Kuhnsville". The Thruway now continues one half mile west to the interchange where US 22 westbound begins its concurrency with I-78.

Kuhnsville is located approximately a mile east of Fogelsville. Tilghman Street is the main surface street of the area, passing from Fogelsville through Chapmans and Kuhnsville on its way to Cetronia and Allentown. Interstate 476, the Northeast Extension of the Pennsylvania Turnpike, forms the informal boundary between this area and the Cetronia and Walbert areas to the east. I-476 has an interchange with US 22 at the eastern edge of Kuhnsville.
