= Pennsylvania Route 378 =

State highway in Pennsylvania, US

Pennsylvania Route 378

Route information
- Maintained by PennDOT
- Length: 9.555 mi (15.377 km)
- Existed: 1971–present

Major junctions
- South end: PA 309 in Center Valley
- PA 412 in Bethlehem
- North end: US 22 in Bethlehem

Location
- Country: United States
- State: Pennsylvania
- Counties: Lehigh, Northampton

Highway system
- Pennsylvania State Route System; Interstate; US; State; Scenic; Legislative
← PA 377	→ I-380

Pennsylvania Route 378 (PA 378) is a state highway in Lehigh and Northampton counties in the Lehigh Valley region of the U.S. state of Pennsylvania. The southern terminus is at PA 309 in Center Valley. Its northern terminus is at U.S. Route 22 (US 22) in Bethlehem. The route heads north from PA 309 as a two-lane undivided road through Upper Saucon Township and Lower Saucon Township before crossing South Mountain into Bethlehem. Here, PA 378 follows city streets through Bethlehem's South Side, intersecting the northern terminus of PA 412. The route becomes a four-lane freeway and crosses the Lehigh River before continuing north to US 22. PA 378 is the only highway from US 22 to Center City Bethlehem.

The portion of PA 378 south of Bethlehem was originally numbered as PA 12 in 1928 and renumbered to PA 191 in 1961. Construction on the freeway from West Broad Street to US 22 began in 1966 and finished two years later. This freeway was numbered Interstate 378 (I-378) and served as a spur of I-78, which was to be routed along the US 22 freeway.

I-78 was instead built as a new route to the south of Bethlehem, and I-378 was downgraded to state route status in 1971. Three years later, the PA 378 designation replaced PA 191 from Center Valley to Spring Street in Bethlehem. The state did not remove the exit tabs for the freeway section, making PA 378 one of only a few state freeways with exit numbers; another such freeway is PA 309 in Wilkes-Barre. The exit numbers also go in the wrong direction: Exit 3 is south of Exit 1, most likely due to the freeway being built when Pennsylvania still practiced sequential exit numbering. In 2009, the portion north of Lehigh River was named the Fred B. Rooney Highway after Fred B. Rooney.

== Route description ==
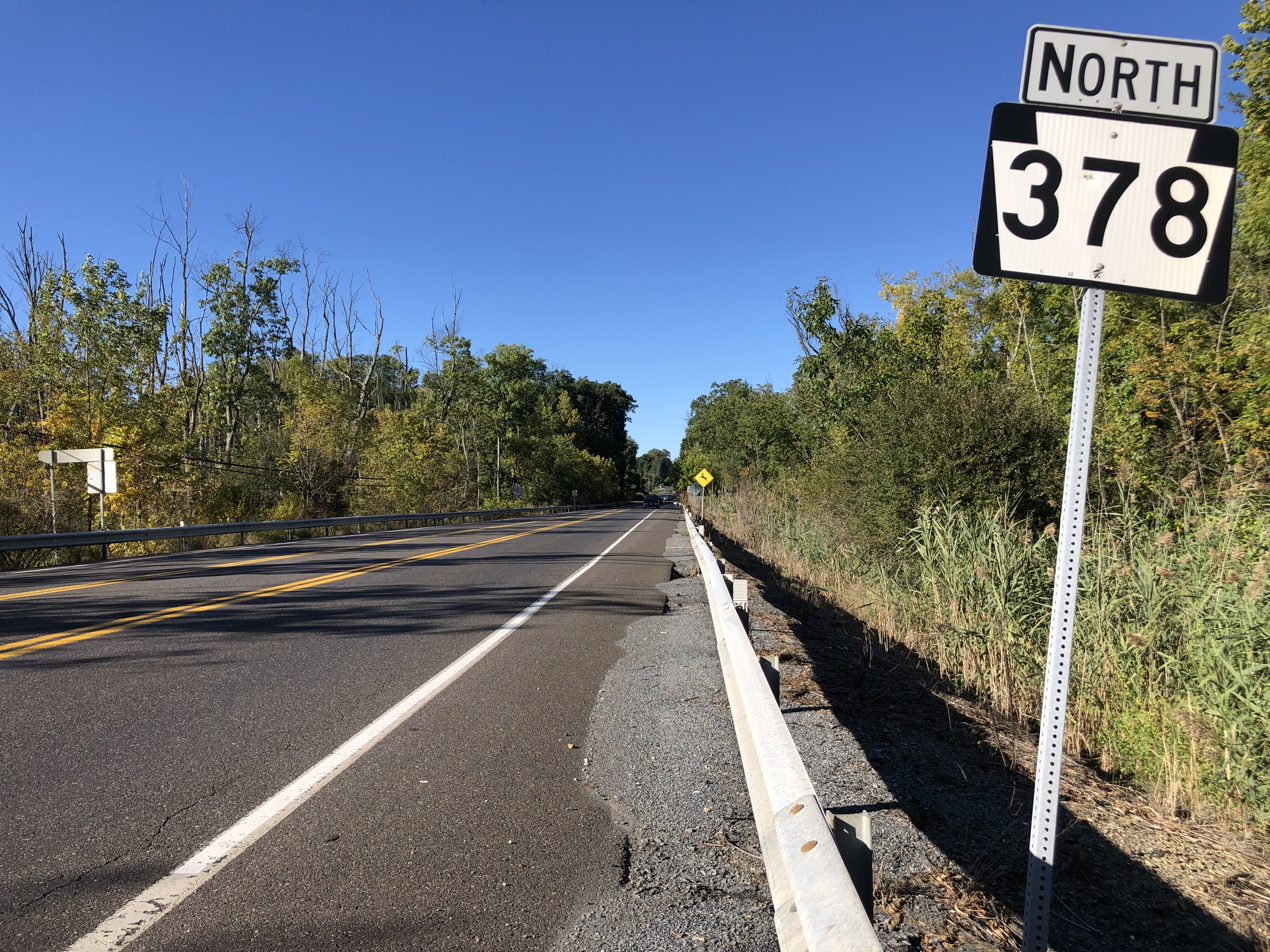
PA 378 northbound in Upper Saucon Township

PA 378 begins at two separate intersections with PA 309 in Center Valley in Upper Saucon Township, Lehigh County, in the Lehigh Valley. The route heads northward as a three-lane road with a center left-turn lane, passing through Center Valley and paralleling Old Bethlehem Pike. The road runs through a mix of farm fields and woods with residential and commercial development. After an intersection with Preston Lane, PA 378 turns to the north-northeast. Farther north, the highway crosses Saucon Creek and passes to the west of the Saucon Valley Country Club. At the intersection with Osgood Avenue, PA 378 turns to the northeast, crossing the Old Bethlehem Pike soon after. After crossing Saucon Valley Road, the highway comes to an intersection with Center Valley Parkway, a four-lane expressway.

After that, the highway enters Lower Saucon Township in Northampton County and crosses under I-78 without an interchange. Past this, PA 378 heads north through Seidersville, where it passes homes and businesses as a four-lane road parallel to Old Philadelphia Pike. The road traverses South Mountain, where it runs through forested areas with some homes. Descending the mountain, PA 378 bends northwestward as a four-lane road known as Wyandotte Street until leaving the University Heights area near Holy Ghost Cemetery. PA 378 continues into the city of Bethlehem, where it turns northward into residential areas as a two-lane road and is called Wyandotte Street. In the South Side section of the city, PA 378 intersects with the northern terminus of PA 412 (Broadway). The route continues northward and intersects a ramp to 3rd Street that provides access to PA 412, at which point it widens to four lanes. PA 378 passes over Norfolk Southern's Lehigh Line before crossing the Lehigh River on the Hill to Hill Bridge.

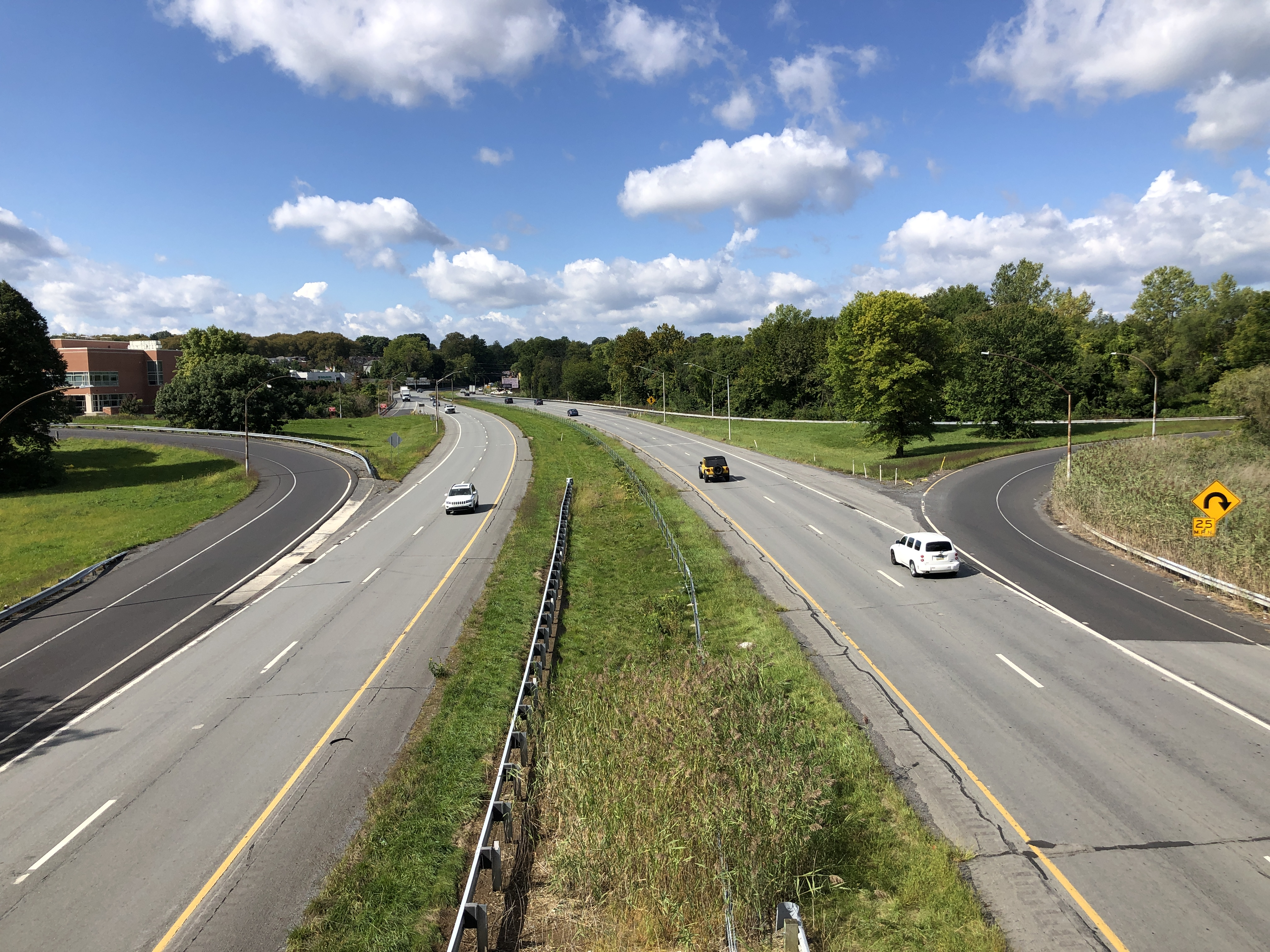
PA 378 northbound at the interchange with Eighth Avenue in Bethlehem

PA 378 heads northward across the Hill to Hill Bridge, at which point it crosses back into Lehigh County. The route crosses over West Lehigh Street and intersects with the off-ramp to Main Street in Bethlehem. There was formerly a ramp to 2nd Avenue, but that has been closed and is only used by pedestrians. After this interchange, PA 378 becomes a four-lane freeway and is named the Fred B. Rooney Highway. The highway continues northward through the city, crossing under West Broad Street and reaching a southbound interchange with North Street, which leads to Center City and Third Avenue. The freeway continues northward, crossing over and receiving an on-ramp from Union Boulevard.

The road turns to the northwest and interchanges with Eighth Avenue at exit 2E and exit 2W northbound and exit 2 southbound. PA 378 turns westward through Bethlehem, paralleling Union Boulevard and crossing under Fourteenth Avenue. The route then turns northward, crossing under Eaton Avenue and a Norfolk Southern rail line and passing the Hal Fenicle Memorial Park. PA 378 continues northbound, interchanging with and crossing under Catasauqua Road. After running to the southwest of Lehigh Valley Hospital–Muhlenberg, the freeway ends at an interchange with US 22 (Lehigh Valley Thruway).

== History ==
Interstate 378
- Location: Bethlehem
- Existed: 1968–1971

The portion of PA 378 south of Spring Street in Bethlehem was originally designated in the 1928 numbering as an alignment of PA 12, a route crossing through Northampton and Monroe Counties. On April 17, 1961, PA 12 was decommissioned in favor of PA 191, a 90-mile-long (140 km) highway from Center Valley to the New York state line on the Delaware River. In 1974, following the decommissioning of I-378 to PA 378, PA 191 had its southern terminus moved to US 22 in Brodhead, and the former alignment between Center Valley and Bethlehem became a southern, non-expressway extension of PA 378.

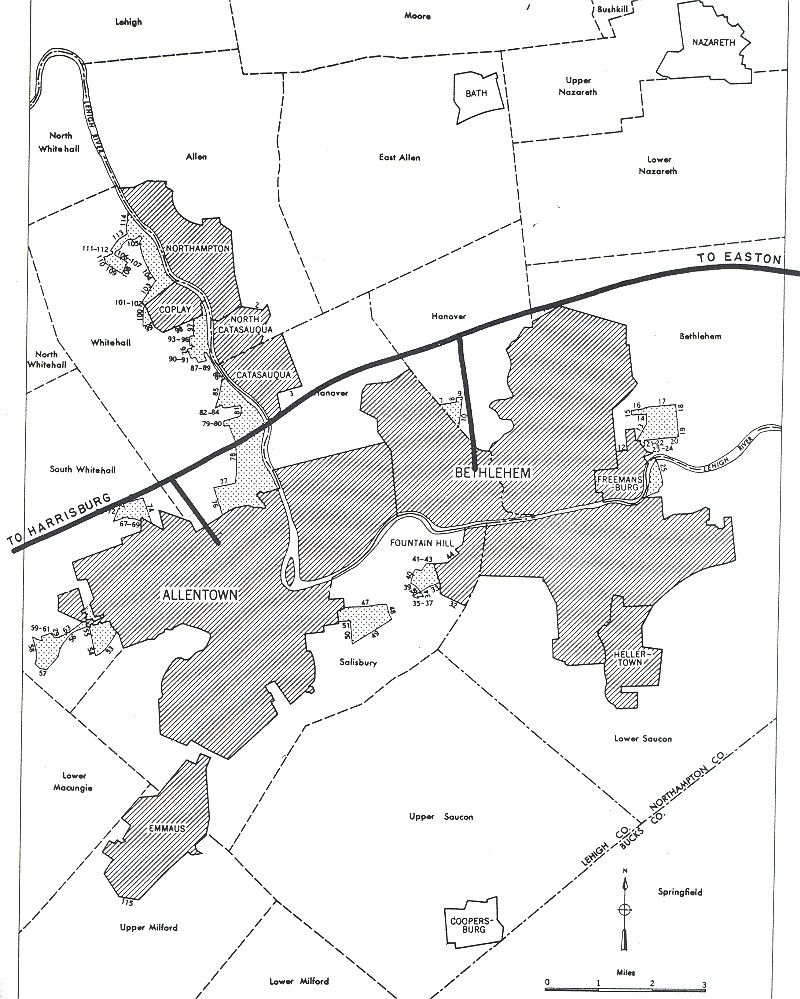
Allentown-Bethlehem map from 1955, PA 378 is the road heading into Bethlehem, and I-178 is heading into Allentown

The current alignment of PA 378 was first constructed from Spring Street in Bethlehem to the current interchange with the Lehigh Valley Thruway. As part of the Interstate Highway System, the Lehigh Valley Thruway was expected to be designated I-78. Upon completion of the freeway in 1968, the new highway was designated I-378, a spur off of I-78. However, in 1970, as I-78 was realigned to a new bypass to the south of Bethlehem, I-378 was decommissioned and replaced with the alignment of PA 378 the following year.

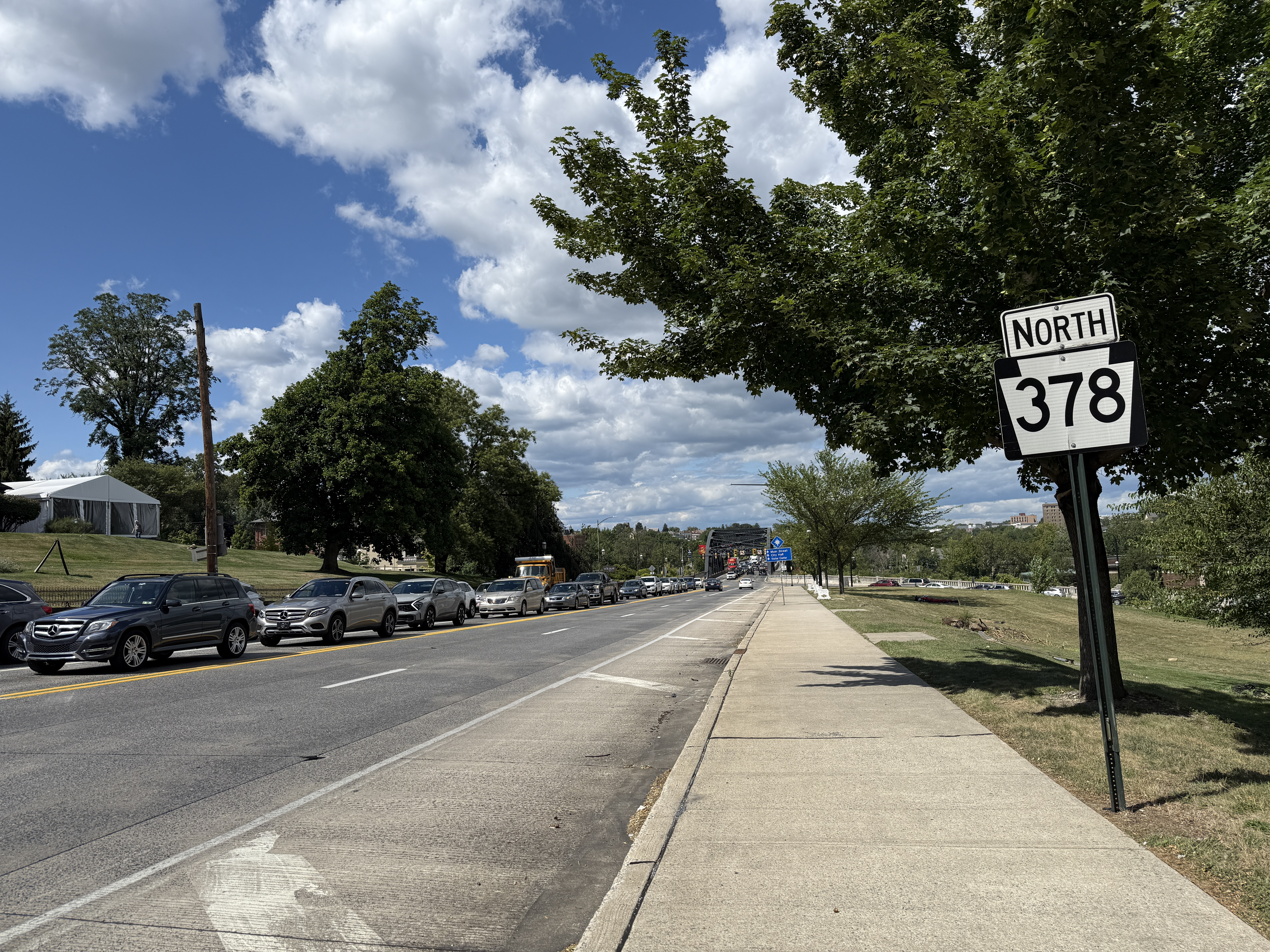
PA 378 northbound past 3rd Street in Bethlehem

Since completion, PA 378 has undergone little major change, but the highway has undergone several rehabilitations. The Hill to Hill Bridge received a minor fire during reconstruction of the bridge, when a piece of equipment had its motor catch fire on April 13, 2009, when the bridge was undergoing re-painting. The bridge repainting was completed on May 15, 2009, after the closing of a bridge and was re-opened later due to rainfall in the area.

On September 23, 2009, the Pennsylvania Department of Transportation announced plans and designs for an upgrade and redesign of PA 378 through Bethlehem at its interchange with West Third Street, although this met public criticism. Part of the project, construction of a new ramp from Wyandotte Street to West Third Street, was completed in September 2011. Completion of the widening of West Third Street and PA 412 was completed later in 2011. The $5.1 million project will also include a widening of PA 412 between Exit 67 on I-78 and Daly Avenue in Bethlehem to two lanes in each direction. On November 21, 2009, the project was given funding from the American Recovery and Reinvestment Act of 2009 signed by President Barack Obama in 2009. The Pennsylvania Department of Transportation received $1 billion worth of funding from the act.

== Major intersections ==
County	Location	mi	km	Exit	Destinations	Notes
Lehigh	Upper Saucon Township	0.000	0.000		PA 309 (Main Street) – Quakertown, Philadelphia, Allentown	Southern terminus
Northampton	Bethlehem	5.641	9.078		PA 412 south (Broadway) – Hellertown	Northern terminus of PA 412
Northampton	Bethlehem	5.993	9.645		To Third Street / I-78 / PA 412 south	Southbound exit and northbound entrance; access via 2nd Street Ramp
Lehigh	Bethlehem	6.315	10.163	Southern end of freeway section		
Lehigh	Bethlehem	6.315	10.163		Main Street	Northbound exit only; former PA 191; no trucks
Lehigh	Bethlehem	6.774	10.902	3	Center City	Southbound exit and entrance; access via Third Avenue; access to Historic Bethlehem
Lehigh	Bethlehem	6.795	10.935		West Union Boulevard (SR 1002)	Northbound entrance only
Lehigh	Bethlehem	7.368	11.858	2	Eighth Avenue	Signed as exits 2E (north) and 2W (south) northbound
Lehigh	Bethlehem	8.858	14.256	1	Catasauqua Road	Southbound exit and entrance
Lehigh	Bethlehem	9.555	15.377		US 22 – Allentown, Easton	Northern terminus; access to Schoenersville Road
1.000 mi = 1.609 km; 1.000 km = 0.621 mi: Incomplete access
