= Trexlertown, Pennsylvania =

Unincorporated community in Pennsylvania, US

- Census-designated place
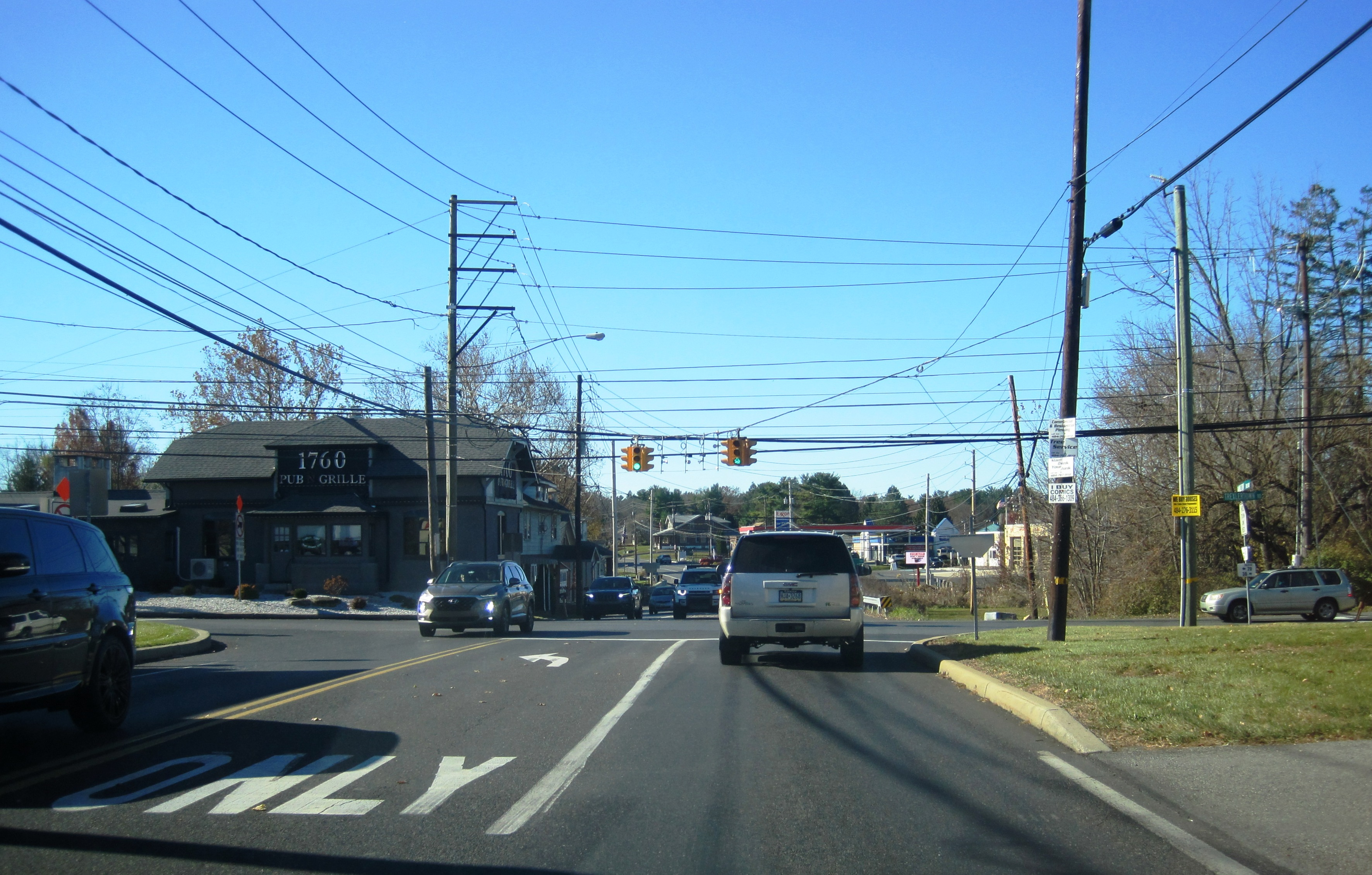
- Trexlertown at the intersection of Hamilton Boulevard and Trexlertown Road

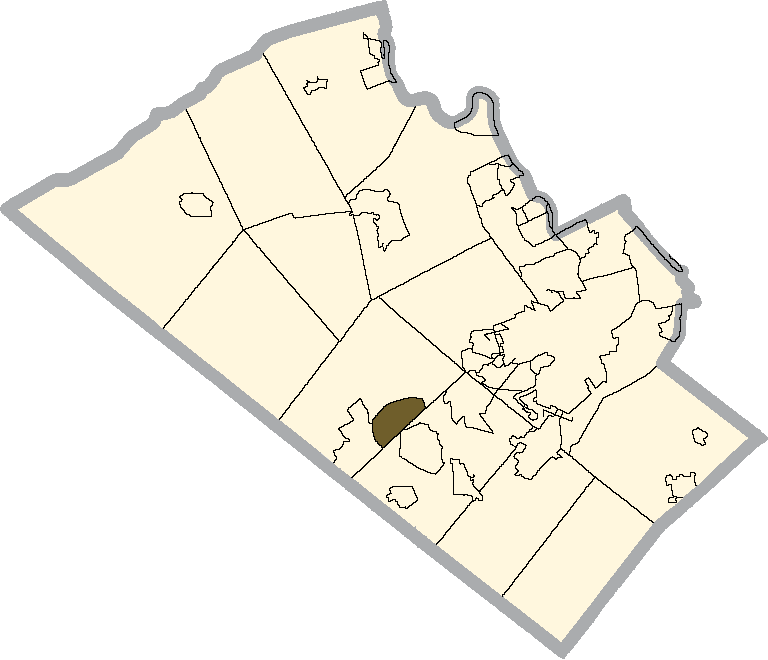
- Location of Trexlertown in Lehigh County, Pennsylvania

- Location of Trexlertown in Pennsylvania Location in the United States
- Coordinates: 40°32′53″N 75°36′21″W
- Country: United States
- State: Pennsylvania
- County: Lehigh
- Township: Upper Macungie

Area
  - Census-designated place: 2.09 sq mi (5.42 km^{2})
  - Land: 2.08 sq mi (5.38 km^{2})
  - Water: 0.015 sq mi (0.04 km^{2})
- Elevation: 397 ft (121 m)

Population (2020)
  - Census-designated place: 2,382
  - Density: 1,147.5/sq mi (443.06/km^{2})
  - Metro: 865,310 (US: 68th)
- Time zone: UTC-5 (Eastern (EST))
  - Summer (DST): UTC-4 (EDT)
- ZIP Code: 18087
- Area codes: 610 and 484
- FIPS code: 42-77488
- GNIS feature ID: 1189757
- Primary airport: Lehigh Valley International Airport
- Major hospital: Lehigh Valley Hospital–Cedar Crest
- School district: Parkland

Trexlertown is an unincorporated community and census-designated place (CDP) in Upper Macungie Township, Pennsylvania. As of the 2020 census, the population was 2,382. It is part of the Lehigh Valley, which had a population of 861,899 and was the 68th-most populous metropolitan area in the U.S. as of the 2020 census, and lies between Breinigsville and Wescosville.

The global corporate headquarters of Air Products is located immediately across the Trexlertown's eastern border with Allentown. Lehigh Valley Velodrome, a velodrome for professional and amateur cycling, also is located next to Trexlertown, in Breinigsville.

== History ==
Jeremiah Trexler obtained land adjoining that of his father in present-day Upper Macungie Township, where he operated a tavern as early as in 1732. Two years later, in 1734, a road was developed from his Upper Macungie Township tavern south through North Wales to Philadelphia.

As was the custom of the time, a village grew around the tavern, and the village came to be known as Trexlertown in honor of Trexler's role in its founding.

Historical population
Census	Pop.	Note	%±
2000	957		—
2010	1,988		107.7%
2020	2,382		19.8%
U.S. Decennial Census

== Geography ==
Trexlertown is located southwest of the center of Lehigh County along the southeastern edge of Upper Macungie Township at an altitude of 397 feet (121 m). It is bordered to the southwest by Breinigsville and to the southeast by Lower Macungie Township. U.S. Route 222 forms the northern edge of the community; US 222 leads northeast 3 miles (5 km) to its terminus at Interstate 78 outside of Allentown and southwest 30 miles (48 km) to Reading. Pennsylvania Route 100 forms the western edge of Trexlertown, leading north 11 miles (18 km) to its terminus at PA 309 near Pleasant Corners and south 27 miles (43 km) to Pottstown.

According to the U.S. Census Bureau, Trexlertown has a total area of 2.1 square miles (5.4 km^{2}), of which 0.02 square miles (0.04 km^{2}), or 0.80%, are water. Schaefer Run and Iron Run join in the southwestern part of the community to form Spring Creek, a southwestward-flowing tributary of Little Lehigh Creek and part of the Lehigh River watershed.

== Education ==
Trexlertown is part of the Parkland School District, and students in grades nine through 12 attend Parkland High School.
