= Fogelsville, Pennsylvania =

Unincorporated community in Pennsylvania, US

- Unincorporated community
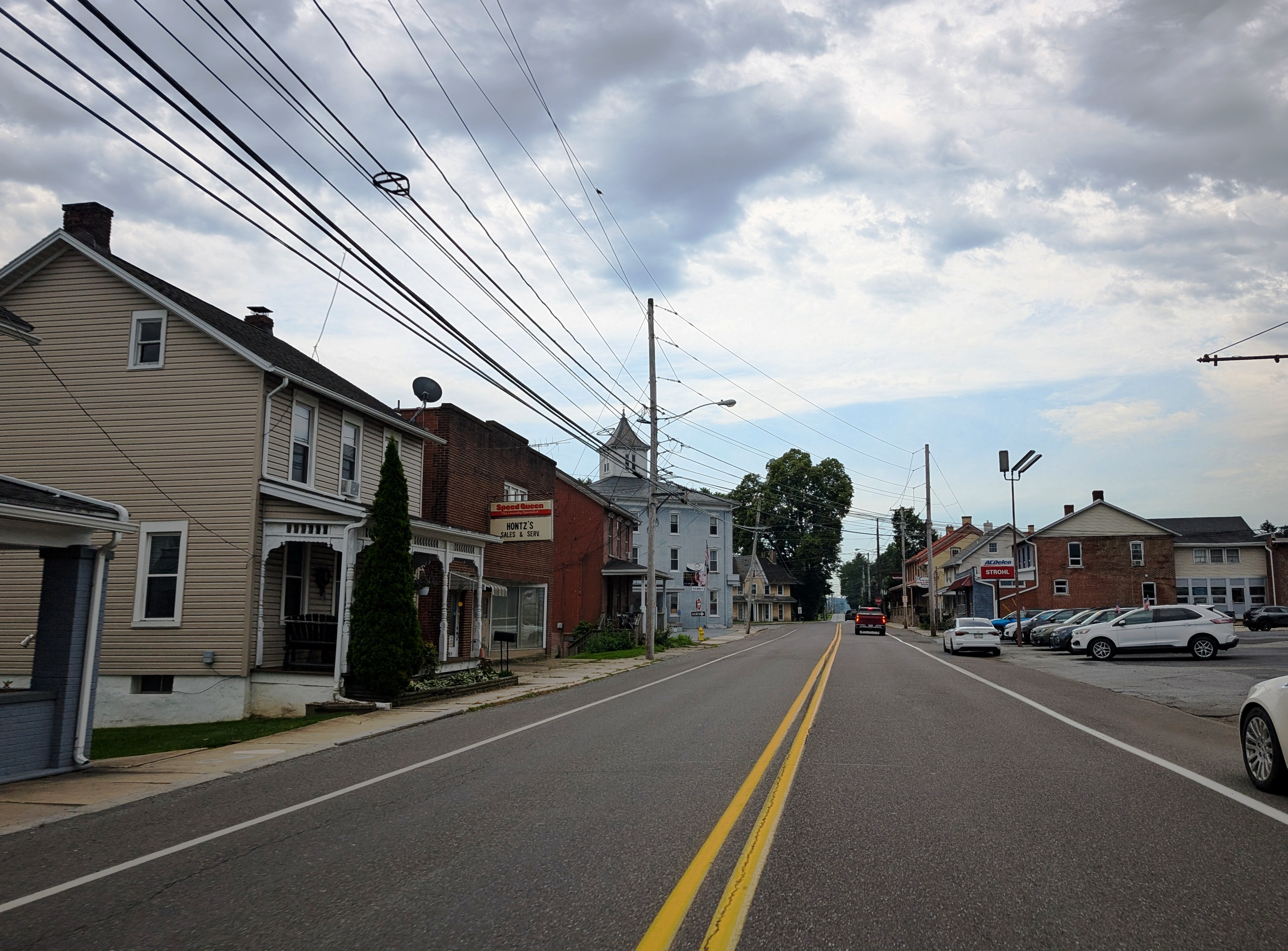
- Fogelsville along westbound Main Street

- Location within Pennsylvania Location within the United States
- Coordinates: 40°34′59″N 75°37′58″W
- Country: United States
- State: Pennsylvania
- County: Lehigh
- Township: Upper Macungie
- Elevation: 479 ft (146 m)

Population
  - Metro: 865,310 (US: 68th)
- Time zone: UTC-5 (Eastern (EST))
  - Summer (DST): UTC-4 (EDT)
- ZIP Code: 18051
- Area codes: 610 and 484
- GNIS feature ID: 1174926
- Primary airport: Lehigh Valley International Airport
- Major hospital: Lehigh Valley Hospital–Cedar Crest
- School district: Parkland

Fogelsville is an unincorporated area in Lehigh County, Pennsylvania. It is a suburb of Allentown, in Upper Macungie Township, and is part of the Lehigh Valley, which has a population of 861,899 and was the 68th-most populous metropolitan area in the U.S. as of the 2020 census.

Fogelsville is named after Judge John Fogel, who built the first building in the area, a hotel, in 1798. The village surrounds a number of large industrial parks and corporate centers. The town is known as a large regional trucking hub. Major roads servicing Fogelsville include Interstate 78 and Pennsylvania Route 100. These two roads intersect in a cloverleaf, which is one of the busiest in the western Lehigh Valley.

Fogelsville maintains the ZIP Code 18051. Surrounding areas to the east use the Allentown ZIP Code of 18106 and areas to the south use the Breiningsville ZIP Code of 18031. Downtown Fogelsville is located at approximately 40° 34′ 59.45″ N, 75° 37′ 57.37″ W. The 1990 census reported a population of 900, although a more recent estimate places the population at approximately 3200.

== Industry ==
Fogelsville was once the terminus of the Catasauqua and Fogelsville Railroad, later extended to Rittenhouse Gap, and the site of extensive iron ore mining to supply the Lehigh Valley's iron furnaces.

== Education ==
Upper Macungie Township is in the Parkland School District.
