= Dorneyville, Pennsylvania =

Unincorporated community in Pennsylvania, US

- Census-designated place
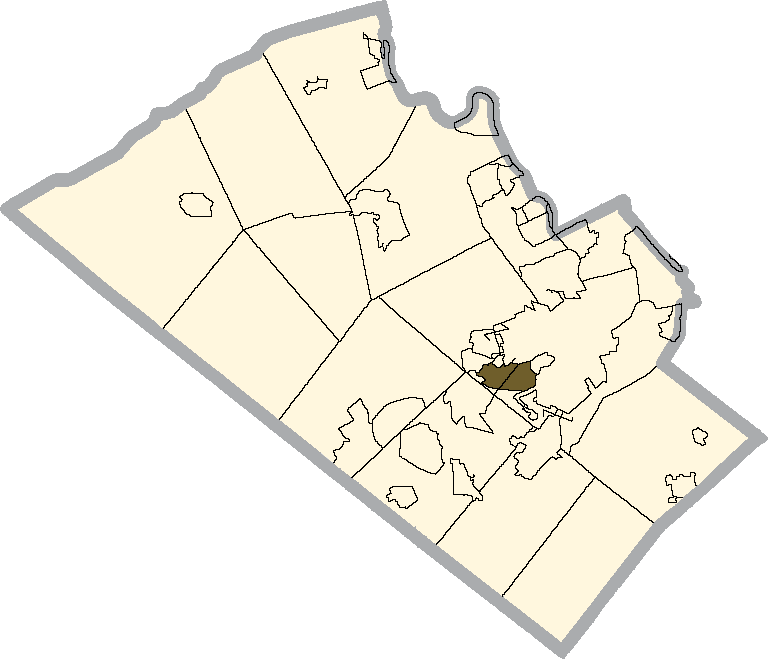
- Location of Dorneyville in Lehigh County, Pennsylvania

- Location of Dorneyville in Pennsylvania Location in the United States
- Coordinates: 40°34′30″N 75°31′11″W
- Country: United States
- State: Pennsylvania
- County: Lehigh
- Townships: South Whitehall and Salisbury

Area
  - Census-designated place: 2.18 sq mi (5.64 km^{2})
  - Land: 2.17 sq mi (5.61 km^{2})
  - Water: 0.0077 sq mi (0.02 km^{2})
- Elevation: 384 ft (117 m)

Population (2020)
  - Census-designated place: 4,850
  - Density: 2,237.9/sq mi (864.07/km^{2})
  - Metro: 865,310 (US: 68th)
- Time zone: UTC-5 (Eastern (EST))
  - Summer (DST): UTC-4 (EDT)
- ZIP Codes: 18103, 18104
- Area codes: 610 and 484
- FIPS code: 42-19584
- GNIS feature ID: 1173397
- Primary airport: Lehigh Valley International Airport
- Major hospital: Lehigh Valley Hospital–Cedar Crest
- School district: Parkland

Dorneyville is a census-designated place in Lehigh County, Pennsylvania. As of the 2020 census the population was 4,850. Dorneyville is located just west of Allentown in South Whitehall Township and Salisbury Township.

It is located off Interstate 78 and is home to the northern terminus of U.S. Route 222. It is split between the Allentown ZIP Codes of 18103 and 18104. It is part of the Lehigh Valley metropolitan area, which had a population of 861,899 and was the 68th-most populous metropolitan area in the U.S. as of the 2020 census.

Dorneyville is home to the Dorney Park & Wildwater Kingdom amusement park. The historic King George Inn, founded in 1756, also is located in Dorneyville.

== Geography ==
Dorneyville is located in south-central Lehigh County in the southern corner of South Whitehall Township and the west end of Salisbury Township. It is bordered to the northeast and east by the Allentown city limits, and to the northwest by the unincorporated community of Cetronia.

I-78 forms the southern boundary of Dorneyville, with access from Exit 54 (U.S. 222/Hamilton Boulevard) and Exit 55 (South Cedar Crest Boulevard). I-78 leads west 80 miles (130 km) to Harrisburg, the state capital, and east 90 miles (140 km) to the Holland Tunnel and Lower Manhattan. US 222 leads southwest 34 miles (55 km) to Reading. South Cedar Crest Boulevard leads south as Pennsylvania Route 29, 3 miles (5 km) to Emmaus.

According to the U.S. Census Bureau, Dorneyville has a total area of 2.0 square miles (5.2 km^{2}), of which 0.01 square miles (0.02 km^{2}), or 0.46%, are water. Cedar Creek, a northeast-flowing tributary of Little Lehigh Creek, runs through the northwest side of the Dorneyville, where Dorney Park is located. Dorneyville, through the Little Lehigh River, is part of the Lehigh River and Delaware River watersheds.

== Demographics ==
Historical population
Census	Pop.	Note	%±
2020	4,850		—
U.S. Decennial Census

=== 2020 census ===
As of the 2020 census, Dorneyville had a population of 4,850. The median age was 47.3 years. 20.6% of residents were under the age of 18 and 26.0% of residents were 65 years of age or older. For every 100 females there were 100.0 males, and for every 100 females age 18 and over there were 97.1 males age 18 and over.

100.0% of residents lived in urban areas, while 0.0% lived in rural areas.

There were 1,855 households in Dorneyville, of which 26.7% had children under the age of 18 living in them. Of all households, 65.6% were married-couple households, 11.3% were households with a male householder and no spouse or partner present, and 18.2% were households with a female householder and no spouse or partner present. About 18.8% of all households were made up of individuals and 10.8% had someone living alone who was 65 years of age or older.

There were 1,936 housing units, of which 4.2% were vacant. The homeowner vacancy rate was 1.0% and the rental vacancy rate was 4.7%.

Racial composition as of the 2020 census
Race	Number	Percent
White	4,030	83.1%
Black or African American	130	2.7%
American Indian and Alaska Native	3	0.1%
Asian	234	4.8%
Native Hawaiian and Other Pacific Islander	1	0.0%
Some other race	139	2.9%
Two or more races	313	6.5%
Hispanic or Latino (of any race)	374	7.7%

=== 2010 census ===
As of the 2010 census, there were 4,406 people and 1,705 total housing units.

=== Demographic estimates ===
The 2013-2017 American Community Survey 5-Year Estimates reported that 96.2% of residents had graduated high school. The median household income was $88,968, and 2.2% of civilians were below the poverty line.
