= Upper Macungie Township, Pennsylvania =

Township in Pennsylvania, US

Upper Macungie Township
- Township
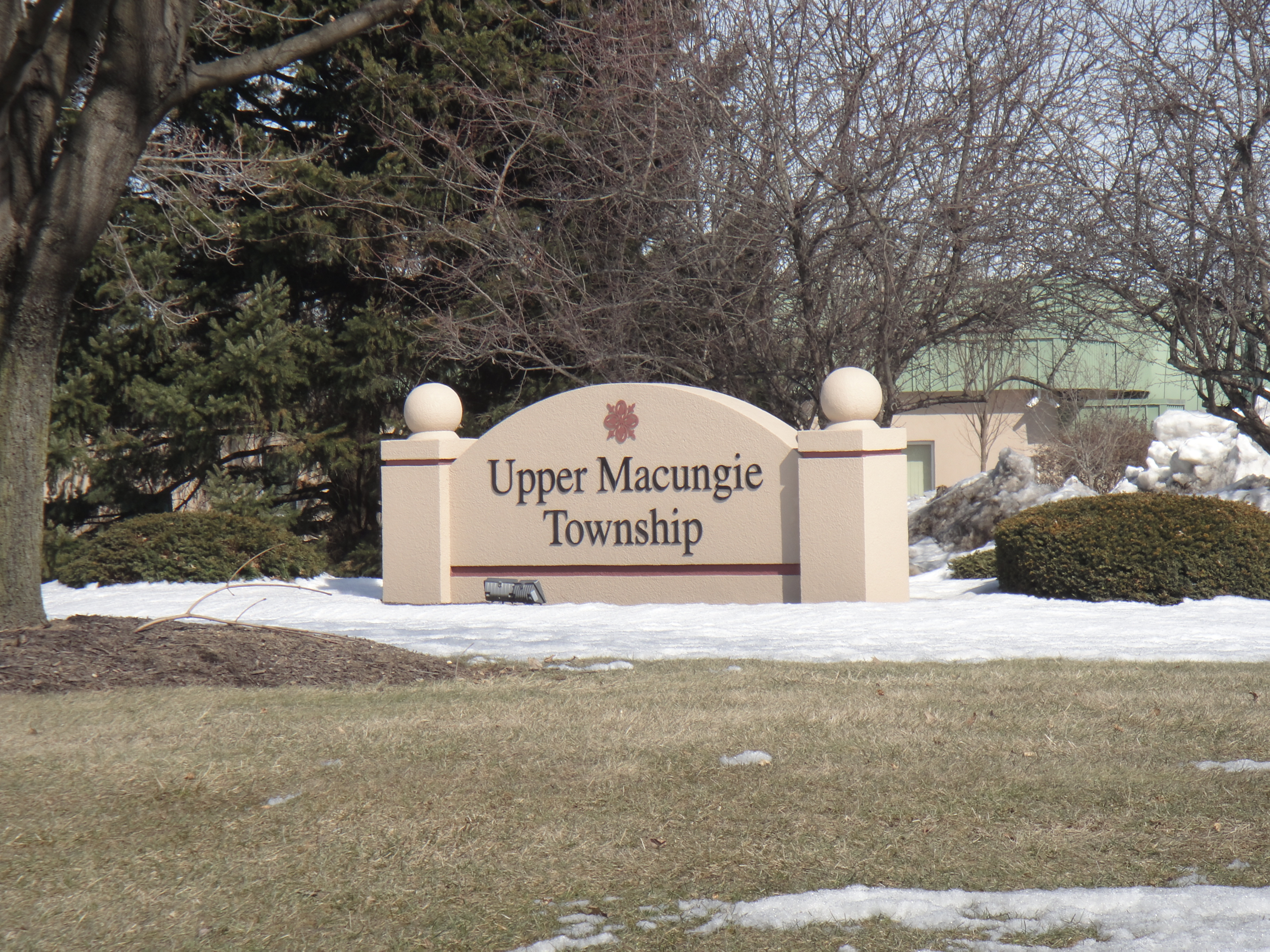
- Township sign in Breinigsville, in March 2014

- Seal

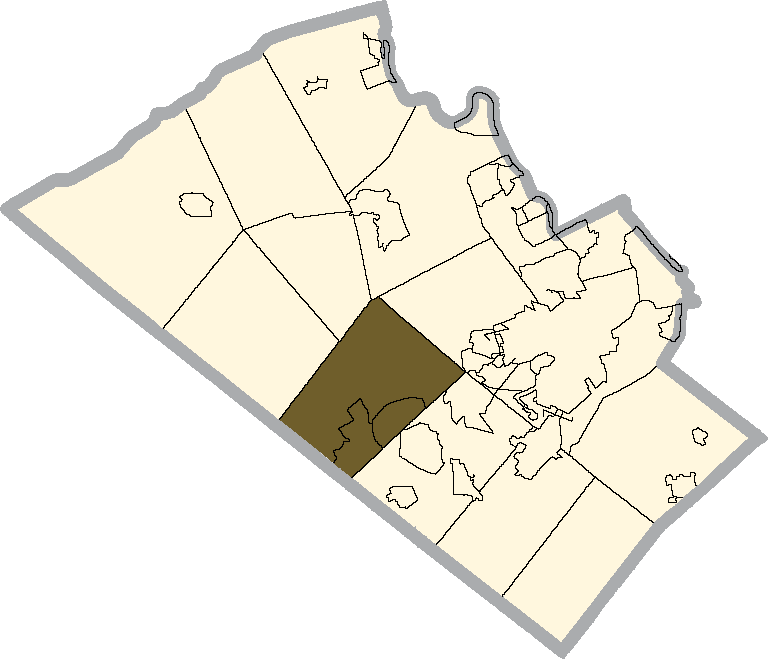
- Location of Upper Macungie Township in Lehigh County, Pennsylvania

- Location of Upper Macungie Township in Pennsylvania Location in the United States
- Coordinates: 40°34′46″N 75°37′00″W
- Country: United States
- State: Pennsylvania
- County: Lehigh

Area
  - Township: 26.26 sq mi (68.02 km^{2})
  - Land: 26.07 sq mi (67.53 km^{2})
  - Water: 0.19 sq mi (0.49 km^{2})
- Elevation: 463 ft (141 m)

Population (2020)
  - Township: 26,377
  - Estimate (July 2022): 27,875
  - Density: 916/sq mi (353.7/km^{2})
  - Metro: 865,310 (US: 68th)
- Time zone: UTC-5 (EST)
  - Summer (DST): UTC-4 (EDT)
- ZIP Codes: 18031, 18051, 18087, 18104, and 18106
- Area codes: 610 and 484
- FIPS code: 42-077-79104
- Primary airport: Lehigh Valley International Airport
- Major hospital: Lehigh Valley Hospital–Cedar Crest
- School district: Parkland
- Website: www.uppermac.org

Upper Macungie Township is a township in Lehigh County, Pennsylvania, United States. The population of Upper Macungie Township was 26,377 as of the 2020 U.S. census, making it the fourth-fastest growing municipality of any category in Pennsylvania in terms of total population growth between 2010 and 2020.

The township was created in 1832 when Macungie Township was divided into Upper and Lower Macungie townships. It is part of the Lehigh Valley metropolitan area, which had a population of 861,899 and was the 68th-most populous metropolitan area in the U.S. as of the 2020 census.

Upper Macungie Township is located 11.5 miles (18.5 km) southwest of Allentown, 60.8 miles (97.8 km) northwest of Philadelphia, and 99.2 miles (159.6 km) west of New York City.

== Geography ==
According to the U.S. Census Bureau, the township has a total area of 26.3 square miles (68.0 km^{2}), of which 26.1 square miles (67.6 km^{2}) are land and 0.2 square miles (0.4 km^{2}), or 0.65%, are water. It is drained by tributaries of Little Lehigh Creek and Jordan Creek into the Lehigh River, which in turn joins the Delaware River in Easton.

=== Villages ===
Upper Macungie Township villages include Breinigsville, Fogelsville, Krocksville, Kuhnsville, Newtown, Ruppsville, and Trexlertown.

=== Climate ===
The township has a hot-summer humid continental climate (Dfa) and the hardiness zone is 6b. The monthly average temperature in Fogelsville ranges from 28.5 °F (−1.9 °C) in January to 73.3 °F (22.9 °C) in July.

=== Adjacent municipalities ===
- Lower Macungie Township (southeast)
- South Whitehall Township (northeast)
- North Whitehall Township (tangent to the north)
- Lowhill Township (north)
- Weisenberg Township (northwest)
- Maxatawny Township, Berks County (west)
- Longswamp Township, Berks County (southwest)

== Demographics ==
Historical population
Census	Pop.	Note	%±
2000	13,895		—
2010	20,063		44.4%
2020	26,377		31.5%

As of the 2020 census, the population of the township was 26,377. The population density was 1,011 inhabitants per square mile (390/km^{2}). The racial makeup of the township was 71.3% White, 8.9% African American, 0.1% Native American, 12.7% Asian, and 5.9% from two or more races. Hispanic or Latino of any race were 9.5% of the population.

There were 9,313 households, out of which 35.8% had children under the age of 18 living with them, 66.0% were married couples living together, 6.5% had a female householder with no husband present, and 25.2% were non-families. 20.2% of all households were made up of individuals, and 8.8% had someone living alone who was 65 years of age or older. The average household size was 2.65 and the average family size was 3.08.

In the township, the population was spread out, with 26.0% under the age of 18, 3.71% from 19 to 24, 36.08% from 25 to 49 and 31.1% age 50 or older. The median age was 39 years. For every 100 females, there were 92.9 males. For every 100 females age 18 and over, there were 92.9 males. The median income for a household in the township was $85,600, and the median income for a family was $97,180. Upper Macungie has one of the highest median family incomes in the state of Pennsylvania with an amount nearly double the state average. Males had a median income of $57,971 versus $38,490 for females. The per capita income for the township was $35,506. About 0.8% of families and 2.6% of the population were below the poverty line, including 1.8% of those under age 18 and 9.0% of those age 65 or over.

== Government and politics ==
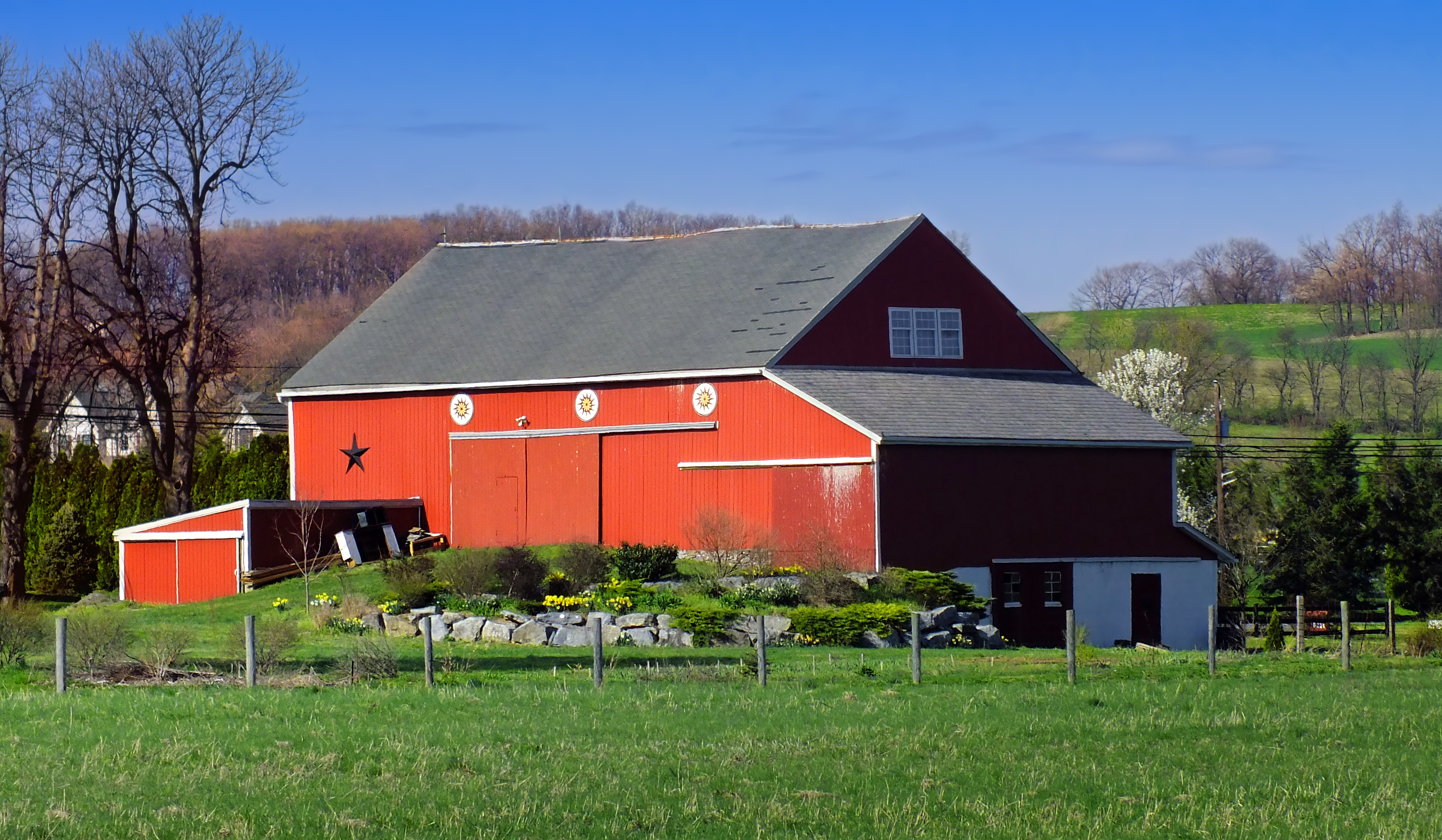
A Pennsylvania Dutch-style barn in the Breiningsville section of Upper Macungie Township, in March 2012

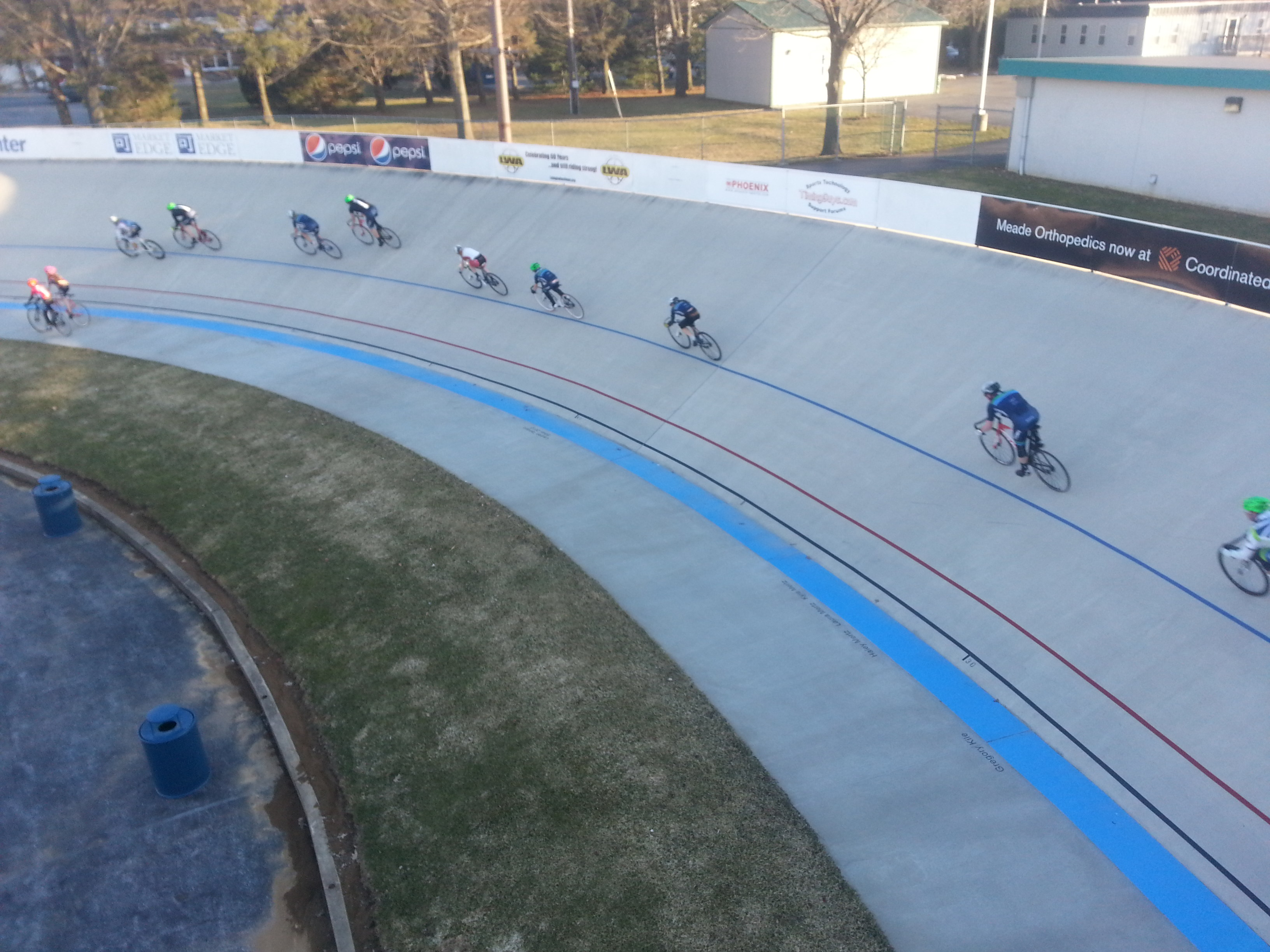
Valley Preferred Cycling Center in Breinigsville, in April 2014

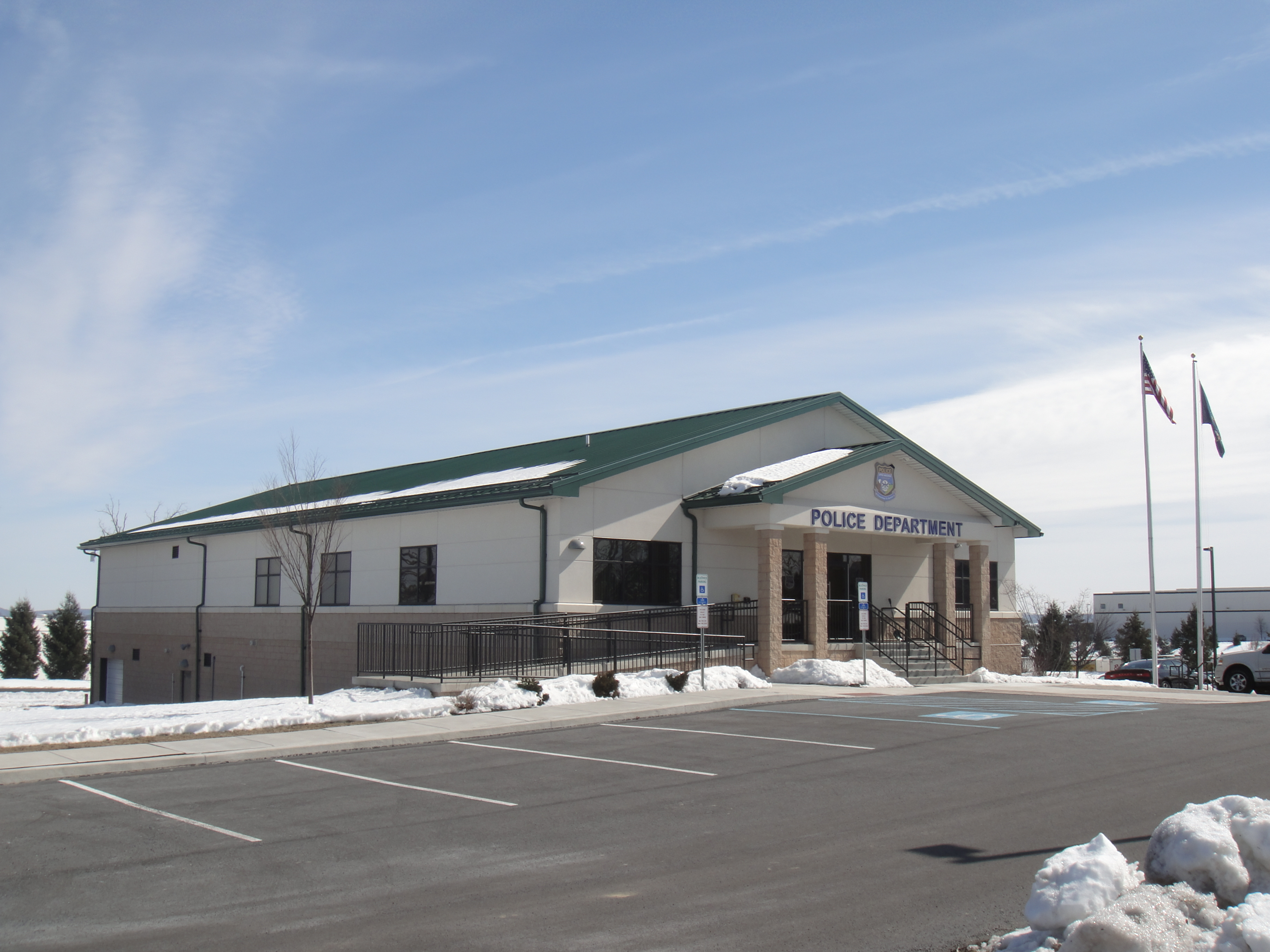
Upper Macungie Township Police Department in Breinigsville, in March 2014

=== Federal government ===
- U.S. Representative Ryan Mackenzie, Republican, 7th district
- Municipal government

Upper Macungie Township is governed by a Board of Supervisors consisting of three members. As of September 4, 2026, the board includes:

- Jeff Fleishaker, Chairman
- Sunny Ghai, Vice-Chair
- Andrew Snyder, Member

The township is managed by an appointed Township Manager and administered by the Township Secretary.

=== Police and fire ===
Upper Macungie Township is served by the Upper Macungie Township Police Department. Prior to 2012, it was served by the now defunct Berks-Lehigh Regional Police.

Fire and emergency services are provided by:

- Fogelsville Volunteer Fire Company, Lehigh County Station 8
- Good Will Fire Co. No. 1 of Trexlertown, Lehigh County Station 25
- Upper Macungie Township Emergency Services Bldg., Lehigh County Station 56
- Upper Macungie Bureau of Fire, Fire Inspectors, Station 55
- Upper Macungie Fire and Rescue, Staffing Program, Station 57

United States presidential election results for Upper Macungie Township, Pennsylvania
Year	Republican		Democratic		Third party(ies)	
Year	No.	%	No.	%	No.	%
2024	7,525	47.58%	7,937	50.19%	352	2.23%
2020	6,768	46.16%	7,715	52.62%	179	1.22%
2016	5,836	49.93%	5,435	46.50%	417	3.57%
2012	5,309	54.15%	4,398	44.85%	98	1.00%
2008	4,522	49.80%	4,471	49.23%	88	0.97%
2004	4,632	58.26%	3,286	41.33%	33	0.42%

== Education ==
The township is served by Parkland School District. Students in grades 9-12 attend Parkland High School in the district.

Most of its middle school students attend Springhouse Middle School except those in the far north of the township. The district maintains six elementary schools for students in kindergarten through fifth grades, including Fogelsville, Fred J. Jaindl, and Veterans Memorial Elementary Schools in Upper Macungie, and Cetronia, Kernsville, and Parkway Manor Elementary Schools located elsewhere in the district.

== Transportation ==
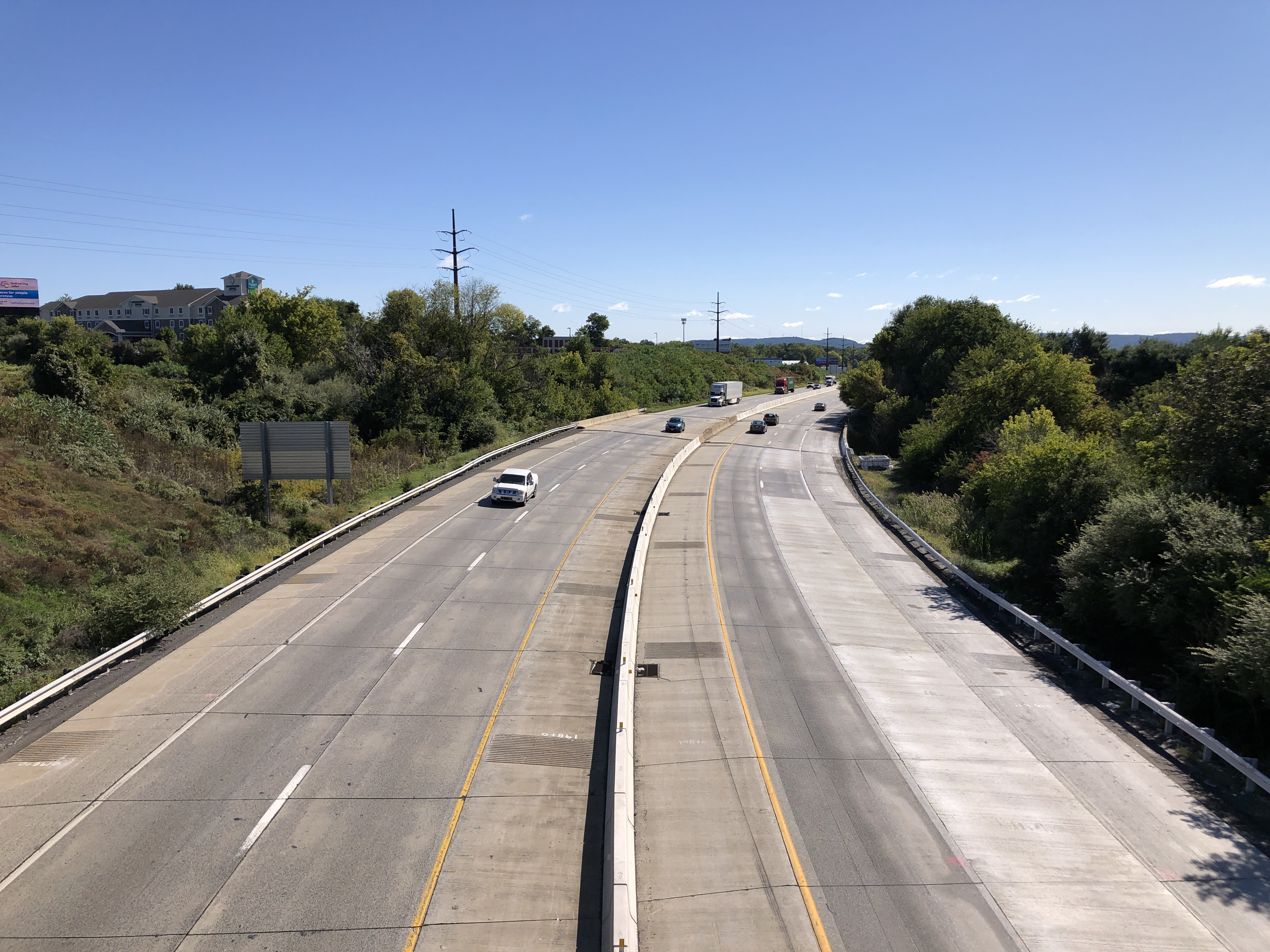
I-78 East in Upper Macungie Township, in September 2022

As of 2022, there were 182.81 miles (294.20 km) of public roads in Upper Macungie Township, of which 0.90 miles (1.45 km) were maintained by the Pennsylvania Turnpike Commission (PTC), 45.97 miles (73.98 km) were maintained by the Pennsylvania Department of Transportation (PennDOT) and 135.94 miles (218.77 km) were maintained by the township.

Interstate 78 and U.S. Route 22 run through Fogelsville at exit 49, where they meet Pennsylvania Route 100; they are the primary east-to-west roads. U.S. Route 222 runs from the southwest to the northeast, while Pennsylvania Route 100, Interstate 476, and Pennsylvania Route 863 are the primary north-to-south roads. Another important east-to-west road is Schantz Road, which serves multiple industrial and commerce parks and nearly traverses the township. LANta bus routes 213, 218, and 322 serve the township.
