= Lehigh Valley Health Network =

Healthcare organization in Allentown, United States

- Company type: Subsidiary
- Industry: Healthcare, hospitals
- Founded: 1899; 127 years ago
- Headquarters: Allentown, Pennsylvania, U.S.
- Services: Primary, secondary, and tertiary care centers; ambulatory clinics
- Revenue: $4.1 B (Fiscal Year 2023)
- Operating income: US$10.4 million (Fiscal Year 2023)
- Number of employees: 20,000 (2024)
- Parent: Jefferson Health
- Website: www.lvhn.org

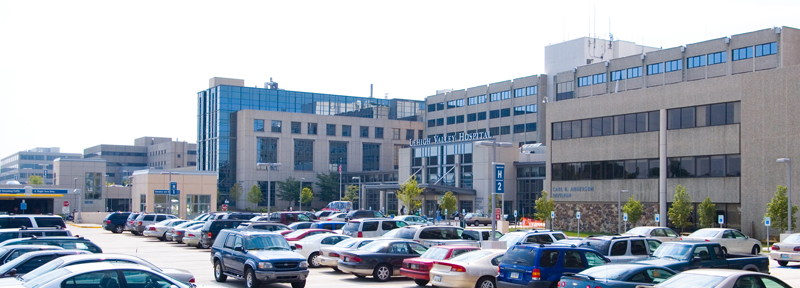
Lehigh Valley Hospital–Cedar Crest on Cedar Crest Boulevard in Allentown, the largest hospital in the Lehigh Valley, third-largest hospital in Pennsylvania with 877 beds and 46 operating rooms, and Lehigh Valley Health Network's flagship hospital

Lehigh Valley Health Network is a subsidiary of Jefferson Health. Prior to its August 2024 merger of equals with Jefferson Health, Lehigh Valley Health Network was an independent healthcare network based in the Allentown, Pennsylvania in the Lehigh Valley metropolitan region of eastern Pennsylvania. The healthcare subsidiary serves the Lehigh Valley and Northeastern Pennsylvania regions of Pennsylvania.

The network's flagship hospital, Lehigh Valley Hospital–Cedar Crest, located on Cedar Crest Boulevard in Allentown, is the third-largest hospital in the state as of 2023.

Prior to the merger, Lehigh Valley Health Network was the largest employer in the Lehigh Valley metropolitan region.

== History ==
Lehigh Valley Health Network has 981 licensed-acute beds on its three campuses. Its flagship hospital, Lehigh Valley Hospital–Cedar Crest, located at 1200 South Cedar Crest Boulevard in Allentown, is the state's third-largest hospital, Pennsylvania's first Level One Trauma Center, and one of two Level One trauma centers in the Lehigh Valley, the state's third-most populous metropolitan region with 861,889 residents as of 2020. St. Luke’s University Health Network’s Bethlehem Hospital, located in Fountain Hill, is the only other Level One trauma center in the Lehigh Valley. The hospital's trauma center also provides pediatric trauma care.

In 2007, Lehigh Valley Health Network had 50,070 admissions, 14,319 inpatient surgeries, 453,477 outpatient visits, 14,841 outpatient surgeries, 119,017 emergency room visits, and 3,184 births in network hospitals. LVHN operates the third largest heart surgery program in Pennsylvania with more than 1,200 open-heart procedures performed each year. The Lehigh Valley Health Network Cancer Center, based on its Cedar Crest Boulevard campus, is the fourth-largest in Pennsylvania, treating over 2,400 new patients annually.

In 2014, operating income for the network increased by $9 million to $42 million. Acute admissions increased more than two percent over 2013, to 55,000, and emergency room visits, increased seven percent over 2013, to 190,000.

In 2014, the not-for-profit hospital network increased its philanthropic giving to $354 million, up eight percent over 2013, providing free care, reduced cost care, education, sponsorships, and other efforts that make up the foundation of the network's not-for-profit status. The not-for-profit supports over 11,000 free flu shots, which are offered at Dorney Park & Wildwater Kingdom in South Whitehall Township and Coca-Cola Park in East Allentown, and a dental van that provides free care to more than 1,000 children annually and covers the differential between health care costs and how much Medicaid and Medicare reimburse.

=== Merger with Pocono Health System ===
In May 2015, the parent companies of Pocono Health System and Lehigh Valley Health Network announced an agreement to merge. The planned merger was approved by both corporations' boards of directors in separate meetings.

On January 1, 2017, a full asset merger of Pocono Health System and flagship hospital, Pocono Medical Center, by Lehigh Valley Health Network was completed. Pocono Health System was renamed LVHN-Pocono, and Pocono Medical Center was renamed Lehigh Valley Hospital-Pocono.

=== Merger with Jefferson ===
Lehigh Valley Health Network announced plans to merge with Jefferson Health in December 2023. While officially a merger of Lehigh Valley-based LVHN and Philadelphia-based Jefferson Health the new system will be headquartered in Philadelphia and run by current Jefferson Health CEO and executives. The merger of Lehigh Valley Health Network was spurred by Jefferson's need to expand Jefferson Health's insurance offerings across more of Pennsylvania and the continued poor financial and market performance of LVHN. The merger with LVHN by Jefferson Health was completed on August 1, 2024. The larger Jefferson Health system, as of August 1, 2024, has 32 hospitals and over 700 locations. The larger entity will have revenues over $13 Billion and over 2,000 hospital beds easily surpassing Penn Medicine to become the second largest health network in Pennsylvania behind Pittsburgh based UPMC.

== Locations ==
Tracing its roots back to Allentown Hospital, which was founded in 1899, LVHN has grown to include nine regional hospital campuses, physicians practices and groups, clinics, testing, and imaging centers, health centers, and urgent care locations. The hospital campuses are:

=== Carbon County ===
Lehigh Valley Hospital–Carbon, 2128 Blakeslee Blvd Dr E., Lehighton

=== Lackawanna County ===
- Lehigh Valley Hospital–Dickson City, 330 Main St., Dickson City

=== Lehigh County ===
- Lehigh Valley Hospital–Cedar Crest, 1200 S. Cedar Crest Boulevard, Allentown
  - Combined Adult Level I / Pediatric Level II trauma center
- Lehigh Valley Hospital–17th Street, 1627 W. Chew Street, Allentown
- Lehigh Valley Hospital–Muhlenberg, 2545 Schoenersville Rd., Bethlehem
- Lehigh Valley Hospital-Macungie, 3369 Route 100, Macungie
  - "Micro-Hospital" with for-profit status

=== Luzerne County ===
- Lehigh Valley Hospital–Hazleton, 700 E. Broad St., Hazleton
  - Level IV trauma center

=== Monroe County ===
- Lehigh Valley Hospital–Pocono, 206 E. Brown St., East Stroudsburg
  - Level III trauma center
- Lehigh Valley Hospital-Pocono Creek, 1328 Golden Slipper Rd., Bartonsville
  - "Micro-Hospital"

=== Montgomery County ===
- Lehigh Valley Hospital-Gilbertsville, 1109 Grosser Rd., Gilbertsville
  - "Micro-Hospital" with for-profit status

=== Northampton County ===
- Lehigh Valley Hospital–Hecktown Oaks, 3780 Hecktown Rd., Easton

=== Schuylkill County ===
- Lehigh Valley Hospital–Schuylkill E. Norwegian St., 700 E.Norwegian St., Pottsville
- Lehigh Valley Hospital—Schuylkill S. Jackson St., 420 S. Jackson St., Pottsville
