= Seidersville, Pennsylvania =

Village in Pennsylvania, U.S.

Coordinates: 40°35′16″N 75°23′05″W

Seidersville is a suburban Lehigh Valley village on Route 378 in Lower Saucon Township in Northampton County, Pennsylvania. It is part of the Lehigh Valley metropolitan area, which had a population of 861,899 and was the 68th-most populous metropolitan area in the U.S. as of the 2020 census.

Seidersville is located on Lehigh Mountain, just south of Bethlehem. Its ZIP Code is 18015.
