= Parkland School District =

School district in Pennsylvania

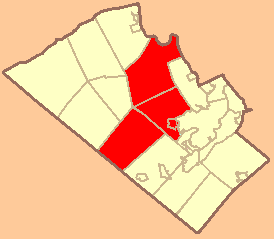
- Location of Parkland School District in Lehigh County, Pennsylvania

Address
- 1210 Springhouse Road Allentown, Pennsylvania, 18104; United States

District information
- Type: Public
- Superintendent: Dr. Mark J. Madson
- Schools: 11, including Parkland High School
- Budget: $205.036 million
- NCES District ID: 4218510

Students and staff
- Students: 9,996 (2024-25)
- Teachers: 679.03 (on an FTE basis)
- Student–teacher ratio: 14.72
- Athletic conference: Eastern Pennsylvania Conference
- District mascot: Trojans
- Colors: Red and Gray

Other information
- Website: www.parklandsd.org

Parkland School District is a large public school district located in the Lehigh Valley region of eastern Pennsylvania. It serves North Whitehall Township, South Whitehall Township, Upper Macungie Township, and part of western Allentown. The district also includes the following census-designated places in South Whitehall Township: Cetronia, and the township's portion of Dorneyville. The district also includes the South Whitehall communities of Orefield, Scherersville, Walbert, and others.

Parkland School District has one high school, Parkland High School, two middle schools, and nine elementary schools. As of the 2024–25 school year, the school district had a total enrollment of 9,996 students between its 12 schools, according to National Center for Education Statistics data.

== Parkland High School ==
With 3,279 students as of the 2024–2025 school year, Parkland High School is the largest high school in the Lehigh Valley and one of the largest in the state.

== Middle schools ==
The school district maintains two middle schools for grades six through eight:

=== Orefield Middle School ===
Orefield Middle School

Location
- 2675 PA Route 309; Orefield, Pennsylvania 18069; United States

Information
- Type: Public
- Established: 1999
- School district: Parkland School District
- Superintendent: Dr. Mark J. Madson
- Principal: Dr. Monica Ouly-Uhl
- Grades: 6th to 8th grades
- Enrollment: 959 (2021-22)
- Student to teacher ratio: 13.96
- Mascot: Jaguar
- Newspaper: The Orefield Oracle
- Information: 610-351-5750
- Website: Orefield Middle School

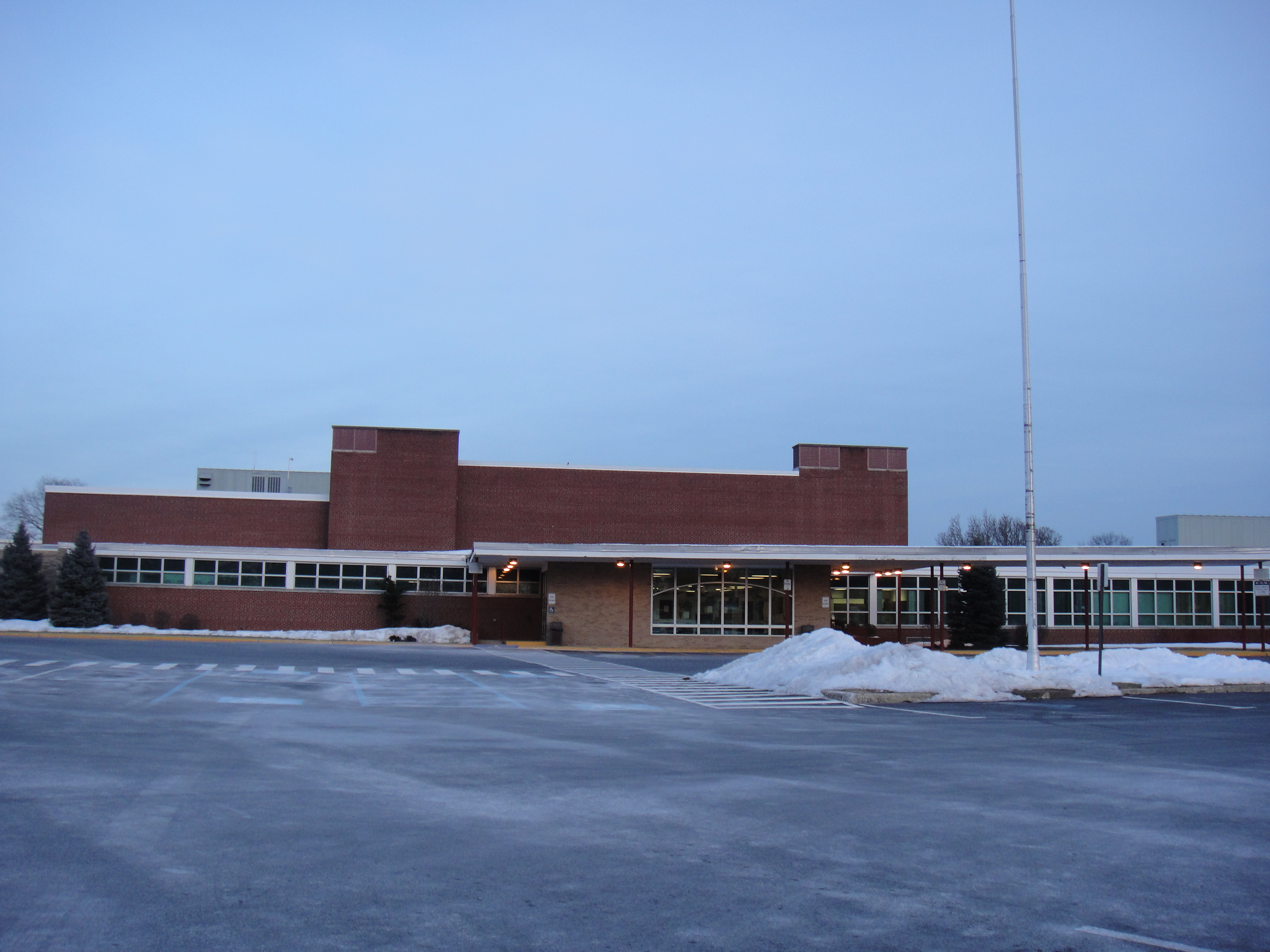
Orefield Middle School in Orefield, one of two middle schools in Parkland School District serving students in grades six through eight

Orefield Middle School is located in Orefield, Pennsylvania on PA Route 309. It is the home of Parkland's football stadium and bus depot. The school serves the northern half of the district, primarily north of Tilghman Street.

Orefield Middle School was founded in 1999. Its predecessor, Troxell Junior High School, was established when students in grades 7 to 9 were moved from Parkland High School due to overcrowding. When the new and current Parkland High School was constructed in 1999, the school was moved from Troxell to the old high school building and renamed Orefield Middle School to serve students in grades 6 to 8. During the first two terms in the new building, the facility was renovated to accommodate middle school instruction. In 2014, a rain garden was installed in a courtyard to aid in environmental education.

Students at Orefield are assigned to teams of teachers that are instructors for core subjects. As of 2023, There are six teams for 6th grade, and three teams each for 7th and 8th grades. The school also has language, music, art, and technology classes. Orefield Middle School's 2014 performance profile indicated that the school has an academic score of 89.3.

=== Springhouse Middle School ===
Springhouse Middle School

Location
- 1200 Springhouse Road; Allentown, Pennsylvania 18104; United States

Information
- Type: Public
- Established: 1970
- School district: Parkland School District
- Superintendent: Dr. Mark J. Madson
- Principal: Mr. Connor Barz
- Grades: 6th to 8th grades
- Enrollment: 1,276 (2021-22)
- Student to teacher ratio: 15.05
- Mascot: Timberwolf
- Information: (610) 351-5700
- Website: Springhouse Middle School

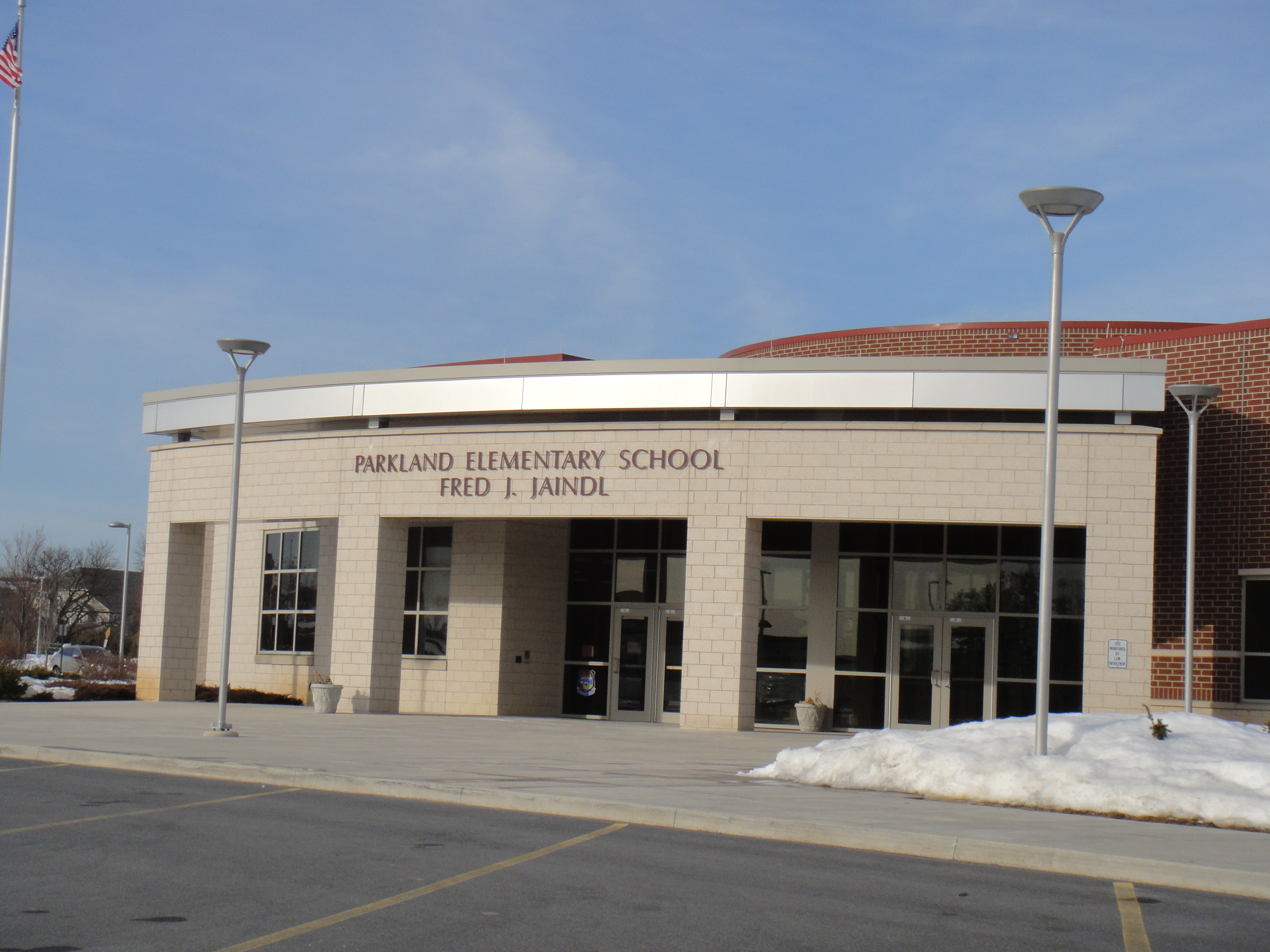
Fred J. Jaindl Elementary School in Breinigsville, one of Parkland School District's nine elementary schools, March 2014

Springhouse Middle School is located in Allentown, on Springhouse Road just behind the Administration building. It serves the southern half of the district, primarily south of Tilghman Street.

Springhouse Middle School was initially a Junior High School serving grades 7–9. However, when the new High School was constructed and Troxell Junior High School closed, Springhouse began serving grades 6–8.

In 2006, the school underwent a renovation and expansion due to overcrowding (spurring from numerous new developments in Upper Macungie). The D-wing, auxiliary gymnasium, health class rooms, and a new dedicated band room were part of the expansion. Despite this, the school is again dealing with overcrowding and in 2016 had to recently cede some of its sending area to Orefield.

Students at Springhouse are assigned to teams of teachers that are instructors for core subjects. As of the 2025-2026 school year, there are five teams for the 6th grade, and four teams each for the 7th and 8th grades. The school also has language, music, art, and technology classes. Springhouse Middle School's 2016 performance profile indicated that the school has an academic score of 81.14.

In 2014, the school became famous for becoming the first-ever Science Olympiad team to make the national competition, where they won the DuPont Enterprise Excellence Award. Springhouse has made the national competition in 2015 and 2016 as well, winning numerous gold medals in various categories.

== Elementary schools ==
The school district maintains nine elementary schools, including:

=== Cetronia Elementary School ===
Cetronia Elementary School is currently rated the fourth-best school in the entire school district. With three floors and three hallways, the school holds more than 500 students during the school year. Cetronia is the home of the "hedgehogs". The students are exposed to various extra activities, such as the media center, gym, music, and art. At grade 4, students can choose an instrument to play throughout school until their graduation of high school. With cleanly kept playgrounds, a track, and a basketball court, the students are exposed to fresh air for 20 minutes of their day. They are also rewarded for good behavior with a STARS ticket in rare occasions. Those also lead to more rewards of playing video games with the principal and gift cards for various places.

=== Fogelsville Elementary School ===
Symbolized by a rosette encircled in a scalloped design on the front of the building, Fogelsville Elementary School was built in 1965. These seven separate rosettes, which are located both inside and outside the school, are mosaics set into the brickwork. According to Pennsylvania Dutch legend, the rosette repels “bad luck” and the scalloped design helps the students inside “sail smoothly” through life. Intended by its architects to reflect the historical roots of the school's community, the school was first called The Upper Macungie Elementary School and in 1970 renamed to Fogelsville Elementary School. When dedicated in 1965, the original building consisted of 13 classrooms, a library, a health room, and an activity building, which accommodated 411 students. Fogelsville Elementary consists of 28 classrooms with an enrollment of 694 students, which presently is the largest of the eight elementary schools.

=== Fred Jaindl Elementary School ===
Named after Frederick J. Jaindl, a farmer and philanthropist, the school broke ground on March 29, 2009 and opened its doors in August 2010. The 20-acre site near Trexlertown accommodates approximately 600 students in grades K-5.

=== Ironton Elementary School ===
Ironton Elementary School was built in 1942.

=== Kernsville Elementary School ===
Built in the 1850s as a one-room schoolhouse, Kernsville is located on Orefield Road in Orefield, Pennsylvania. It is a mere mile away from Orefield Middle School, serving 481 students in the 2024-2025 school year.

=== Kratzer Elementary School ===
Named after Johannes Kratzer, a German immigrant and farmer who, near the turn of the 19th century and for the consideration of one dollar, donated a corner of his extensive family farm for the construction of a public schoolhouse. Later, when the Parkland School District was formed and unified, the original Kratzer schoolhouse served as the Parkland Community Center. The original building was torn down in the 1960s, but the modern building still retains the name of the original landowner, whose descendants still reside in Lehigh County. A portrait of Kratzer which hung inside the original building has been lost.

There are approximately 400 students that attend Kratzer Elementary School.

=== Schnecksville Elementary School ===
Originally built in 1963, Schnecksville Elementary underwent major renovations in 2022. During these renovations, the older "upper floor" which contained administration, guidance offices, nurse's office, and the library was demolished and these functions were moved to the new wing along with some new rooms including a dedicated STEM activities room. This new wing, in the direction of route 309, will also contain the new main entrance, although students arriving via bus will continue to use the Sand Spring Rd. entrance near the cafeteria.

Schnecksville Elementary is most notable for having once been the home of the "Blake" Shuttle: a Mack Trucks school bus converted into a small-scale mock up Space Shuttle and equipped with a wide variety of Space and Shuttle-related STEM activities. This included flight simulators where students could practice "flying" the Shuttle, programmable robotic arms, and a mock lunar landscape along with the "Mission Control" classroom. Elementary school students from all over Parkland school district regularly took field trips to visit the Blake and participate in the interactive learning experience. The program was retired in 2013, when the mastermind and creator behind this program, Robert Boehmer, retired. Since then, the Blake has been moved to Lehigh Valley airport on permanent display.

=== Veterans Memorial Elementary School ===
Veterans Memorial Elementary School is a public elementary school located in Breinigsville, Pennsylvania. It has 517 students in grades K-5 with a student-teacher ratio of 15 to 1. According to state test scores, 68% of students are at least proficient in math and 76% in reading.
