= Cedar Crest Boulevard =

Route information
- Maintained by PennDOT
- Length: 9.471 mi (15.242 km)
- Existed: 1920s–present
- Component highways: PA 29 from Emmaus to Dorneyville; SR 1019 from Dorneyville to North Whitehall Township

Major junctions
- South end: PA 29 in Emmaus
- I-78 / PA 309 near Dorneyville; PA 222 near Dorneyville; Tilghman Street in Allentown; US 22 in South Whitehall Township; Walbert Avenue in South Whitehall Township
- North end: Mauch Chunk Road in North Whitehall Township

Location
- Country: United States
- State: Pennsylvania
- Counties: Lehigh

Highway system
- Pennsylvania State Route System; Interstate; US; State; Scenic; Legislative
← PA 228	PA 229	→ PA 230

Cedar Crest Boulevard, colloquially known as Cedar Crest and The Boulevard, is a major north-south highway in Lehigh County, Pennsylvania in the Lehigh Valley region of eastern Pennsylvania. South of Interstate 78 (I-78), the road is part of Pennsylvania Route 29 (PA 29). North of it, the road becomes State Route 1019 (SR 1019).

The boulevard is 9.5 miles in length and passes through Allentown, the third-most populous city in Pennsylvania and county seat of Lehigh County. Its southern terminus is in Emmaus at Chestnut Street and its northern terminus is in North Whitehall Township at Mauch Chunk Road. It also is a junction onto I-78, a major east-west highway between Lebanon County in the west and the Holland Tunnel and Lower Manhattan in the east.

Cedar Crest Boulevard is home to many Lehigh Valley attractions, including two large rival high schools, Emmaus High School and Parkland High School, and the main campuses of Lehigh Valley Hospital–Cedar Crest and Cedar Crest College, Dorney Park & Wildwater Kingdom, Lake Muhlenberg, Lehigh Country Club, Lehigh Parkway, Muhlenberg College, and Trexler Park all border the boulevard. The boulevard is a prominent road for Allentown-area commerce, including numerous strip malls, restaurants, and commercial establishments.

== Route description ==
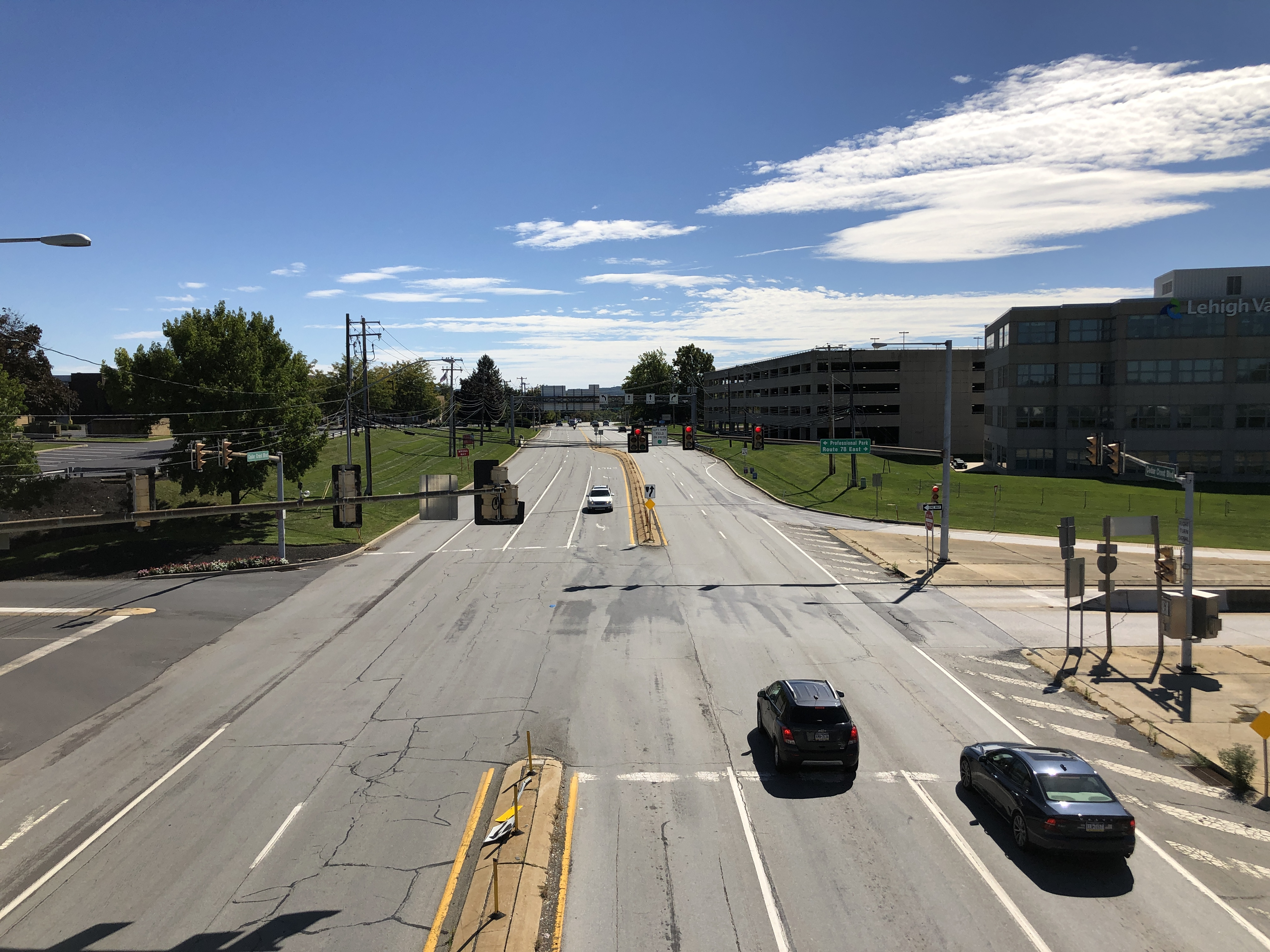
Cedar Crest Boulevard southbound at the I-78/PA 309 interchange in Salisbury Township

Cedar Crest Boulevard begins at an intersection with PA 29 (Chestnut Street) in Emmaus in Lehigh County, heading northwest as a two-lane undivided road that passes through residential areas to the southwest of Emmaus High School and then through a section of Upper Milford Township. It then crosses the border between Emmaus to the east and Lower Macungie Township to the west and curves north as it enters Lower Macungie Township, where it crosses Little Lehigh Creek and then a mix of fields, woods, and homes and passes to the west of Lehigh Country Club.

PA 29 then crosses into Salisbury Township and widens into a four-lane road that passes between Lehigh Valley Hospital–Cedar Crest to the west and an office park to the east. Cedar Crest Boulevard becomes a divided highway and comes to an interchange with I-78/PA 309, where PA 29 ends and the road becomes SR 1019.

Past the interchange, SR 1019 becomes a two-lane undivided road, passing through several suburban residential neighborhoods before entering South Whitehall Township. Cedar Crest Boulevard comes to an intersection with a one-way pair carrying PA 222 in a business area in Dorneyville just east of Dorney Park & Wildwater Kingdom. Following this, the road serves as the border between South Whitehall Township to the west and the Allentown border to the east and west of Cedar Crest College. Cedar Crest Boulevard continues near homes and businesses in the western part of Allentown as a three-lane road with a center left-turn lane, crossing Lehigh Parkway, and then forming the eastern border of Trexler Park.

SR 1019 then crosses SR 1002 (Tilghman Street) in a commercial section of Allentown and then continues through residential areas as a two-lane road and entering South Whitehall Township. The road comes to an interchange with the US 22 freeway and then enters business areas. After crossing SR 1006 (Walbert Avenue) in Wennersville, Cedar Crest Boulevard passes through a mix of farmland and woodland with some development. The road crosses Jordan Creek and then under Norfolk Southern's C&F Secondary before passing Parkland High School to its east. SR 1019 then continues through rural areas and enters North Whitehall Township, where it comes to its northern terminus at an intersection with SR 1017, which is also known as Mauch Chunk Road.

== History ==
Pennsylvania Route 229
- Location: Emmaus – Wennersville
- Existed: 1928–1940s

In 1928, the section of Cedar Crest Boulevard from Walbert Avenue (US 309/PA 29) in Wennersville to Chestnut Street (PA 29) in Emmaus was designated as Pennsylvania Route 229. PA 229 was paved by 1930. By 1950, however, the PA 29 route number was removed, and it was renamed Cedar Crest Boulevard. PA 29 was designated onto a portion of Cedar Crest Boulevard south of US 309 (now I-78/PA 309) in the 1950s.

== Battle of Cedar Crest Boulevard ==
Two of eastern Pennsylvania's largest public high schools, Emmaus High School in Emmaus and Parkland High School in Allentown, are each located off Cedar Crest Boulevard roughly 9 miles (14 km) apart. In high school football, the two rival schools play each other in a game known as the Battle of Cedar Crest Boulevard. The winner of the game each year is awarded the Battle of Cedar Crest Boulevard trophy.

== Major intersections ==
The entire route is in Lehigh County.

Location	mi	km	Destinations	Notes
Emmaus	40.398	65.014	PA 29 south (Chestnut Street) – Boyertown	Southern terminus; south end of PA 29 overlap
Salisbury Township	43.454 0.000	69.932 0.000	I-78 / PA 309 – Harrisburg, Tamaqua, Bethlehem, Quakertown PA 29 ends	Exit 55 (I-78/PA 309); northern terminus of southern section of PA 29; south end of SR 1019
Allentown	0.853– 1.090	1.373– 1.754	PA 222 (Hamilton Boulevard) – Reading, Allentown	
Allentown	2.115	3.404	SR 1002 (Tilghman Street) – Kuhnsville, Allentown	
South Whitehall Township	2.958	4.760	US 22 (Lehigh Valley Thruway) – Harrisburg, Bethlehem	Interchange
South Whitehall Township	3.393	5.461	SR 1006 (Walbert Avenue) – Slatington, Allentown	
North Whitehall Township	6.415	10.324	SR 1017 (Mauch Chunk Road) – Balliettsville, Allentown	Northern terminus
1.000 mi = 1.609 km; 1.000 km = 0.621 mi: Concurrency terminus; Route transition
