= Walbert, Pennsylvania =

Village in Pennsylvania, U.S.

Coordinates: 40°36′40″N 75°34′06″W

Walbert was an unincorporated community that now lies within South Whitehall Township in Lehigh County, Pennsylvania. It was the location of a hotel.

Walbert lies within the Lehigh Valley. It is located on Route 309 and has access to U.S. Route 22, Interstate 78, and Interstate 476. It is drained by the Jordan Creek into the Lehigh River.
