= Lehigh Valley Hospital–Cedar Crest =

Lehigh Valley Hospital-Cedar Crest
- Lehigh Valley Health Network
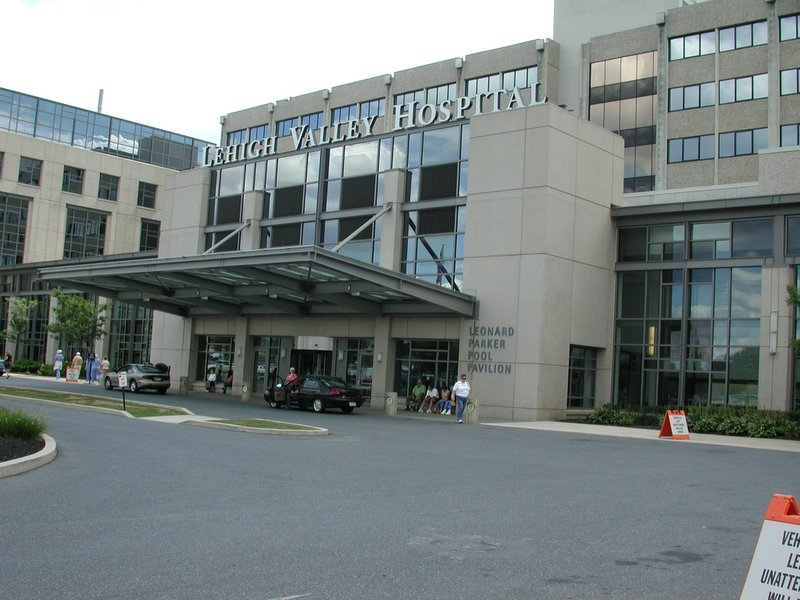
- Lehigh Valley Hospital-Cedar Crest in Allentown, Pennsylvania in August 2005

Geography
- Location: 1200 South Cedar Crest Boulevard, Allentown, Pennsylvania, U.S.
- Coordinates: 40.56633°N 75.52403°W

Organisation
- Type: Teaching
- Affiliated university: University of South Florida College of Medicine (SELECT Program)
- Network: Lehigh Valley Health Network

Services
- Emergency department: Combined Adult Level I / Pediatric Level II
- Beds: 981

Helipads
- Helipad: FAA LID: 98PN
Number	Length		Surface
Number	ft	m	Surface
H1	60	18	Asphalt

Links
- Website: Lehigh Valley Hospital

Lehigh Valley Hospital–Cedar Crest, commonly referred to as Lehigh Valley Hospital, is a hospital located at 1200 South Cedar Crest Boulevard in Allentown, Pennsylvania. It is the largest hospital in the Lehigh Valley region of eastern Pennsylvania, and the third-largest hospital in the state after UPMC Presbyterian in Pittsburgh and Thomas Jefferson University Hospital in Philadelphia.

The hospital has 877 licensed beds and 46 operating rooms. Lehigh Valley Reilly Children's Hospital, a children's hospital, is also located on the hospital's Cedar Crest campus in Allentown. The burn center at the hospital is verified by the ABA to treat both adults & children.

Lehigh Valley Hospital is the flagship hospital of Lehigh Valley Health Network (LVHN), a multi-campus healthcare network in eastern Pennsylvania that also includes seven smaller full-service hospitals in the region:

- Lehigh Valley Hospital-17th Street in Allentown
- Lehigh Valley Hospital-Muhlenberg in Bethlehem
- Lehigh Valley Hospital-Hecktown Oaks in Easton
- Lehigh Valley Hospital-Hazleton in Hazleton
- Lehigh Valley Hospital-Schuylkill East in Pottsville
- Lehigh Valley Hospital-Schuylkill South in Pottsville
- Lehigh Valley Hospital-Pocono in East Stroudsburg

Lehigh Valley Health Network has community health centers, primary care and specialty physician practices, pharmacies, imaging, home health, hospice, laboratory services and other health services in eight Pennsylvania counties: Berks, Bucks, Carbon, Lehigh, Luzerne, Monroe, Northampton, and Schuylkill.

== Hospital rankings ==
In 2023, U.S. News & World Report was ranked the sixth-best hospital in Pennsylvania. It was ranked nationally in orthopedics, where it was designated the 27th-best hospital for orthopedics in the nation.

Lehigh Valley Health Network hospitals are the only Lehigh Valley-based hospitals participating in the Leapfrog Group's evaluation of health care safety, quality, and customer value. In 2007, Lehigh Valley Hospital was one of 39 hospitals in the nation to receive the Leapfrog Group Top Hospital award. All LVHN hospitals meet Leapfrog standards for patient safety. and each are accredited by the Joint Commission.

On February 23, 2011, Becker's Hospital Review included Lehigh Valley Hospital–Cedar Crest among its listing of the "50 Best Hospitals in America" report. It is also a three time certified National Magnet Hospital for nursing excellence from the American Nurses Credentialing Center.

In 2014, the Joint Commission accredited Lehigh Valley-Cedar Crest Hospital as a comprehensive stroke center.

== Notable people ==
=== Births ===
- Lil Peep, musician (1996)

=== Hospitalizations ===
- Joe Burrow, professional football player, Cincinnati Bengals (2023)
- Sal Frelick, professional baseball player, Milwaukee Brewers (2023)
- Ryan Hunter-Reay, professional race car driver (2017)
- Robert Wickens, Canadian professional race car driver (2018)

=== Deaths ===
- Maurice Broun, ornithologist and author (October 2, 1979)
- Darryl Dawkins, former professional basketball player, Detroit Pistons, New Jersey Nets, Philadelphia 76ers, and Utah Jazz (August 27, 2015)
- Mulgrew Miller, jazz musician (May 29, 2013)
- Thomas Welsh, Catholic bishop (February 19, 2009)
- Justin Wilson, British professional race car driver (August 24, 2015)
