= Fort Deshler =

- Whitehall Township, Pennsylvania
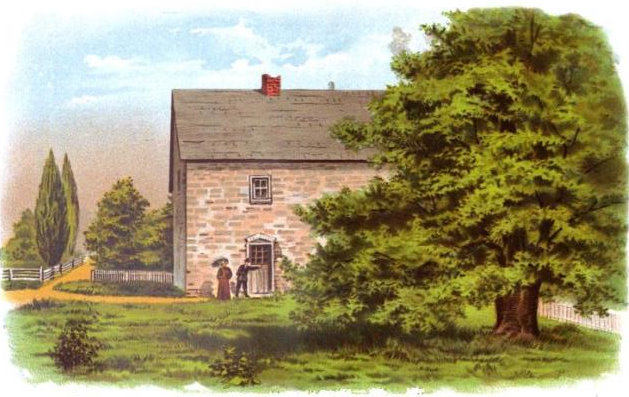
- An 1895 engraving of Fort Deshler in Whitehall Township, Pennsylvania

Site information
- Type: Fort
- Controlled by: Province of Pennsylvania

Location
- Former location of Fort Deshler in Pennsylvania
- Coordinates: 40.672°N 75.520°W

Site history
- Built: 1760
- Built by: Adam Deshler
- Materials: Stone
- Battles/wars: French and Indian War; Pontiac's Rebellion

Pennsylvania Historical Marker
- Designated: October 7, 2001

Fort Deshler, located near Egypt, Lehigh County, Pennsylvania, USA, was a French and Indian War era frontier fort established in 1760 to protect settlers from Indian attacks. The fort was near the location of what is now the intersection of Pennsylvania Route 145 and Chestnut Street, between Egypt and Coplay.

== Description ==
The fort was built by Adam Deshler, who immigrated from Switzerland in 1733 and was employed during the French and Indian War furnishing provisions for provincial forces. It was actually a fortified stone blockhouse, 40 feet (12 m) long and 30 feet (9.1 m) wide, with walls 2.5 feet (0.76 m) thick, that also served as Deshler's home. The main house was two stories in height with an attic living space. Gun ports were concealed throughout the thick stone walls. Adjoining the main building was a second large wooden structure, used as barracks for 20 soldiers and for storing military supplies.

There appears to be no evidence that the fort was either garrisoned with provincial troops or served any military purpose beyond functioning as a place of refuge and rendezvous for settlers of the region. The fort saw no military action during the French and Indian War.

== Whitehall massacre ==
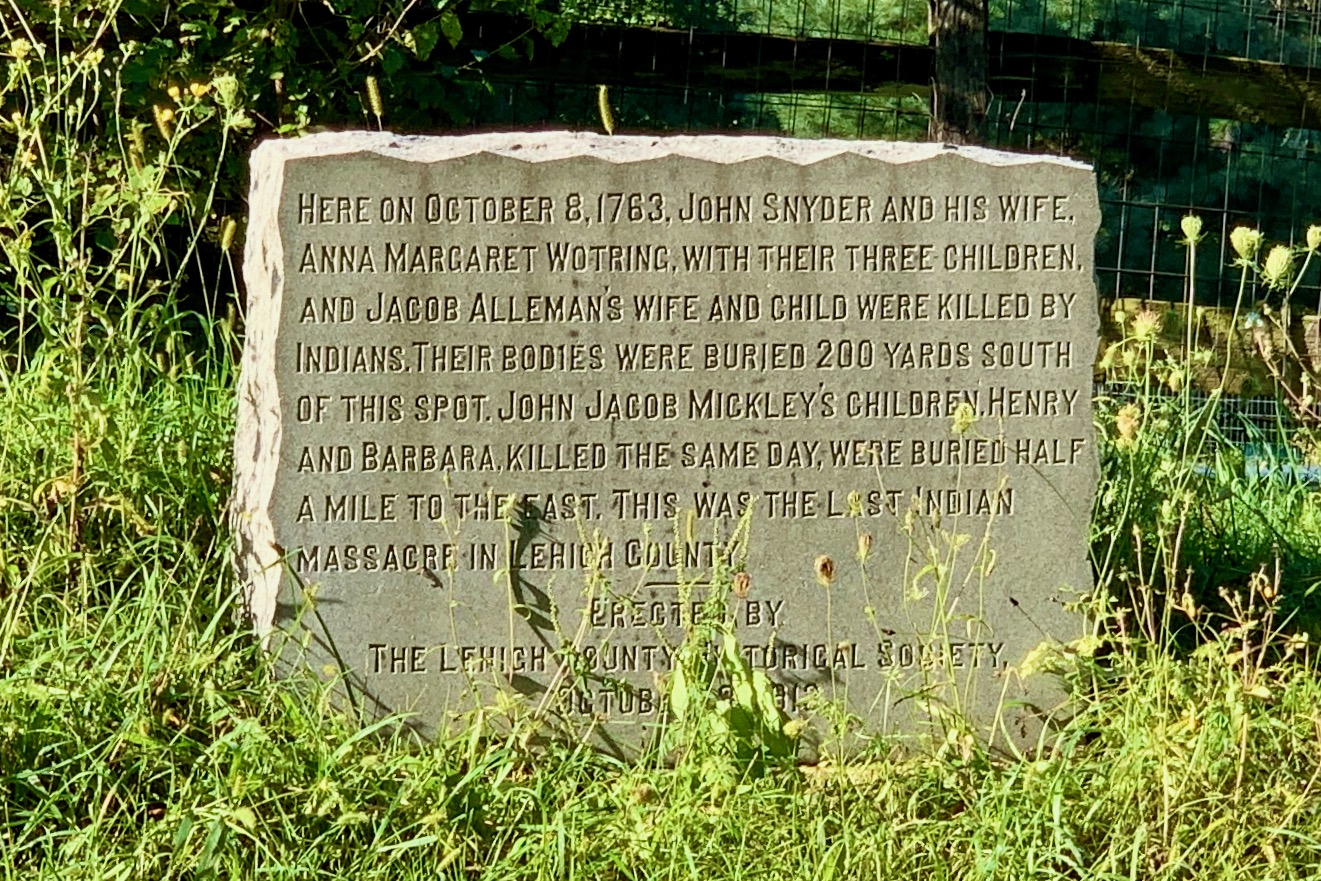
Monument to some of those killed during the Whitehall massacre on October 8, 1763.

On October 8, 1763, during Pontiac's War, a war party of about 20 Native Americans attacked several homes in Whitehall Township, Pennsylvania. They killed a militia captain (Captain Jacob Wetterholt) and about 23 civilians, raiding and setting fire to homes before fleeing. Dozens of local residents took refuge in Fort Deshler during this attack. One report states that at that time, the fort had "twenty men in arms," although these were probably not soldiers. These men pursued the Indians but lost them, then recovered two injured girls, one of whom had been scalped.

== Later years ==
The fort remained in the Deshler family until 1899, when the building and its remaining 151 acres (0.61 km^{2}; 0.24 sq mi) of property were sold to the Coplay Cement Company for $100,000.

The historian Charles Rhoads Roberts, in his 1914 History of Lehigh County Pennsylvania and a Genealogical and Biographical Records of its Families, wrote the following about Fort Deshler:

"This old stone mansion, the only building standing in Lehigh County which was used as a fort in the colonial period, should by all means be preserved and marked as a historic spot, not only as a memorial to the pioneers of this location but also as a reminder to the coming generations of the hardships which their staunch and sturdy ancestors were compelled to undergo."

Fort Deshler was not preserved, and stood in ruins until it collapsed around 1940. Its location is commemorated by a Pennsylvania Historical and Museum Commission marker.

== See also ==
- Lehigh County Historical Society
- List of Forts in the United States
- Whitehall Parkway
- Pennsylvania forts in the French and Indian War

== Sources ==
- Commonwealth of Pennsylvania (1896). Report of the Commission to Locate the Site of the Frontier Forts of Pennsylvania. Harrisburg: Clarence M. Busch, State Printer of Pennsylvania.
- Charles Rhoads Roberts; Rev. John Baer Stoudt; Rev. Thomas H. Krick; William J. Dietrich (1914). History of Lehigh County Pennsylvania and a Genealogical and Biographical Records of its Families. Vol. 1. Lehigh Valley Publishing Company.
