= Shelter House =

Historic house in Pennsylvania, United States

- U.S. National Register of Historic Places
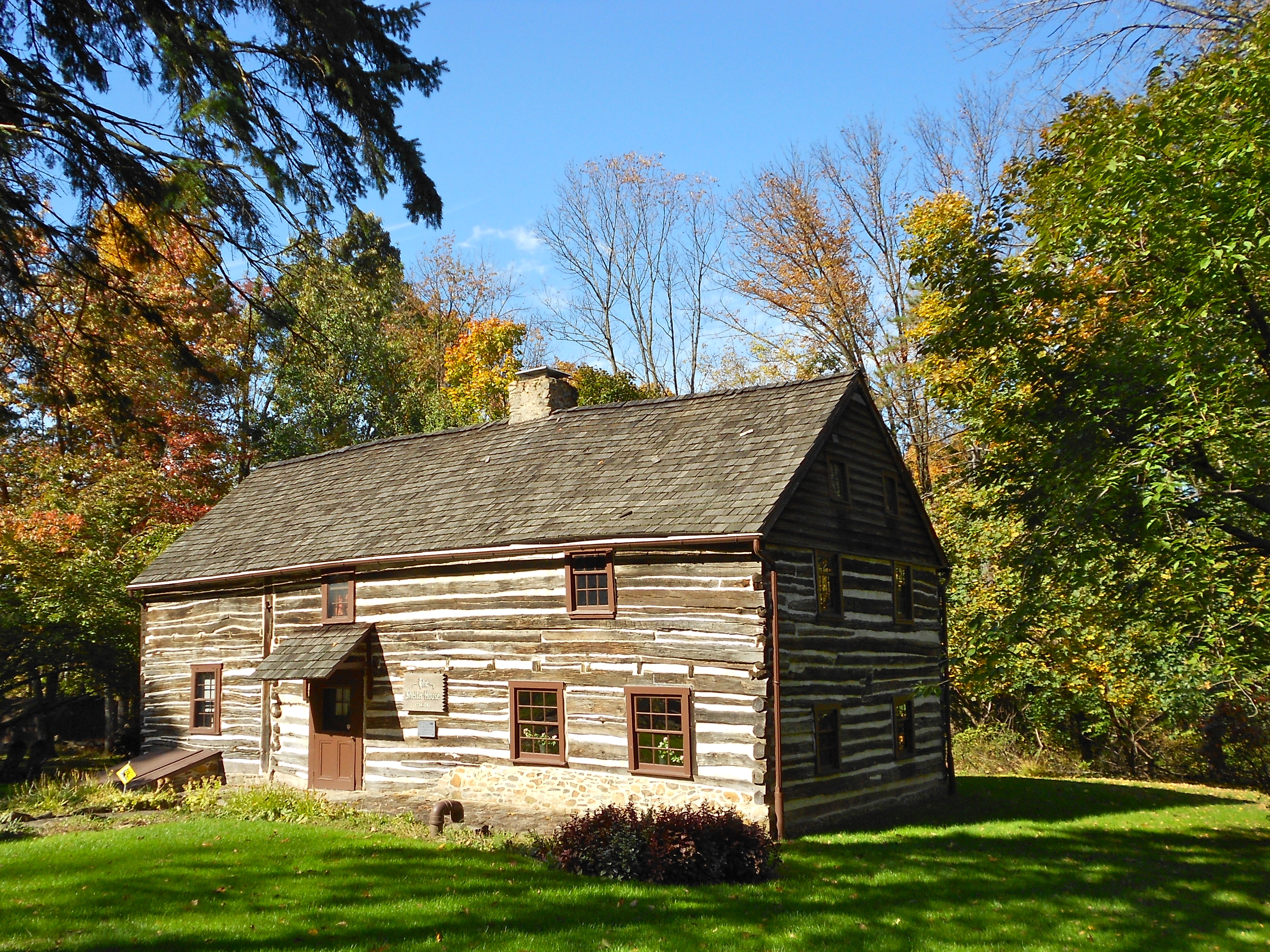
- Shelter House in Emmaus, Pennsylvania in October 2012

- Location within Pennsylvania Location within the United States
- Location: 601 S. 4th St., Emmaus, Pennsylvania, U.S.
- Coordinates: 40°31′50″N 75°29′6″W
- Area: 1 acre (0.40 ha)
- Built: c. 1734, 1741
- Architectural style: Germanic log house
- NRHP reference No.: 78002426
- Added to NRHP: February 17, 1978

Shelter House is a historic home located in Emmaus, Pennsylvania. Constructed in 1734, it is believed to be the oldest continuously occupied building structure in both Lehigh County and the Lehigh Valley and among the oldest still-standing building structures in the U.S. state of Pennsylvania.

== History ==
The first floor was built around 1734. In 1741, a three-room second story and a two-story annex were added. The house was built by early Pennsylvania German settlers and is a medieval-type Germanic log house made out of oak and chestnut and measuring approximately 40 feet by 25 feet. Mud, straw, and horse hair were used as the filling, or chinking, in between the gaps in the log walls, providing protection and insulation from outside elements. It has a gable roof and large, square stone chimney.

The Shelter House got its name from the German word "zufluchtshaus," meaning "house of refuge or shelter." The House is situated in a clearing of woods along a well-traveled Indian path and often served as a stopover for travelers. The house was inhabited at a time when there existed conflicts in the area between American settlers and British colonialists and Native Americans. Many years later after the founding of Emmaus in 1759, the House became a hostel and tavern for wayfarers.

In 1952, the cabin was purchased at a public sale by a group of preservationists who raised $35,000 to stabilize and restore the structure and its grounds. In 1963, the Borough of Emmaus assumed ownership of the property, while the Shelter House Society continues with the responsibility of maintenance and preservation.

In 1978, it was added to the National Register of Historic Places.
