= DeSales University, Pennsylvania =

Unincorporated community in Pennsylvania, US

DeSales University
- Census-designated place
- Location of DeSales University in Pennsylvania Location in the United States
- Coordinates: 40°32′21″N 75°22′38″W
- Country: United States
- State: Pennsylvania
- County: Lehigh
- Township: Upper Saucon Township

Area
  - Census-designated place: 0.60 sq mi (1.55 km^{2})
  - Land: 0.60 sq mi (1.55 km^{2})
  - Water: 0 sq mi (0.00 km^{2})
- Elevation: 450 ft (140 m)

Population (2020)
  - Census-designated place: 985
  - Density: 1,646.3/sq mi (635.63/km^{2})
  - Metro: 865,310 (US: 68th)
- Time zone: UTC-5 (Eastern (EST))
  - Summer (DST): UTC-4 (EDT)
- ZIP Code: 18034 (Center Valley)
- Area codes: 610 and 484
- FIPS code: 42-18998
- GNIS feature ID: 2633818

DeSales University (CDP) is a census-designated place located in Upper Saucon Township, Pennsylvania. As of the 2020 census, the population was 985 residents.

DeSales University is part of the Lehigh Valley metropolitan area, which had a population of 861,899 and was the 68th-most populous metropolitan area in the U.S. as of the 2020 census. It includes the main campus of DeSales University.

Historical population
Census	Pop.	Note	%±
2020	985		—
U.S. Decennial Census
