= Whitehall Parkway =

Coordinates: 40.671°N 75.524°W

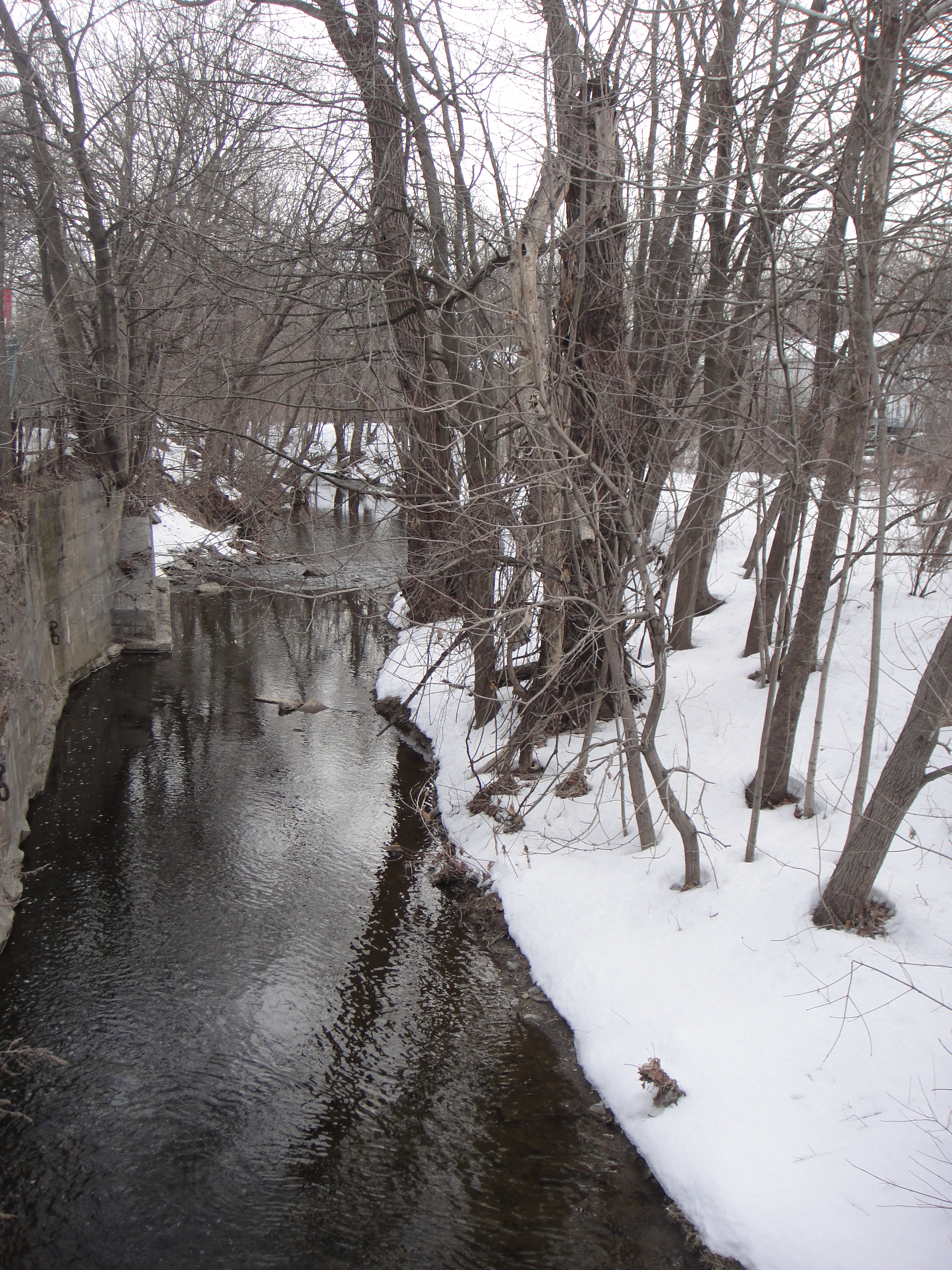
Coplay Creek passes through the center of Whitehall Parkway in Whitehall Township, March 2014

The Whitehall Parkway is a 110-acre park situated near the center of Whitehall Township, Pennsylvania in the Lehigh Valley region of eastern Pennsylvania. The parkway serves as a preserved green space in the center of the Township after the Township government acquired the property in 1990 and sought to preserve a mix of Whitehall's history, spanning from early settlers to recent cement and mining companies centered on the Coplay Creek, a tributary of the area's Lehigh River.

== History ==
The earliest recorded inhabitants of the land around the area now preserved by the Whitehall Parkway were the Lenni Lennape, a tribal nation native to the region. The Minsi, a subtribe of the Lenni Lenape had settled along the Lehigh river and were using the land for hunting and fishing when European settlers began to arrive to the Parkway area in the late 1600s and early 1700s.

After William Penn, Pennsylvania's namesake, received a deed from then King Charles II of England indicating his rights to the Province of Pennsylvania, he instead sought to acquire land fairly from the local tribes, purchasing tracts of land over time from the tribes. However, following his death, his son Thomas insisted that his father had received a deed from Lenni Lenape chiefs granting as much land as a man could walk in 1.5 days. This deed was never seen in a signed form and remains controversial today. However, the walk commenced, and became known as the Walking Purchase, commencing on September 19, 1737, and resulting in the acquisition of land that is now part of Carbon, Lehigh, Monroe, and Northampton counties.

One week later, on September 26, 1737, Johan Georg Kern and Georg Friedrich Newhardt, two immigrants from the Palatinate regions of Southwestern Germany arrived to the area and acquired a deed to 406 acres of land on February 1, 1743, which the pair split evenly on November 30, 1744. This land included the area now known as the Whitehall Parkway. Newhardt soon sold his land to Adam Deshler, who erected the historic Fort Deshler on the site in 1760. Local lore maintains that the Fort was staffed by soldiers who protected local citizen fleeing from an attack by the local Lenape tribes, though there is no immediate evidence indicating that the fort was staffed with military but may have been a place where the locals took refuge from the attacks. Kern later passed the land to his son, before it was sold to the cement companies that developed the land in that area.

== Current status ==
As of 2005, the Parkway was described in Township documents as located along "Church and Chestnut Streets," containing "an abandoned quarry, wetlands, floodplain, and the ruins of a late 19th -early 20th-century cement plant."

The official Township website currently notes that site is connected to the local Ironton Rail-Trail, referencing a former stretch of train tracks converted to recreational trails, and that it hosts an annual Civil War reenactment each June. Local media also notes that just off South Church Street, on the parkway's western edge, sits what is possibly the second oldest caboose in existence belonging to the former Reading Railroad company.
