= Ancient Oaks, Pennsylvania =

Unincorporated community in Pennsylvania, US

- Census-designated place
- Location of Ancient Oaks in Pennsylvania Location in the United States
- Coordinates: 40°32′09″N 75°35′24″W
- Country: United States
- State: Pennsylvania
- County: Lehigh
- Township: Lower Macungie Township

Area
  - Census-designated place: 2.42 sq mi (6.28 km^{2})
  - Land: 2.42 sq mi (6.28 km^{2})
  - Water: 0 sq mi (0.00 km^{2})
- Elevation: 394 ft (120 m)

Population (2020)
  - Census-designated place: 6,995
  - Density: 2,885.8/sq mi (1,114.22/km^{2})
  - Metro: 865,310 (US: 68th)
- Time zone: UTC-5 (EST)
  - Summer (DST): UTC-4 (EDT)
- ZIP Code: 18062
- Area code: 610
- FIPS code: 42-02416
- GNIS feature ID: 1168279
- Primary airport: Lehigh Valley International Airport
- Major hospital: Lehigh Valley Hospital–Cedar Crest
- School district: East Penn

Ancient Oaks is a census-designated place (CDP) in Lower Macungie Township in Lehigh County, Pennsylvania, United States. It is named after the housing subdivision named Ancient Oaks, located off PA Route 100 just north of Macungie. The population of Ancient Oaks was 6,995 at the 2020 census.

Ancient Oaks is a suburb of Allentown, the third-largest city in Pennsylvania. It is part of the Lehigh Valley metropolitan area, which had a population of 861,899 and was the 68th-most populous metropolitan area in the U.S. as of the 2020 census.

== Geography ==
Ancient Oaks is located in southern Lehigh County at 40°32′9″N 75°35′24″W (40.535715, -75.590045), northwest of the center of Lower Macungie Township. Pennsylvania Route 100 forms the southwestern edge of the community; the highway leads southeast 2 miles (3 km) to Macungie and northwest the same distance to U.S. Route 222 between Breinigsville and Trexlertown.

According to the U.S. Census Bureau, Ancient Oaks has a total area of 2.4 square miles (6.3 km^{2}), of which 0.4 acres (1,756 m^{2}), or 0.03%, are water. Little Lehigh Creek, a tributary of the Lehigh River and part of the Delaware River watershed, flows eastward through the village. Ancient Oaks uses the Macungie ZIP Code of 18062. The original subdivision was started in 1961 and completed in 1971. It was the first development of dense middle class housing in the Lehigh Valley. In 1972, Ancient Oaks West was started, made of single-family houses and townhomes. In 1985, Ancient Oaks South started, and construction lasted through 1989.

== Demographics ==
Historical population
| Census | Pop. | Note | %± |
|---|---|---|---|
| 2000 | 3,161 | | — |
| 2010 | 6,661 | | 110.7% |
| 2020 | 6,995 | | 5.0% |
U.S. Decennial Census

As of the 2000 census, there were 3,161 people, 1,097 households, and 944 families residing in the CDP. The population density was 1,440.0 inhabitants per square mile (556.0/km^{2}). There were 1,125 housing units at an average density of 512.5 per square mile (197.9/km^{2}). The racial makeup of the CDP was 95.95% White, 0.70% African American, 0.03% Native American, 2.66% Asian, 0.35% from other races, and 0.32% from two or more races. Hispanic or Latino of any race were 1.65% of the population.

There were 1,097 households, out of which 38.8% had children under the age of 18 living with them, 76.8% were married couples living together, 6.7% had a female householder with no husband present, and 13.9% were non-families. 11.1% of all households were made up of individuals, and 4.2% had someone living alone who was 65 years of age or older. The average household size was 2.88 and the average family size was 3.10.

The population of Ancient Oaks was spread out, with 27.2% under the age of 18, 4.9% from 18 to 24, 28.9% from 25 to 44, 28.1% from 45 to 64, and 10.9% who were 65 years of age or older. The median age was 38 years. For every 100 females, there were 103.0 males. For every 100 females age 18 and over, there were 101.9 males. The median income for a household in the CDP was $72,750, and the median income for a family was $76,376. Males had a median income of $51,824 versus $31,058 for females. The per capita income for the CDP was $26,360. About 0.7% of families and 1.1% of the population were below the poverty line, including 1.7% of those under age 18 and 1.3% of those aged 65 or over.

== Education ==
Ancient Oaks is served by the East Penn School District. Emmaus High School in Emmaus serves grades nine through 12. Eyer Middle School and Lower Macungie Middle School, both in Macungie, serve grades six through eight.
