= Lehigh County, Pennsylvania =

County in Pennsylvania, United States

- County
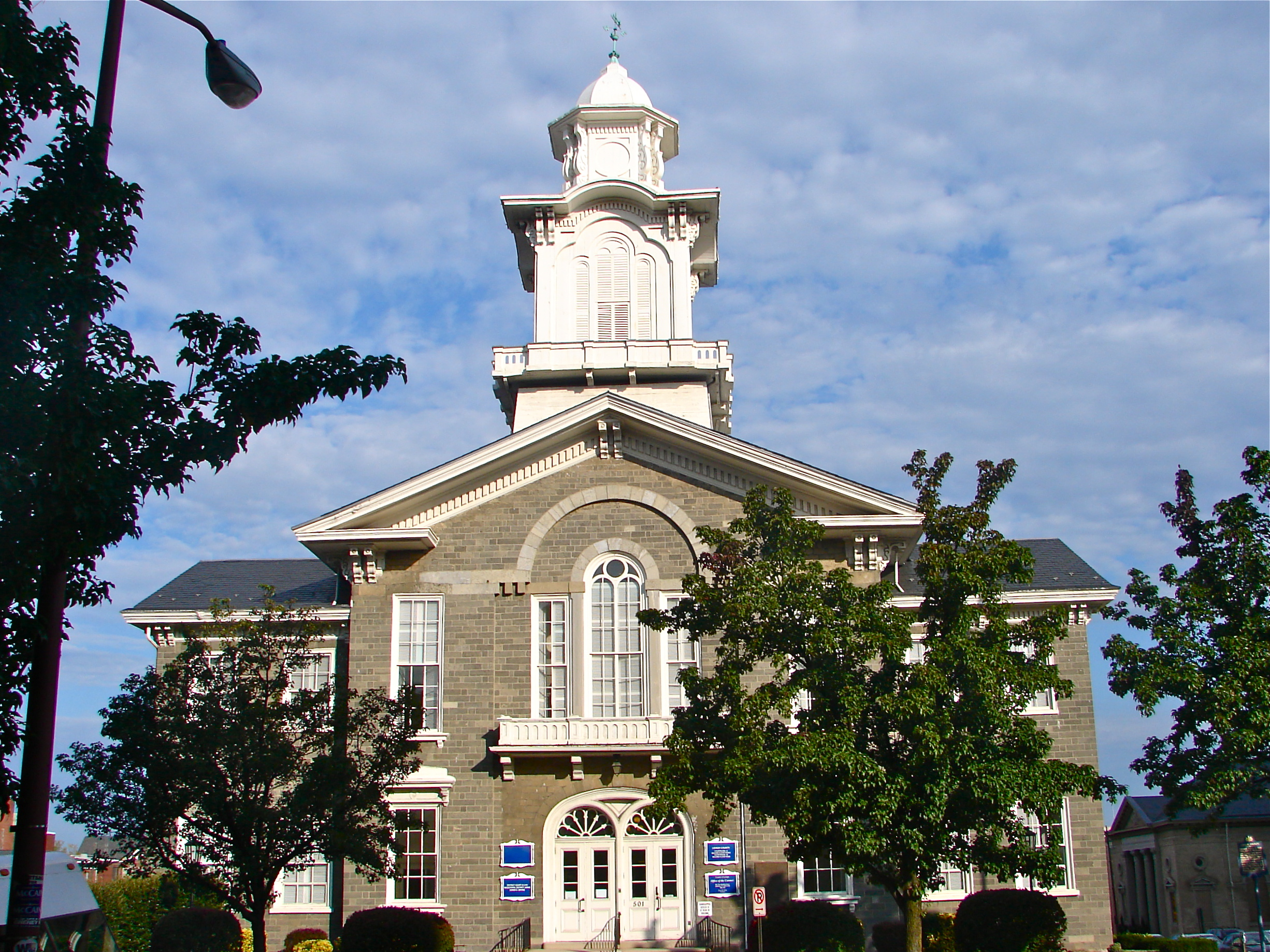
- Old Lehigh County Courthouse in Allentown, built between 1814 and 1819

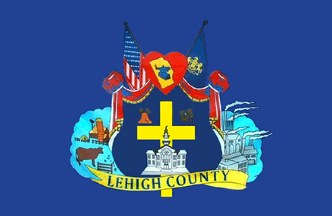
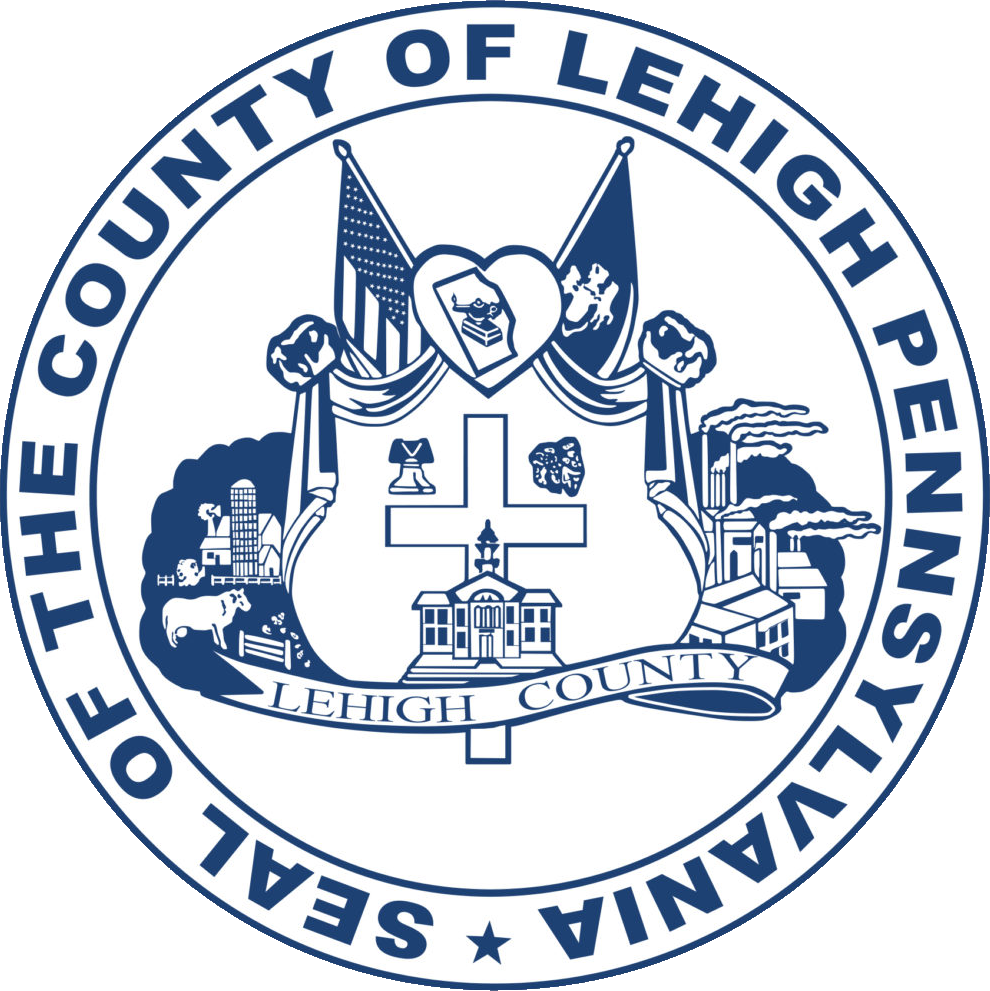
- Flag Seal

- Location within the U.S. state of Pennsylvania
- Coordinates: 40°37′N 75°35′W
- Country: United States
- State: Pennsylvania
- Founded: March 6, 1812
- Named for: Lehigh River
- Seat: Allentown
- Largest city: Allentown

Area
  - Total: 348 sq mi (900 km^{2})
  - Land: 345 sq mi (890 km^{2})
  - Water: 3.1 sq mi (8.0 km^{2}) 0.9%

Population (2020)
  - Total: 374,557
  - Estimate (2025): 384,383 ▲
  - Density: 1,046/sq mi (404/km^{2})
- Time zone: UTC−5 (Eastern)
  - Summer (DST): UTC−4 (EDT)
- Congressional district: 7th
- Website: www.lehighcounty.org

Lehigh County (/ˈliːhaɪ/; Pennsylvania Dutch: Lechaa Kaundi) is a county in the Commonwealth of Pennsylvania. As of the 2020 census, the county's population was 374,557. Its county seat is Allentown, the state's third-largest city after Philadelphia and Pittsburgh.

Lehigh County combines with Northampton County to its east to form the Lehigh Valley region of eastern Pennsylvania, the third-largest metropolitan area of Pennsylvania, with a population of 861,889 as of 2020. Lehigh County is one of the fastest-growing counties in Pennsylvania and the more highly populated of the two counties. Both counties are part of the Philadelphia television market, the fifth-largest television market in the nation.

The county is named for the Lehigh River, a 109-mile-long (175 km) tributary of the Delaware River, which flows through Lehigh County. During the Industrial Revolution, the Lehigh River served a vital role in the nation's development by offering one of the first transportation and trading routes for mining products, including anthracite, iron, manganese, limestone, and ultimately manufactured steel products.

Lehigh County falls geographically between two Pennsylvania Appalachian mountain ridges, Blue Mountain to the county's north and South Mountain to its south. Lehigh County borders Montgomery County to its south, Bucks County to its southeast, Northampton County to its east, Carbon County to its north, Schuylkill County to its northwest, and Berks County to its southwest.

The county is located 64 miles (103 km) northwest of Philadelphia and 93 miles (150 km) west of New York City.

== History ==
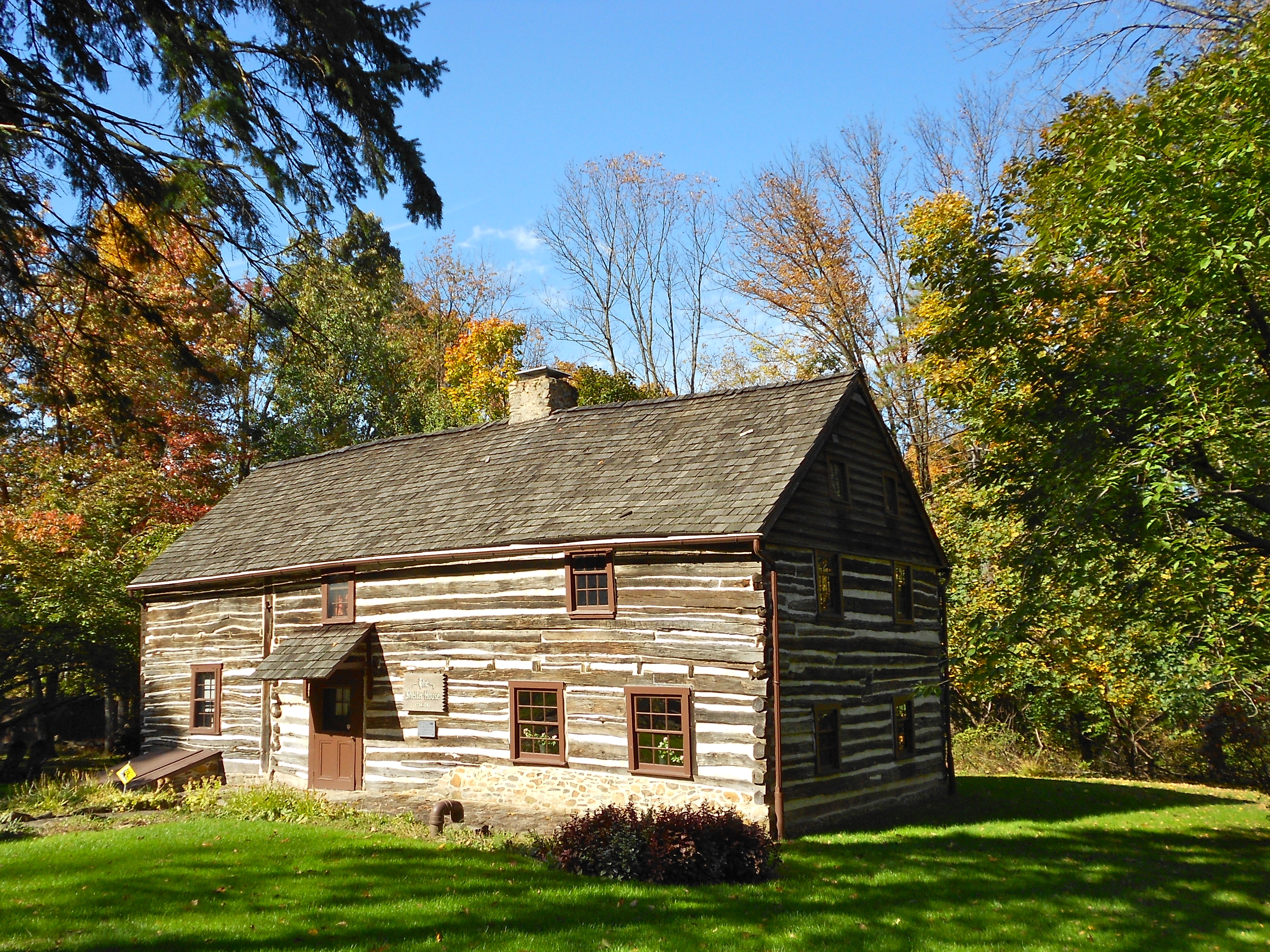
Shelter House in Emmaus, constructed in 1734 by Pennsylvania German settlers, is believed to be the oldest continuously occupied building structure in both Lehigh County and the Lehigh Valley and among the oldest still-standing building structures in Pennsylvania.

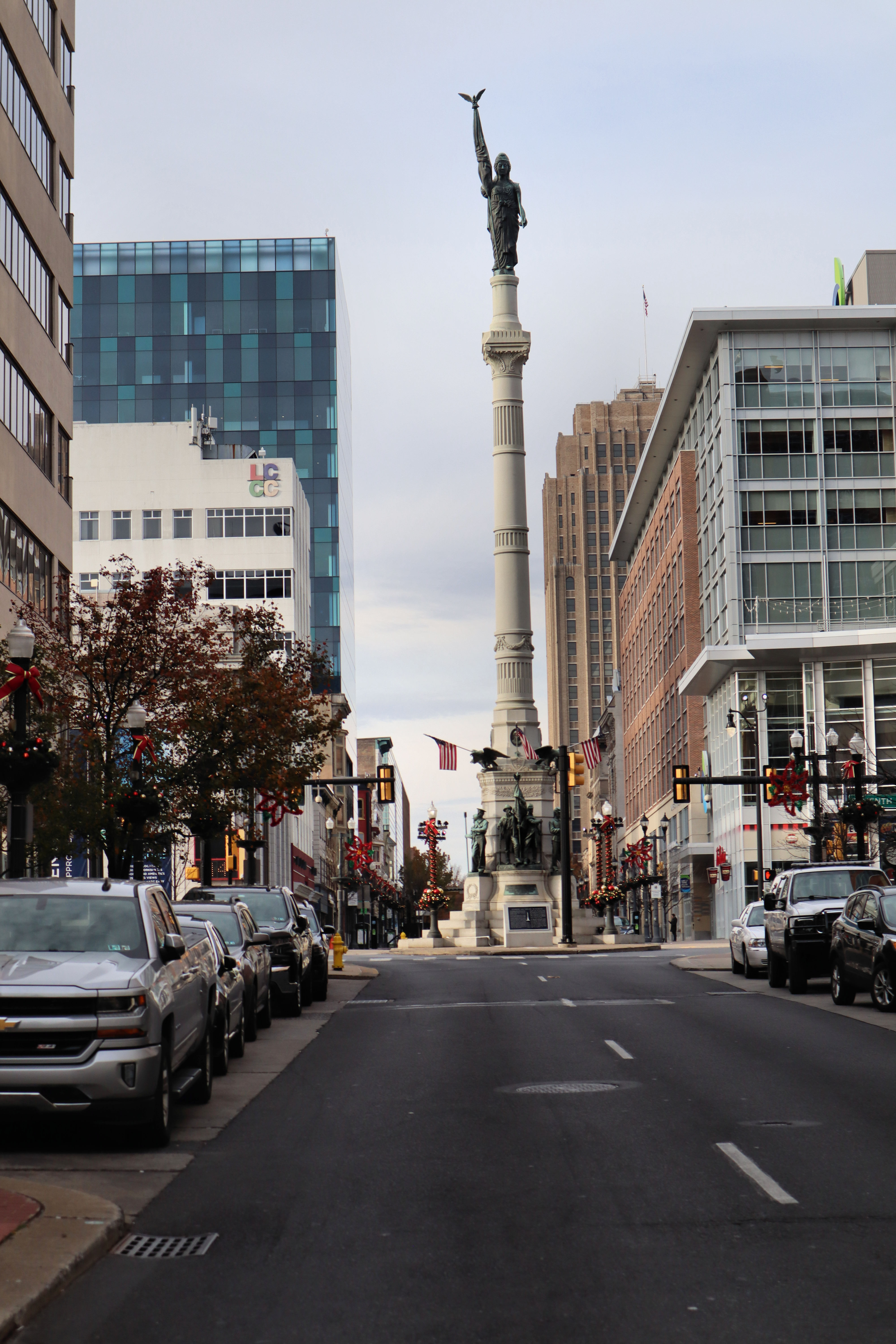
The Soldiers and Sailors Monument, erected in 1899 at 7th and Hamilton streets in Center City Allentown, honors men from Allentown and its suburbs killed in their volunteer service in the 47th Pennsylvania Infantry Regiment and other Union army units during the American Civil War.

=== Settlement and founding ===
Lehigh County was first settled around 1730 and was formed in 1812 when Northampton County was divided into two counties. The county is named after the Lehigh River, a 109-mile-long (175 km) river that runs through the county and whose name is derived from the Lenape Indian term Lechauweki or Lechauwekink, meaning "where there are forks." Shelter House, constructed in Emmaus in 1734 by Pennsylvania German settlers, is the oldest continuously occupied structure in both Lehigh County and Lehigh Valley and among the oldest still-standing building structures in the U.S. state of Pennsylvania.

=== American Revolution ===
Some of the first resistance to British colonialism, which led ultimately to the American Revolutionary War, began in present-day Lehigh County. On December 21, 1774, patriots in the area formed one of the colonies' first Committee of Observations. Following the Declaration of Independence, patriot militas pressured Tories out of Allentown and the surrounding area, and the colonial government in the area began to break down.

After Washington and the Continental Army were defeated at the Battle of Brandywine on September 11, 1777, the revolutionary capital of Philadelphia was left defenseless and Pennsylvania's Supreme Executive Council ordered that eleven Philadelphia bells, including the Liberty Bell (then known as the State House Bell), be taken down and moved to present day Allentown (then called Northampton Towne) and hidden in the basement of Zion Reformed Church on present day West Hamilton Street to protect them from being melted down by the British Army for use as munitions.

=== Industrial Revolution ===
The opening of the Lehigh Canal beginning in 1827 transformed Allentown and Lehigh County from a rural agricultural area dominated by German-speaking people into an urbanized industrialized area and expanded the city's commercial and industrial capacity greatly. With this, Lehigh County underwent significant industrialization, ultimately becoming a major 20th century center for heavy industry and manufacturing and one of several hubs for the Industrial Revolution.

=== American Civil War ===
Following the Union army's defeat at the Battle of Fort Sumter and Lincoln's April 15, 1861, proclamation calling for state militia to provide 75,000 volunteer troops to defend the nation's capital of Washington, D.C., Allentown deployed the Allen Infantry, also known as the Allen Guards and composed of volunteers from Allentown and its surrounding suburbs. The unit mustered in for duty on April 18, 1861. As the Civil War progressed, multiple Union army units were drawn from Lehigh County, including roughly seventy percent of the 47th Pennsylvania Infantry Regiment.

On October 19, 1899, a monument in honor of the Lehigh County men killed in their volunteer service to preservation of the Union, the Soldiers and Sailors Monument, was erected at Seventh and Hamilton streets in Center City Allentown, where it still stands.

== Geography ==
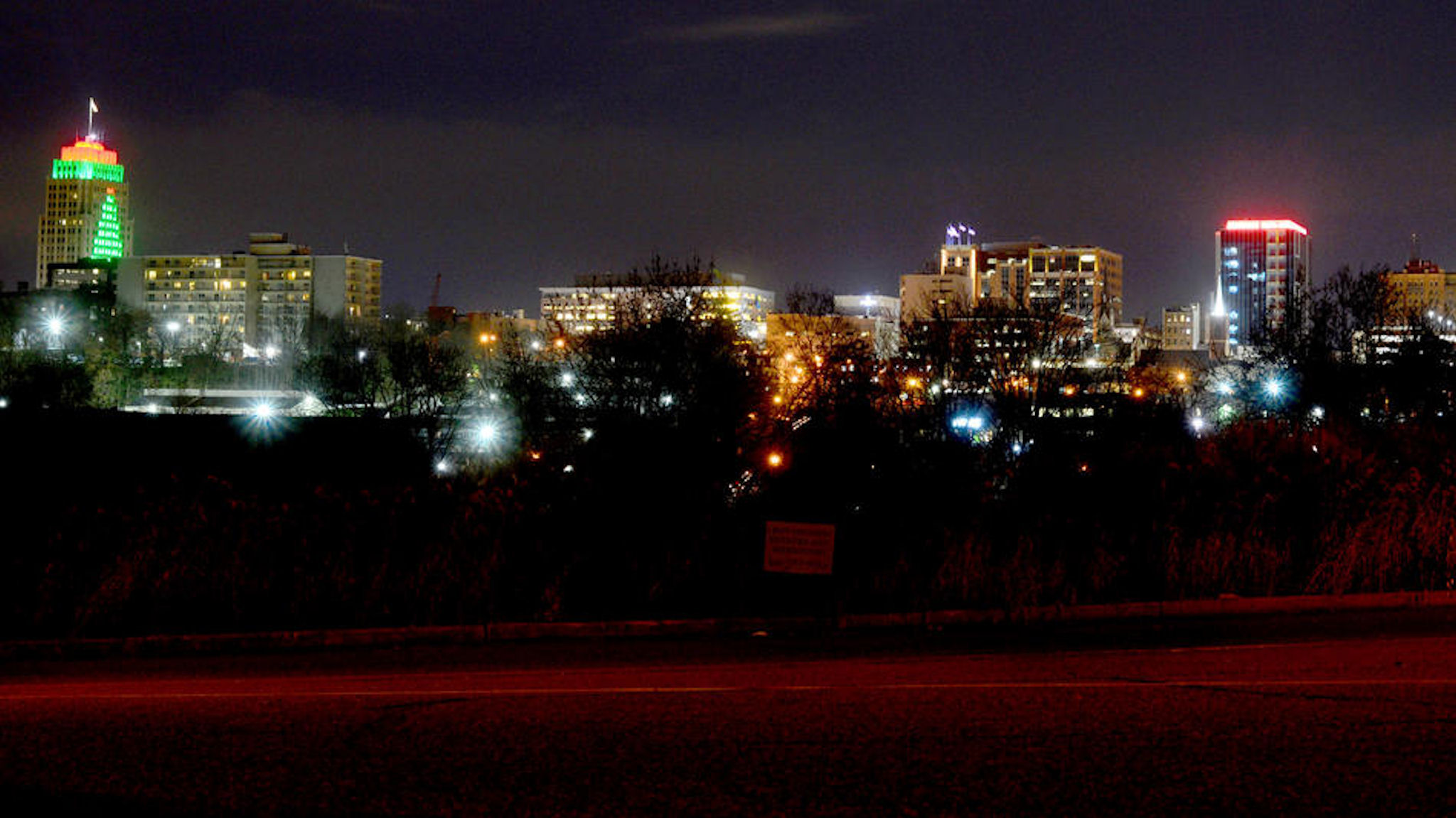
The city skyline of Allentown, Lehigh County's largest city, at Christmas 2017

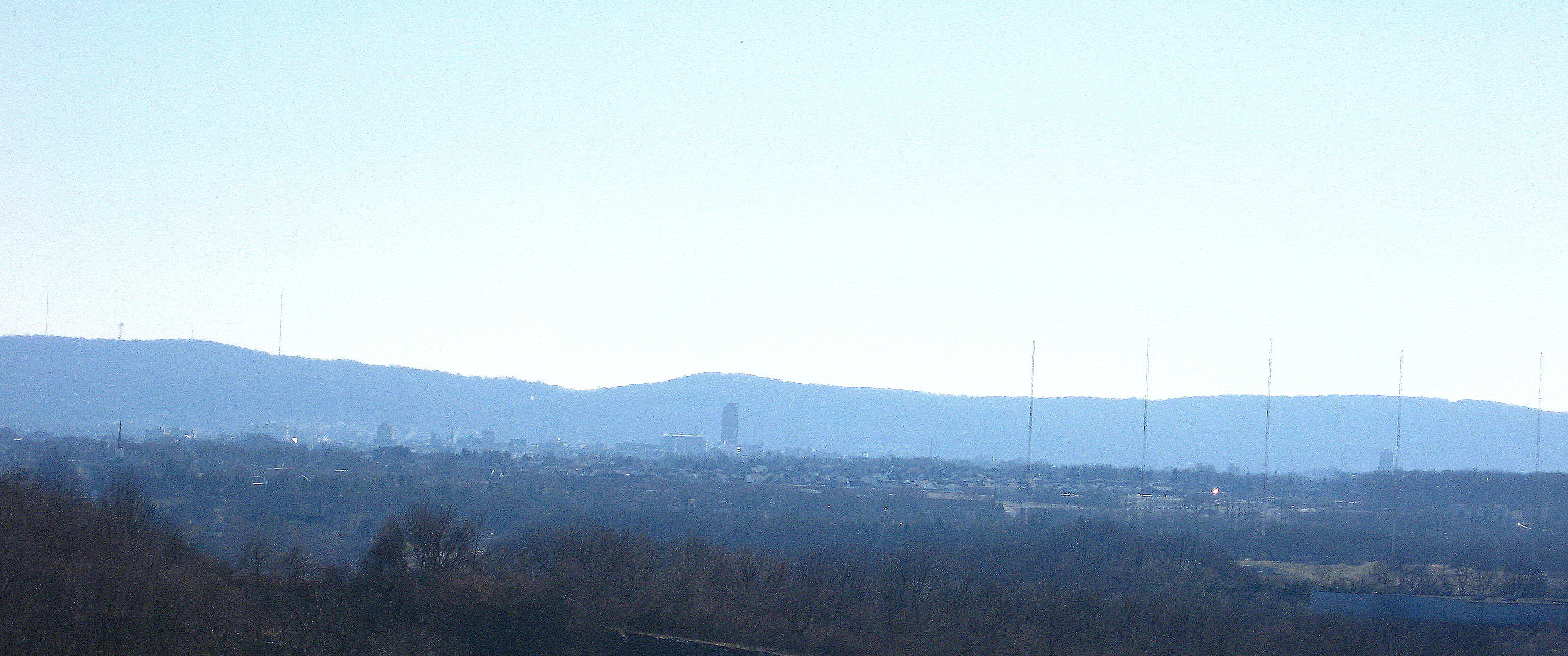
South Mountain, part of the Appalachian Mountain range in Lehigh County, with Allentown in the foreground in December 2010

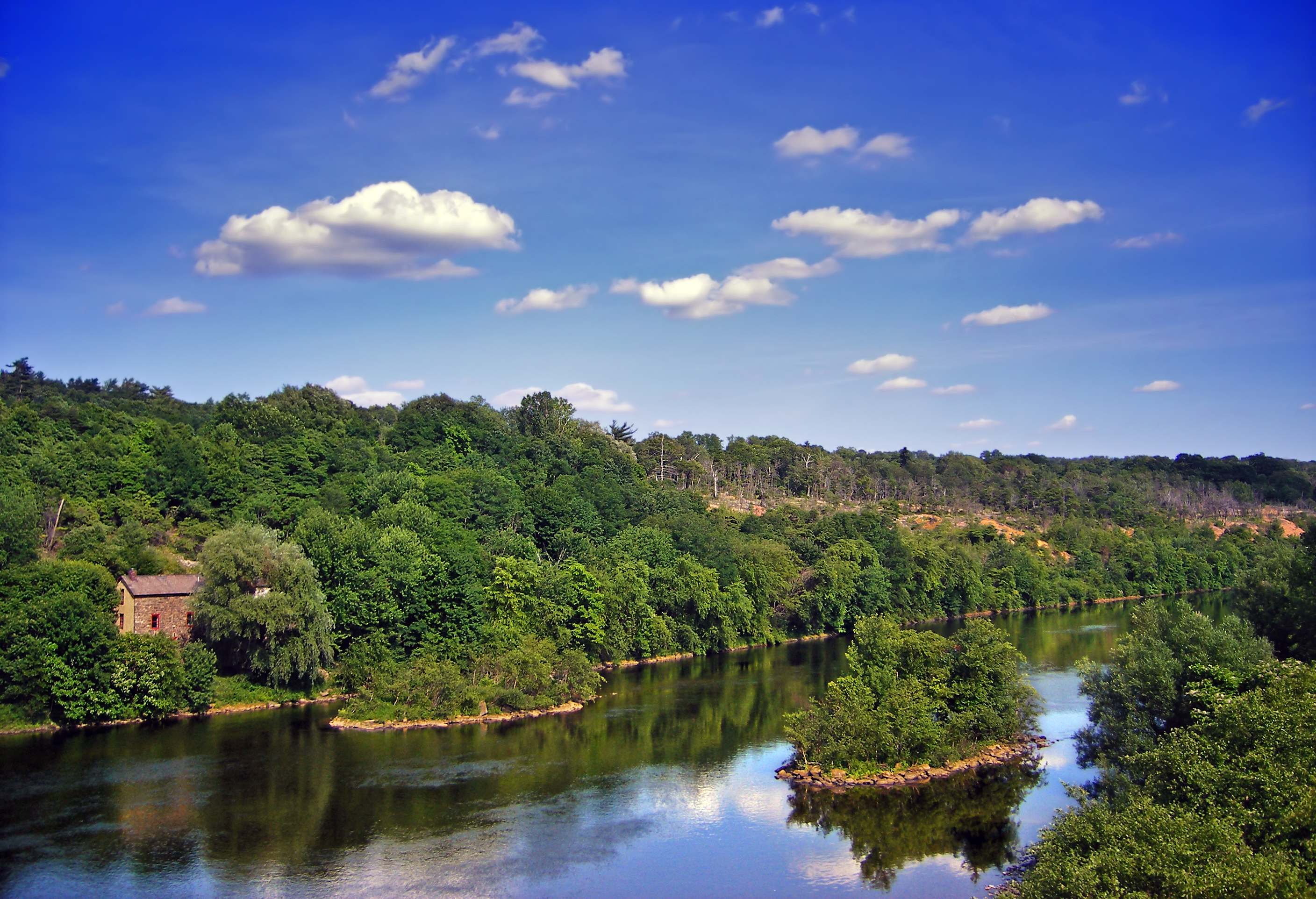
Lehigh River, a 109-mile-long (175 km) tributary of the Delaware River, in Lehigh County near Slatington in June 2007

Lehigh County has a total area of 348 square miles (900 km^{2}), 345 square miles (890 km^{2}) of which is land and 3.1 square miles (8.0 km^{2}) (0.9%) of which is water.

=== Topography ===
Lehigh County borders two Appalachian mountain ridges. To the north, the county borders Blue Mountain, which has an altitude of 1,300 to 1,604 feet (396 to 489 m). To the south, it is bordered by South Mountain, which has an altitude of 700 to 1,100 feet (210 to 340 m) and cuts through the southern portions of both Lehigh and Northampton counties. The Lehigh County's highest point is near Germansville at Bake Oven Knob, a mass of Tuscarora conglomeratic rocks that rise about 100 feet (30 m) above the main Blue Mountain ridge in northwestern Heidelberg Township.

Lehigh County is part of the Delaware River watershed. Most of the county is drained by the Lehigh River and its tributaries, though the Schuylkill River also drains regions in the county's south through Perkiomen Creek and in the county's northwest through Maiden Creek.

=== Adjacent counties ===
- Carbon County (north)
- Northampton County (northeast)
- Bucks County (southeast)
- Montgomery County (south)
- Berks County (west)
- Schuylkill County (northwest)

=== Climate ===
Lehigh County's climate falls in the humid continental climate zone. The variety is hot-summer (Dfa) except in the county's higher elevation areas, where it is warm-summer (Dfb). Summers are typically hot and muggy, fall and spring are generally mild, and winter is cold. Precipitation is almost uniformly distributed throughout the year.

In Allentown, January lows average −6 °C (21 °F) and highs average 1.3 °C (34.3 °F). The lowest officially recorded temperature was −26.7 °C (−16.1 °F) in 1912. July lows average 17.6 °C (63.7 °F) and highs average 29.2 °C (84.6 °F) with an average relative humidity of 82%. The highest temperature on record was 40.6 °C (105.1 °F) in 1966. Early fall and mid-winter are generally driest with October being the driest month with only 74.7 mm of average precipitation.

Snowfall is variable with some winters bringing light snow and others bringing numerous significant snowstorms. Average snowfall is 82.3 centimetres (32.4 in) per year, with the months of January and February receiving the most now with just over 22.86 centimetres (9.00 in) in each of these months. Rainfall is generally spread throughout the year with eight to twelve wet days per month, at an average annual rate of 110.54 centimetres (43.52 in). The hardiness zone in the majority of the county has increased from 6b to 7a. 6b still exists in some northern and higher areas.

Climate data for Allentown, Pennsylvania (Lehigh Valley International Airport) 1991-2020 normals (Records x-2021)
Month	Jan	Feb	Mar	Apr	May	Jun	Jul	Aug	Sep	Oct	Nov	Dec	Year
Record high °F (°C)	72 (22)	81 (27)	87 (31)	93 (34)	97 (36)	100 (38)	105 (41)	100 (38)	99 (37)	93 (34)	81 (27)	72 (22)	105 (41)
Mean daily maximum °F (°C)	38.4 (3.6)	41.6 (5.3)	50.8 (10.4)	63.4 (17.4)	73.5 (23.1)	81.9 (27.7)	86.4 (30.2)	84.3 (29.1)	77.4 (25.2)	65.5 (18.6)	53.8 (12.1)	43.1 (6.2)	63.3 (17.4)
Daily mean °F (°C)	30.1 (−1.1)	32.4 (0.2)	40.7 (4.8)	51.8 (11.0)	62.0 (16.7)	70.9 (21.6)	75.6 (24.2)	73.6 (23.1)	66.3 (19.1)	54.6 (12.6)	43.9 (6.6)	35.0 (1.7)	53.1 (11.7)
Mean daily minimum °F (°C)	21.8 (−5.7)	23.2 (−4.9)	30.5 (−0.8)	40.3 (4.6)	50.6 (10.3)	59.9 (15.5)	64.7 (18.2)	62.8 (17.1)	55.2 (12.9)	43.8 (6.6)	34.1 (1.2)	26.8 (−2.9)	42.8 (6.0)
Record low °F (°C)	−15 (−26)	−12 (−24)	−5 (−21)	12 (−11)	28 (−2)	39 (4)	46 (8)	41 (5)	30 (−1)	21 (−6)	3 (−16)	−8 (−22)	−15 (−26)
Average precipitation inches (mm)	3.30 (84)	2.77 (70)	3.63 (92)	3.67 (93)	3.65 (93)	4.40 (112)	5.30 (135)	4.56 (116)	4.84 (123)	4.14 (105)	3.24 (82)	3.86 (98)	47.36 (1,203)
Average snowfall inches (cm)	9.8 (25)	10.8 (27)	6.3 (16)	0.5 (1.3)	0.0 (0.0)	0.0 (0.0)	0.0 (0.0)	0.0 (0.0)	0.0 (0.0)	0.2 (0.51)	0.9 (2.3)	4.6 (12)	33.1 (84)
Average precipitation days (≥ 0.01 in)	11	10	11	12	12	11	11	10	10	10	9	12	129
Average snowy days (≥ 0.1 in)	5	4	3	0	0	0	0	0	0	0	1	3	16
Source: NOAA

== Demographics ==
Historical population
Census	Pop.	Note	%±
1820	18,895		—
1830	22,256		17.8%
1840	25,787		15.9%
1850	32,479		26.0%
1860	43,753		34.7%
1870	56,796		29.8%
1880	65,969		16.2%
1890	76,631		16.2%
1900	93,893		22.5%
1910	118,832		26.6%
1920	148,101		24.6%
1930	172,893		16.7%
1940	177,533		2.7%
1950	198,207		11.6%
1960	227,536		14.8%
1970	255,304		12.2%
1980	272,349		6.7%
1990	291,130		6.9%
2000	312,090		7.2%
2010	349,497		12.0%
2020	374,557		7.2%
2025 (est.)	384,383	▲	2.6%
U.S. Decennial Census; 1790-1960 1900-1990; 1990-2000 2010-2019

=== 2020 census ===
As of the 2020 census, the county had a population of 374,557, a median age of 40.1 years, 22.1% of residents under the age of 18, 17.8% of residents 65 years of age or older, 93.9 males for every 100 females, and 91.1 males for every 100 females age 18 and over. The county's population growth of 7.2% since 2010 is among the fastest in the state.

As of the 2020 census, the racial makeup of the county was 65.3% White, 7.4% Black or African American, 0.4% American Indian and Alaska Native, 3.7% Asian, less than 0.1% Native Hawaiian and Pacific Islander, 13.1% from some other race, and 10.1% from two or more races, while Hispanic or Latino residents of any race comprised 25.9% of the population.

As of the 2020 census, 90.1% of residents lived in urban areas and 9.9% lived in rural areas.

There were 142,970 households in the county, of which 30.8% had children under the age of 18 living in them; 47.0% were married-couple households, 17.3% were households with a male householder and no spouse or partner present, 27.5% were households with a female householder and no spouse or partner present, 26.4% of all households were made up of individuals, and 11.8% had someone living alone who was 65 years of age or older.

There were 149,830 housing units, of which 4.6% were vacant, and among occupied housing units 64.2% were owner-occupied and 35.8% were renter-occupied; the homeowner vacancy rate was 0.9% and the rental vacancy rate was 4.9%.

=== Racial and ethnic composition ===
Lehigh County, Pennsylvania – Racial and ethnic composition Note: the US Census treats Hispanic/Latino as an ethnic category. This table excludes Latinos from the racial categories and assigns them to a separate category. Hispanics/Latinos may be of any race.
Race / Ethnicity (NH = Non-Hispanic)	Pop 1980	Pop 1990	Pop 2000	Pop 2010	Pop 2020	% 1980	% 1990	% 2000	% 2010	% 2020
White alone (NH)	259,022	265,946	259,811	250,245	227,994	95.11%	91.35%	83.25%	71.60%	60.87%
Black or African American alone (NH)	3,961	6,107	9,798	17,230	22,950	1.45%	2.10%	3.14%	4.93%	6.13%
Native American or Alaska Native alone (NH)	147	251	317	442	337	0.05%	0.09%	0.10%	0.13%	0.09%
Asian alone (NH)	1,449	3,573	6,488	10,090	13,725	0.53%	1.23%	2.08%	2.89%	3.66%
Native Hawaiian or Pacific Islander alone (NH)	x	x	82	65	91	x	x	0.03%	0.02%	0.02%
Other race alone (NH)	742	252	331	555	1,779	0.27%	0.09%	0.11%	0.16%	0.47%
Mixed race or Multiracial (NH)	x	x	3,382	5,255	10,700	x	x	1.08%	1.50%	2.86%
Hispanic or Latino (any race)	7,028	15,001	31,881	65,615	96,981	2.58%	5.15%	10.22%	18.77%	25.89%
Total	272,349	291,130	312,090	349,497	374,557	100.00%	100.00%	100.00%	100.00%	100.00%

== Politics and government ==
As of March 4, 2024, there were 243,427 registered voters in Lehigh County:

- Democratic: 111,646 (45.86%)
- Republican: 84,937 (34.89%)
- No affiliation: 38,901 (15.98)
- Other parties: 7,943 (3.27%)

Lehigh County leans Democratic, but is still politically competitive. Lehigh County and neighboring Northampton County are part of Pennsylvania's 7th Congressional district. The 7th Congressional district is a contentious swing district with neither Republicans nor Democrats winning the district consistently. Voters elected Republican Charlie Dent in 2004, 2006, and 2008 and, previously, Republican Pat Toomey in 1998, 2000, and 2002. In 2004, the county narrowly voted for John Kerry over George W. Bush for President. In 2008, all statewide Democratic candidates won the county with significant leads and, in the presidential election, Barack Obama won the county, 57.1% to 41.5%, over John McCain. In the 2012 presidential election, Obama again carried the county but by a narrower margin, 53.17% to 45.52%.

United States presidential election results for Lehigh County, Pennsylvania
Year	Republican		Democratic		Third party(ies)	
Year	No.	%	No.	%	No.	%
1880	6,144	42.49%	8,292	57.35%	23	0.16%
1884	6,357	43.72%	8,095	55.67%	88	0.61%
1888	6,977	43.35%	8,927	55.47%	190	1.18%
1892	7,089	41.65%	9,699	56.99%	231	1.36%
1896	9,507	48.90%	9,369	48.19%	567	2.92%
1900	9,775	47.64%	10,438	50.87%	304	1.48%
1904	11,826	52.89%	10,138	45.34%	394	1.76%
1908	11,593	48.80%	11,285	47.50%	879	3.70%
1912	2,722	12.20%	10,834	48.56%	8,755	39.24%
1916	10,588	44.67%	11,920	50.29%	1,194	5.04%
1920	18,032	59.49%	10,863	35.84%	1,415	4.67%
1924	20,826	59.02%	10,415	29.52%	4,043	11.46%
1928	40,291	74.35%	13,463	24.84%	434	0.80%
1932	21,169	46.95%	21,939	48.65%	1,985	4.40%
1936	25,841	41.27%	35,325	56.41%	1,455	2.32%
1940	29,584	47.00%	33,007	52.43%	359	0.57%
1944	31,584	51.75%	29,134	47.73%	315	0.52%
1948	32,202	53.65%	26,826	44.69%	994	1.66%
1952	45,143	57.52%	33,033	42.09%	303	0.39%
1956	50,564	63.30%	29,067	36.39%	251	0.31%
1960	54,278	57.64%	39,640	42.10%	249	0.26%
1964	32,245	34.64%	60,377	64.86%	471	0.51%
1968	47,255	49.53%	44,033	46.15%	4,120	4.32%
1972	58,023	62.39%	33,325	35.83%	1,654	1.78%
1976	46,895	49.20%	46,620	48.92%	1,793	1.88%
1980	50,782	52.91%	34,827	36.28%	10,376	10.81%
1984	61,799	59.69%	41,089	39.69%	649	0.63%
1988	56,363	56.30%	42,801	42.76%	943	0.94%
1992	42,631	37.12%	46,711	40.68%	25,494	22.20%
1996	45,103	42.51%	48,568	45.77%	12,439	11.72%
2000	55,492	47.71%	56,667	48.72%	4,148	3.57%
2004	70,160	48.36%	73,940	50.96%	991	0.68%
2008	63,382	41.57%	87,089	57.12%	2,002	1.31%
2012	66,874	45.42%	78,283	53.17%	2,067	1.40%
2016	73,690	45.28%	81,324	49.97%	7,719	4.74%
2020	84,418	45.47%	98,498	53.05%	2,739	1.48%
2024	91,207	47.91%	96,317	50.60%	2,844	1.49%

United States Senate election results for Lehigh County, Pennsylvania1
Year	Republican		Democratic		Third party(ies)	
Year	No.	%	No.	%	No.	%
1994	39,768	51.95%	33,694	44.01%	3,094	4.04%
2000	63,025	57.21%	45,148	40.98%	1,988	1.80%
2006	39,461	42.29%	53,855	57.71%	0	0.00%
2012	62,071	43.01%	79,527	55.11%	2,712	1.88%
2018	52,576	40.93%	73,632	57.33%	2,230	1.74%
2024	87,147	46.46%	94,875	50.58%	5,562	2.97%

United States Senate election results for Lehigh County, Pennsylvania3
Year	Republican		Democratic		Third party(ies)	
Year	No.	%	No.	%	No.	%
1992	53,763	48.59%	53,125	48.01%	3,759	3.40%
1998	48,627	65.46%	22,484	30.27%	3,171	4.27%
2004	73,191	53.41%	58,057	42.37%	5,783	4.22%
2010	50,341	52.55%	45,455	47.45%	0	0.00%
2016	76,216	47.61%	77,232	48.25%	6,627	4.14%
2022	59,219	43.45%	73,096	53.63%	3,986	2.92%

Pennsylvania Gubernatorial election results for Lehigh County
Year	Republican		Democratic		Third party(ies)	
Year	No.	%	No.	%	No.	%
1970	26,910	37.05%	43,582	60.00%	2,144	2.95%
1974	29,753	43.28%	38,150	55.49%	846	1.23%
1978	40,509	58.20%	28,516	40.97%	578	0.83%
1982	42,137	56.73%	31,413	42.29%	723	0.97%
1986	38,984	54.94%	31,174	43.93%	799	1.13%
1990	24,519	36.51%	42,592	63.42%	44	0.07%
1994	41,767	53.82%	27,970	36.04%	7,863	10.13%
1998	50,526	65.79%	22,472	29.26%	3,800	4.95%
2002	34,738	40.92%	48,150	56.72%	2,008	2.37%
2006	34,692	36.89%	59,338	63.11%	0	0.00%
2010	52,769	54.95%	43,261	45.05%	0	0.00%
2014	36,894	45.24%	44,658	54.76%	0	0.00%
2018	49,071	38.16%	77,248	60.07%	2,287	1.78%
2022	53,468	39.22%	79,991	58.67%	2,875	2.11%

=== State House of Representatives ===
District	Representative	Party
22	Vacant	
131	Milou Mackenzie	Republican
132	Michael H. Schlossberg	Democratic
133	Jeanne McNeill	Democratic
134	Peter Schweyer	Democratic
183	Zach Mako	Republican
187	Gary Day	Republican

=== State Senate ===
District	Representative	Party
14	Nick Miller	Democratic
16	Jarrett Coleman	Republican
18	Lisa Boscola	Democratic

=== U.S. House of Representatives ===
- Ryan Mackenzie, Republican, Pennsylvania's 7th congressional district

== Education ==
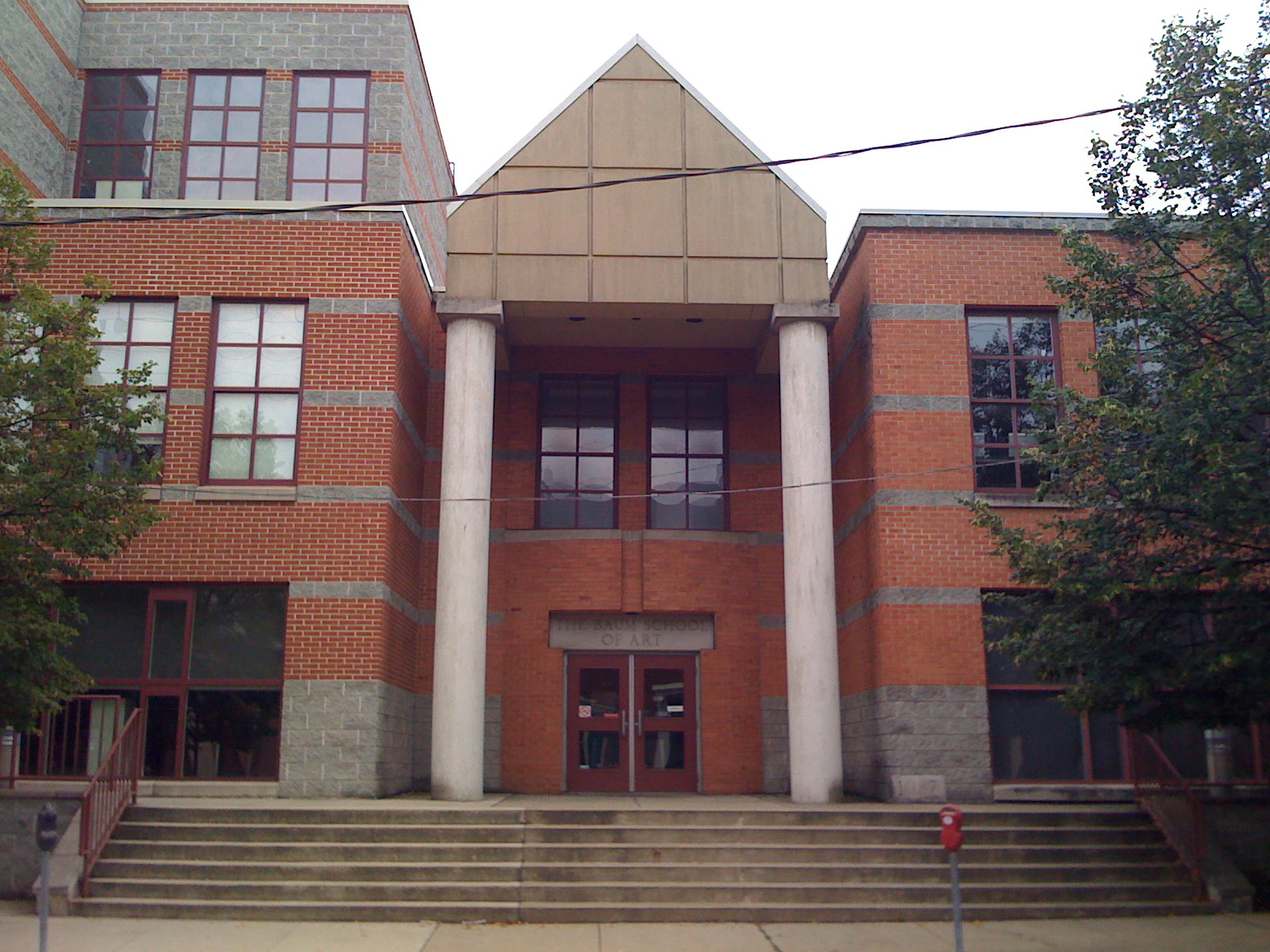
Baum School of Art in Allentown in January 2009

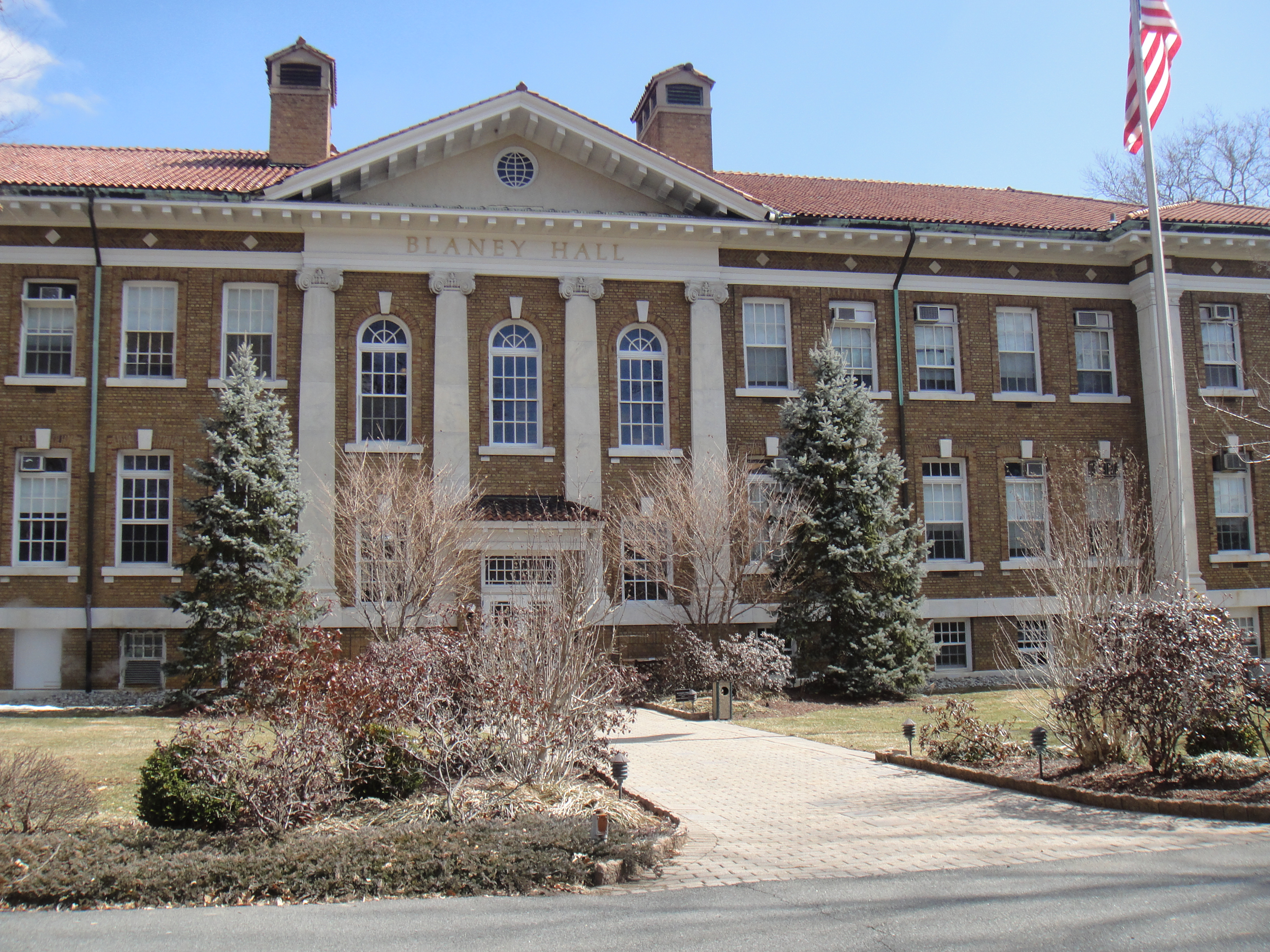
Cedar Crest College in Allentown in March 2014

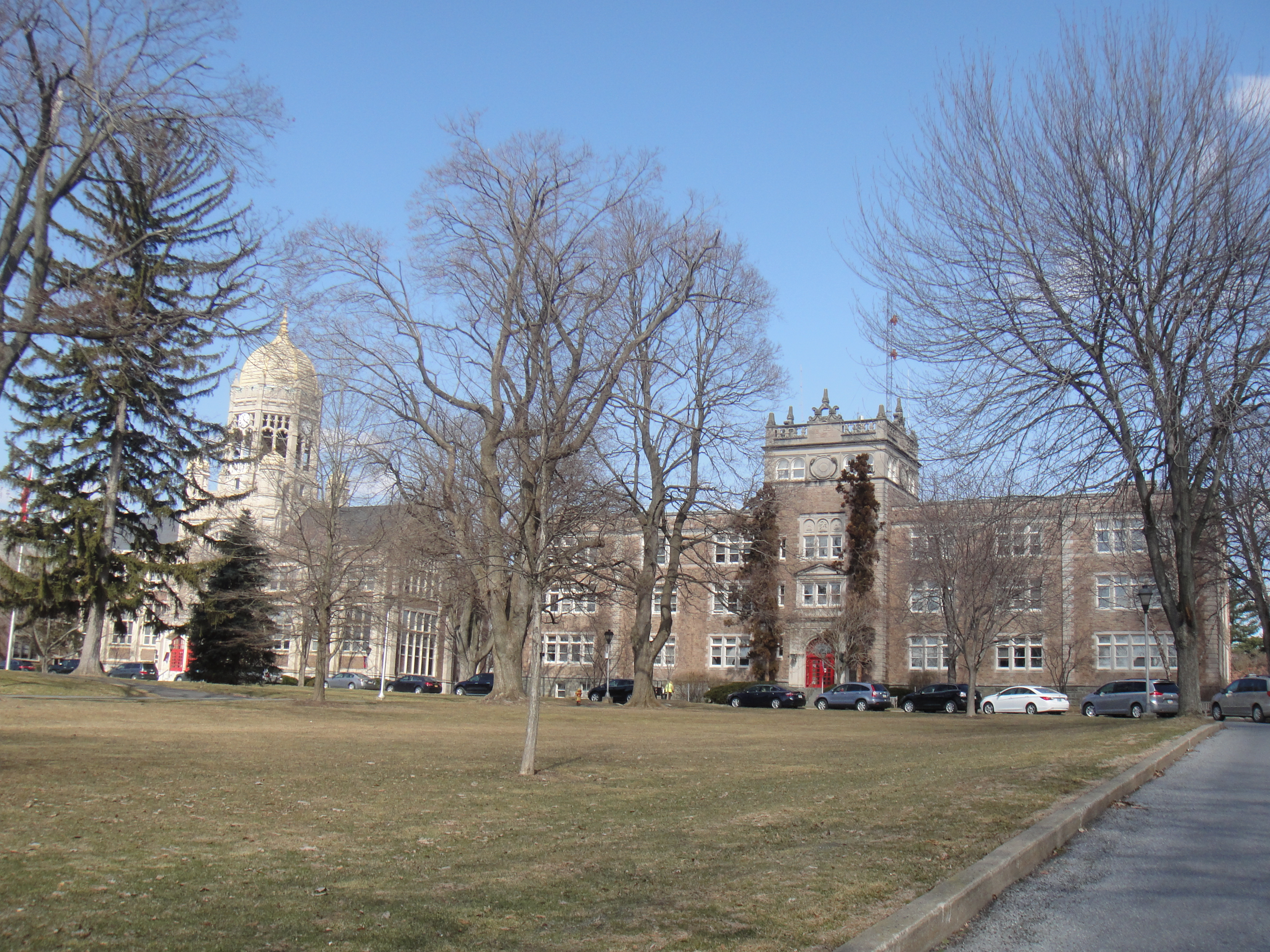
Muhlenberg College in Allentown in March 2014

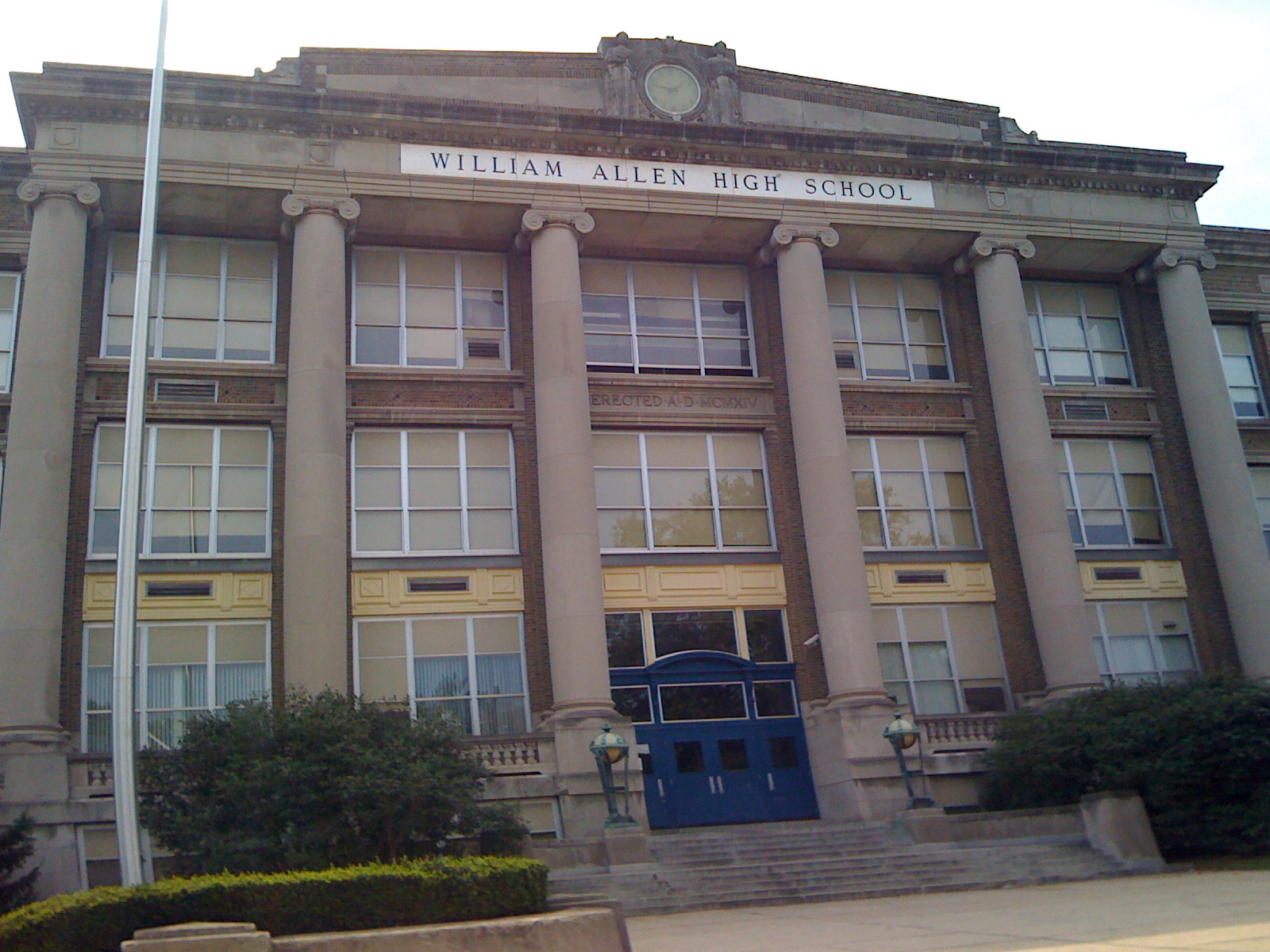
Allen High School, one of Allentown's two large public high schools, in July 2008

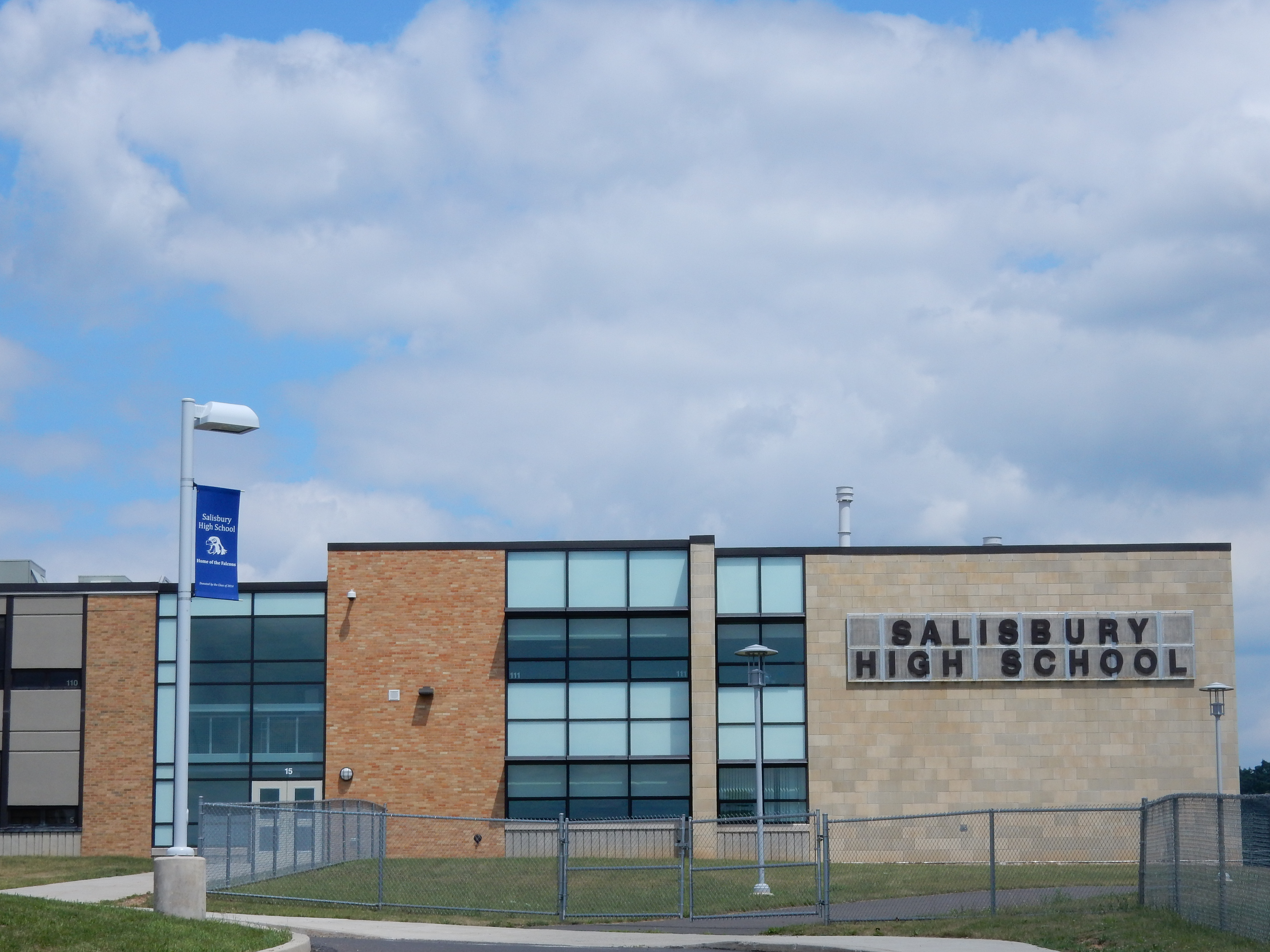
Salisbury High School in Salisbury Township in June 2015

=== Four-year colleges and universities ===
- Cedar Crest College in Allentown
- DeSales University in Center Valley
- Muhlenberg College in Allentown
- Penn State Lehigh Valley in Center Valley

=== Two-year colleges and technical institutes ===
- Baum School of Art in Allentown
- Lehigh Carbon Community College in Schnecksville (main campus), and Donley Center in Allentown (satellite campus)
- Lincoln Tech in Allentown

=== Public school districts ===
School districts include:

- Allentown School District
  - William Allen High School in Allentown
  - Louis E. Dieruff High School in Allentown
- Bethlehem Area School District
- Catasauqua Area School District
  - Catasauqua High School in Northampton
- East Penn School District
  - Emmaus High School in Emmaus
- Northern Lehigh School District
  - Northern Lehigh High School in Slatington
- Northwestern Lehigh School District
  - Northwestern Lehigh High School in New Tripoli
- Parkland School District
  - Parkland High School in South Whitehall Township
- Salisbury Township School District
  - Salisbury High School in Salisbury Township
- Southern Lehigh School District
  - Southern Lehigh High School in Center Valley
- Whitehall-Coplay School District
  - Whitehall High School in Whitehall Township

=== Public charter schools ===
- Lincoln Leadership Academy Charter School in Allentown
- Roberto Clemente Charter School in Allentown
- Seven Generations Charter School in Emmaus

=== Private high schools ===
- Allentown Central Catholic High School in Allentown
- Salem Christian School in Macungie

=== Vocational high school ===
- Lehigh Career and Technical Institute in Schnecksville

=== Public libraries ===
- Allentown Public Library in Allentown

== Transportation and infrastructure ==
=== Air ===
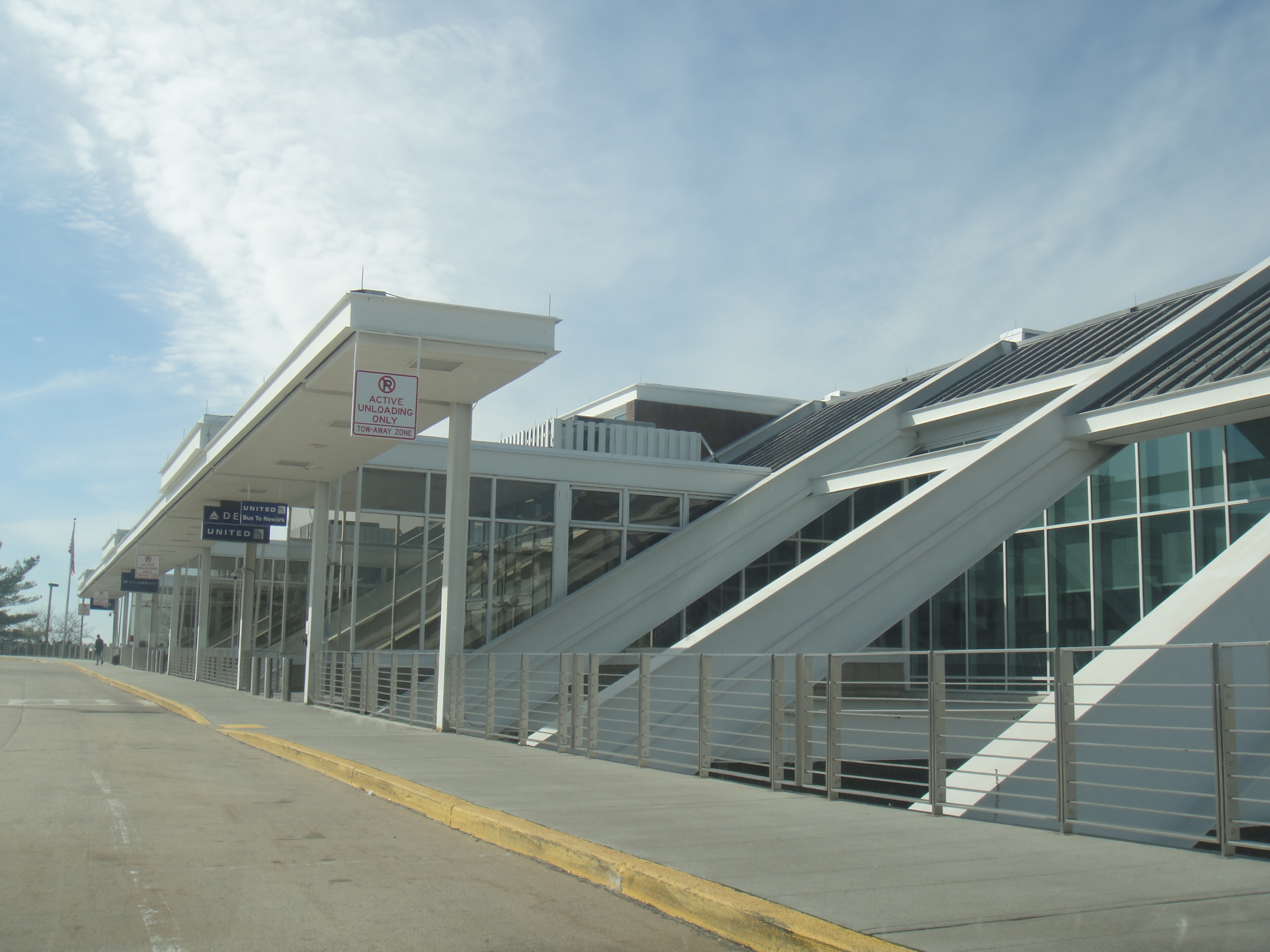
Lehigh Valley International Airport, Pennsylvania's fourth-busiest airport, in Hanover Township in Lehigh County

Lehigh County's primary commercial airport is Lehigh Valley International Airport (IATA: ABE, ICAO: KABE), located in Hanover Township in the county. The county is also served by Allentown Queen City Municipal Airport, a two-runway general aviation facility located off Lehigh Street in Allentown used predominantly by private aviation.

=== Bus ===
Public bus service in Lehigh County is available through LANta. Several private bus lines, including Trans-Bridge Lines, provide bus service from Allentown to New York City's Port Authority Bus Terminal, Philadelphia's Greyhound Terminal and 30th Street Station, Atlantic City's Bus Terminal, and other regional locations.

=== Major highways ===
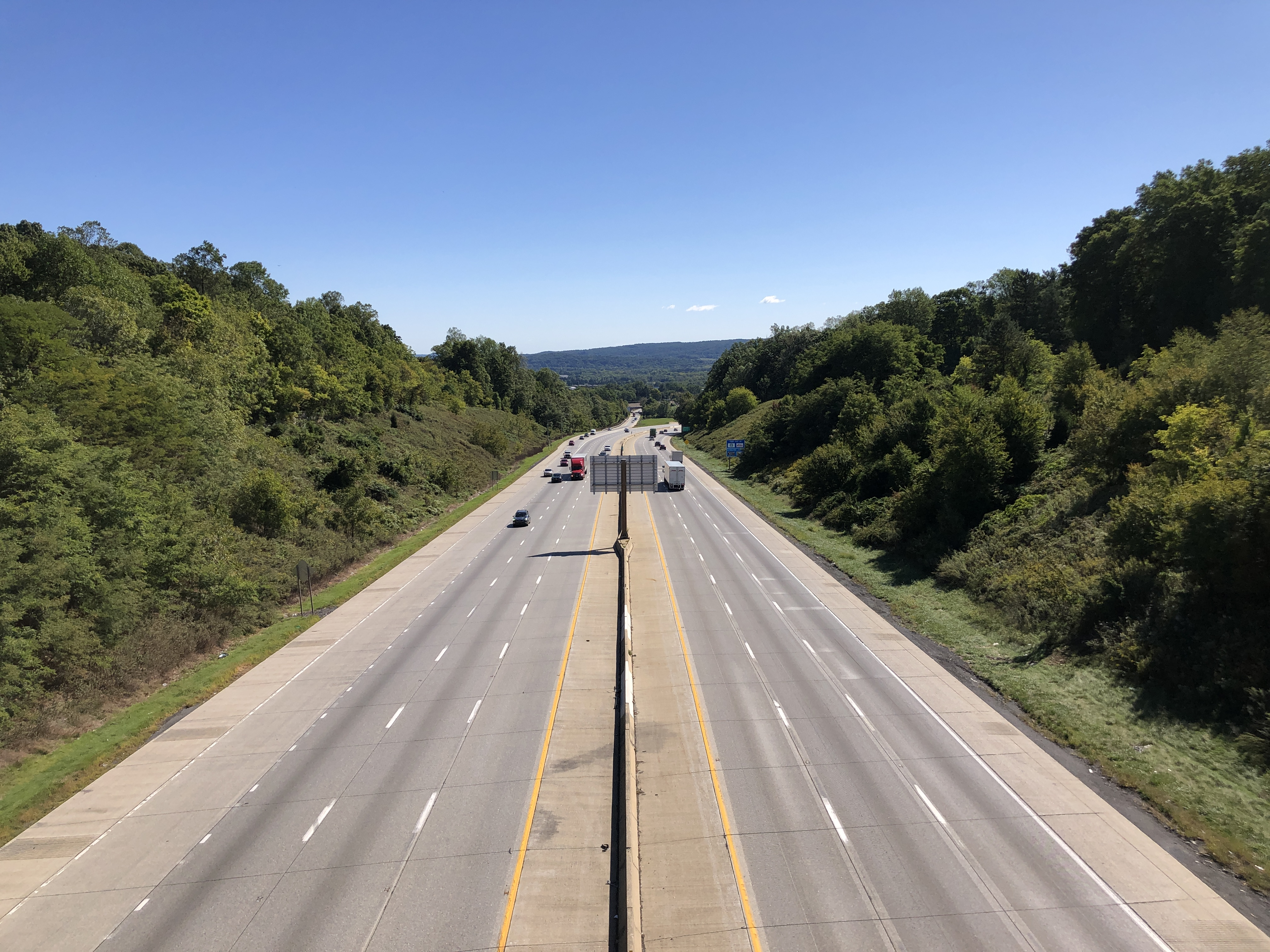
The merger of I-78 East and PA Route 309 South in Lehigh County in September 2022

- I-78
- I-476 / Penna Turnpike NE Extension
- US 22
- US 222
- PA 29
- PA 100
- PA 143
- PA 145
- PA 222
- PA 309
- PA 329
- PA 378
- PA 863
- PA 873
- PA 987
- Cedar Crest Boulevard
- Lehigh Street
- Tilghman Street

== Media ==
=== Newspapers ===
The Morning Call (in Allentown), The Express-Times (in Easton), and The Times News (in Lehighton) each cover Lehigh County.

=== Radio ===
Lehigh County-area radio stations include WAEB-AM in Allentown (talk and news), B104 in Allentown (contemporary hits), WZZO in Bethlehem (classic rock), WHOL in Allentown (rhythmic contemporary), and others. Some major New York City stations and every major Philadelphia station are received in the county.

=== Television ===
Lehigh County is part of the Philadelphia broadcast media market, the nation's fourth-largest media market. Numerous New York City radio and television stations are also carried in the county. Three television stations are based in the county, WBPH-TV Channel 60, WLVT Channel 39 (the Lehigh Valley's PBS affiliate), and WFMZ Channel 69 (an independent television station).

The four major Philadelphia-based network stations serving Lehigh County are KYW-TV (the CBS affiliate), WCAU (the NBC affiliate), WPVI (the ABC affiliate), and WTXF (the Fox affiliate). The four major New York City-based network stations serving Lehigh County are WABC (the ABC affiliate), WCBS-TV (the CBS affiliate), WNBC (the NBC affiliate), and WNYW (the Fox affiliate). The four major Scranton-Wilkes-Barre-based network stations serving Lehigh County are WNEP-TV (the ABC affiliate), WBRE-TV (the NBC affiliate), WYOU (the CBS affiliate), and WOLF-TV (the Fox affiliate).

=== Telecommunications ===
From 1947 until 1994, Lehigh County was served exclusively by the 215 area code. With the county's growing population, area code 610 was also allocated to the county in 1994. Today, Lehigh County is covered largely by the 610 area code. An overlay area code, 484, was added to the 610 service area in 1999. A plan to introduce area code 835 as an additional overlay was rescinded in 2001. It has since been reintroduced and will begin use once 610 and 484 extensions are exhausted, possibly as early as September 2022.

== Recreation ==
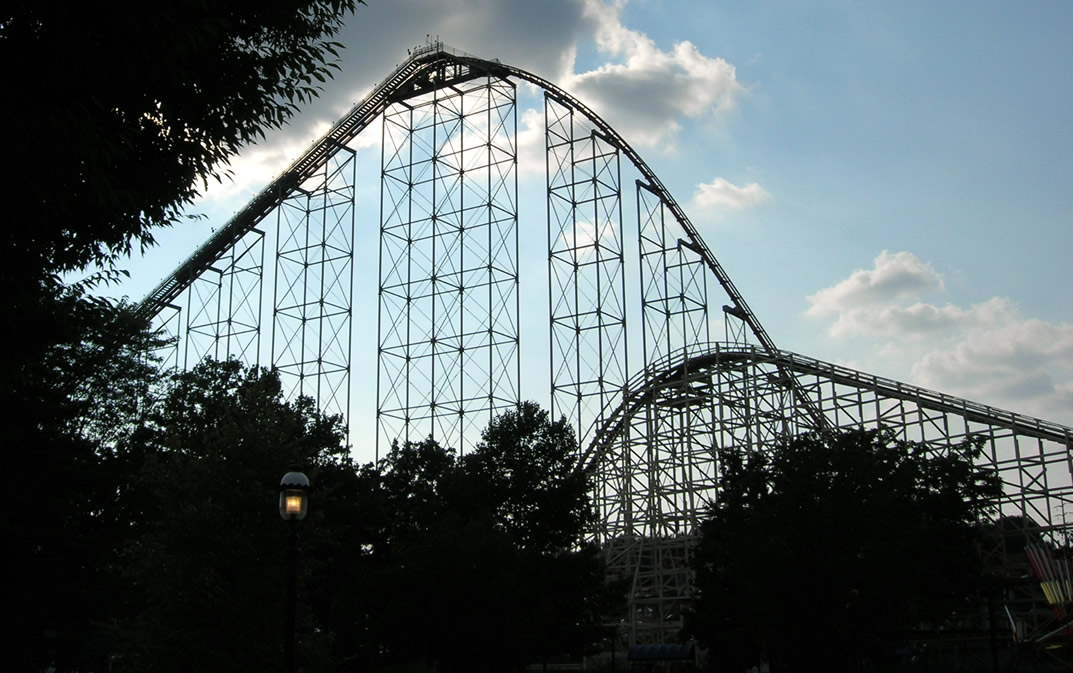
Dorney Park & Wildwater Kingdom's Steel Force and Thunderhawk roller coasters in Allentown; Steel Force is the eighth-tallest steel roller coaster in the world with a first drop of 205 feet (62 m) and a top speed of 75 miles per hour (121 km/h).

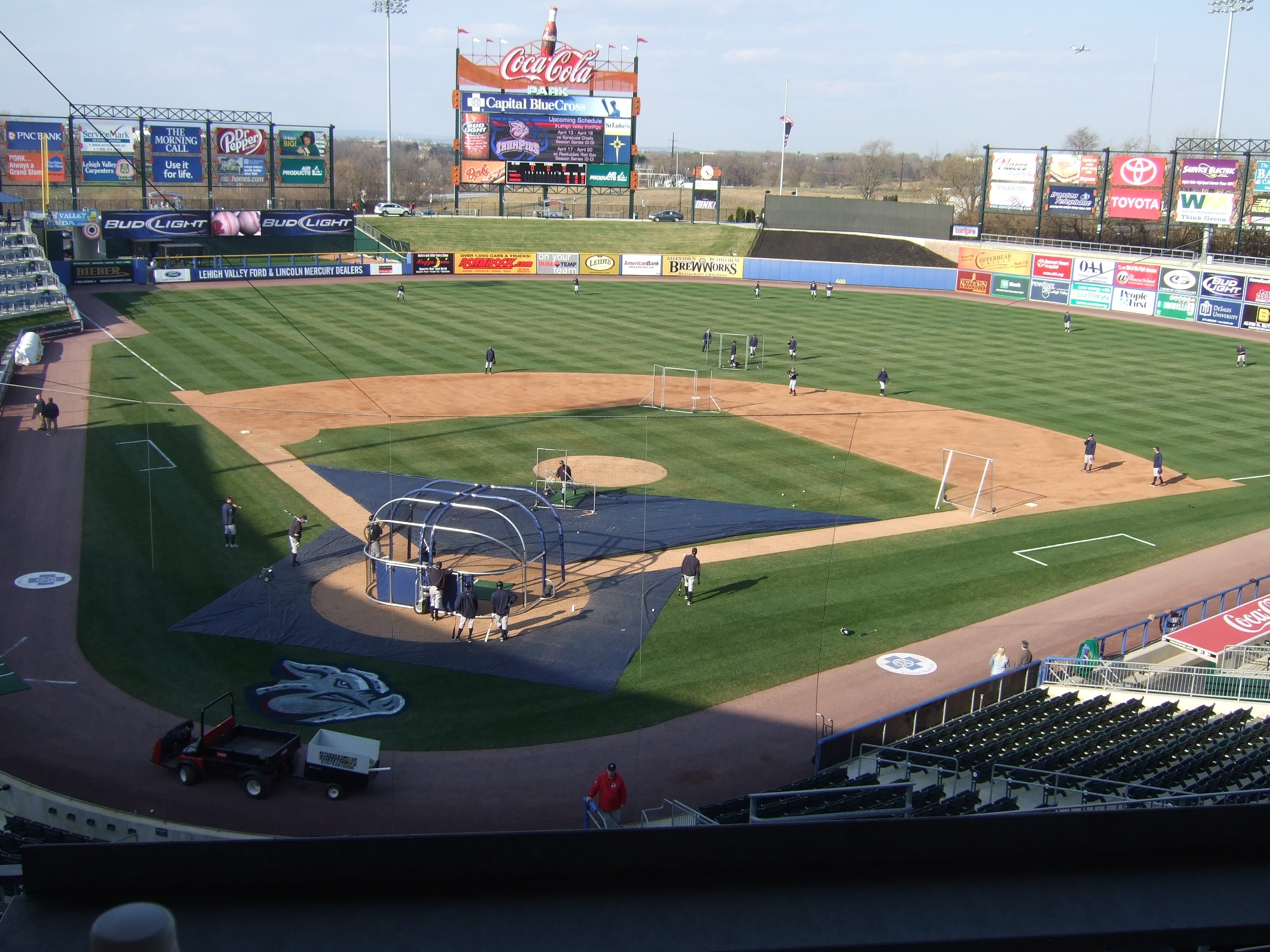
Coca-Cola Park in Allentown, home of the Lehigh Valley IronPigs, the Triple-A affiliate of the Philadelphia Phillies

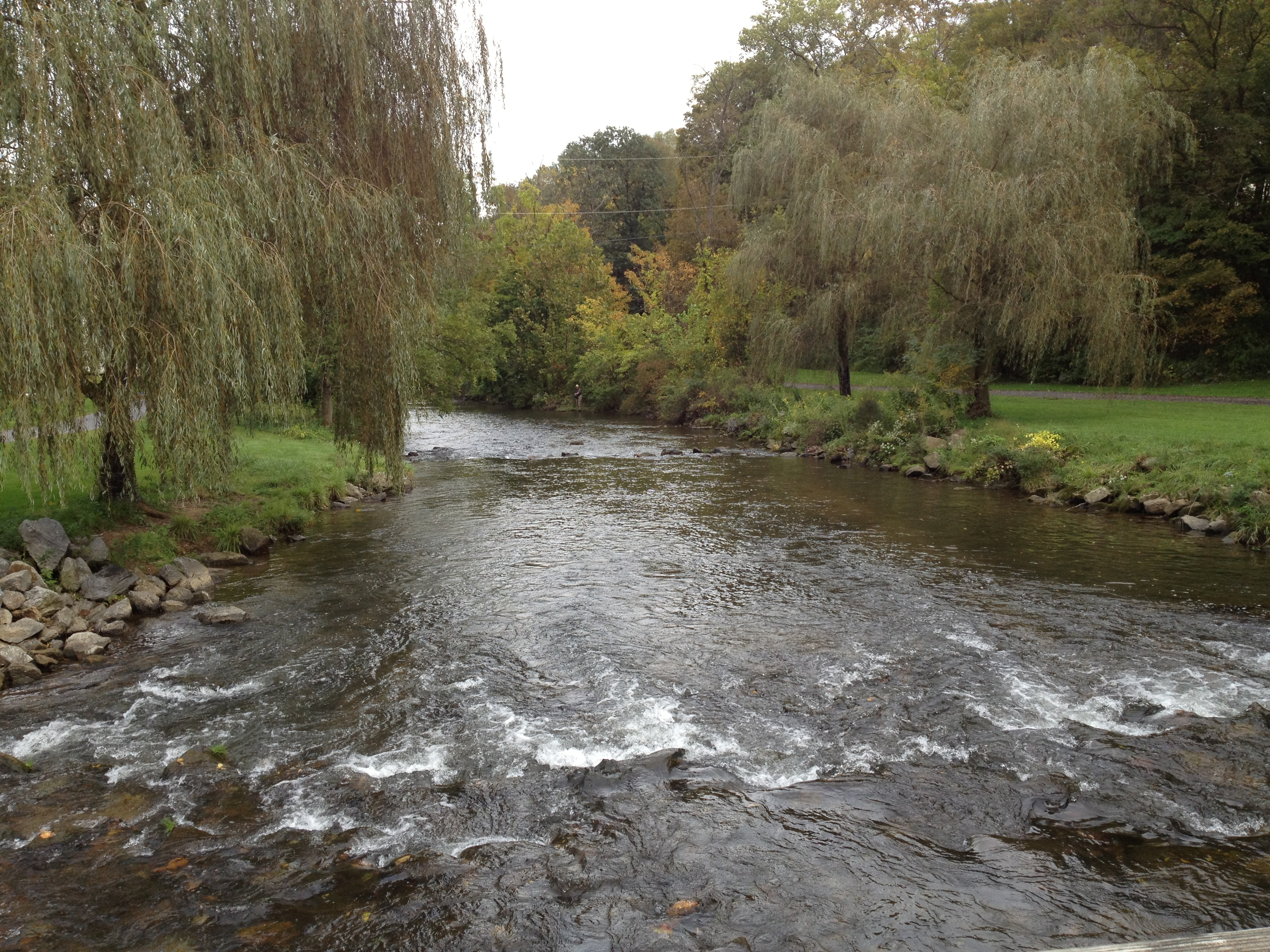
Little Lehigh Creek in Allentown's Lehigh Parkway in September 2012

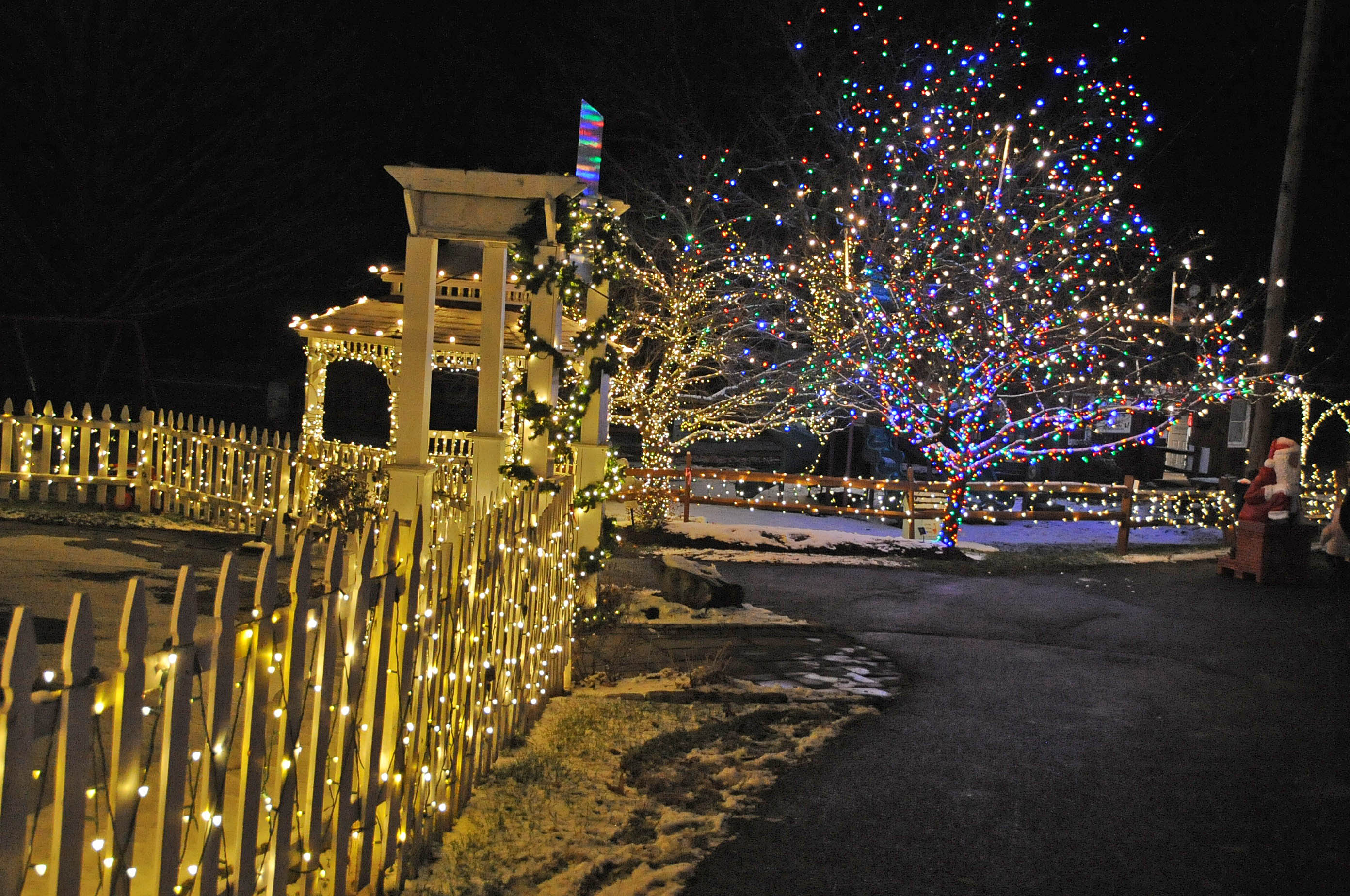
Christmas lights at Lehigh Valley Zoo in Schnecksville in December 2020

=== Amusement parks ===
Dorney Park & Wildwater Kingdom, one of the largest amusement and water parks on the U.S. East Coast, is located in South Whitehall Township in the county. It is open May through the end of October.

=== Fairs and festivals ===
The Great Allentown Fair, one of the nation's largest and longest ongoing city fairs, is held annually at Allentown Fairgrounds on North 17th Street in Allentown the end of August and beginning of September. Mayfair Festival of the Arts, an arts and festival fair, is held annually in May on the campus of Cedar Crest College in Allentown.

=== Golf ===
Lehigh County is home to multiple golf courses, including Brookside Country Club in Macungie, Lehigh Country Club on Cedar Crest Boulevard in Allentown, Olde Homestead Golf Club in New Tripoli, Saucon Valley Country Club in Upper Saucon Township, Shepherd Hills Golf Club in Wescosville, and Wedgewood Golf Course in Coopersburg.

=== Museums and history ===
The county has several museums, including Allentown Art Museum, America on Wheels, Da Vinci Science Center, George Taylor House, Lehigh County Historical Society at Trout Hall, Museum of Indian Culture, The 1803 House, and others.

=== Parks and zoo ===
Lehigh County also has 25 acres (100,000 m^{2}) of public parks, including:

- Lehigh Parkway in Allentown, is a 999 acres (4.04 km^{2}) city-owned park along Little Lehigh Creek.
- Lock Ridge Park in Alburtis, is a 59.2 acres (0.240 km^{2}) county-owned park along Swabia Creek that includes the Lock Ridge Furnace Museum.
- Trexler Nature Preserve in North Whitehall Township, is a 1,108 acres (4.48 km^{2}) county-owned park along Jordan Creek, which includes the Lehigh Valley Zoo.
- Whitehall Parkway in Whitehall Township, is a 110 acres (0.45 km^{2}) township-owned park connected to the 9 miles (14 km) Ironton Rail Trail.

== Communities ==
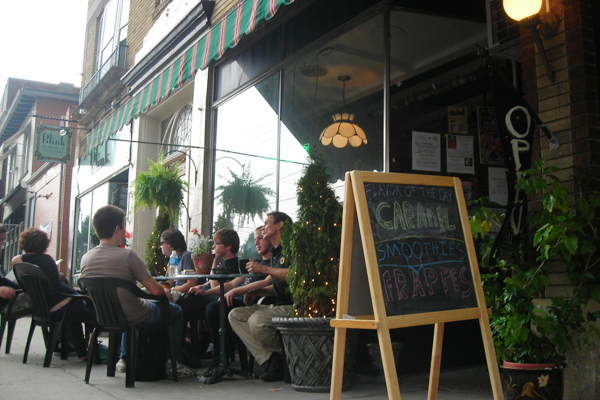
Young people gather on 19th Street in Allentown's West End in July 2007

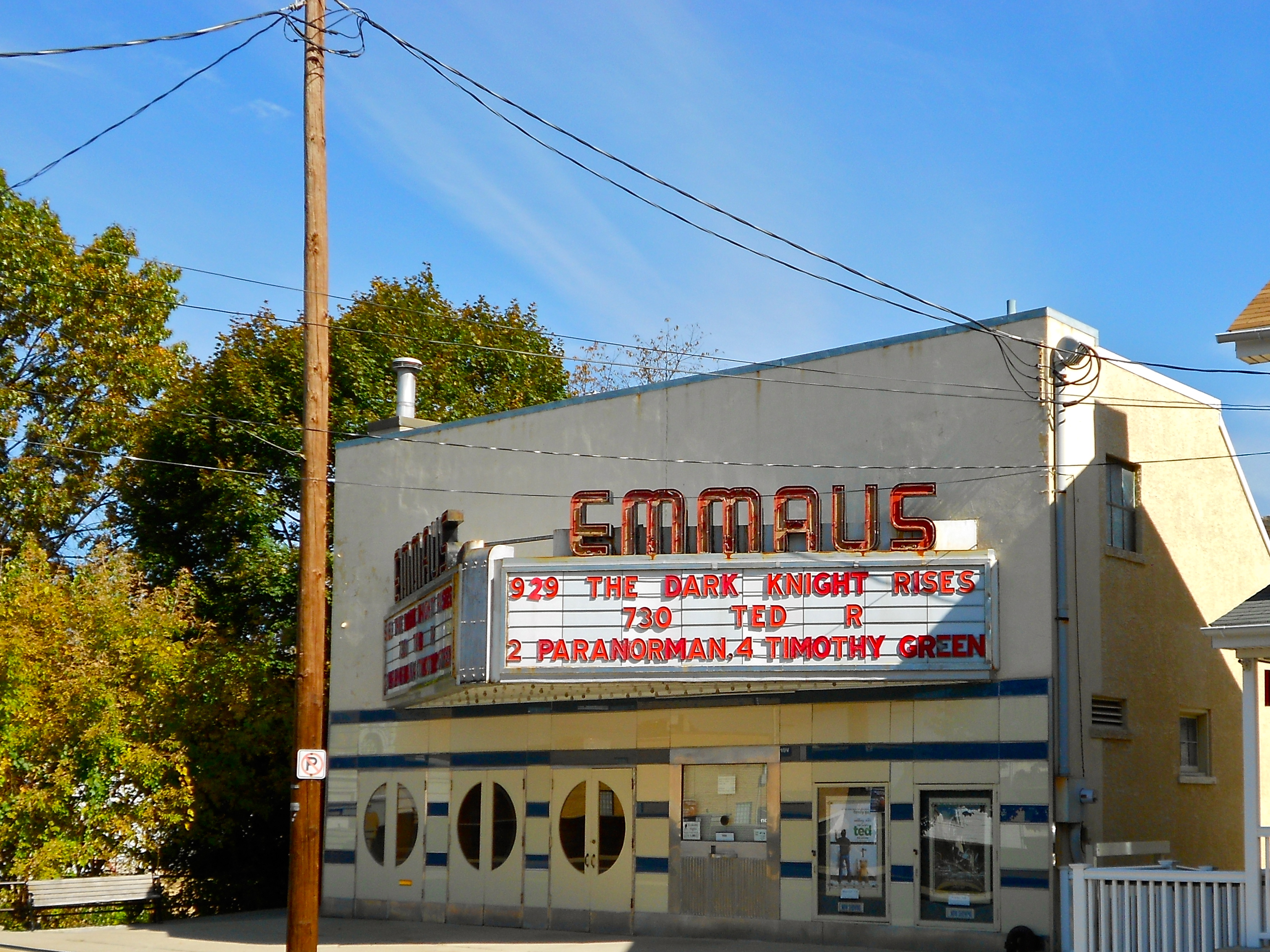
The historic Emmaus Theatre on South Fourth Street in Emmaus in October 2012

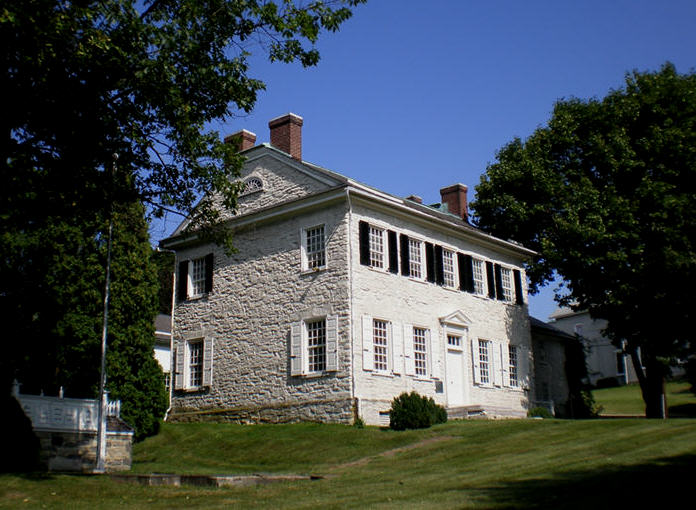
The George Taylor House in Catasauqua, the former home of George Taylor, a Founding Father of the United States who signed the Declaration of Independence

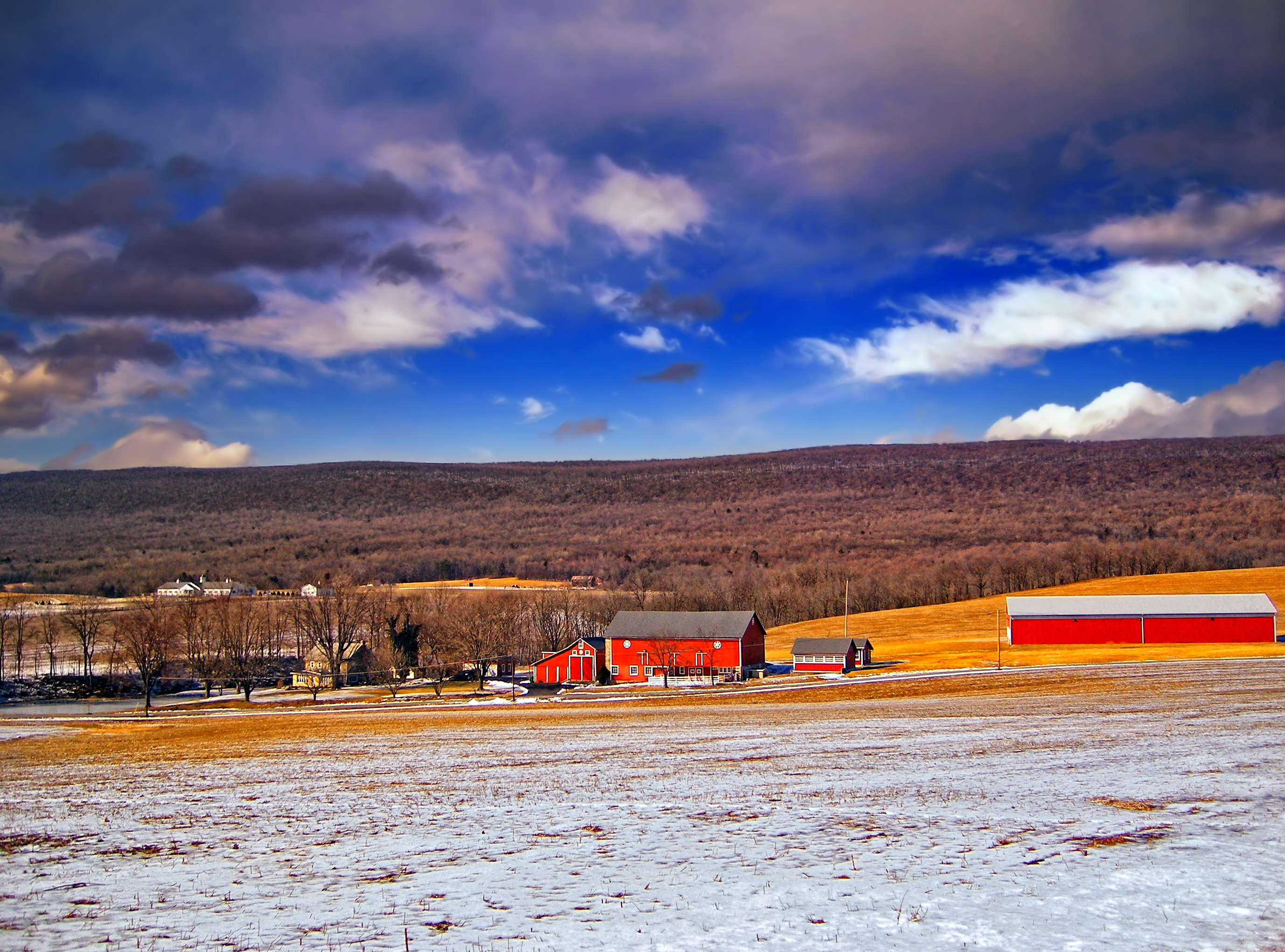
A farm in Lynn Township in the northwest corner of Lehigh County in February 2008

Under Pennsylvania law, there are four types of incorporated municipalities: cities, boroughs, townships, and, in only one case, towns. The following cities, boroughs, and townships are located in Lehigh County:

=== Cities ===
- Allentown (county seat)
- Bethlehem (mostly in Northampton County)

=== Boroughs ===
- Alburtis
- Catasauqua
- Coopersburg
- Coplay
- Emmaus
- Fountain Hill
- Macungie
- Slatington

=== Townships ===
- Hanover Township
- Heidelberg Township
- Lower Macungie Township
- Lower Milford Township
- Lowhill Township
- Lynn Township
- North Whitehall Township
- Salisbury Township
- South Whitehall Township
- Upper Macungie Township
- Upper Milford Township
- Upper Saucon Township
- Washington Township
- Weisenberg Township
- Whitehall Township

=== Census-designated places ===
Census-designated places are geographical areas designated by the U.S. Census Bureau for the purposes of compiling demographic data. They are not actual jurisdictions under Pennsylvania law. Other unincorporated communities, such as villages, may be listed here as well.

- Ancient Oaks
- Breinigsville
- Cementon
- Cetronia
- DeSales University
- Dorneyville
- Egypt
- Fullerton
- Hokendauqua
- Laurys Station
- New Tripoli
- Schnecksville
- Slatedale
- Stiles
- Trexlertown
- Wescosville

=== Unincorporated communities ===
- Balliettsville
- Best Station
- Center Valley
- Colesville
- Eagle Point
- East Texas
- Emerald
- Fogelsville
- Friedensville
- Gauff Hill
- Germansville
- Hensingersville
- Hosensack
- Ironton
- Jacksonville
- Kuhnsville
- Lanark
- Limeport
- Locust Valley
- Lynnport
- Mickleys
- Neffs
- New Smithville
- Old Zionsville
- Orefield
- Pleasant Corners
- Powder Valley
- Scherersville
- Schoenersville
- Shimerville
- Sigmund
- Summit Lawn
- Vera Cruz
- Walbert
- Wanamakers
- Werleys Corner
- West Catasauqua
- Zionsville

=== Population ranking ===
Lehigh County's largest cities, townships, boroughs, and other communities, based on the 2020 census, include:

† county seat

Rank	City/Town/etc.	Municipal type	Population (2020 Census)
1	† Allentown	City	125,845
2	Bethlehem (mostly in Northampton County)	City	74,982
4	Emmaus	Borough	11,652
5	Ancient Oaks	CDP	6,995
6	Catasauqua	Borough	6,518
7	Wescosville	CDP	6,039
8	Fountain Hill	Borough	4,878
9	Dorneyville	CDP	4,406
10	Slatington	Borough	4,232
11	Breinigsville	CDP	4,138
13	Coplay	Borough	3,192
14	Macungie	Borough	3,074
15	Schnecksville	CDP	2,935
17	Coopersburg	Borough	2,386
18	Alburtis	Borough	2,361
19	Cetronia	CDP	2,115
20	Trexlertown	CDP	1,988
22	Laurys Station	CDP	1,243
24	DeSales University	CDP	953
25	New Tripoli	CDP	898
26	Slatedale	CDP	455

== Notable people ==
Since its founding in 1812, Lehigh County has been the birthplace or home to several notable Americans, including:

- Chuck Bednarik, former professional football player, Philadelphia Eagles, and 1967 Pro Football Hall of Fame inductee
- Stephen Vincent Benét, former novelist
- Michaela Conlin, stage and television actress, Bones
- Todd Howard, video game designer, director, and executive producer of Bethesda Softworks
- Lee Iacocca, former president and chief executive officer of Chrysler
- Keith Jarrett, jazz musician
- Michael Johns, healthcare executive and former White House presidential speechwriter
- Billy Kidman, former professional wrestler
- Carson Kressley, Emmy-winning fashion designer, Bravo's Queer Eye
- Rose Lambert, former American missionary who witnessed the 1909 Adana massacre of Armenians
- Varvara Lepchenko, professional tennis player
- Lil Peep, former American emo rapper, singer, and songwriter
- Matt Millen, former professional football player, Oakland Raiders, San Francisco 49ers, and Washington Redskins, and former president and general manager, Detroit Lions
- Andre Reed, former professional football player, Buffalo Bills and Washington Redskins, and 2014 Pro Football Hall of Fame inductee
- John O. Sheatz, former Pennsylvania state representative, state senator, and state treasurer from 1908 to 1911
- Amanda Seyfried, actress, Veronica Mars, Big Love, Mamma Mia!, and Les Misérables
- Curt Simmons, former professional baseball player, California Angels, Chicago Cubs, Philadelphia Phillies, and St. Louis Cardinals
- Eric Steckel, blues singer, guitarist, songwriter, and record producer
- Dana Snyder, film and television actor, Aqua Teen Hunger Force
- Christine Taylor, actress and wife of actor Ben Stiller
- Lauren Weisberger, author, The Devil Wears Prada
