= The 1803 House =

Historic house in Pennsylvania, United States

- U.S. National Register of Historic Places
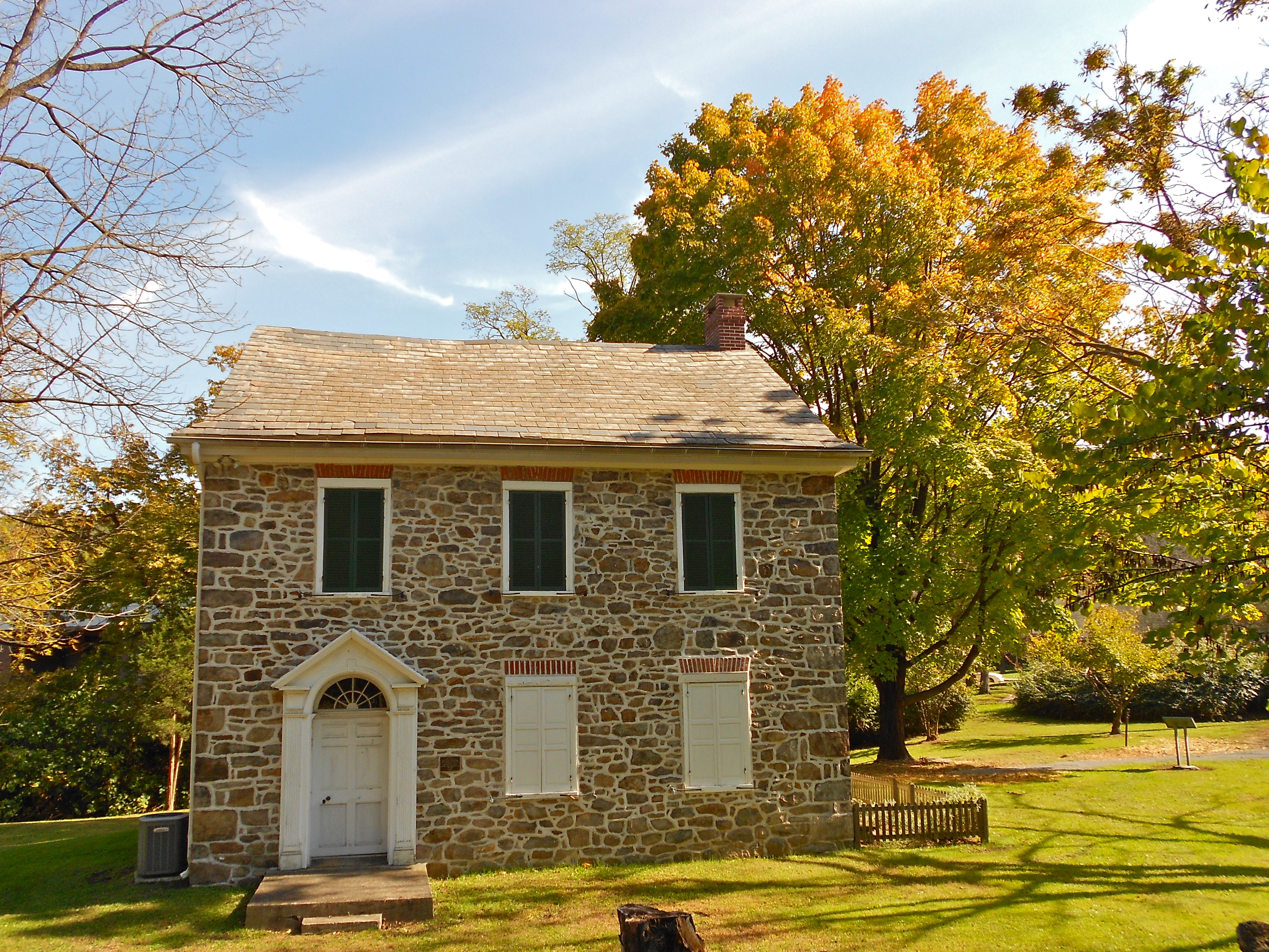
- The 1803 House in Emmaus, Pennsylvania, October 2012

- Location within Pennsylvania Location within the United States
- Interactive map showing the location of The 1803 House
- Location: 55 S. Keystone Ave., Emmaus, Pennsylvania, U.S.
- Coordinates: 40°32′23″N 75°29′11″W
- Area: Less than one acre
- Built: 1803
- Architect: Jacob Ehrenhardt, Jr.
- Architectural style: Federal
- NRHP reference No.: 03001123
- Added to NRHP: November 7, 2003

The 1803 House, also known as the Jacob Ehrenhardt Jr. House, is a historic home in Emmaus, Pennsylvania, United States. It was built in 1803 for Jacob Ehrenhardt Jr., a son of one of the town's founders.

In 2003, in recognition of its historic significance, it was added to the National Register of Historic Places.

== History ==
Built in 1803, the house is a 2 1/2-story, fieldstone house with a Federal side-hall plan. It was built for Jacob Ehrenhardt Jr. whose father, Jacob Ehrenhardt Sr., had been one of the founders of the town of Emmaus as a settlement of the Moravian Church in 1747. The home's original owner, Jacob Ehrenhardt Jr., was a member of the Northampton County militia in 1782, and served in the American Revolutionary War. Expelled from the Moravian Church for serving in the military, he was later reaccepted into the church and supported himself as a shoemaker, farmer, and tavern-keeper.

This historic house has a 1 1/2-story, rear kitchen wing, and a slate-covered roof. Occupied into the 1950s, it was restored in the 1980s. It is open as a historic house museum. It had been changed so that the toilet was near the old living room. A Rodale-funded restoration put furniture back in its original place.

== Present day usage ==
The house is open for tours by appointment by the Friends of 1803 House.
