= Shimerville, Pennsylvania =

Unincorporated community in Pennsylvania, U.S.

Coordinates: 40.4943°N 75.5268°W

Shimerville is an unincorporated community, located on Pennsylvania Route 100 and Pennsylvania Route 29 South in Upper Milford Township in Lehigh County, Pennsylvania. The community is located south of Macungie and west of Vera Cruz. It is part of the Lehigh Valley, which has a population of 861,899 and is the 68th-most populous metropolitan area in the U.S. as of the 2020 census.

Shimerville is served by the Emmaus post office, with the ZIP Code of 18049. A prominent business in the village is the Shimerville Center, with its firearm range and catered events building.

== History ==
In 1733, John, Thomas, and Richard Penn Sr. sold 352 acres of land on the branch of the Perkiomen Creek to Dirick Johnson. In 1774, Dirick's son, John Johnson, sold 213 acres of that land to Jacob Miller, an Inn Keeper in Upper Milford Township. In 1792, John Shimer purchased from Jacob Miller over 250 acres of land, the premises on which the present village of Shimerville is located.

By 1795, John Shimer had become a successful farmer, landlord, and justice of the peace for Upper Milford Township.

== Education ==
Shimerville is served by the East Penn School District. Emmaus High School in Emmaus serves grades nine through 12. Eyer Middle School and Lower Macungie Middle School, both located in Macungie, serve grades six through eight.
