= Old Zionsville, Pennsylvania =

Unincorporated community in Pennsylvania, US

- Unincorporated community
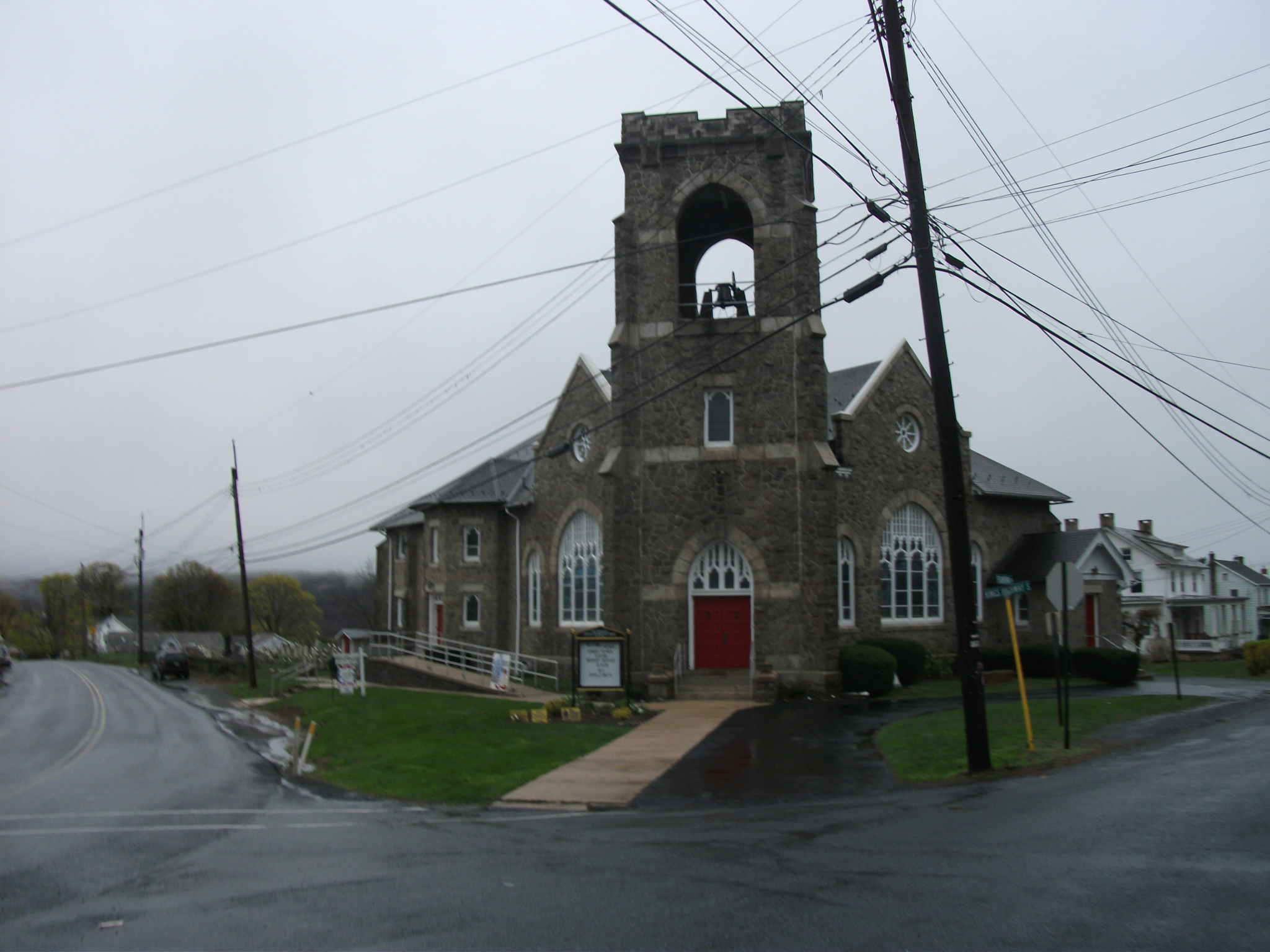
- A church in Old Zionsville in April 2011

- Location within Pennsylvania Location within the United States
- Coordinates: 40°29′11″N 75°31′13″W
- Country: United States
- State: Pennsylvania
- County: Lehigh
- Township: Upper Milford
- Elevation: 778 ft (237 m)

Population
  - Metro: 865,310 (US: 68th)
- Time zone: UTC-5 (Eastern (EST))
  - Summer (DST): UTC-4 (EDT)
- ZIP Code: 18068
- Area codes: 610 and 484
- GNIS feature ID: 1182959
- Primary airport: Lehigh Valley International Airport
- Major hospital: Lehigh Valley Hospital–Cedar Crest
- School district: East Penn

Old Zionsville is an unincorporated community in Upper Milford Township in Lehigh County, Pennsylvania. It is part of the Lehigh Valley, which has a population of 861,899 and is the 68th-most populous metropolitan area in the U.S. as of the 2020 census.

Old Zionsville is located along Pennsylvania State Routes 29 and 100, 2.5 miles (4.0 km) southeast of Macungie. Old Zionsville has a box post office with ZIP Code 18068. Surrounding areas use the Zionsville ZIP code of 18092 or the Emmaus ZIP Code of 18049.

The Upper Milford Township municipal building is located at 5671 Chestnut Street at the former site of Kings Highway Elementary School and has a Saturday farmers' market. There are two churches of the Lutheran and UCC faiths in the village and two more of the Mennonite and Bible Fellowship faiths within a mile to the east near Zionsville. Old Zionsville straddles the divide between the Lehigh and Schuylkill River watersheds. While most of the village is drained via headwaters of Perkiomen Creek to the Schuylkill River, the northern tier including the municipal building is drained via Leibert Creek and Little Lehigh Creek to the Lehigh River. The watershed divide runs east-to-west just north of Ridgeway Drive and Walnut Lane.

== Education ==
Old Zionsville is served by the East Penn School District. Emmaus High School in Emmaus serves grades nine through 12. Eyer Middle School and Lower Macungie Middle School, both located in Macungie, serve grades six through eight.
