= Sigmund, Pennsylvania =

Unincorporated community in Pennsylvania, US

- Unincorporated community
- Location of Sigmund in Pennsylvania Sigmund, Pennsylvania (the United States)
- Coordinates: 40.473°N 75.559°W
- Country: United States
- State: Pennsylvania
- County: Lehigh
- Township: Upper Milford
- Elevation: 650 ft (200 m)

Population
  - Metro: 865,310 (US: 68th)
- Time zone: UTC-5 (Eastern (EST))
  - Summer (DST): UTC-4 (EDT)
- ZIP Code: 18092 and 18062
- Area code: 610
- GNIS feature ID: 1204651
- Primary airport: Lehigh Valley International Airport
- Major hospital: Lehigh Valley Hospital–Cedar Crest
- School district: East Penn

Sigmund is an unincorporated community in Upper Milford Township in Lehigh County, Pennsylvania. Sigmund is located near Perkiomen Creek, a tributary of the Schuylkill River. It is a suburb of Allentown in the Lehigh Valley, which has a population of 861,899 and is the 68th-most populous metropolitan area in the U.S. as of the 2020 census.

== History ==
=== 19th century ===
A furnace was located in Sigmund in the early 1800s. The community was first named Hampton, and then Mary Ann, and then Sigmund Furnace prior to settling on Sigmund as its name.

A settlement formed around a store in 1872. That same year, a post office called "Sigmund" was established. A school was erected in 1877, and a creamery and home were built in 1886.

A meeting of the Hereford Literary Society in 1896 noted that "many new members had come in from Harlem, Sigmund and vicinity". A stone house at the camp from 1871 was previously Sigmund's post office, general store, and hotel.

=== 20th century ===
Sigmund Bible Camp opened in 1956 on 73 acres (30 ha) of land. The site contains a coal storage building, built prior to 1850, that provided fuel to a nearby iron furnace. It is now used as a church. Two quarries and three lime kilns are also located on camp property. A gym at the camp is open to the community, and is used by the Upper Milford Youth Association.

== Education ==
Sigmund is served by East Penn School District. Emmaus High School serves grades nine through twelve. Eyer Middle School and Lower Macungie Middle School, both located in Macungie, serve grades six through eight.
