= Vera Cruz, Pennsylvania =

Unincorporated community in Pennsylvania, US

Coordinates: 40.5053°N 75.4967°W

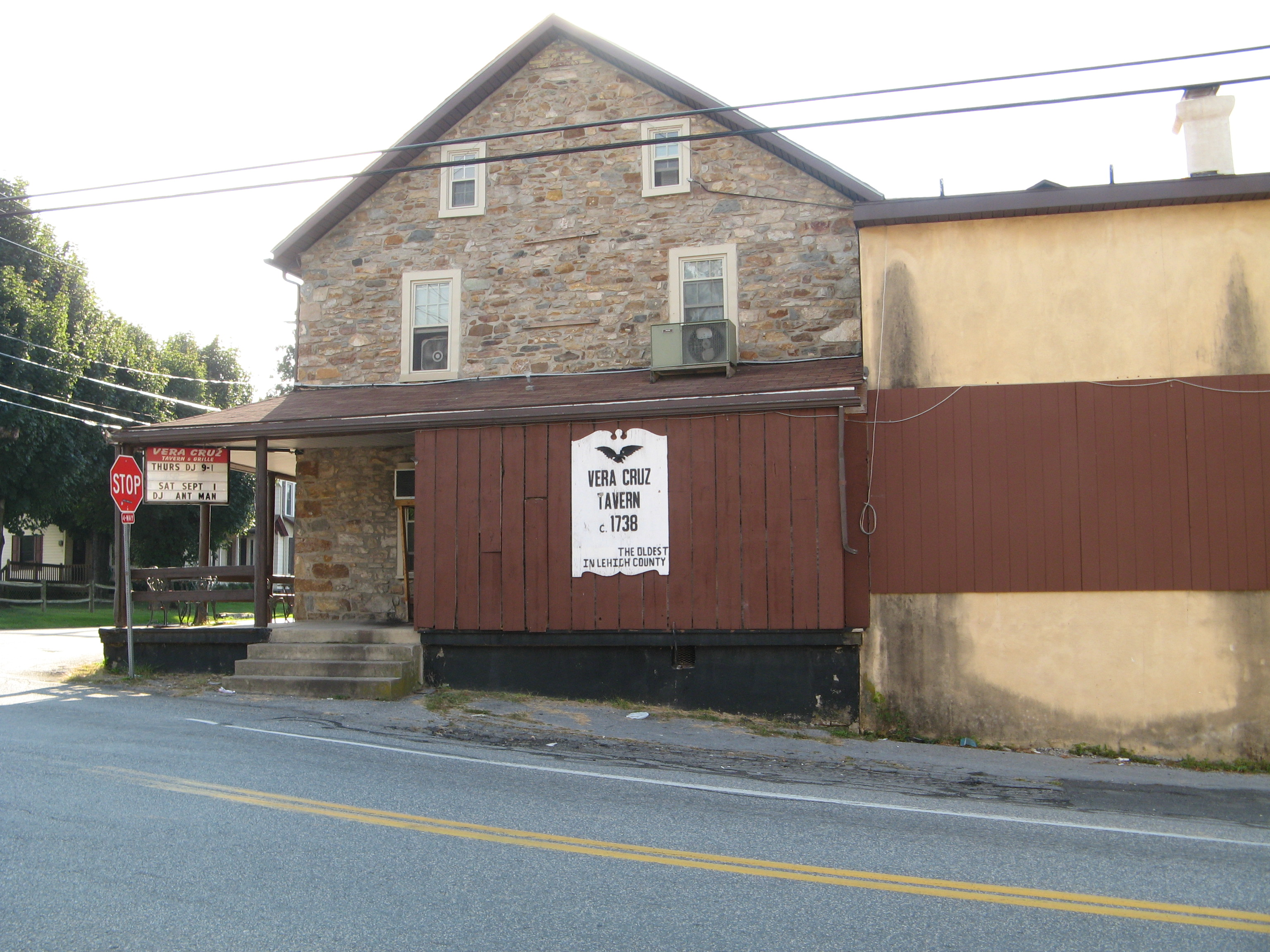
Vera Cruz Tavern in September 2007

Vera Cruz is a small village in Upper Milford Township, Pennsylvania located south of Emmaus. It is part of the Lehigh Valley, which has a population of 861,899 and is the 68th-most populous metropolitan area in the U.S. as of the 2020 census.

Vera Cruz uses the Emmaus Zip Code of 18049.

== History ==
=== Jasper mines ===
Prior to its settlement, the area that is present-day Vera Cruz was inhabited by the Lenape Indian tribes. Vera Cruz was the location of the earliest jasper mines on the North American continent, dating back to 8000 BC. At the height of Lenape Indian jasper mining activities, more than 100 small jasper pits were operated in the area of Vera Cruz, primarily in what is now Jasper Park. The quarries were eventually abandoned in the 1680s.

The jasper mines of Vera Cruz supported tool production for the Lenape in the area, including arrowheads and other small tools used in both hunting and battle. The jasper from Jasper Park has since been found as far away as New England, supporting claims that the Vera Cruz area played a key role in supporting early jasper production and trade. The Jasper Park jasper pits are part of a key 35-mile long stretch of nine pits in the Vera Cruz area, stretching from the Delaware River to Fleetwood, Pennsylvania.

These jasper pits in Vera Cruz represent some of the oldest known mining operations in the United States. Today, the jasper pits in Jasper Park are a local attraction, which support small hiking and biking trails. Removal of jasper from Jasper park is a crime.

Prior to 1851, Vera Cruz was an unnamed village at a prominent crossroad, located in what was then Milford Township, Pennsylvania. While a group of regular loungers were sitting at what was previously Alexander Weaver's store, their eyes turned to a newspaper with the title of "Revolt in Vera Cruz (Mexico): 12 Killed, 20 Injured," which led to their conversation turning to the topic of Mexico. After a sound of angry voices outside, the loungers rushed outside to see the commotion and saw two citizens engaged in a fight. Alexander Weaver jokingly remarked, "Now we have a name for our village. Why not call it Vera Cruz?" Ever since that incident, the name Vera Cruz has remained.

== Geography ==
Vera Cruz is located on the Leibert Creek, a tributary of Little Lehigh Creek, which is located to its north. The ridge to the south separates it from the Schuylkill River watershed. Geographically, Vera Cruz is part of the Reading Prong province of the Appalachian Mountains.

== Transportation ==
Interstate 476, also known as the Northeast Extension of the Pennsylvania Turnpike or the Blue Route, passes through Vera Cruz about midway between the Northeast Extension's Lehigh Valley and Quakertown exits.

The Perkiomen Branch commercial train line routes through Vera Cruz. Dillinger Tunnel in Emmaus carries the rail line under the divide between Vera Cruz and the Dillinger Tunnel.

== Education ==
Vera Cruz is part of the East Penn School District. Students in grades nine through 12 attend Emmaus High School in Emmaus. Students in grades six through eight attend either Eyer Middle School or Lower Macungie Middle School, both located in Macungie.
