= Upper Milford Township, Pennsylvania =

Township in Pennsylvania, US

Upper Milford Township
- Township
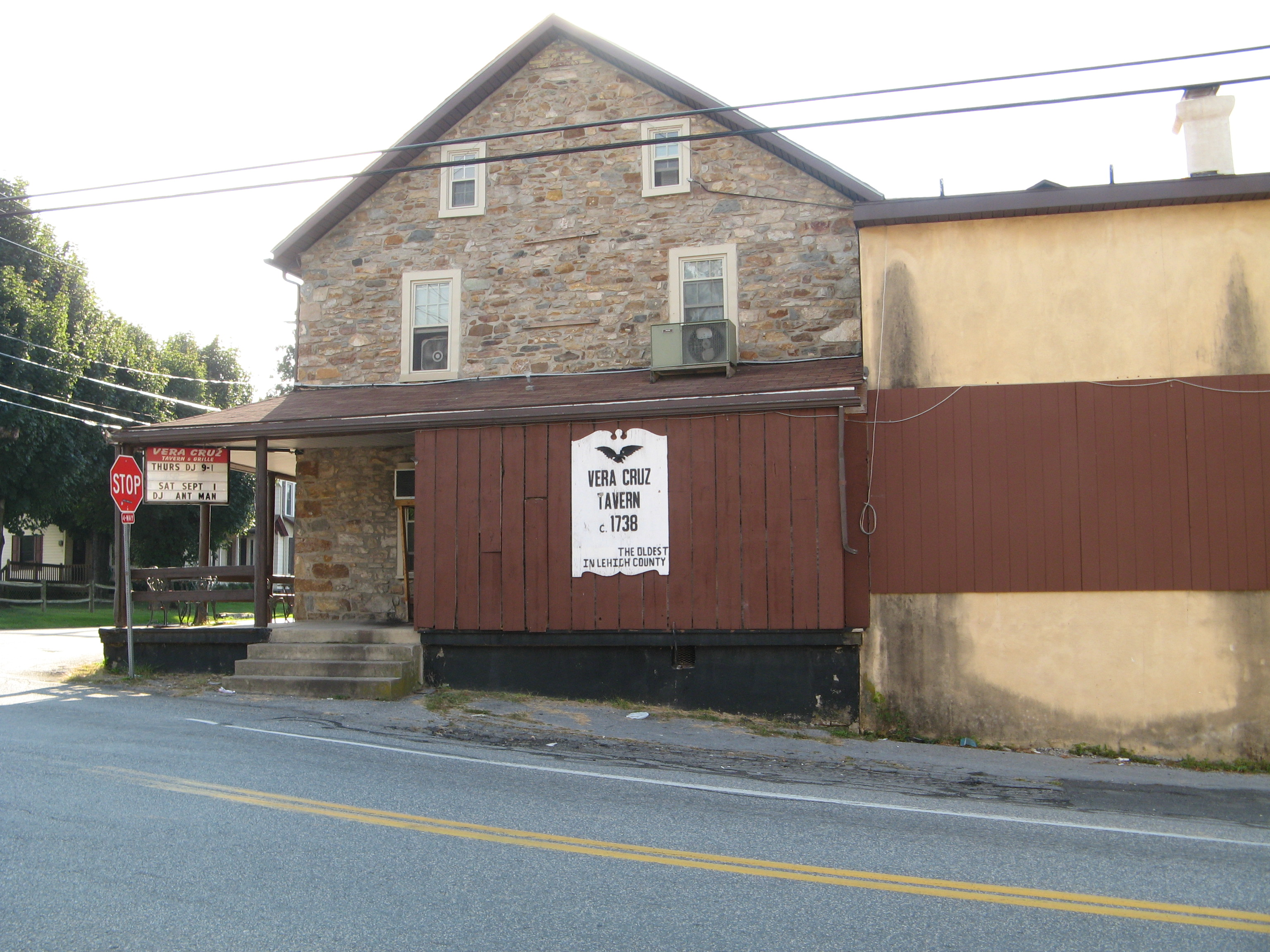
- Vera Cruz Tavern, built in 1738, in Upper Milford Township

- Seal

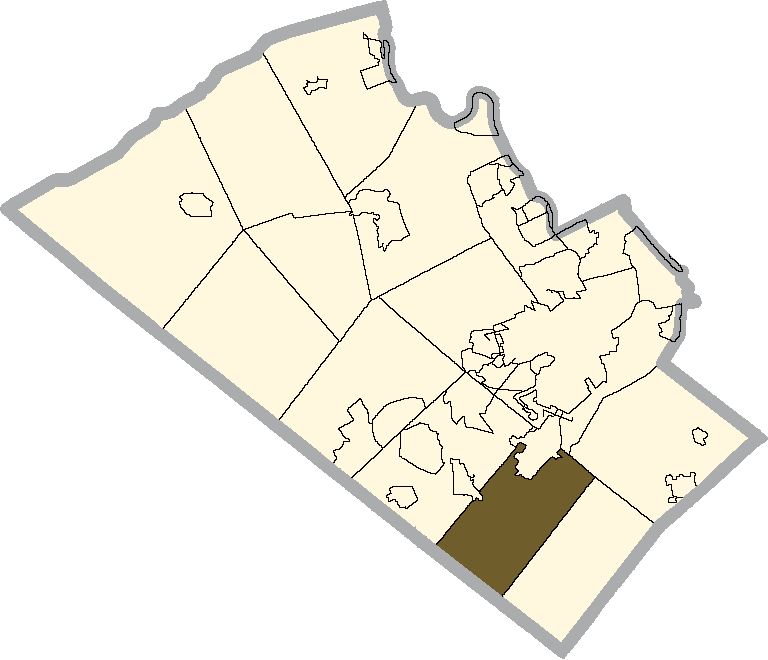
- Location of Upper Milford Township in Lehigh County, Pennsylvania

- Location of Upper Milford Township in Pennsylvania Location in the United States
- Coordinates: 40°31′00″N 75°28′59″W
- Country: United States
- State: Pennsylvania
- County: Lehigh

Area
  - Township: 18.01 sq mi (46.64 km^{2})
  - Land: 17.95 sq mi (46.50 km^{2})
  - Water: 0.054 sq mi (0.14 km^{2})
- Elevation: 876 ft (267 m)

Population (2010)
  - Township: 7,292
  - Estimate (2016): 7,614
  - Density: 424.1/sq mi (163.73/km^{2})
  - Metro: 865,310 (US: 68th)
- Time zone: UTC-5 (EST)
  - Summer (DST): UTC-4 (EDT)
- ZIP codes: 18049, 18062, 18068, 18092
- Area codes: 610 and 484
- FIPS code: 42-077-79160
- Primary airport: Lehigh Valley International Airport
- Major hospital: Lehigh Valley Hospital–Cedar Crest
- School district: East Penn
- Website: www.uppermilford.net

Upper Milford Township is a township in Lehigh County, Pennsylvania, United States. The township's population was 7,292 at the 2010 census. Upper Milford Township is a rural area southwest of Allentown in the Lehigh Valley, which had a population of 861,899 and was the 68th-most populous metropolitan area in the U.S. as of the 2020 census.

== Geography ==
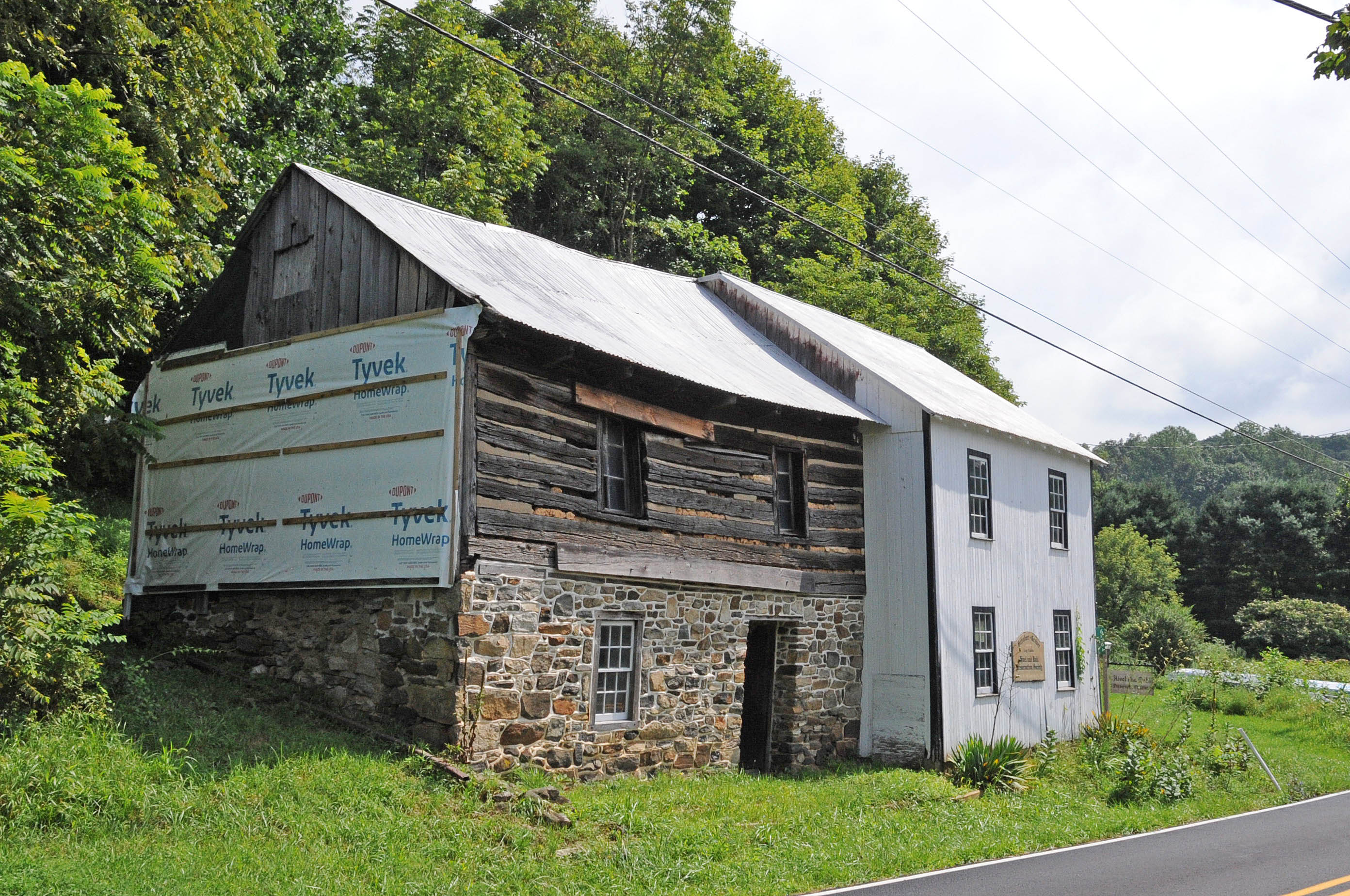
The Schubert-Graber log-post shop, constructed in the 1735 in Zionsville in Upper Milford Township, the township's oldest building structure, August 2020

According to the U.S. Census Bureau, the township has a total area of 18.0 square miles (46.6 km^{2}), of which 18.0 square miles (46.5 km^{2}) are land and 0.05 square miles (0.13 km^{2}), or 0.27%, are water. A large portion of the township is located on South Mountain and elevations in the township range from approximately 350 to 1,050 feet (110 to 320 m) above sea level. Upper Milford is part of the Delaware River watershed and is drained by Little Lehigh Creek and Saucon Creek into Lehigh River and by Perkiomen Creek into the Schuylkill River.

The township's five prominent villages are Old Zionsville, Powder Valley, Shimerville, Vera Cruz, and Zionsville. Dillinger is a small village in eastern Upper Milford Township. Two smaller villages, Corning and Sigmund, are in the southwestern section of the township.

Upper Milford Township has a hot-summer humid continental climate (Dfa) and is in hardiness zone 7a except for the highest areas which are 6b. The average monthly temperature ranges from 28.4 °F (−2.0 °C) in January to 72.7 °F (22.6 °C) in July.

=== Adjacent municipalities ===
- Emmaus (north)
- Salisbury Township (north)
- Upper Saucon Township (northeast)
- Lower Milford Township (southeast)
- Upper Hanover Township (tangent to the south)
- Hereford Township (southwest)
- Lower Macungie Township (northwest)
- Macungie (northwest)

== Demographics ==
Historical population
Census	Pop.	Note	%±
2000	6,889		—
2010	7,292		5.8%
2020	7,777		6.7%
U.S. Decennial Census

As of the 2000 census, there were 6,889 people, 2,514 households, and 2,021 families residing in the township. The population density was 384.7 inhabitants per square mile (148.5/km^{2}). There were 2,576 housing units at an average density of 143.9 units per square mile (55.6 units/km^{2}). The racial makeup of the township was 98.30% White, 0.16% African American, 0.09% Native American, 0.68% Asian, 0.20% from other races, and 0.57% from two or more races. Hispanic or Latino of any race were 1.02% of the population.

There were 2,514 households, out of which 34.7% had children under the age of 18 living with them, 72.2% were married couples living together, 5.7% had a female householder with no husband present, and 19.6% were non-families. 15.6% of all households were made up of individuals, and 5.3% had someone living alone who was 65 years of age or older. The average household size was 2.74 and the average family size was 3.07.

In the township, the population was spread out, with 24.3% under the age of 18, 6.6% from 18 to 24, 28.8% from 25 to 44, 28.0% from 45 to 64, and 12.3% who were 65 years of age or older. The median age was 40 years. For every 100 females there were 102.5 males. For every 100 females age 18 and over, there were 100.7 males. The median income for a household in the township was $66,694, and the median income for a family was $72,159. Males had a median income of $47,532 versus $29,538 for females. The per capita income for the township was $30,454. About 0.5% of families and 1.3% of the population were below the poverty line, including 1.0% of those under age 18 and none of those age 65 or over.

== Education ==
Upper Milford Township is served by East Penn School District. Emmaus High School in Emmaus serves grades nine through 12. Eyer Middle School and Lower Macungie Middle School, both located in Macungie, serve grades six through eight.

== Transportation ==
=== Roads and highways ===
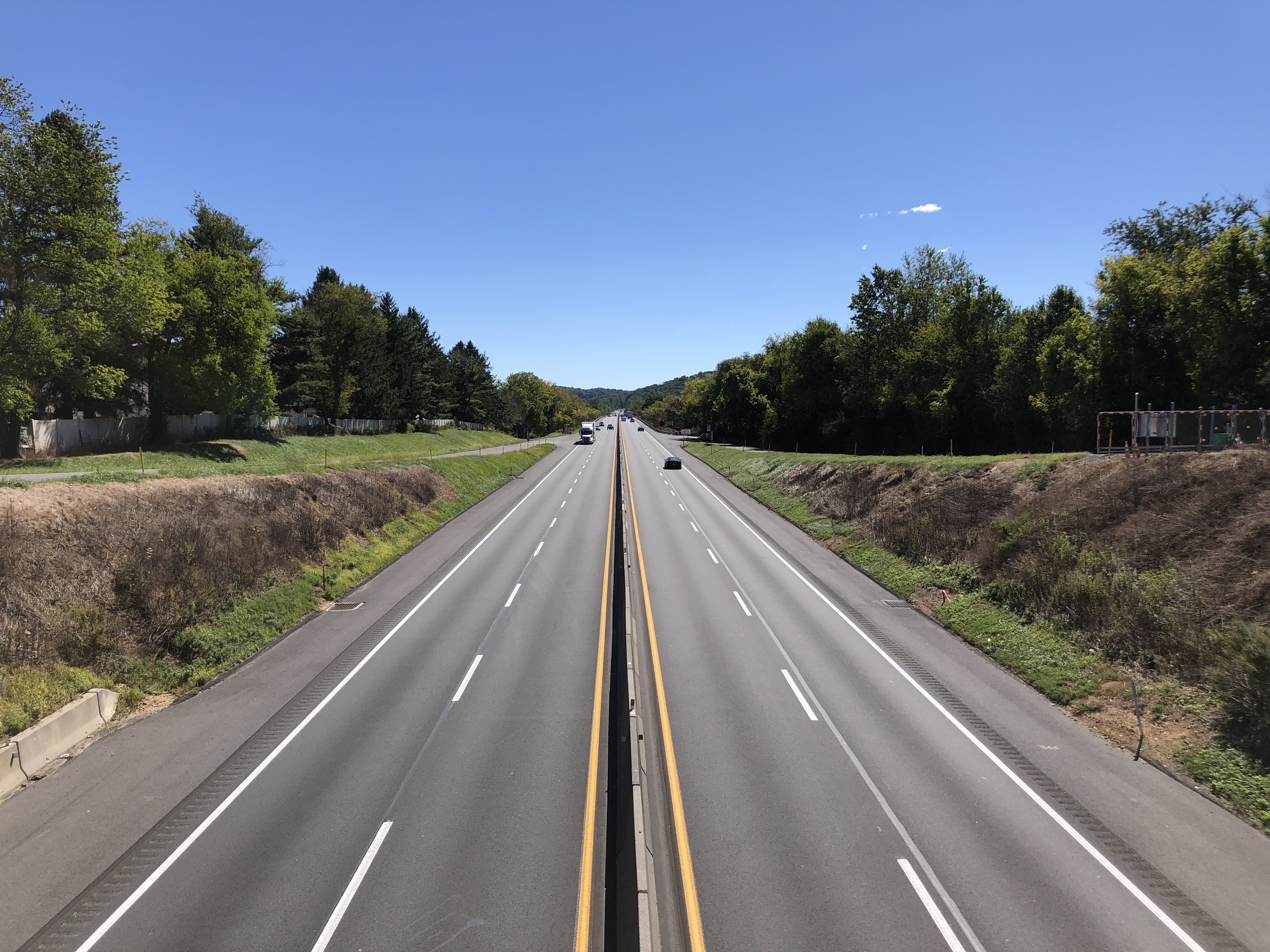
Interstate 476, the Northeast Extension of Pennsylvania Turnpike South, in Upper Milford Township

As of 2022, there were 80.32 miles (129.26 km) of public roads in Upper Milford Township, of which 2.80 miles (4.51 km) were maintained by the Pennsylvania Turnpike Commission (PTC), 22.79 miles (36.68 km) were maintained by the Pennsylvania Department of Transportation (PennDOT) and 54.73 miles (88.08 km) were maintained by the township.

Interstate 476 follows the Pennsylvania Turnpike's Northeast Extension along a northwest–southeast alignment through the township, but the nearest interchange is in South Whitehall Township. Pennsylvania Route 29 and Pennsylvania Route 100 meet in Shimerville and continue down Chestnut Street to Hereford just over the Berks County line. Chestnut Street, Kings Highway, Vera Cruz Road, and Powder Valley Road are all north-to-south routes. St. Peters Road/Shimerville Road/Main Road/Brunner Road crosses it SW-to-NE and Churchview Road proceeds east from Old Zionsville via Dillinger. Buckeye Road is an east-to-west road connecting Pennsylvania Route 29 (Chestnut Street) to Pennsylvania Route 100 in Macungie.

=== Public transportation ===
The township has not been served by LANta since bus service to and from Macungie was truncated to Emmaus except for the flex route 501, which requires a reservation and serves Allentown, Emmaus, Macungie, and Alburtis.

=== Train facilities ===
The township has tracks from the East Penn Railroad and Norfolk Southern.

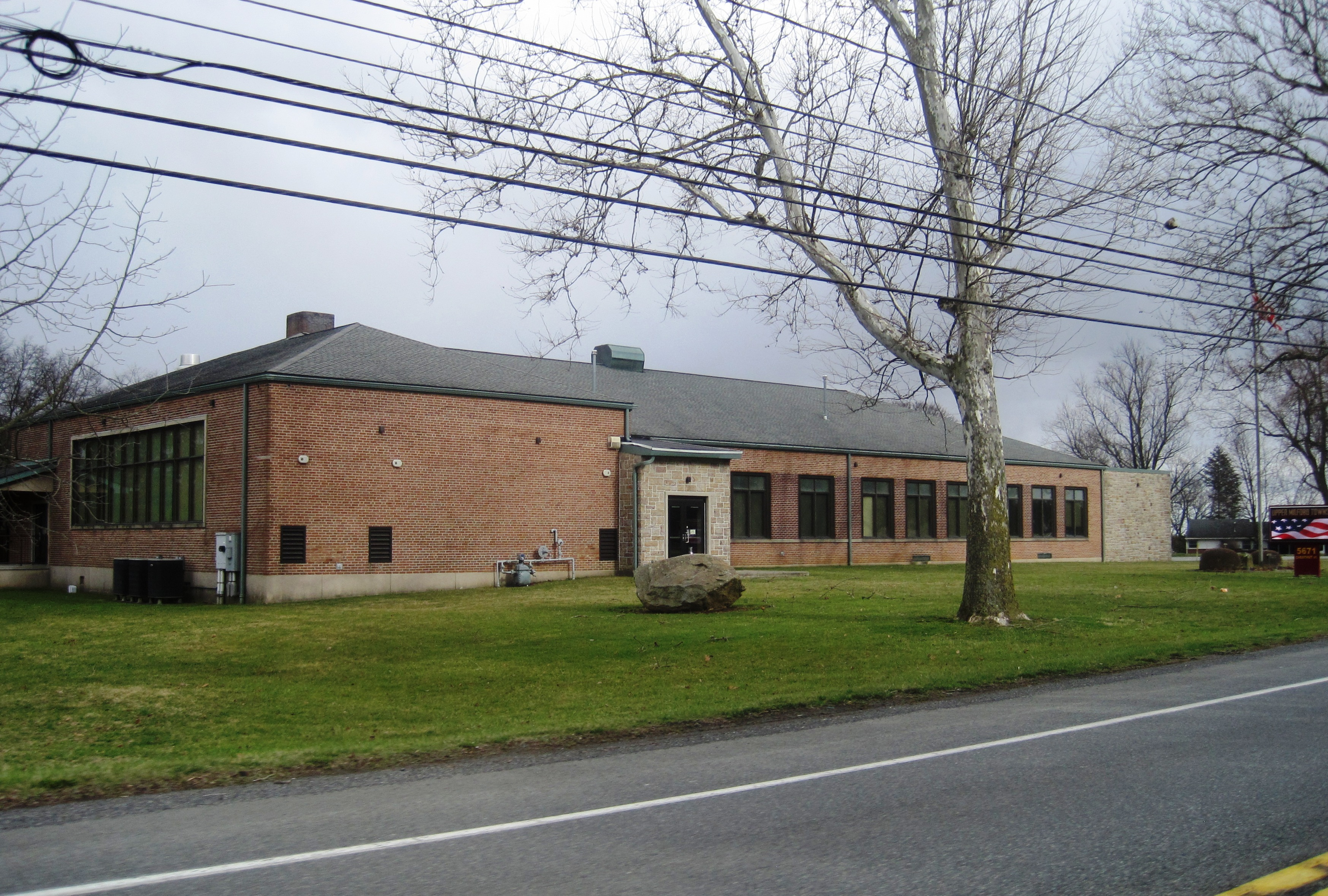
Upper Milford Town Hall

United States presidential election results for Upper Milford Township, Pennsylvania
Year	Republican		Democratic		Third party(ies)	
Year	No.	%	No.	%	No.	%
2024	3,086	55.79%	2,387	43.16%	58	1.05%
2020	2,908	55.51%	2,269	43.31%	62	1.18%
2016	2,512	57.96%	1,639	37.82%	183	4.22%
2012	2,321	57.72%	1,639	40.76%	61	1.52%
2008	2,041	51.33%	1,889	47.51%	46	1.16%
2004	2,160	55.61%	1,696	43.67%	28	0.72%

== Emergency services ==
=== Fire ===
The township two fire the western district fire company on Rt 100 and the citizens fire company on Main Rd west next to interstate 476. Both stations are run by volunteers. The stations both house tornado sirens, western district fire co has a STH-10, while the citizens fire co has a FS model 5.

=== Police ===
The township has a sheriff but the township is served by the Pennsylvania State Police.

== Notable people ==
- Sadie Lea Weidner, Christian missionary to Japan
