= Lower Macungie Township, Pennsylvania =

Township in Pennsylvania, US

Lower Macungie Township
- Township
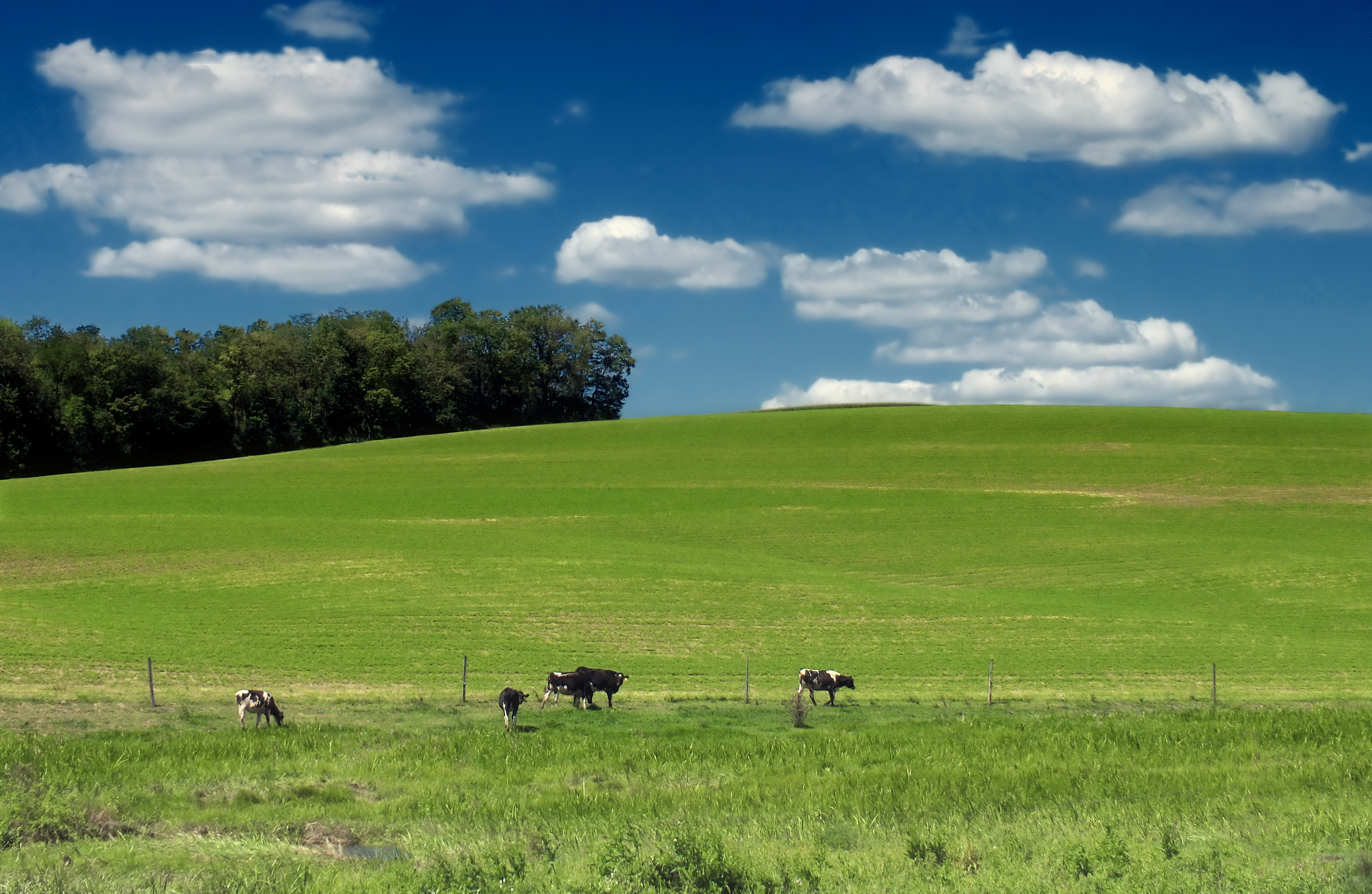
- A Lower Macungie Township farm in August 2011

- logo

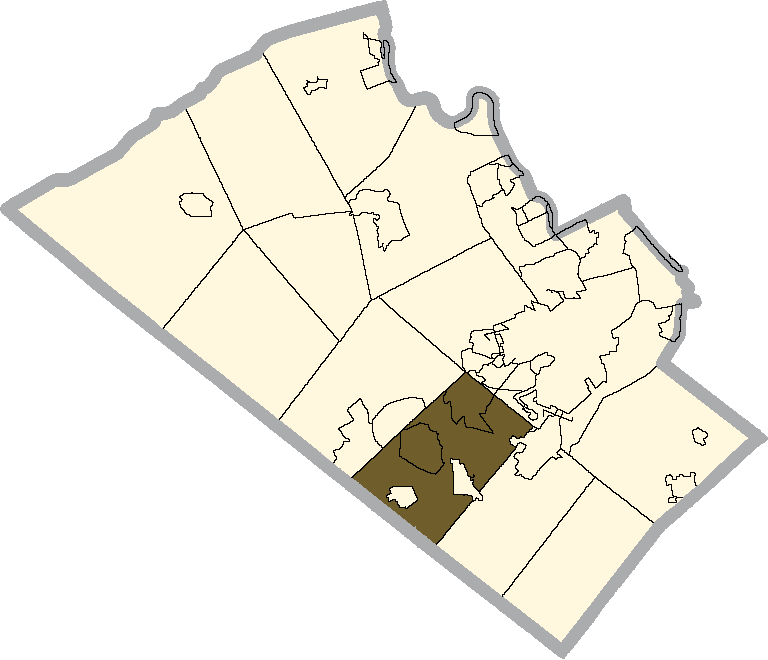
- Location of Lower Macungie Township in Lehigh County, Pennsylvania

- Location of Lower Macungie Township in Pennsylvania Location in the United States
- Coordinates: 40°32′51″N 75°33′58″W
- Country: United States
- State: Pennsylvania
- County: Lehigh

Area
  - Township: 22.46 sq mi (58.18 km^{2})
  - Land: 22.37 sq mi (57.94 km^{2})
  - Water: 0.089 sq mi (0.23 km^{2})
- Elevation: 417 ft (127 m)

Population (2020)
  - Township: 32,426
  - Density: 1,449/sq mi (559.6/km^{2})
  - Metro: 865,310 (US: 68th)
- Time zone: UTC-5 (EST)
  - Summer (DST): UTC-4 (EDT)
- ZIP Codes: 18011, 18046, 18049, 18062, 18103, 18104, 18106, and 19539
- Area code: 610
- FIPS code: 42-077-44952
- GNIS feature ID: 1216689
- Primary airport: Lehigh Valley International Airport
- Major hospital: Lehigh Valley Hospital–Cedar Crest
- School district: East Penn
- Website: www.lowermac.com

Lower Macungie Township is a township in Lehigh County, Pennsylvania, United States. The township's population was 32,426 as of the 2020 census, making it the second-largest population center in Lehigh County after Allentown and the third-largest population center in the Lehigh Valley metropolitan area after Allentown and Bethlehem.

Lower Macungie Township is located 7.1 miles (11.4 km) southwest of Allentown 60.8 miles (97.8 km) northwest of Philadelphia, and 95.5 miles (153.7 km) west of New York City. The township is part of the Lehigh Valley, which had a population of 861,899 and was the third-largest populated metropolitan region in Pennsylvania and 68th-most populous metropolitan area in the U.S. as of 2020.

== History ==
Before European settlement, the area that now includes Lower Macungie Township was inhabited by the Lenape Indian tribe. They hunted here, and are known to have had a few small seasonal villages and jasper workshops close to streams and springs. Jasper from their quarries outside present-day Macungie and Vera Cruz was traded throughout North America.

The name Macungie is derived from a Native American word meaning "bear swamp," or "place where bears feed." The early Pennsylvania German settlers took land that had been hunting grounds for the Lenni Lenape, adopting the Lenape name for the area. They cleared the scrub and forests, planted crops, raised livestock, and continually expanded their holdings. Most of what they produced fed their families and their hired and indentured servants, but some crops were grown for their cash value. Eventually they raised enough money to buy land warrants in Philadelphia from the proprietors, including William Penn's heirs.

The Rodale Organic Gardening Experimental Farm, located in Lower Macungie Township, was added to the National Register of Historic Places in 1999.

== Geography ==
Lower Macungie Township is located in southern Lehigh County. According to the U.S. Census Bureau, the township has a total area of 22.5 square miles (58.2 km^{2}), of which 22.4 square miles (57.9 km^{2}) are land and 0.1 square miles (0.2 km^{2}), or 0.40%, are water. Little Lehigh Creek and Swabia Creek drain and wind through the township from sources in Berks and Lehigh counties. Swabia Creek joins Little Lehigh Creek in the township and the latter drains into the Lehigh River in Allentown.

South Mountain crosses the township's southern tier, just south of the boroughs of Alburtis and Macungie. Lower Macungie has a hot-summer humid continental climate (Dfa) and is in hardiness zone 6b. The average monthly temperature at Willow Lane Elementary School ranges from 29.2 °F (−1.6 °C) in January to 73.8 °F (23.2 °C) in July.

The township contains the census-designated place of Ancient Oaks.

== Demographics ==
Historical population
Census	Pop.	Note	%±
1970	8,814		—
1980	12,958		47.0%
1990	16,871		30.2%
2000	19,220		13.9%
2010	30,633		59.4%
2020	32,426		5.9%

At the 2010 census, there were 30,633 people living in the township. The population was 84.6% Non-Hispanic White, 3.3% Black or African American, 0.1% Native American and Alaskan Native, 6.0% Asian, 1.6% from two or more race, and 1.6% from some other race. 5.0% of the population were Hispanic or Latino.

At the 2000 census, there were 19,220 people, 7,158 households and 5,611 families living in the township. The population density was 851.5 inhabitants per square mile (328.8/km^{2}) There were 7,405 housing units at an average density of 328.1 per square mile (126.7/km^{2}). The racial makeup of the township was 93.77% White, 0.58% African-American, 0.11% Native American, 4.31% Asian, 0.48% from other races, and 0.74% from two or more races. Hispanic or Latino of any race were 1.52% of the population.

There were 7,158 households, of which 34.9% had children under the age of 18 living with them, 70.2% were married couples living together, 6.1% had a female householder with no husband present, and 21.6% were non-families. 18.2% of all households were made up of individuals, and 7.3% had someone living alone who was 65 years of age or older. The average household size was 2.65 and the average family size was 3.03.

Age distribution was 25.2% under the age of 18, 5.3% from 18 to 24, 26.1% from 25 to 44, 29.3% from 45 to 64, and 14.2% who were 65 years of age or older. The median age was 41 years. For every 100 females there were 95.4 males. For every 100 females age 18 and over, there were 91.7 males. The median household income was $69,592, and the median family income was $78,695. Males had a median income of $60,325 versus $33,145 for females. The per capita income for the township was $30,202. About 1.3% of families and 2.3% of the population were below the poverty line, including 3.1% of those under age 18 and 2.1% of those age 65 or over.

== Industry ==
Lower Macungie Township is home to the primary manufacturing facilities of Mack Trucks, special effects manufacturer Smooth-On, and Allen Organ Company.

== Government ==
The municipality uses the Pennsylvania State Police (PSP) as the sole form of law enforcement. As of 2016 it is the second most populous Pennsylvania municipality to do so. Stopping vehicles for traffic violations made up the majority of police activity. Eleanor Klibanoff of WHYY-TV stated that "Lower Macungie has low crime". A proposal to create a local police department was put up to the ballot after a 2012 study was done, but the residents declined to create a police department.

United States presidential election results for Lower Macungie Township, Pennsylvania
Year	Republican		Democratic		Third party(ies)	
Year	No.	%	No.	%	No.	%
2024	9,768	48.13%	10,271	50.60%	258	1.27%
2020	9,632	48.22%	10,156	50.85%	186	0.93%
2016	8,817	51.26%	7,722	44.89%	663	3.85%
2012	8,964	55.62%	7,007	43.48%	146	0.91%
2008	8,023	50.58%	7,684	48.45%	154	0.97%
2004	7,665	58.74%	5,259	40.30%	126	0.97%

== Transportation ==
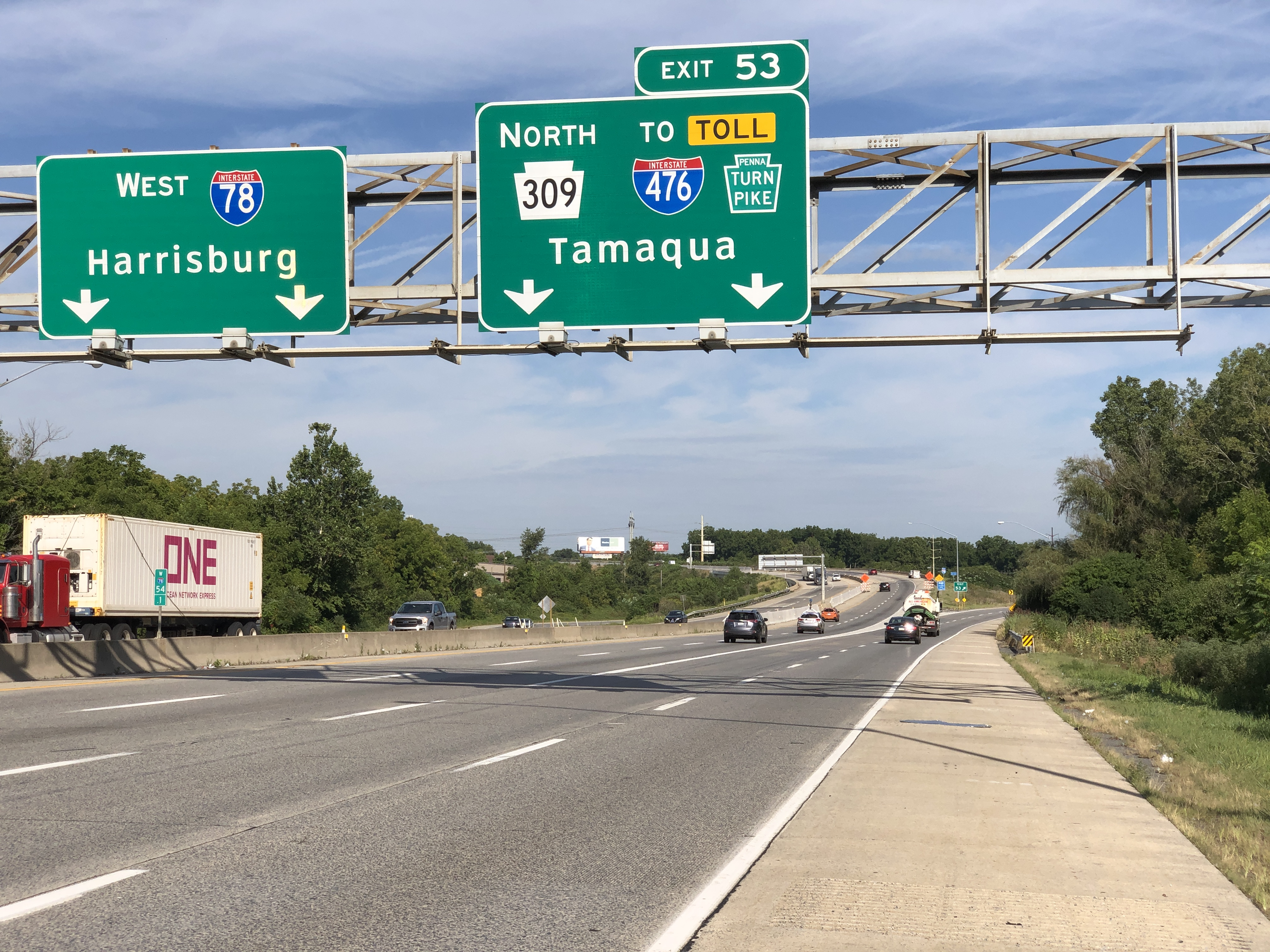
I-78 West and PA Route 309 North in Lower Macungie Township

As of 2022, there were 166.31 miles (267.65 km) of public roads in Lower Macungie Township, of which 3.60 miles (5.79 km) were maintained by the Pennsylvania Turnpike Commission (PTC), 37.45 miles (60.27 km) were maintained by the Pennsylvania Department of Transportation (PennDOT) and 125.26 miles (201.59 km) were maintained by the township.

The most prominent major highway serving Lower Macungie Township is I-78, which briefly passes through the extreme northern tip of the township. Pennsylvania Route 309 becomes concurrent with I-78 there on its way southbound. I-476 follows the Pennsylvania Turnpike's Northeast Extension along a northwest–southeast alignment across the northeastern part of the township; the nearest interchange is in South Whitehall Township.

Lower Macungie's main north-to-south local roads are Route 100, Spring Creek Road, Willow Road, Brookside Road, and both Route 29 and Cedar Crest Boulevard in the extreme east. Main east-to-west roads include US 222, Lower Macungie Road, and Mountain Road in the south. Sauerkraut Lane is a residential route extending from Indian Creek Road just west of Emmaus four miles west to Route 100 and is being extended to Spring Creek Road north of Alburtis.

LANta buses serve the northern tier of the township on LANta's bus route 322. The Park and Ride lot in Wescosville provides intercity bus service.

=== Neighboring municipalities ===
- Upper Macungie Township (northwest)
- South Whitehall Township (north)
- Salisbury Township (northeast)
- Emmaus (east)
- Upper Milford Township (southeast)
- Macungie (southeast)
- Alburtis (surrounded by Lower Macungie)
- Hereford Township, Berks County (southwest)
- Longswamp Township, Berks County (southwest)

== Education ==
Lower Macungie Township is served by the East Penn School District. Students in grades nine through 12 attend Emmaus High School in Emmaus. Middle school students attend Eyer Middle School or Lower Macungie Middle School, both located in Macungie. Two elementary schools, Wescosville and Willow Lane Elementary Schools and a private school for students with learning disabilities, Hillside School, are all located in Lower Macungie Township.

== Notable people ==
- Dane DeHaan, actor
- Todd Howard, video game director, Fallout 3, The Elder Scrolls IV: Oblivion, and The Elder Scrolls V: Skyrim
- Ryan Mackenzie, U.S. Representative
