= Valentine Weaver House =

Historic house in Pennsylvania, United States

- U.S. National Register of Historic Places
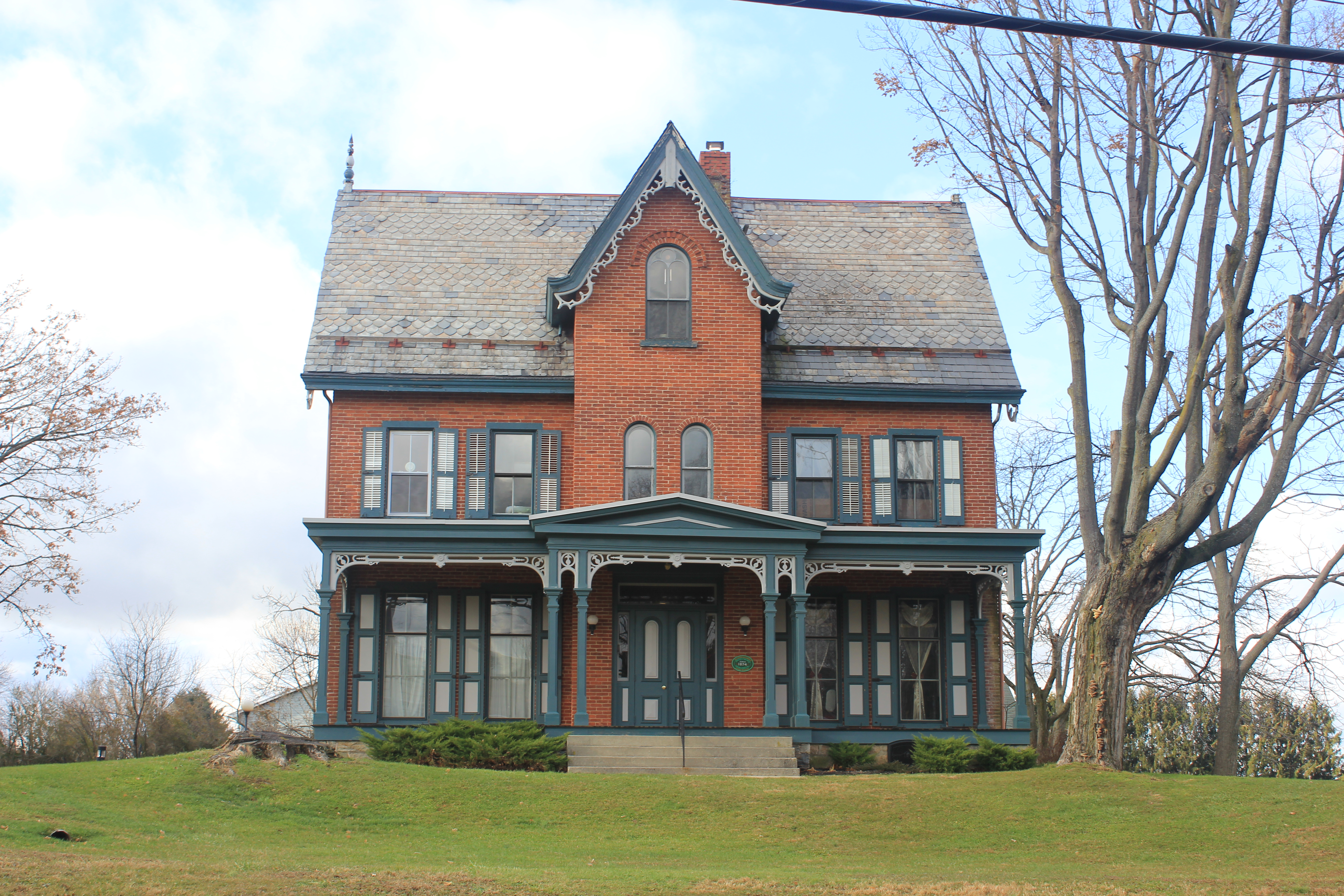
- Valentine Weaver House, December 2012

- Location within Pennsylvania Location within the United States
- Location: 146 S. Church St., Macungie, Pennsylvania, U.S.
- Coordinates: 40°30′40″N 75°33′21″W
- Area: 1.4 acres (0.57 ha)
- Built: 1876
- Architectural style: Gothic Cottage
- NRHP reference No.: 84003482
- Added to NRHP: June 28, 1984

The Valentine Weaver House, also known as the Weaver House, is a historic home that is located in Macungie, Lehigh County, Pennsylvania, United States.

It was added to the National Register of Historic Places in 1984.

== History and architectural features ==
Built in 1876, this historic structure is a three-story brick dwelling that was created in the form of a Gothic Cottage. It has a central projecting pavilion on the front façade, a patterned slate roof, and a full-width front porch. Also located on the property are a brick octagonal outhouse, a brick smokehouse, a spring house, and an ice house.
