= Kemmerer House =

Historic house in Pennsylvania, United States

- U.S. National Register of Historic Places
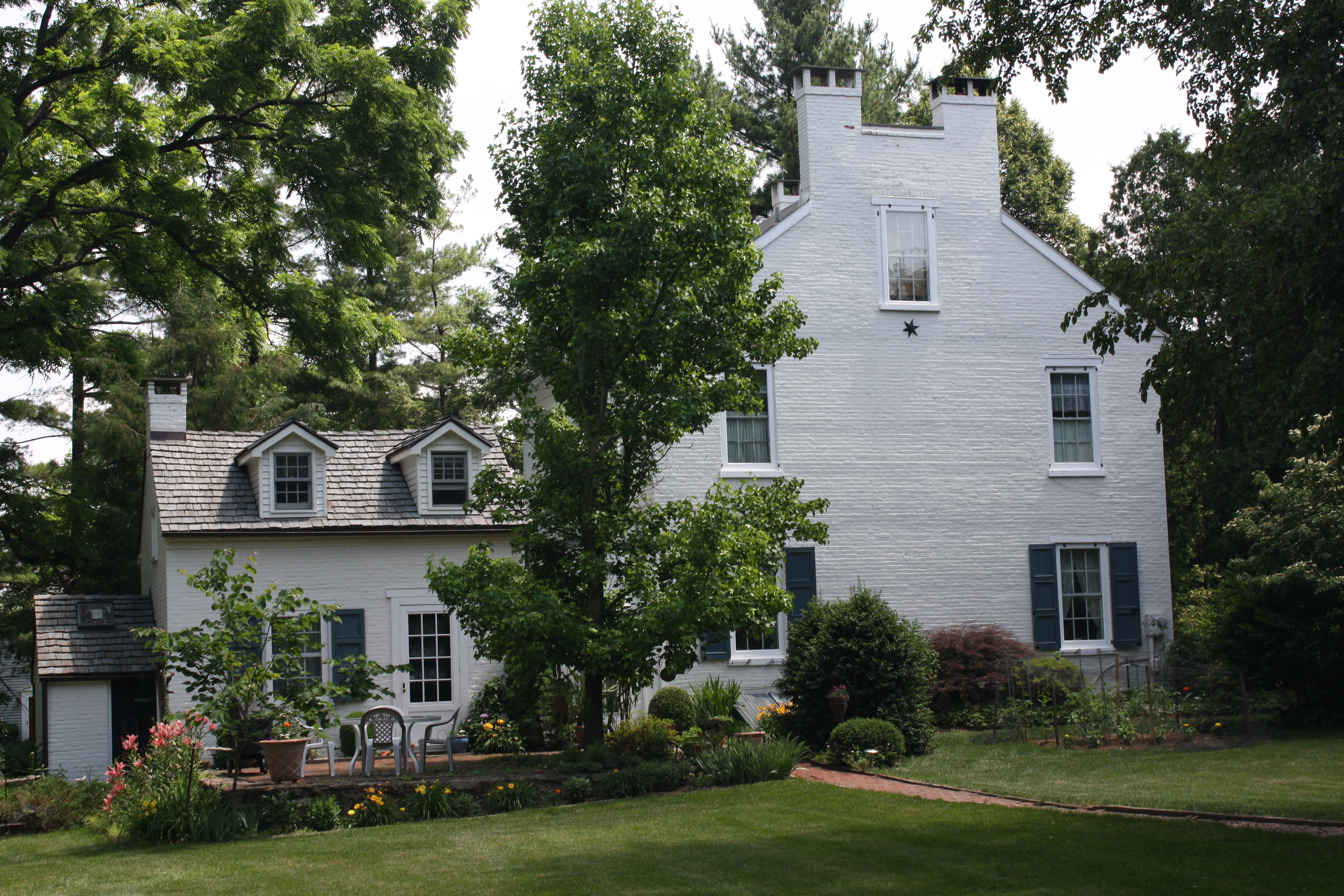
- Kemmerer House in Emmaus, Pennsylvania, June 2013

- Location within Pennsylvania Location within the United States
- Location: 3 Iroquois Street, Emmaus, Pennsylvania, U.S.
- Coordinates: 40°32′54.4″N 75°29′57.3″W
- Area: 0.5 acres (0.20 ha)
- Built: c. 1851
- Architectural style: Georgian forebay barn
- NRHP reference No.: 77001173
- Added to NRHP: September 14, 1977

Kemmerer House, also known as the Mr. & Mrs. Russell L. Pellett Residence and Irongate, is a historic home located in Emmaus, Pennsylvania, United States. It was built between 1840 and 1850 and is a two-story, masonry dwelling with Georgian style influences. It has a five bay wide front facade. Also on the property is a Pennsylvania-German forbay barn.

It was added to the National Register of Historic Places in 1977.

== History ==
According to the nomination form which was completed during the 1970s and submitted to the U.S. Department of Interior by Madeline L. Cohen, Office of Historic Preservation, John K. Heyl, and Mr. and Mrs. Russell Pellett, which ultimately led to the home's placement on the National Register of Historic Places, "it is evident from the height of the ceilings, the type of fireplace and the profiles of the millwork that the date of [this home's] construction antedates the period of the Civil War....Another feature reinforces this; in the cellar of the existing house is an 18th century 'root cellar' (a further, deeper excavation beneath the basement floor) entered by a flight of steps and closed with wood batten doors. The oldest (1750) house still intact in nearby Emmaus has an identical sub-cellar for the storage of food and wine."

The nomination form completed by Cohen, et al. also provided the following additional historical details:

"Frederick X. Camerer was the original settler of the Kemmerer Homestead. John George, his son, received part of the original parcel. John George's son, Henry Walter, also worked the farm. Henry Walter Kemmerer was probably responsible for the building of the main house at the time of his father's death (1851)."

== Architecture ==
The nomination form submitted to the U.S. Department of the Interior, which requested placement of the Kemmerer House on the National Register of Historic Places, describes the home during the 1970s as a "sizable brick masonry structure" and provides the following additional details regarding its architectural and landscape features:

"Its main (southern) facade has five equally spaced bays with the central one at grade being a transomed, side-lighted entrance door. Originally there was a square columned entrance portico with simple Greek Revival detail.

.... A small story wing (once detached 'summer kitchen') is definitely of an earlier period and suggests that the present main house is a latter-day replacement of an earlier one that used the same stone foundations....

The main interior stairs have been refurbished, the hall retaining them has had one wall removed to enlarge the present living room; also the dividing wall separating the original paired parlors has gone to provide a single, ample living room space. The dining room and kitchen on the eastside of the house retain their original areas but are thoroughly modernized.

Upstairs the original configuration of rooms is still apparent but modern clothing storage closets have been constructed for each bedroom and a bath provided. The attic space has also been completely finished so that the original structural timbering is now out of sight except for the main struts.

.... Set back in a completely fenced yard which once contained orchard trees, ornamental flower beds and a kitchen garden, [the home] would have been framed by a pair of evergreens and several specimen trees of English box."

== Gallery ==
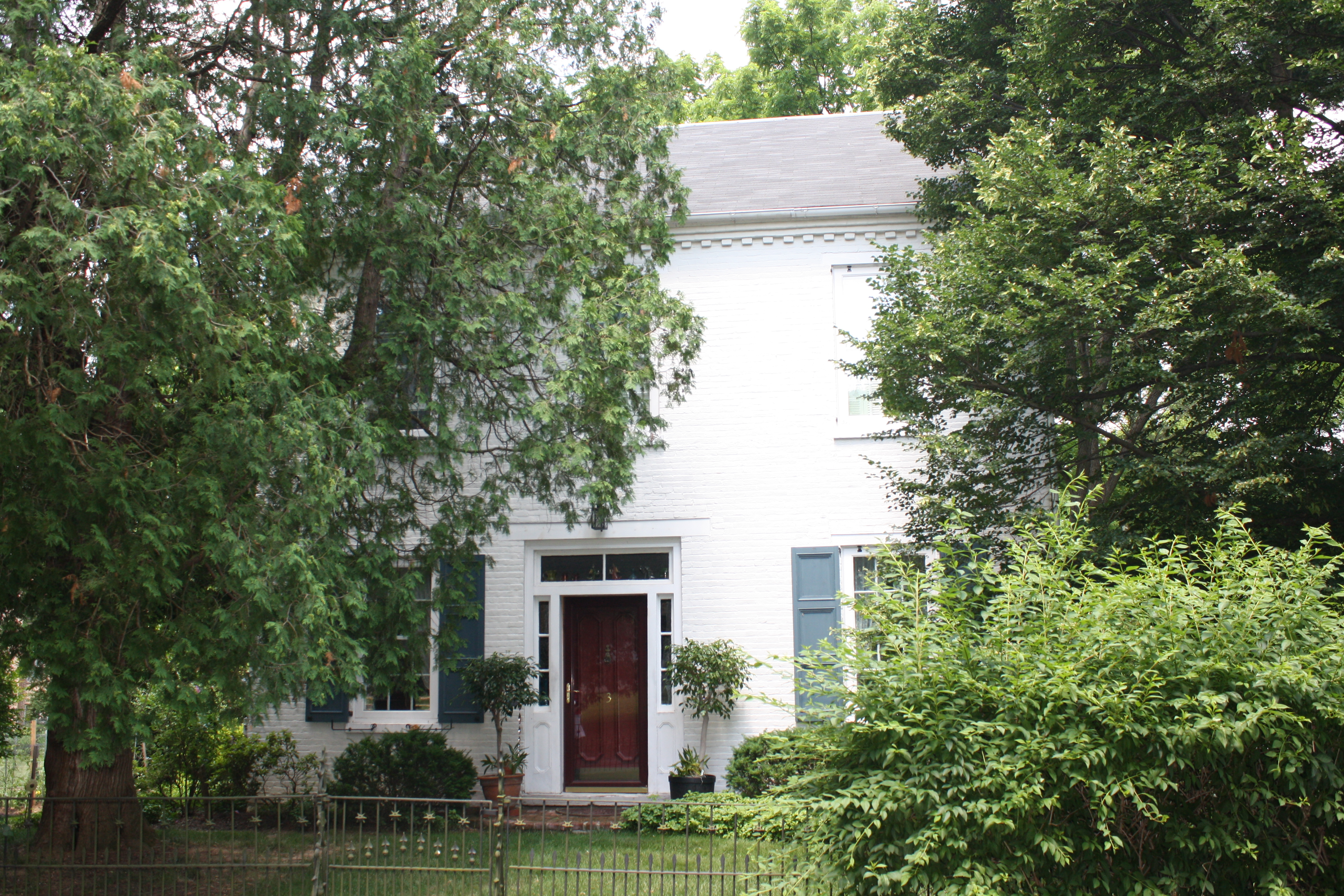
Front south side

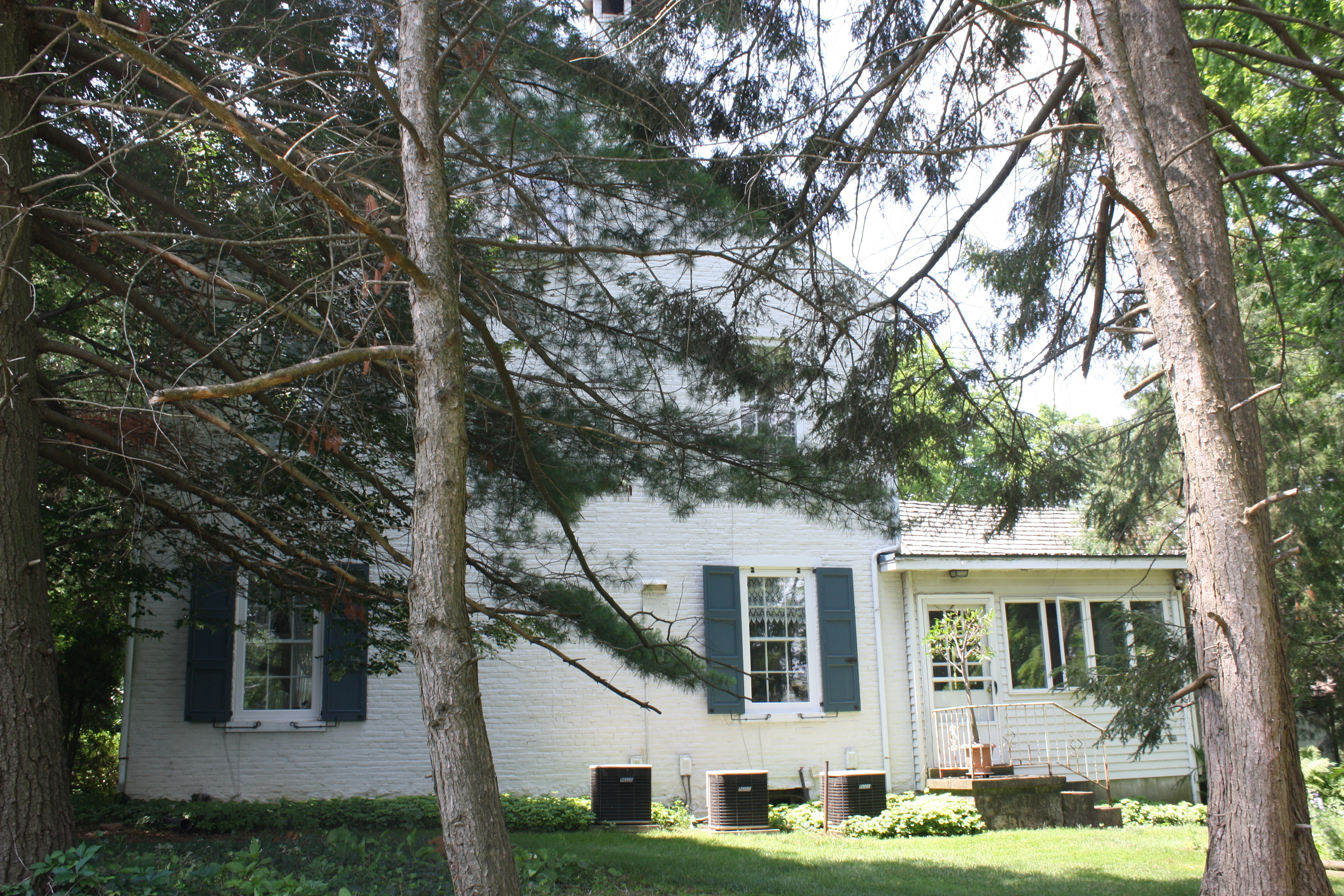
East side

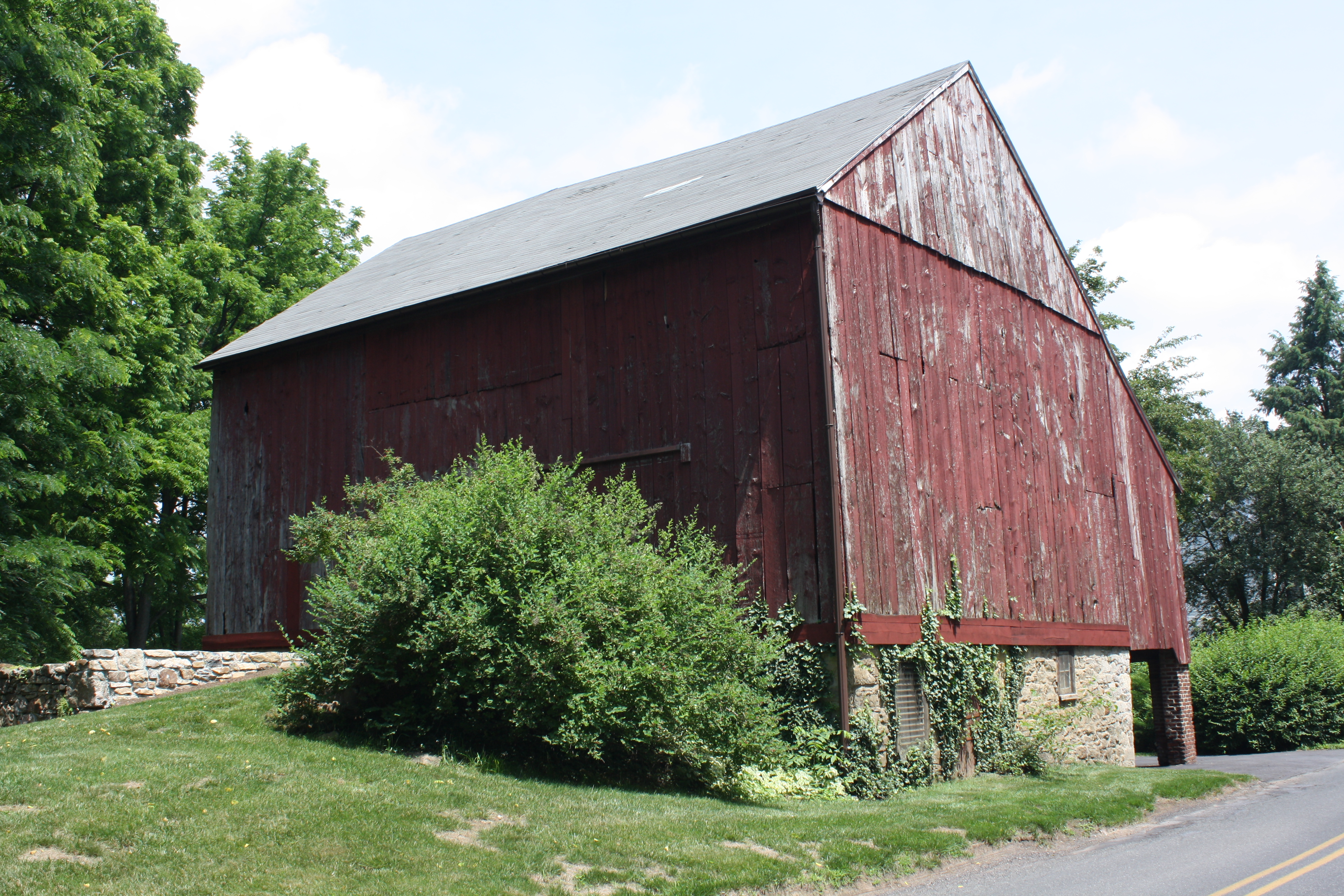
Foray barn

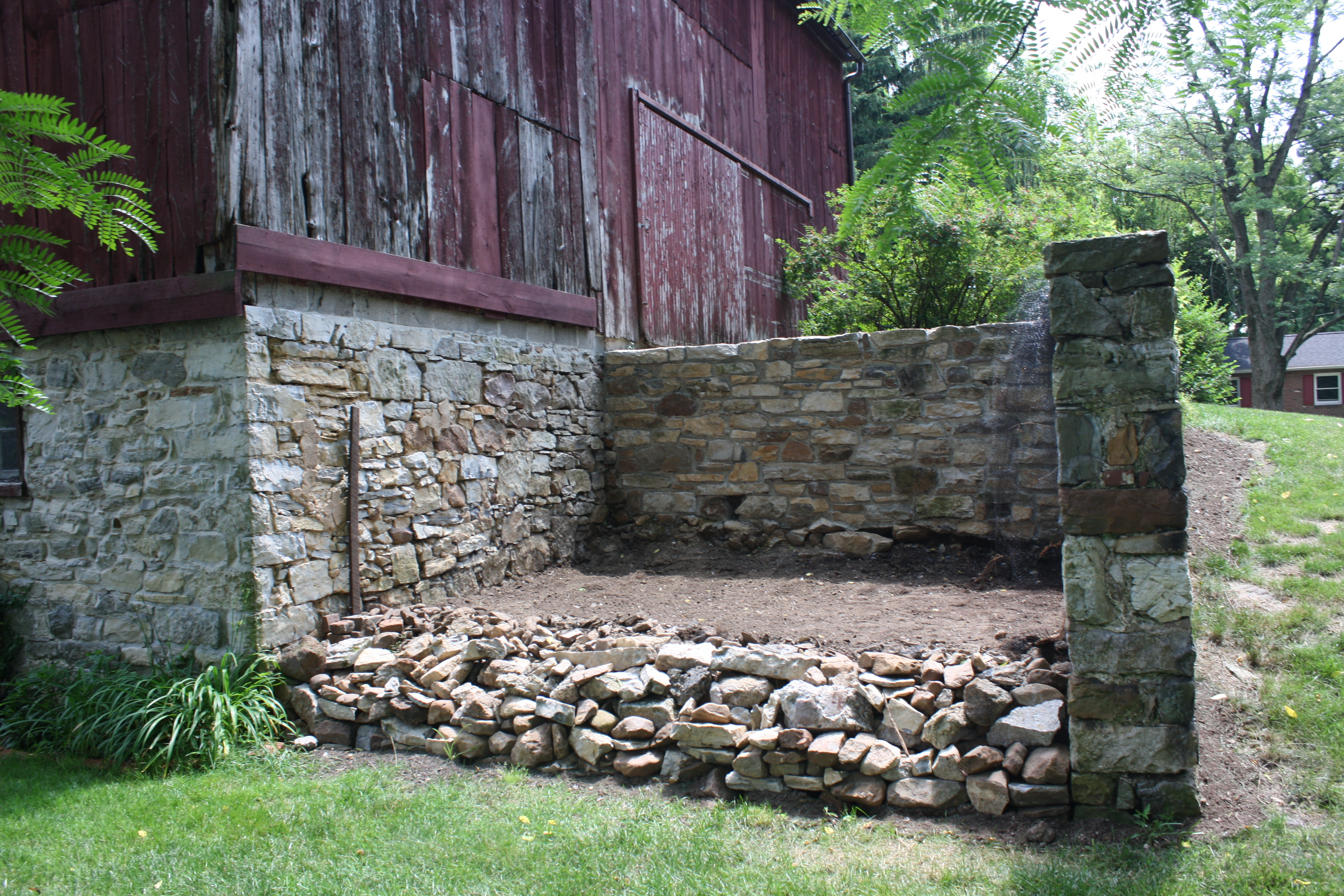
Foray barn, backyard
