= Macungie, Pennsylvania =

Borough in Pennsylvania, US

- Borough
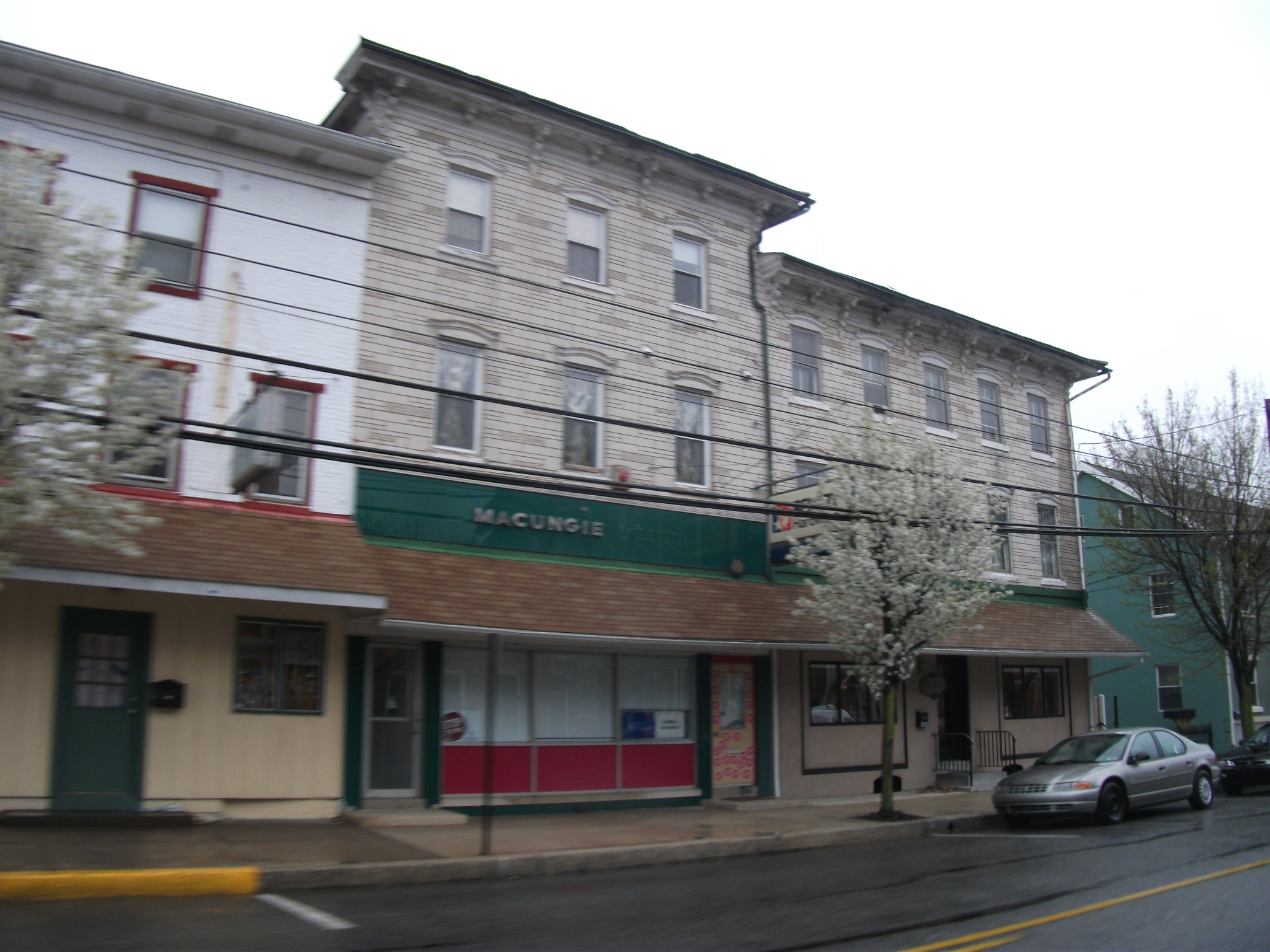
- Macungie in April 2011

- Seal

- Location of Macungie in Lehigh County, Pennsylvania (left) and of Lehigh County in Pennsylvania (right)

- Location of Macungie in Pennsylvania Location in the United States
- Coordinates: 40°30′50″N 75°33′09″W
- Country: United States
- State: Pennsylvania
- County: Lehigh

Area
  - Borough: 0.99 sq mi (2.56 km^{2})
  - Land: 0.99 sq mi (2.56 km^{2})
  - Water: 0 sq mi (0.00 km^{2})
- Elevation: 400 ft (120 m)

Population (2020)
  - Borough: 3,257
  - Density: 3,292.3/sq mi (1,271.17/km^{2})
  - Metro: 865,310 (US: 68th)
- Time zone: UTC-5 (EST)
  - Summer (DST): UTC-4 (EDT)
- ZIP Code: 18062
- Area codes: 610
- FIPS code: 42-46392
- Primary airport: Lehigh Valley International Airport
- Major hospital: Lehigh Valley Hospital–Cedar Crest
- School district: East Penn
- Website: www.macungie.pa.us

Macungie /məˈkʌndʒiː/ is a borough in Lehigh County, Pennsylvania, United States, its second oldest. As of the 2020 census, Macungie had a population of 3,257.

Macungie is a suburb of Allentown, and part of the Lehigh Valley metropolitan area, which had a population of 861,899 and was the 68th-most populous metropolitan statistical area in the U.S. as of the 2020 census.

== History ==
Macungie is derived from "Maguntsche", a place name used as early as 1730 to describe the region that is present-day Macungie and Emmaus, Pennsylvania. "Maguntsche" is a Lenape word, meaning either "bear swamp" or "feeding place of the bears". The borough's current seal depicts a bear coming to drink at water near some cattails. Valentine Weaver House in Macungie was added to the National Register of Historic Places in 1984.

Macungie was founded as Millerstown in 1776 by Peter Miller. On November 15, 1857, the village of Millerstown was incorporated as a borough.

During Fries's Rebellion in 1800, the United States Marshals Service began arresting people for tax resistance, and arrests were made without much incident until the marshal reached Millerstown, where a crowd formed to protect a man from arrest. Failing to make that arrest, the marshal arrested a few others and returned to Bethlehem, Pennsylvania, with his prisoners. Two separate groups of rebels independently vowed to liberate the prisoners and marched on Bethlehem. The militia prevailed, and John Fries, leader of the rebellion, and others were arrested. In 1875, the borough was renamed Macungie to avoid confusion with another town by the same name: Millerstown in Perry County, Pennsylvania.

== Geography ==
Macungie is located at 40°30′50″N 75°33′9″W (40.513945, -75.552491). According to the U.S. Census Bureau, the borough has a total area of 1.0 square mile (2.6 km^{2}), all land. Macungie is almost completely surrounded by Lower Macungie Township, except for a very small area in the southeast that neighbors Upper Milford Township. Swabia Creek flows from the west through the borough, receives Mountain Creek, and flows out of the borough to the northeast before draining into the Little Lehigh Creek.

Macungie has a hot-summer humid continental climate (Dfa) and is in hardiness zone 6b. Average monthly temperatures range from 29.2 °F (−1.6 °C) in January to 73.8 °F (23.2 °C) in July.

== Demographics ==
Historical population
Census	Pop.	Note	%±
1880	701		—
1890	644		−8.1%
1900	692		7.5%
1910	772		11.6%
1920	768		−0.5%
1930	842		9.6%
1940	856		1.7%
1950	983		14.8%
1960	1,266		28.8%
1970	1,414		11.7%
1980	1,899		34.3%
1990	2,597		36.8%
2000	3,039		17.0%
2010	3,074		1.2%
2020	3,257		6.0%

=== 2020 census ===
As of the 2020 census, Macungie had a population of 3,257. The median age was 40.0 years. 19.6% of residents were under the age of 18 and 18.2% of residents were 65 years of age or older. For every 100 females there were 89.6 males, and for every 100 females age 18 and over there were 84.8 males age 18 and over.

99.7% of residents lived in urban areas, while 0.3% lived in rural areas.

There were 1,468 households in Macungie, of which 26.1% had children under the age of 18 living in them. Of all households, 40.8% were married-couple households, 19.3% were households with a male householder and no spouse or partner present, and 29.9% were households with a female householder and no spouse or partner present. About 33.6% of all households were made up of individuals and 14.5% had someone living alone who was 65 years of age or older.

There were 1,520 housing units, of which 3.4% were vacant. The homeowner vacancy rate was 0.6% and the rental vacancy rate was 3.2%.

Racial composition as of the 2020 census
Race	Number	Percent
White	2,707	83.1%
Black or African American	113	3.5%
American Indian and Alaska Native	10	0.3%
Asian	83	2.5%
Native Hawaiian and Other Pacific Islander	0	0.0%
Some other race	134	4.1%
Two or more races	210	6.4%
Hispanic or Latino (of any race)	331	10.2%

=== 2000 census ===
As of the 2000 census, there were 3,039 people, 1,366 households, and 835 families residing in the borough. The population density was 3,057.0 inhabitants per square mile (1,180.3/km^{2}). There were 1,418 housing units at an average density of 1,426.4 units per square mile (550.7 units/km^{2}). The racial makeup of the borough was 94.87% White, 1.35% African American, 0.07% Native American, 2.11% Asian, 0.03% Pacific Islander, 0.82% from other races, and 0.76% from two or more races. Hispanic or Latino of any race were 1.35% of the population.

There were 1,366 households, out of which 26.1% had children under the age of 18 living with them, 48.8% were married couples living together, 9.7% had a female householder with no husband present, and 38.8% were non-families. 31.4% of all households were made up of individuals, and 9.9% had someone living alone who was 65 years of age or older. The average household size was 2.22 and the average family size was 2.81.

In the borough, the population was spread out, with 20.5% under the age of 18, 7.6% from 18 to 24, 33.4% from 25 to 44, 25.2% from 45 to 64, and 13.4% who were 65 years of age or older. The median age was 38 years. For every 100 females there were 90.8 males. For every 100 females age 18 and over, there were 89.9 males. The median income for a household in the borough was $51,721, and the median income for a family was $56,848. Males had a median income of $44,821 versus $34,722 for females. The per capita income for the borough was $26,965. About 1.7% of families and 3.5% of the population were below the poverty line, including 1.1% of those under age 18 and 6.0% of those age 65 or over.

United States presidential election results for Macungie, Pennsylvania
Year	Republican		Democratic		Third party(ies)	
Year	No.	%	No.	%	No.	%
2024	848	45.06%	1,005	53.40%	29	1.54%
2020	861	45.51%	1,002	52.96%	29	1.53%
2016	810	49.60%	748	45.81%	75	4.59%
2012	729	49.76%	715	48.81%	21	1.43%
2008	666	43.44%	839	54.73%	28	1.83%
2004	797	51.89%	723	47.07%	16	1.04%

== Industry ==
Macungie is the headquarters for the Allen Organ Company, a global manufacturer and distributor of organs. The primary manufacturing facility of Mack Trucks is located in neighboring Lower Macungie Township.

== Education ==
Macungie is served by the East Penn School District. Emmaus High School in Emmaus serves grades nine through twelve. Eyer Middle School and Lower Macungie Middle School, both located in Macungie, serve grades six through eight. Students in kindergarten through grade five attend either Macungie Elementary School, Shoemaker Elementary School, or Willow Lane Elementary School. Salem Christian School, a private Christian school serving preschool through high school, is located in Macungie.

== Transportation ==
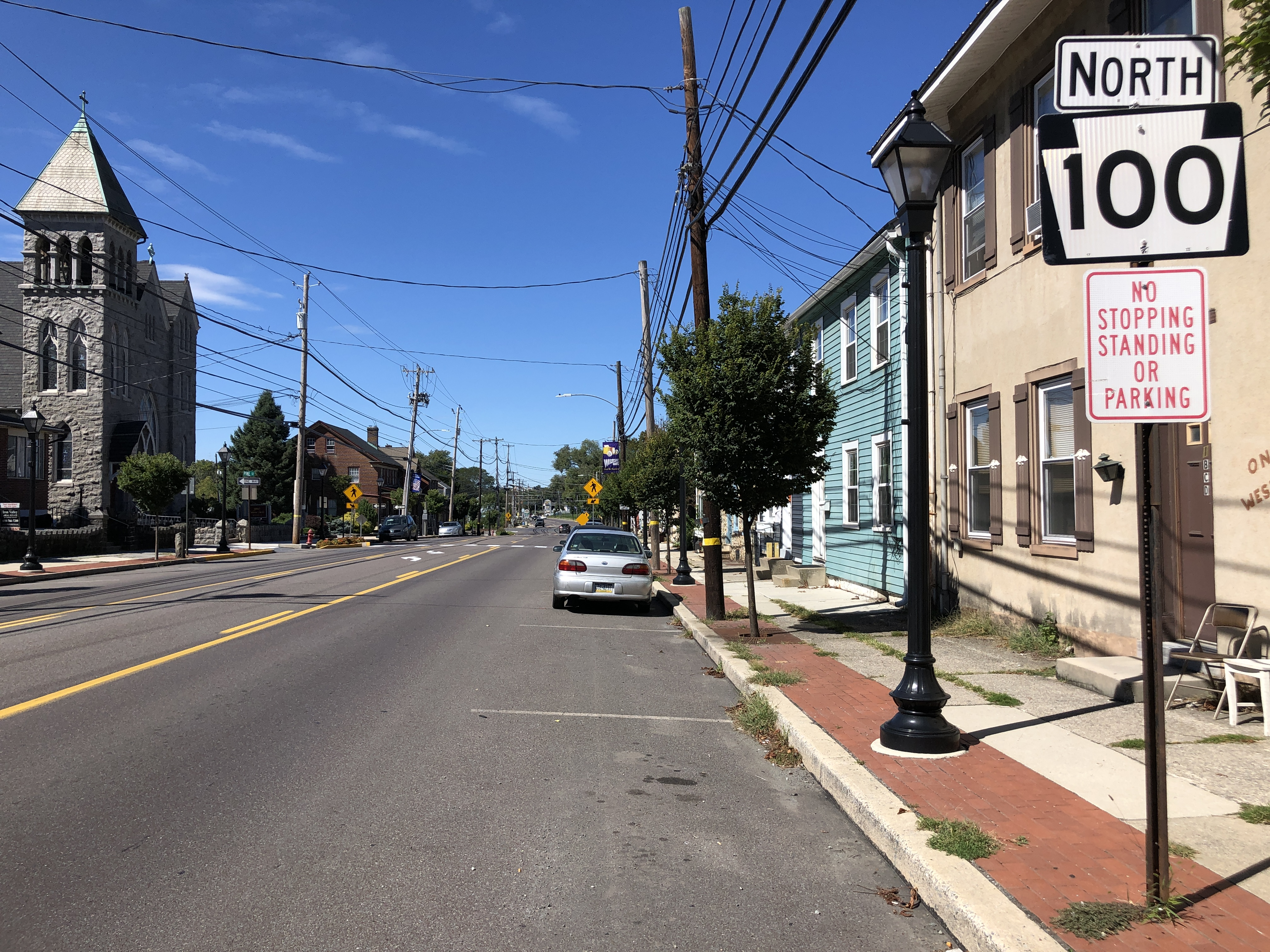
PA Route 100 northbound in Macungie

As of 2022, there were 9.75 miles (15.69 km) of public roads in Macungie, of which 2.03 miles (3.27 km) were maintained by the Pennsylvania Department of Transportation (PennDOT) and 7.72 miles (12.42 km) were maintained by the borough.

Pennsylvania Route 100 crosses Macungie southeast–northwest as Main Street. Other outlet streets include Church Street to the southwest, Chestnut Street to the southwest and east, Walnut and Lehigh streets east to Brookside Road, and Willow Lane to the north. LANta provides bus service to Macungie with LANtaFlex Route 501, which provides bus service through advance reservations and offers connections to fixed-route buses in Trexlertown, Emmaus, and at Lehigh Valley Hospital–Cedar Crest on Cedar Crest Boulevard in Allentown.

Norfolk Southern's Reading Line passes through the town; a picnic pavilion known as the Macungie Train Watching Platform is located trackside on Main Street. The site was once the location of the Macungie station.

== Recreation and local events ==
- Bear Creek Mountain Resort, a locally popular ski resort, is located just west of Macungie in Longswamp Township
- Das Awkscht Fescht, an antique car festival held annually the beginning of August in Macungie's Memorial Park
- Macungie Flower Park, located on Main Street next to the Macungie train station, contains over 10,000 flowers
- The Macungie Farmer's Market, held every Thursday evening between May and October in Macungie's Memorial Park
- Wheels of Time, a hot rod and custom car show, is held annually in Macungie's Memorial Park the weekend prior to Labor Day weekend

== Notable people ==
- Keith Dorney, former professional football player, Detroit Lions
- Michelle M. Marciniak, former University of South Carolina women's basketball coach and former WNBA professional basketball player, Portland Fire and Seattle Storm
- Heather Parry, film and television producer, The House Bunny (2008), Pixels (2015), and A Star Is Born (2018)
- Nicole Reinhart, former professional cyclist
- Elsie Singmaster, former author
- Kevin White, former professional football player, Chicago Bears, New Orleans Saints, and San Francisco 49ers
- Kyzir White, professional football player, San Francisco 49ers
