= Emmaus, Pennsylvania =

Borough in Pennsylvania, US

Borough of Emmaus
- Borough
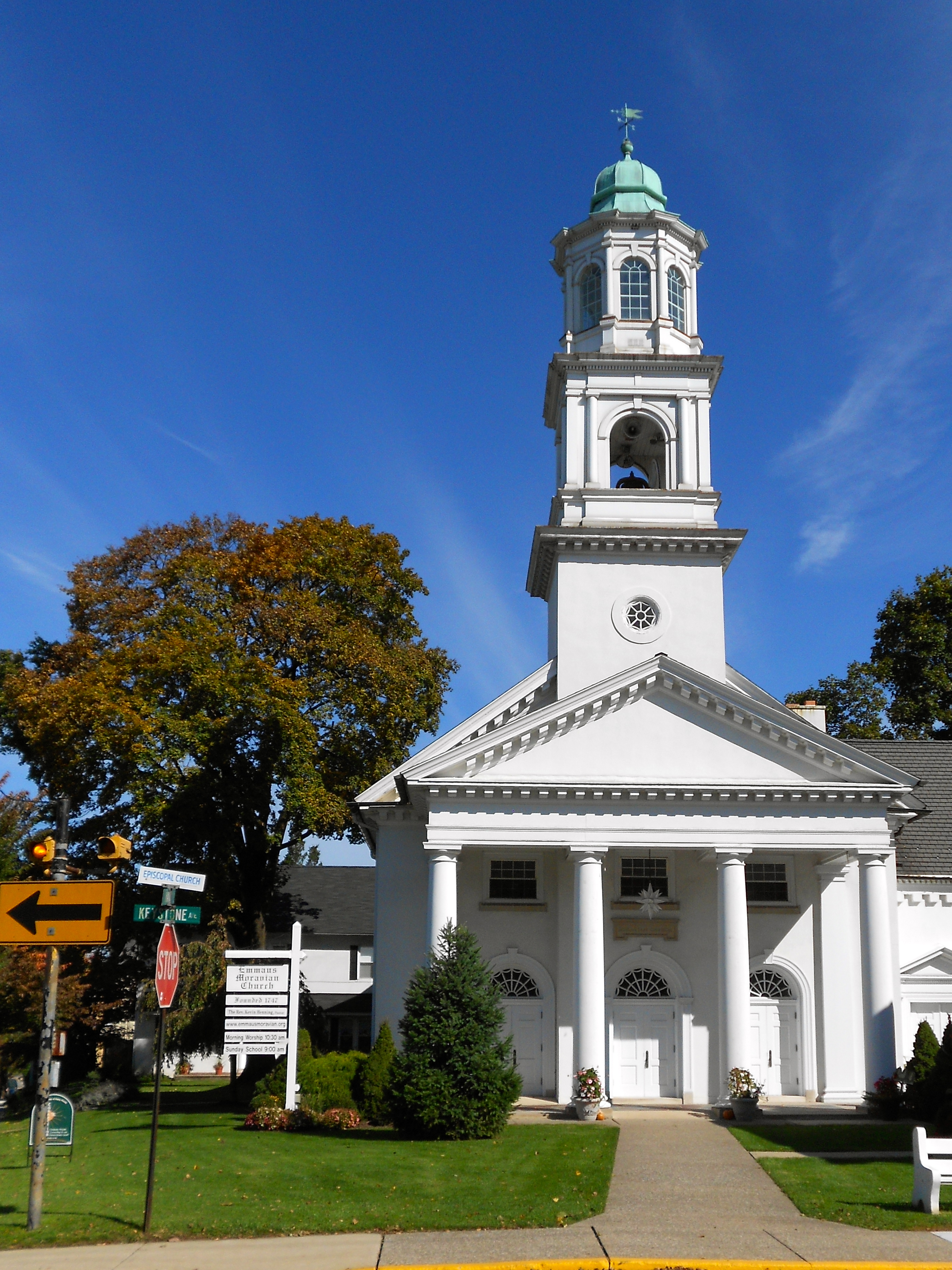
- Emmaus Moravian Church on Main Street in October 2012

- Seal

- Location of Emmaus in Lehigh County, Pennsylvania (left) and of Lehigh County in Pennsylvania (right)

- Location of Emmaus in Pennsylvania Emmaus (the United States)
- Coordinates: 40°32′13″N 75°29′45″W
- Country: United States
- State: Pennsylvania
- County: Lehigh
- Established: 1759

Government
  - Mayor: Lee Ann Gilbert (R)

Area
  - Borough: 2.90 sq mi (7.51 km^{2})
  - Land: 2.90 sq mi (7.50 km^{2})
  - Water: 0.0039 sq mi (0.01 km^{2})
- Elevation: 436 ft (133 m)

Population (2020)
  - Borough: 11,652
  - Density: 4,024.8/sq mi (1,553.97/km^{2})
  - Metro: 865,310 (US: 68th)
- Time zone: UTC-5 (EST)
  - Summer (DST): UTC-4 (EDT)
- ZIP Codes: 18049, 18098, and 18099
- Area code: 610
- FIPS code: 42-23584
- Primary airport: Lehigh Valley International Airport
- Major hospital: Lehigh Valley Hospital–Cedar Crest
- School district: East Penn
- Website: www.emmauspa.gov

Emmaus (/ɛˈmeɪ.əs/ em-AY-əs) is a borough in Lehigh County, Pennsylvania, United States. As of the 2020 U.S. census, it had a population of 11,652. Emmaus is located in the Lehigh Valley, the third-largest metropolitan area in Pennsylvania and 68th-largest metropolitan area in the nation.

In 2007 and again in 2009, Emmaus was listed as one of the top 100 "Best Places to Live" in the United States by Money magazine.

Emmaus is located 5 miles (8.0 km) south of Allentown, 53.4 miles (85.9 km) north of Philadelphia, and 91.6 miles (147.4 km) west of New York City.

== History ==
=== 18th century ===
Emmaus was settled in the early 1700s during the colonial era by German Protestants of the Lutheran and Reformed faiths who were fleeing religious persecution in Europe. Its earliest German settlers were primarily farmers.

In 1741, the land on which present-day Emmaus is located was donated to the Moravian Church by Sebastian Heinrich Knauss and Jacob Ehrenhardt for the purpose of creating a closed faith-based village. The village was originally named Salzburg. At the time of its founding in 1759, Emmaus was one of four leading Moravian communities in the Thirteen Colonies; Bethlehem, Lititz, and Nazareth, each in Pennsylvania, were the three others.

Two years later, in 1761, Moravian Bishop August Gottlieb Spangenberg announced the town's new name would be Emmaus, saying "Now here we build a village small; toward its completion we give all. Here, too, our hearts within shall flame; Emmaus then shall be its name." For approximately 100 years, until the mid-19th century, Emmaus was a closed community of the Moravian Church. Emmaus was named for the Biblical village of Emmaus, where, according to the Bible's Gospel of Luke, Jesus was seen by his disciples Luke and Cleopas in what is known as his Road to Emmaus appearance following his crucifixion and resurrection.

Three historic Emmaus residential structures built during the 18th and early 19th centuries, each still standing, have been added to the National Register of Historic Places. Shelter House, constructed in 1734 by Pennsylvania Dutch settlers, is the oldest building structure in Emmaus and the oldest continuously occupied structure in the Lehigh Valley. The 1803 House was built in 1803 in Emmaus by Revolutionary patriot militia member Jacob Ehrenhardt, Jr., son of one of the founders of Emmaus. Kemmerer House, built between 1840 and 1950, is a farmstead house in Emmaus.

=== 19th century ===
From its founding in 1759 until 1830, the settlement's name was spelled "Emmaus." From 1830 until 1938, however, the community used the Pennsylvania Dutch spelling of the name, "Emaus," with a macron line above the "m" to indicate a double letter. As English began emerging as the prevalent language in Pennsylvania, however, the line often was often omitted, leading to confusion about the correct spelling. In 1938, the local Rotary Club circulated petitions in support of changing the spelling to "Emmaus," and its spelling was changed to match the English version of the Bible's King James Version. Despite the 1938 spelling change, a major borough thoroughfare, Emaus Avenue, retains the pre-1938 spelling.

Emmaus and the metropolitan Allentown area contributed considerable numbers of volunteers to the Union army during the American Civil War. Volunteers from the region comprised roughly 70 percent of the 47th Pennsylvania Infantry Regiment, which mobilized after the fall of Fort Sumter to Confederate forces in April 1861, and engaged Confederate forces in the Lower seaboard theater in southern states through the Civil War's conclusion. On June 7, 1930, in recognition of the 47th Regiment's contributions to the preservation of the Union and Emmaus veterans who later served in the Spanish–American War and World War II, Emmaus erected the Emaus Honor Roll, using the borough's initial spelling, in a mini-park between 3rd and 4th Streets in their honor.

Iron ore was discovered in and near Emmaus in the 19th century. Beginning in 1850, the Donaldson Iron Company in Emmaus mined and processed iron ore and manufactured cast iron pipes and other iron-related products. In 1859, Reading Company constructed railroad lines through Emmaus, which are still in operation. The same year, the town was incorporated as a borough. In 1869, the town's first blast furnace opened. Iron ore production fueled the town's growth through the second half of the 19th century and early 20th century. During the 19th century, Emmaus was also a center of silk and cigar manufacturing.

=== 20th and 21st centuries ===
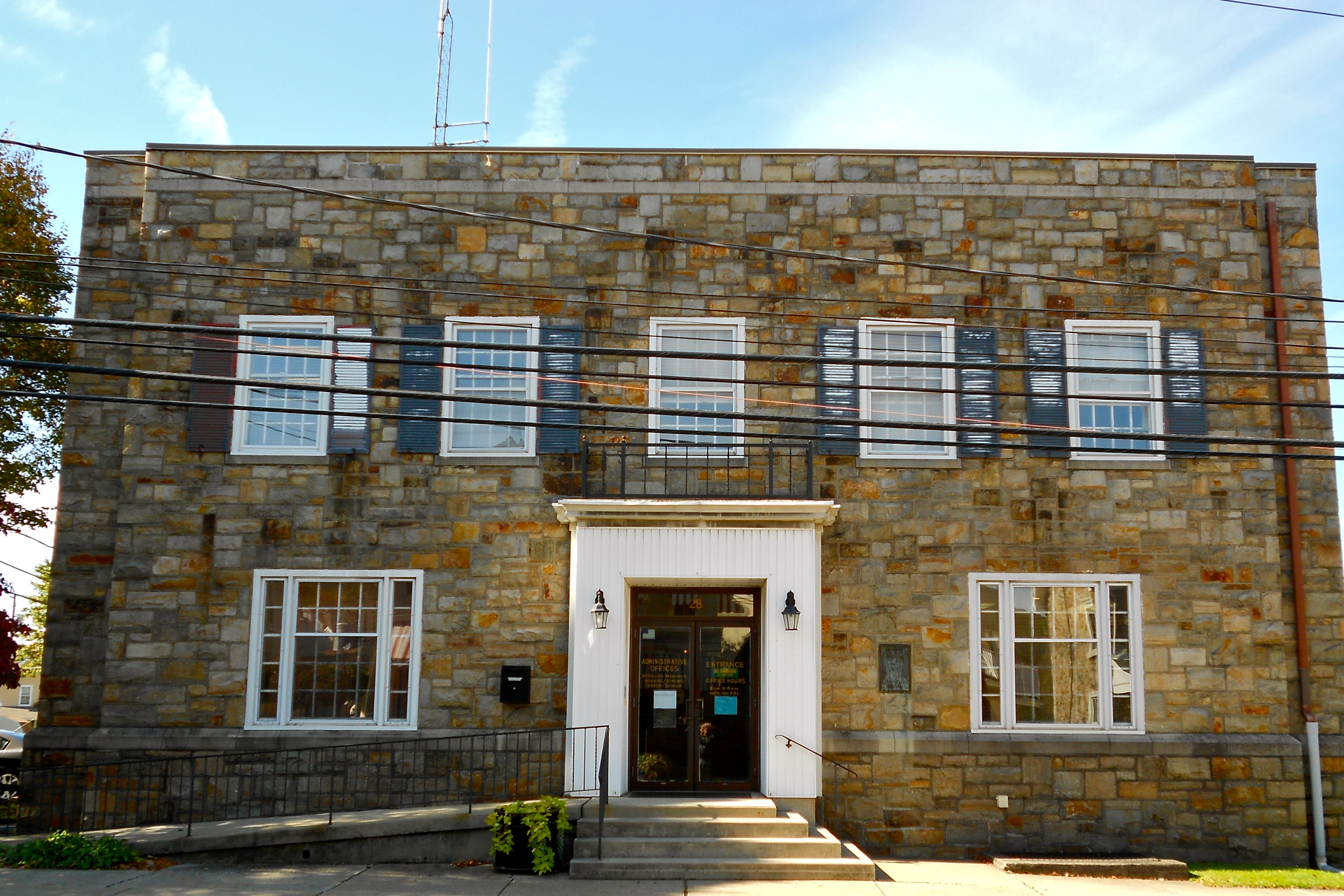
Emmaus Borough Hall in October 2012

In 1940, public census statistics showed that 6,731 people lived in Emmaus. The population of the borough has since nearly doubled to 11,467 as of the 2020 census. Housing construction has reached the borough line in all directions so significant continued population growth in the borough is unlikely. Outside the borough line, however, the local population continues to grow, especially in neighboring Lower Macungie Township. Consequently, growth in the Emmaus ZIP Code continues to expand but not within its borough limits.

== Geography ==
According to the U.S. Census Bureau, the borough has a total area of 2.9 square miles (7.5 km^{2}), all land, though part of Little Lehigh Creek, a tributary of the Lehigh River, flows just outside the Emmaus border with Salisbury Township. Emmaus borders South Mountain, a large Appalachian mountain range. The town's elevation is 436 feet (133 m) above sea level. Emmaus is located at approximately 40°32′13″N 75°29′45″W. It has a hot-summer humid continental climate (Köppen: Dfa) and is in hardiness zone 6b. Average monthly temperatures in the downtown vicinity range from 28.9 °F (−1.7 °C) in January to 73.5 °F (23.1 °C) in July.

== Demographics ==
Historical population
Census	Pop.	Note	%±
1860	381		—
1870	477		25.2%
1880	847		77.6%
1890	883		4.3%
1900	1,488		68.5%
1910	3,501		135.3%
1920	4,370		24.8%
1930	6,419		46.9%
1940	6,731		4.9%
1950	7,780		15.6%
1960	10,262		31.9%
1970	11,511		12.2%
1980	11,001		−4.4%
1990	11,157		1.4%
2000	11,313		1.4%
2010	11,211		−0.9%
2020	11,652		3.9%

=== 2020 census ===
As of the 2020 census, Emmaus had a population of 11,652. The median age was 40.7 years. 20.1% of residents were under the age of 18, and 17.9% were 65 years of age or older. For every 100 females, there were 92.7 males, and for every 100 females age 18 and over, there were 89.4 males.

99.9% of residents lived in urban areas, while 0.1% lived in rural areas.

There were 5,089 households in Emmaus, of which 26.9% had children under the age of 18 living in them. Of all households, 42.8% were married-couple households, 17.7% were households with a male householder and no spouse or partner present, and 30.0% were households with a female householder and no spouse or partner present. About 32.0% of all households were made up of individuals, and 13.3% had someone living alone who was 65 years of age or older.

There were 5,306 housing units, of which 4.1% were vacant. The homeowner vacancy rate was 1.2% and the rental vacancy rate was 4.7%.

Racial composition as of the 2020 census
Race	Number	Percentage
White	9,756	83.7%
Black or African American	390	3.3%
American Indian and Alaska Native	27	0.2%
Asian	212	1.8%
Native Hawaiian and Other Pacific Islander	0	0.0%
Some other race	441	3.8%
Two or more races	826	7.1%
Hispanic or Latino (of any race)	1,182	10.1%

=== 2000 census ===
As of the 2000 census, there were 11,313 people, 4,985 households, and 3,155 families residing in the borough. The population density was 3,918.8 inhabitants per square mile (1,513.1/km^{2}). There were 5,186 housing units at an average density of 1,796.4 per square mile (693.6/km^{2}). The racial makeup of the borough was 95.89% White, 0.70% African American, 0.06% Native American, 1.81% Asian, 0.03% Pacific Islander, 0.88% from other races, and 0.63% from two or more races. Hispanic and Latinos of any race were 1.51% of the population.

Among the borough's 4,985 households, 26.4% had children under the age of 18 living with them, 50.9% were married couples living together, 9.1% had a female householder with no husband present, and 36.7% were non-families. 31.5% of all households were made up of individuals, and 13.6% had someone living alone who was 65 years of age or older. The average household size was 2.26 and the average family size was 2.85.

In the borough, the population was spread out, with 21.2% under the age of 18, 6.6% from 18 to 24, 31.0% from 25 to 44, 22.1% from 45 to 64, and 19.1% who were 65 years of age or older. The median age was 40 years. For every 100 females, there are 91.7 males. For every 100 females age 18 and over, there were 88.8 males. Median income for a household in the borough was $55,139, whereas the estimated median household for the state of Pennsylvania is $52,007, and median income for a family was $54,120. Males had a median income of $38,659 versus $25,331 for females. Per capita income for the borough was $23,245. About 2.2% of families and 3.5% of the population were below the poverty line, including 1.2% of those under age 18 and 7.9% of those age 65 or over.

== Industry and commerce ==
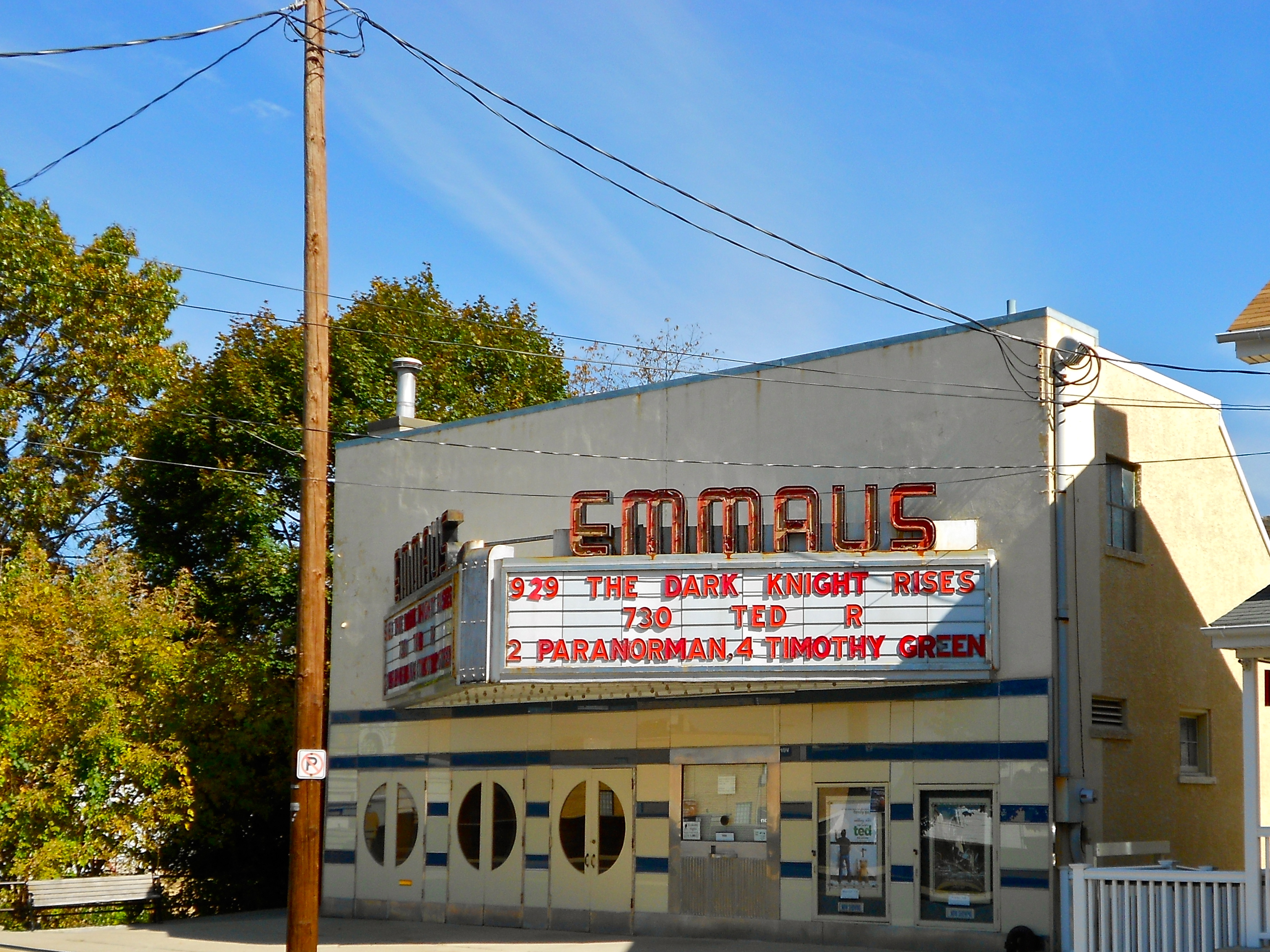
The historic Emmaus Theatre on S. 4th Street in Emmaus in October 2012

Buckeye Pipe Line, a U.S. petroleum distributor, is headquartered locally, between Emmaus and Macungie. The largest major shopping mall in the Emmaus area is South Mall, located on Lehigh Street on Emmaus' border with Salisbury Township and Allentown. South Mall is one of four major shopping malls in Allentown and its immediate suburbs.

Yocco's Hot Dogs, the Lehigh Valley-based fast food establishment known for their regionally-famous hot dogs and cheesesteaks, maintains its corporate headquarters on East Minor Street in Emmaus with four locations in the Lehigh Valley.

The Emmaus Arts Commission hosts art and film events in Emmaus, including "Art in the Garden," "Emmaus Art Walk," the "Student Horror Film Festival," and others. Each October, Emmaus also hosts an annual Halloween parade, one of the largest in the Lehigh Valley, combined with a 5K Race, which is held just before the parade's start and is a major fundraiser for the Parade Committee and the Parks and Recreation Commission.

Emmaus was the former headquarters of Rodale, Inc., one of the world's largest publishers of health-related books and magazines, including Men's Health, Prevention, Runner's World, and Women's Health magazines. In 2018, the company was acquired by Hearst and local offices were moved to nearby Easton.

== Education ==
Emmaus is served educationally by the East Penn School District, a public school district that accommodates kindergarten through 12th grade.

The district operates a high school, Emmaus High School located in Emmaus (for grades nine through 12), two middle schools, Eyer Middle School and Lower Macungie Middle School (both located in Macungie for grades six through eight), seven public elementary schools (Alburtis Elementary School, Jefferson Elementary School, Lincoln Elementary School, Macungie Elementary School, Shoemaker Elementary School, Wescosville Elementary School, and Willow Lane Elementary School), and one public elementary charter school (Seven Generations Charter School, located in Emmaus).

== Transportation ==
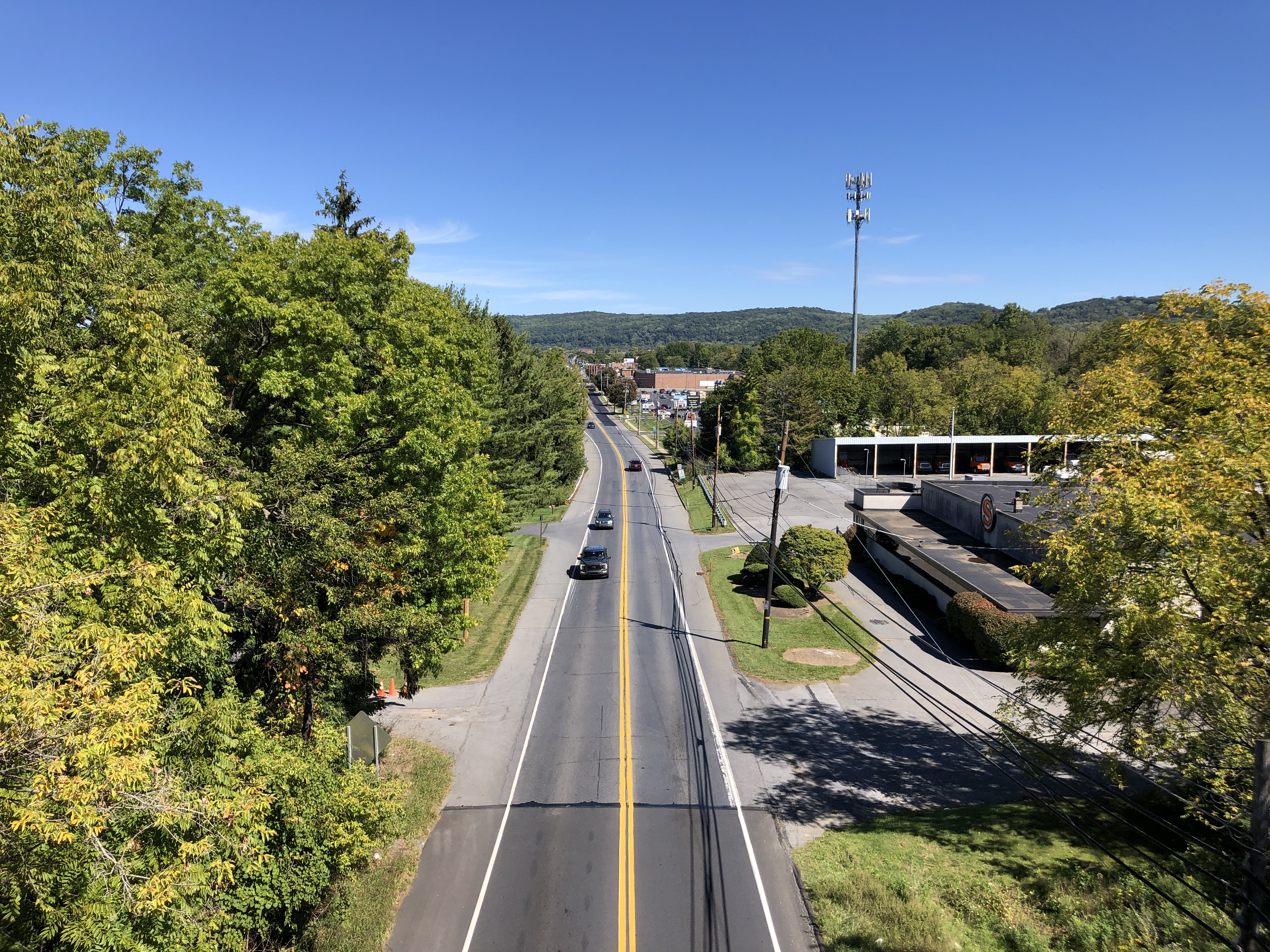
PA Route 29 North in Emmaus in September 2022

As of 2022, there were 43.64 miles (70.23 km) of public roads in Emmaus, of which 0.60 miles (0.97 km) were maintained by the Pennsylvania Turnpike Commission (PTC), 5.48 miles (8.82 km) were maintained by the Pennsylvania Department of Transportation (PennDOT) and 37.56 miles (60.45 km) were maintained by the borough.

Interstate 476, the most prominent highway passing through Emmaus, traverses the western portion of the borough along the Pennsylvania Turnpike's Northeast Extension. However, the nearest interchange is two townships away in South Whitehall Township. I-476 heads north to Wyoming Valley and south to Plymouth Meeting near Philadelphia. Pennsylvania Route 29 provides direct access to Emmaus, entering the borough from the southwest via Chestnut Street and exiting to the northwest via Cedar Crest Boulevard. Lehigh Street, the other thoroughfare serving the borough, is located on the borough's east-side. Both highways have junctions with I-78, which spans from Lebanon County in the west to the Holland Tunnel and Lower Manhattan in the east. LANta provides bus service to and from Emmaus on its Route 104 service through Allentown to and from the Lehigh Valley Mall in Whitehall Township.

== Notable people ==
- Charles Bierbauer, former CNN correspondent
- Margaret W. "Hap" Brennecke, former NASA metallurgist
- Howard J. Buss, composer and music publisher
- Aaron Gray, former professional basketball player, Chicago Bulls, Detroit Pistons, New Orleans Hornets, and Sacramento Kings
- Keith Jarrett, jazz pianist
- Michael Johns, health care executive and former White House presidential speechwriter
- K. C. Keeler, head football coach, Temple University
- Griffin Lake, sport shooter for the United states national rifle team
- Trina Radke, U.S. swimming team, 1988 Summer Olympics
- J. I. Rodale, founder, Rodale, Inc.
- Robert Rodale, former publisher, Rodale, Inc.
- Cindy Werley, U.S. field hockey team, 1996 Summer Olympics
