= East Penn School District =

School district in Pennsylvania

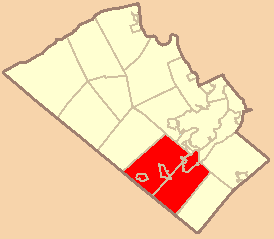
- Location of East Penn School District in Lehigh County, Pennsylvania

Address
- 800 Pine Street Emmaus, Pennsylvania, 18049; United States
- Coordinates: 40.536390°N 75.506690°W

District information
- Type: Public
- Established: 1952; 74 years ago
- Schools: 10, including Emmaus High School
- Budget: $173.53 million
- NCES District ID: 4208550

Students and staff
- Students: 7,851 (2024-25)
- Teachers: 579.99 (on an FTE basis)
- Student–teacher ratio: 13.54
- Athletic conference: Eastern Pennsylvania Conference
- District mascot: Green Hornets
- Colors: Green and Gold

Other information
- Website: www.eastpennsd.org

East Penn School District (EPSD) is a large public school district in Lehigh County, Pennsylvania, in the Lehigh Valley region of eastern Pennsylvania. Established in 1952, it was initially known as the East Penn Union School District (EPUSD).

East Penn School District serves students from Emmaus, Lower Macungie Township, Macungie, Upper Milford Township, and Alburtis, all located in the Lehigh Valley, the third-largest metropolitan region of Pennsylvania.

The district operates Emmaus High School in Emmaus for grades nine through 12, two public middle schools (Eyer Middle School and Lower Macungie Middle School, both located in Lower Macungie Township) for grades six through eight, seven public elementary schools (located in Alburtis, Emmaus, Macungie, and Wescosville) for kindergarten through fifth grade, and one public elementary charter school (Seven Generations Charter School, located in Emmaus).

As of the 2024–25 school year, the school district had a total student enrollment of 7,851 students between all ten of its schools, according to National Center for Education Statistics data. The district employs 579.99 teachers with 90% of teachers holding a master's degree or higher.

== Academics ==
Among its 2024 alumni, 70% of Emmaus High School graduates attended four-year colleges or universities and 12% attended two-year colleges for a total of 82% pursuing higher education following high school graduation.

East Penn School District has one of the most developed advanced placement programs in the Lehigh Valley, offering 26 advanced placement courses as of the 2023-24 school year. Emmaus High School also holds the record for the most championships in Scholastic Scrimmage, an academic quiz show competition of Pennsylvania high schools broadcast on the state's PBS affiliates.

== Athletics ==
Emmaus High School competes athletically in the Eastern Pennsylvania Conference, which has produced numerous professional and Olympic athletes, including players who have gone on to NFL and NBA careers. The school fields teams in all Eastern Pennsylvania Conference sports.

Emmaus High School, founded in 1955, has won Eastern Pennsylvania Conference (or its predecessor, the Lehigh Valley Conference) championships at least once in each of the conference's sports. Emmaus High School holds the Eastern Pennsylvania Conference record for the most Pennsylvania state championships in all sports (13 since 2002) and is second in overall Eastern Pennsylvania Conference championships behind Parkland High School.

== Schools ==
=== High school ===
- Emmaus High School (Emmaus)

=== Middle schools ===
- Eyer Middle School (Macungie)
- Lower Macungie Middle School (Macungie)

=== Elementary school ===
- Alburtis Elementary School (Alburtis)
- Jefferson Elementary School (Emmaus)
- Lincoln Elementary School (Emmaus)
- Macungie Elementary School (Macungie)
- Shoemaker Elementary School (Macungie)
- Wescosville Elementary School (Wescosville)
- Willow Lane Elementary School (Macungie)

=== Elementary charter school ===
- Seven Generations Charter School (Emmaus)

== Notable alumni ==
- Charles Bierbauer, former CNN correspondent
- Howard J. Buss, composer and music publisher
- Keith Dorney, former professional football player, Detroit Lions
- Aaron Gray, former professional basketball player, Chicago Bulls, New Orleans Hornets, Sacramento Kings and Toronto Raptors
- Todd Howard, game director, Fallout 3, Oblivion, Skyrim
- Michael Johns, health care executive and former White House presidential speechwriter
- Marty Nothstein, 2000 Olympic Games gold medal winner, track cycling
- Nicole Reinhart, two-time Pan American Games gold-medal winner, track cycling
- Cindy Werley, 1996 Olympian, U.S. field hockey team
- Kyzir White, professional football player, San Francisco 49ers
