= Emmaus High School =

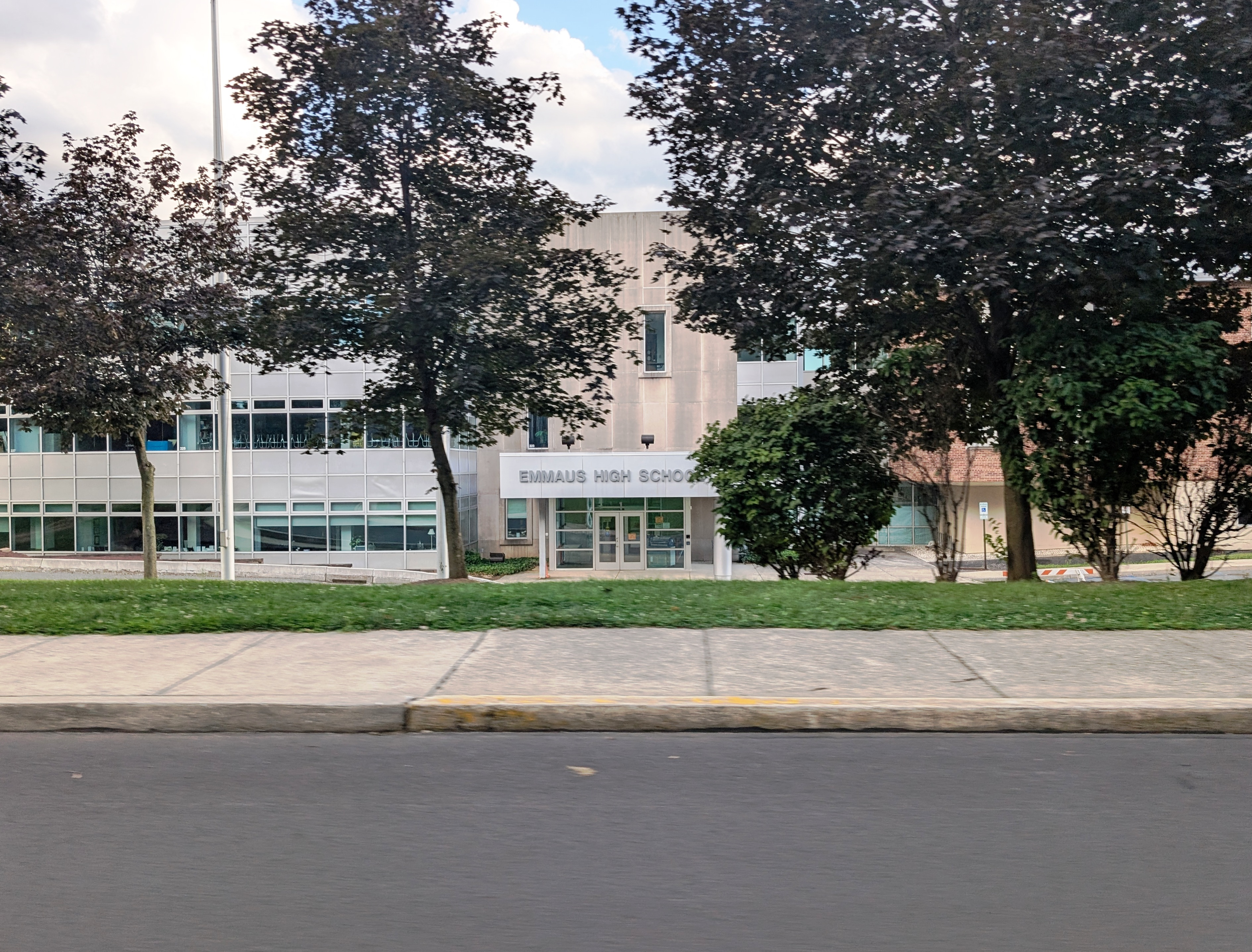
- Emmaus High School in July 2025

Location
- 500 Macungie Avenue; Emmaus, Pennsylvania 18049; United States; 40.533870°N 75.506600°W

Information
- Type: Public high school
- Established: 1955; 71 years ago
- School district: East Penn School District
- NCES School ID: 420855002809
- Principal: Beth Guarriello
- Faculty: 181.2 (on an FTE basis)
- Grades: 9th–12th
- Enrollment: 2,842 (2024–25)
- Student to teacher ratio: 15.68
- Campus type: Suburb: Large
- Colors: Green and gold
- Athletics conference: Eastern Pennsylvania Conference
- Mascot: Green Hornets
- Rival: Parkland High School
- Newspaper: The Stinger
- Website: www.eastpennsd.org/ehs/

Emmaus High School (EHS) is a large public high school located in Emmaus, Pennsylvania. The school serves grades 9–12 in Pennsylvania's East Penn School District in the Lehigh Valley region of eastern Pennsylvania.

Emmaus High School is located immediately off Cedar Crest Boulevard, at 500 Macungie Avenue in Emmaus, a borough 5 miles (8.0 km) south of Allentown, Pennsylvania.

== Student population ==
As of the 2024-25 school year, Emmaus High School had a student enrollment of 2,842 students and 181.2 classroom teachers on an FTE basis for a student–teacher ratio of 15.68, according to National Center for Education Statistics data. There were 861 students eligible for free lunch and 84 eligible for reduced cost lunch.

Emmaus High School serves students grades nine through 12 from Emmaus, Lower Macungie Township, Macungie, Upper Milford Township, and Alburtis, all located in the Lehigh Valley, the third-largest metropolitan region of Pennsylvania.

The school ranks among the top Lehigh Valley public high schools in its percentage of graduating students who pursue post-secondary education. Among its Class of 2024, 82 percent of Emmaus High School graduates entered colleges, universities, or other post-graduate education. The school also maintains a program for academically gifted students, which includes advanced classes and a mentorship program. Noting the academic quality of Emmaus High School, Money magazine named Emmaus one of the nation's "Top 100" places to live in 2007 and again in 2009.

Two middle schools (Eyer Middle School and Lower Macungie Middle School), both located in Macungie, serve grades six through eight and feed into Emmaus High School. Seven elementary schools (Alburtis, Wescosville, Lincoln, Jefferson, Macungie, Shoemaker, and Willow Lane) and one elementary charter school (Seven Generations Charter School) feed into the two middle schools and then Emmaus High School.

== History ==
=== 19th century ===
What today is the East Penn School District was founded in the 1880s as the Emaus School District, initially using the Pennsylvania Dutch spelling named for the Biblical village of Emmaus, where, according to the Bible's Gospel of Luke, Jesus was seen by his disciples Luke and Cleopas in what is known as his Road to Emmaus appearance following his crucifixion and resurrection.

Upon its founding in the 1880s, Emaus School District began offering high school classes, providing education up to tenth grade in one of the rooms of a four-room school building on East Main Street in Emmaus. The first graduating class on record was the Emaus High School class of 1890 with two graduates. The following year, in 1891, the high school grades were moved to the Central Building on Ridge Street in Emmaus.

=== 20th century ===
In 1915, Emaus High School obtained its own home, moving into a new building on North Street between Fifth and Sixth Streets in Emmaus. While the building was designated the Jefferson Building, yearbooks of the era identify the school as Emaus High School. The high school was then made up of tenth-grade (juniors), eleventh-grade (middlers), and twelfth-grade (seniors). The yearbook of the class of 1916 features photos of 18 graduates, evenly divided between boys and girls.

In 1931, the school had 45 graduates, and its yearbook from that year lists a band, chorus, orchestra (55 student members), 16 different clubs, and teams for football, basketball (boys and girls), and debate. Emaus High School's main football rival at this time was East Greenville High School, now Upper Perkiomen High School, which met Emmaus annually on Thanksgiving Day in what was referred to as the "Turkey Day" game. In the 1930s, the Emaus High School football field was located roughly a mile from the high school at the site of the present-day recreational Fourth Street Field in Emmaus.

During the 1930s and 1940s, the boroughs of Macungie and Alburtis contracted with Emaus district to send their high school students to Emaus High School. There were no school buses, and out-of-borough students commuted to and from the high school by Reading Railroad passenger train service at the Emaus train station. Located on Jubilee Street, the station was constructed in the late 19th century, decommissioned, and destroyed by fire on March 1, 1993.

In 1938, Emaus abandoned the Pennsylvania Dutch spelling of its name in favor of the town's current spelling, and East Penn School District and the high school followed suit. With Emmaus High School's population growing rapidly, the Jefferson Building could no longer accommodate the growing school's needs. The boroughs of Emmaus, Macungie, and Alburtis, and the townships of Lower Macungie and Upper Milford merged their school districts into what was then called the East Penn Union School District and is now East Penn School District. The unified district combined their efforts and resources to expand Emmaus High School, which was constructed at the school's current location at 500 Macungie Avenue in Emmaus.

In 1955, the first sections of the new Emmaus High School opened. The new building included an auditorium and gymnasium, which far surpassed those of the old building, and included science labs, language labs, and an indoor swimming pool. After the high school moved out of the Jefferson Building, that building was briefly used as Emmaus Junior High School until a seventh and eighth grade wing was added to the new high school building around 1960, making Emmaus High School a six-year school with a single principal but separate assistant principals for its high school and junior high school grades. In 1965, the Emmaus Junior High School building, with its own faculty and administration, opened on the north side of the high school building to serve grades seven through nine. The Jefferson Building, in turn, was designated as one of several East Penn School District elementary schools.

By the early 1960s, the number of sports teams at Emmaus High School expanded to include baseball, football, and wrestling for boys, cross country, field hockey, and softball for girls, and basketball, golf, rifle, swimming, and track and field for both boys and girls. A class play was presented annually; in 1969, Emmaus High School produced its first musical, Bye Bye Birdie.

By 1998, the school's population had grown significantly due to an influx of residents predominantly from New Jersey, New York City, and Philadelphia, and Emmaus High School expanded again, taking over the junior high school building, adding additional space, and using the whole complex to house grades nine through twelve. The Jefferson Building, the first dedicated home of Emmaus High School, was subsequently decommissioned, demolished in 1999, and replaced by Jefferson Elementary School, one of seven current elementary schools in the district.

=== 21st century ===
In 2005, a second major expansion of Emmaus High School was completed.

In October 2015, Emmaus High School was placed on lockdown amid rumors of potential gun violence.

In November 2018, a torrential rainstorm flooded the school, causing administrators to cancel five days of classes. The main office, auxiliary gym, wrestling room, 40 classrooms, and adjacent areas were impacted by stormwater. Financial aid and assistance with clean up were provided by East Penn School District.

On December 17, 2021, Emmaus High School was placed under a cautionary lockdown due to a potential external threat after various threats were made to schools across the country. Several threats were made by an Emmaus High School freshman student against the school's assistant principals and another student. After almost two hours in cautionary lockdown, students were dismissed in small groups under police supervision. The suspect, a 14-year-old female Emmaus High School student, was arrested the following day, on December 18, and charged with making terrorist threats.

== Academics ==
Emmaus High School ranks in the top academic tier of Pennsylvania public high schools based on state testing results. In the 2008 Pennsylvania System of State Assessments, Emmaus High School ranked in the top five percent of all public high schools in the state in writing, the top 20 percent in reading, and the top 25 percent in mathematics. In 2007, the mean SAT score for Emmaus High School students was 1580. In 2013, Emmaus High School was named the top academically performing high school in Lehigh County, according to data released by the Pennsylvania Department of Education. As of 2022, 90% of East Penn School District teachers hold a master's degree or higher.

The school's academic team has made several appearances at the national level, appearing three consecutive years (2003, 2004, and 2005) in the Panasonic Academic Challenge at Disney World and placing fifth nationally in the competition in 2003. In 2015 and 2018, the school's academic team qualified for participation in the National Academic Quiz Tournaments in Atlanta. Emmaus High School also holds the record for the most wins of any high school in Pennsylvania's Scholastic Scrimmage contest, an advanced academic quiz game televised on Pennsylvania PBS affiliates.

== Athletics ==
Emmaus High School competes athletically in the Eastern Pennsylvania Conference (EPC) of the Pennsylvania Interscholastic Athletic Association (PIAA), one of the premier high school athletic divisions in the nation, and fields teams at the highest level of PIAA athletic competition in all sports.

Since 1955, Emmaus has won EPC championships at least once in every one of the conference's sports, and several of its graduates have gone on to professional and Olympic-level athletics, including the NFL and NBA. Among the Emmaus High School Class of 2007, 26 Emmaus High School athletes signed letters of intent for full NCAA athletic scholarships.

Emmaus holds the record for the most Pennsylvania state championships in all sports (13 since 2002) among all EPC schools and has the second-most EPC conference championships in all sports behind Parkland High School. In 2017, Adidas signed a four-year deal for exclusive sponsorship of Emmaus High School's athletic teams. In 2019, the ranking and review site Niche ranked Emmaus High School the 29th-best public school in Pennsylvania for athletics. Emmaus holds the record for the most recorded EPC championships in eight conference sports: baseball, boys lacrosse, boys soccer, boys swimming, girls field hockey, girls soccer, girls swimming, and golf.

Emmaus High School's mascot is the "Green Hornet." Entrances to the Emmaus High School campus prominently feature green and gold billboards and flags stating "Home of the Hornets" in the school's colors of green and gold.

=== Basketball ===
Aaron Gray, an alumnus of Emmaus High School's basketball program, went on to a seven-year NBA career from 2007 through 2014, playing for the Chicago Bulls, New Orleans Hornets, Sacramento Kings, and Toronto Raptors and subsequently for three seasons as an NBA coach with the Detroit Pistons from 2015 through 2018.

=== Boys soccer ===
Emmaus High School boys soccer played for the EPC championship in eleven consecutive seasons between 2011 and 2021, winning five district titles during this period.

=== Boys swimming and diving ===
In March 2023, Emmaus High School won its 16th consecutive PIAA District 11 boys swimming and diving championship.

=== Fitness ===
Emmaus High School's Marine Corps national physical fitness team has repeatedly been among the nation's best. In 2006, its boys and girls team placed second in the Pennsylvania state competition. In 2015, its girls fitness team placed first and its boys fitness team placed second in the national high school physical fitness championships.

=== Football ===
The Emmaus football team was co-champion of the Eastern Pennsylvania Conference (EPC) in 1981. In 2008, Emmaus running back C.J. Billera broke school football records for most all-time touchdowns and career scoring. In 2010, for the first time since the 1981 season, Emmaus won Pennsylvania's Class 4A EPC championship in football. During the 2010 season, Emmaus senior tailback Joe Williams broke three school football records: most yards in a single game (282), most touchdowns in a single game (six), and most points in a single game (36). In 2016, the Emmaus football team won the East Penn Conference South division championship.

In February 2020, East Penn School District approved $1.7 million in spending to construct a new AstroTurf playing surface and end zone lettering on the Emmaus High School football field, located on the school campus. Under a 10-year promotional contract with Lehigh Valley Health Network, the school district is recouping $1.45 million in promotional fees associated with the field upgrades.

Multiple Emmaus High School football players have gone on to NFL careers.

=== Girls field hockey ===
Emmaus High School girls field hockey team has consistently ranked among the best in the nation for decades. Emmaus has won the Pennsylvania state championship in girls field hockey 13 times in the program's history. As of 2022, Emmaus High School has won the PIAA District 11 girls field hockey championship in 34 consecutive seasons. In 2016, the national sports website topofthecircle.com ranked Emmaus the best girls field hockey team in the nation for the fourth time in the program's history. In 2010, The Morning Call called the program "an organized, multifaceted machine." In September 2015, Emmaus High School field hockey coach Sue Butz-Stavin set the national high school record for most victories by a girls field hockey coach when she recorded her 840th victory. In the 2021 season, she recorded her 1000th win.

=== Ice hockey ===
Emmaus High School is one of eleven Lehigh Valley-area high schools with an ice hockey team; the team is a member of the Lehigh Valley Scholastic Ice Hockey League. The team has won the LVSHL district championship twice.

=== Rifle ===
In the 2016-2017 winter sport season, the Emmaus rifle team went undefeated, capturing the regular season championship, defeating top rival East Stroudsburg High School South to win the playoff championship, and placing second in Pennsylvania states for the season.

=== Other sports ===
Emmaus High School's girls swimming and diving team has proven to be one of the best in the state, winning Pennsylvania state championships in six years (2000, 2004, 2005, 2007, 2008, and 2009). Its boys swimming and diving team has consistently been one of the top teams in the state, dating back to the 1970s, winning Pennsylvania state championships in both 2006 and 2007 and the District 11 AAA championship in nine consecutive seasons between 2007 and 2015.

Emmaus High School has won Pennsylvania state championships in girls soccer (1997), girls softball (2000), and girls cross country (2007, 2008, and 2009). In 2008, Emmaus High School's boys volleyball team won the EPC championship and advanced to the Pennsylvania state tournament. In 2012, Emmaus High School's wrestling team took first place in the United States Military Duels held in South Carolina.

== Activities ==
=== Computer programming team ===
In May 2017, Emmaus High School's computer programming team won the American Computer Science League Invitational All-Star contest, a global tournament of the best high school computer programming teams from around the world held in Thousand Oaks, California.

=== Music and the arts ===
In December 2007, Emmaus' men's a cappella group, known as Fermata Nowhere, landed a brief stint on NBC's Clash of the Choirs, performing "Jingle Bells". In April 2015, Emmaus High School's chorale group performed at St. Peter's Basilica in Vatican City, and has since performed at other locations in Europe. In December of 2023 and 2025, they performed at Allentown Symphony Hall and in May of 2025 they performed at Carnegie Hall. Their theatre department has received many awards at the local area's annual Freddy Awards, specifically their 2023 production of Fiddler on the Roof, taking home a historic 7 awards.

=== School newspaper ===
Emmaus High School's official student newspaper is The Stinger, a reference to the hornet, the school's mascot. The newspaper is produced by a staff of students who report, photograph, and write all its content. The newspaper was founded in 1921 as E-Hive, a name it retained until 1974 when it was changed to The Stinger. In the 2021-22 school year, The Stinger celebrated its 100th anniversary of continuous publication. The Stinger and its staff have won countless national and state-level awards since its 1921 founding. In 2025, The Stinger placed fifth in the nation in the National Scholastic Press Association (NSPA) "Best of Show" contest.

The newspaper's print edition typically includes several sections related to Emmaus High School, including Emmaus High School sports, faculty, coach, and student interviews, editorials, local popular culture, and satire and jokes related to school news and events. In most issues, the final page of The Stinger is dedicated to student-drawn comics, which also usually deal with student-related themes. The Stinger is known to tackle controversial topics, especially Emmaus High School's problems with student fights, truancy, and widespread recreational drug use.

In 1993, former Superintendent Alrita Morgan censored an editorial, which was seen as critical of then East Penn School District board member Mary Lou Stefanko.

Editors from The Stinger have covered many notable events, including former president Joe Biden's visit to Emmaus in January 2024, a story that won first place in General News in the Keystone Student News Media Contest. In September 2024, three staff members covered governor Josh Shapiro's visit to Emmaus High School for a ceremonial signing of the historic Pennsylvania education budget.

== Notable alumni ==
- Charles Bierbauer, former television journalist, CNN
- Howard J. Buss, composer and music publisher
- Dane DeHaan, television and film actor (attended)
- Keith Dorney, former professional football player, Detroit Lions
- Aaron Gray, former professional basketball player, Chicago Bulls, New Orleans Hornets, Sacramento Kings, and Toronto Raptors
- Todd Howard, executive producer and video game director, Bethesda Softworks
- Keith Jarrett, jazz and classical music pianist and composer
- Michael Johns, healthcare executive and former White House presidential speechwriter
- K. C. Keeler, head football coach, Temple University
- Griffin Lake, sports shooter for the United states national rifle team
- Mario Landino, college football player, Indiana University
- Joe Milinichik, former professional football player, Detroit Lions, Los Angeles Rams, and San Diego Chargers
- Marty Nothstein, former 2000 Summer Olympics gold-medal winner, track cycling
- Heather Parry, film producer and former MTV video producer
- Nicole Reinhart, former professional cyclist and two-time Pan American Games gold-medal winner
- Cindy Werley, former 1996 Summer Olympics women's field hockey player
- Kevin White, former professional football player, Chicago Bears, New Orleans Saints, and San Francisco 49ers
- Kyzir White, professional football player, San Francisco 49ers

== See also ==
- East Penn School District
