= Scrapper Farrell =

American football player (1915–1986)

Profile
- Positions: Halfback, fullback, quarterback

Personal information
- Born: July 12, 1915; Catasauqua, Pennsylvania, U.S.
- Died: April 16, 1986 (aged 70); Lebanon, Pennsylvania, U.S.
- Listed height: 5 ft 9 in (1.75 m)
- Listed weight: 204 lb (93 kg)

Career information
- High school: Catasauqua (PA)
- College: Muhlenberg

Career history
- Wilmington Clippers (1937); Pittsburgh Pirates (1938); Brooklyn Dodgers (1938–1939); Wilmington Clippers (1939-1941)

Career NFL statistics
- Games: 14
- Rushing yards: 425
- Points scored: 18
- Stats at Pro Football Reference

Edward Francis "Scrapper" Farrell (July 12, 1915 – April 16, 1986) was an American football quarterback, halfback, fullback, and coach. He played in the National Football League (NFL) for the Pittsburgh Pirates (1938) and Brooklyn Dodgers (1938–1939). He also played college football for the Muhlenberg Mules from 1933 to 1936.

== Early life ==
Farrell was born in 1915 in Catasauqua, Pennsylvania. He attended Catasauqua High School. He later attended Muhlenberg College where he broke numerous football records and became "Muhlenberg's greatest back."

== Professional football ==
Farrell played professional football for five years from 1937 to 1941. He began with the Wilmington Clippers of the American Association in 1937 and then joined the Pittsburgh Pirates (NFL) and Brooklyn Dodgers (NFL) in 1938 and 1939. He was sold by Pittsburgh to Brooklyn on October 9, 1938, splitting the 1938 season between the two teams. During the 1938 season, he rushed for 425 yards, sixth most in the NFL, and scored three touchdowns. He appeared in only two NFL games in 1939 and was then sold to the Wilmington Clippers. He played for the Clippers in 1939, 1940, and 1941.

== Later life ==
After his playing career ended, Farrell was a teacher in Lebanon, Pennsylvania, and was also an assistant football coach for several years. He also coached at Dunmore and Windber where his players included Frank Kush. He also served in the Army as a lieutenant during World War II and participated in the Bougainville campaign.

Farrell was married to Irene Danko Farrell. They had two sons (Edward F. Farrell III and Dennis M. Farrell) and two daughters (Catherine and Mary Pat). Farrell died in April 1986 at age 70 in Lebanon, Pennsylvania.
