= George Taylor (Pennsylvania politician) =

Founding Father of the United States (c. 1716 – 1781)

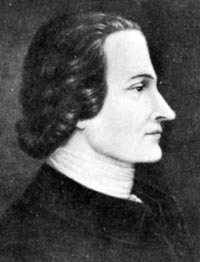

Member, Supreme Executive Council of Pennsylvania
- In office March 4, 1777 – November 8, 1777

Pennsylvania Delegate to the Continental Congress
- In office July 20, 1776 – February 17, 1777

Member, Pennsylvania Provincial Assembly
- In office 1763–1769
- In office 1775–1777

Personal details
- Born: 1716 Ireland (possibly Ulster)
- Died: February 23, 1781 (aged 64–65) Parsons-Taylor House, Easton, Pennsylvania, U.S.
- Resting place: Easton Cemetery, Easton
- Spouse: Ann Taylor Savage (m. 1743)
- Children: 7
- Profession: Ironmaster
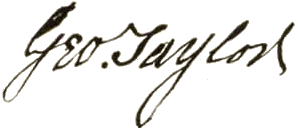
- Signature

George Taylor (c. 1716 – February 23, 1781) was an American ironmaster and politician who was a Founding Father of the United States and a signer of the United States Declaration of Independence as a representative of Pennsylvania. His former home, the George Taylor House in Catasauqua, Pennsylvania, was named a National Historic Landmark in 1971.

== Early life and education ==
Taylor was born in the North of Ireland (now Northern Ireland), possibly Ulster, in 1716. He emigrated to the American colonies at age 20, landing in Philadelphia in 1736.

According to early 18th century biographies of the signers of the Declaration of Independence, he is believed to have been the son of a Protestant clergyman. To pay for his passage, Taylor was indentured to Samuel Savage Jr., who was ironmaster at the French Creek Iron Works in Coventry in Chester County northwest of Philadelphia.

== Career ==
=== Iron worker ===
Taylor started as a laborer at the ironworks. In 1739, he was promoted to a clerk.

In 1738, Savage, his brother-in-law Samuel Nutt Jr., and his mother Anna Savage Nutt built Warwick Furnace, a cold blast, charcoal furnace to the west, which they named Warwick. Savage died in 1742, and the following year, Taylor married Savage's widow, Ann, whose maiden name was also Taylor. In 1745, under iron master John Potts, Taylor was made manager of the works, which consisted of the furnace and Coventry Forge. When Ann's son Samuel III reached legal age in 1752, the son assumed ownership of the mills by the terms of his father's will.

The Taylors continued to live at Warwick Furnace until 1755, when Taylor formed a partnership to lease the Durham Furnace in Upper Bucks County, north of Philadelphia. The ironworks, built in 1727, was started by a group of investors who were among Pennsylvania's wealthiest and most influential men, including James Logan, proprietor of the Pennsylvania colony for the Penn family, and William Allen, later the colony's chief justice and founder of Allentown, then called Northampton Town.

=== Political career ===
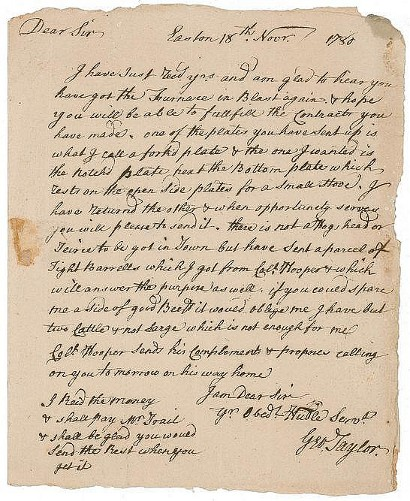
A letter signed by Taylor, dated November 1780, refers to business in his trade of ironmongery

Shortly after becoming ironmaster at Durham, Taylor entered public life for the first time, serving as a justice of the peace in Bucks County, Pennsylvania from 1757 to 1763. When the lease for the Durham mill expired, the Taylors relocated to Easton, the county seat of Northampton County, where they purchased a stone house near the center of town and built a stable nearby. Continuing his interest in public affairs, Taylor was commissioned as a justice of the peace in Northampton County and was elected to the Pennsylvania Provincial Assembly. He also helped build a new county courthouse in Easton's center square.

In 1767, Taylor purchased 331 acres (1.34 km^{2}) near Allentown at Biery's Port, which is now part of Catasauqua, Pennsylvania. The house was completed in 1768, but Taylor's wife Ann died shortly after the Taylors moved in. Taylor continued living there for the next several years and, for a time, leased half of the property for farming. In 1776, two years after moving back to Durham, he sold the estate. Two centuries later, on July 17, 1971, the George Taylor House was designated as a National Historical Landmark.

While still at Biery's Port, Taylor arranged another lease to operate the Durham ironworks in 1774. The ironworks had just been acquired by Joseph Galloway, a Philadelphia attorney and speaker of the Pennsylvania General Assembly (1766–1774). After failing to gain support in the First Continental Congress for his plan to avert a break with England, Galloway resigned as speaker and refused to attend the Second Continental Congress in 1775. Taylor, meanwhile, was re-elected to the Assembly in 1775 and attended the Provincial Convention on January 23. In July, as colonial forces prepared for war, he was commissioned as a colonel in the third battalion of the Pennsylvania militia.

Two weeks later, on August 2, Taylor secured a contract with Pennsylvania's Committee of Safety for cannon shot. On August 25, with a shipment of 258 round balls weighing from 18 to 32 pounds each, Durham Furnace became the first ironworks in Pennsylvania to supply munitions to the Continental Army.

=== Founding Father and signer of the Declaration of Independence ===
In 1776, the Continental Congress voted for independence on July 2 and adopted the Declaration of Independence two days later, on July 4. Before the vote for independence, five of Pennsylvania's delegates, all Loyalists, were forced to resign. On July 20, Taylor was among the replacements appointed by the Assembly. One of his first duties as a member of Congress was to affix his signature to the Declaration of Independence, which he did on August 2, along with most delegates. Of the 56 signers, he was one of only eight who were foreign born, the only one to have been indentured, and the only one to hold the position of ironmaster. Of the 56 signers of the Declaration, Taylor was one of the 41 who owned slaves.

=== Durham Furnace ===
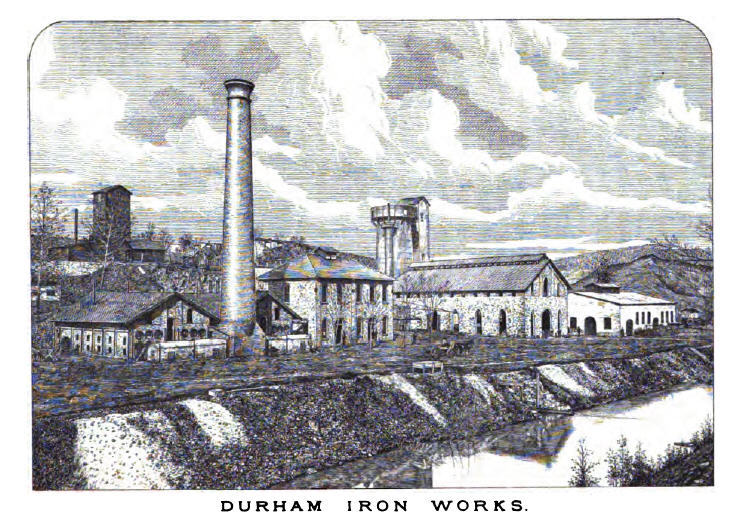
Durham Iron Works, as rebuilt in 1874. Illustration from William Watts Hart Davis' History of Bucks County, 1876.

Taylor's service in Congress lasted under seven months. On February 17, 1777, when the Assembly appointed a new Pennsylvania delegation, Taylor was one of seven signers from Pennsylvania who were not among those nominated for reelection. In March 1777, he was appointed to Pennsylvania's Supreme Executive Council, which was formed to govern the commonwealth under its new constitution. Taylor attended all of the council's daily meetings from March 4 through April 5 but fell ill and was bedridden for more than a month. He subsequently retired from the council, ending his public career.

Taylor continued overseeing cannon shot and shells production at Durham Furnace for the Continental Army and Navy. Not long after independence was achieved, however, Joseph Galloway fled Philadelphia, first seeking refuge with British General William Howe and later escaping to England. Galloway was subsequently convicted by the Assembly as a traitor, and his properties, including the Durham mill, were seized.

Taylor filed an appeal with the Supreme Executive Council that enabled him to finish the first five years of his lease, but in 1779, the Commissioner of Forfeited Estates sold Durham Furnace to a new owner. Forming yet another partnership, Taylor leased Greenwich Forge in what is now Warren County, New Jersey.

== 1780 Register of Enslaved Persons ==
At the end of his life, George Taylor registered two enslaved men, Tomm and Samm, with local government. The men were around 30 years old. Taylor's action was part of a legal document known as the 1780 Register of Enslaved Persons for Northampton County. The document was caused by Pennsylvania's gradual emancipation. Those who had slaves in the state had to register enslaved people by a certain date to maintain their enslaved status for life. It lists 58 enslaved people in the county in 1780 The men were included in Taylor's will and remained enslaved after his death.

== Personal life ==
Little is known of Taylor's life before he arrived in Philadelphia in 1736, although there is general agreement that he was born in Northern Ireland (possibly Ulster). His wife Ann Taylor's lineage, however, is well documented. Her grandfather, John Taylor, came to Pennsylvania from Wiltshire, England, in 1684 and became surveyor general of Chester County, Pennsylvania, which then accounted for about one-third of the colony. Later, her father, Isaac Taylor, served as Chester County's deputy surveyor general. Ann's family belonged to the Society of Friends, but she was disowned as a Quaker in 1733 for her marriage outside the circle to Samuel Savage Jr.

George and Ann Taylor had two children: a daughter Ann, who was called Nancy and died sometime during childhood, and a son James, who was born at Warwick Furnace in 1746. James studied law after his parents moved to Easton in 1763. In 1767, he married Elizabeth Gordon, the 17-year-old daughter of Lewis Gordon, Easton's first resident attorney. The couple initially lived in Easton but moved to Allentown, where James practiced law until he died in 1775. James and his wife had five children: George, Thomas, James Jr., Ann, and Mary.

== Death and legacy ==
In failing health, Taylor moved back to Easton in April 1780 and died there on February 23, 1781, at the age of 65. Taylor was buried in St. John's Lutheran Church cemetery across from his residence at Fourth and Ferry Streets in Easton. When the church property was sold in 1870 for construction of a public school, Taylor was re-interred at Easton Cemetery. Residents dedicated a monument there in Taylor's honor in 1855, and his body rests in front of the memorial. The house he leased in his final days is now known as the Parsons-Taylor House. Easton founder Wîlliam Parsons built it in 1753 and is Easton's oldest still-standing house today.

Taylor's will was filed in January 1781, the month before his death, and was entered into probate in Northampton County on March 10. Taylor bequeathed £500 to George, his eldest grandchild, and another £500 to Naomi Smith, his housekeeper, "in Consideration of her great Care & Attendance on me for a Number of Years." The remainder of Taylor's estate was to be divided equally between the grandchildren and five children he fathered with Naomi Smith: Sarah, Rebecca, Naomi, Elizabeth, and Edward. None of these bequests were ever fulfilled, however. Taylor had been experiencing financial difficulties in the last few years of his life, and legal entanglements over the Durham and Greenwich forges dragged on until 1799, at which point his estate was judged insolvent.

== See also ==
- Memorial to the 56 Signers of the Declaration of Independence
