= Hanover Township, Lehigh County, Pennsylvania =

Township in Pennsylvania, US

Hanover Township
- Township
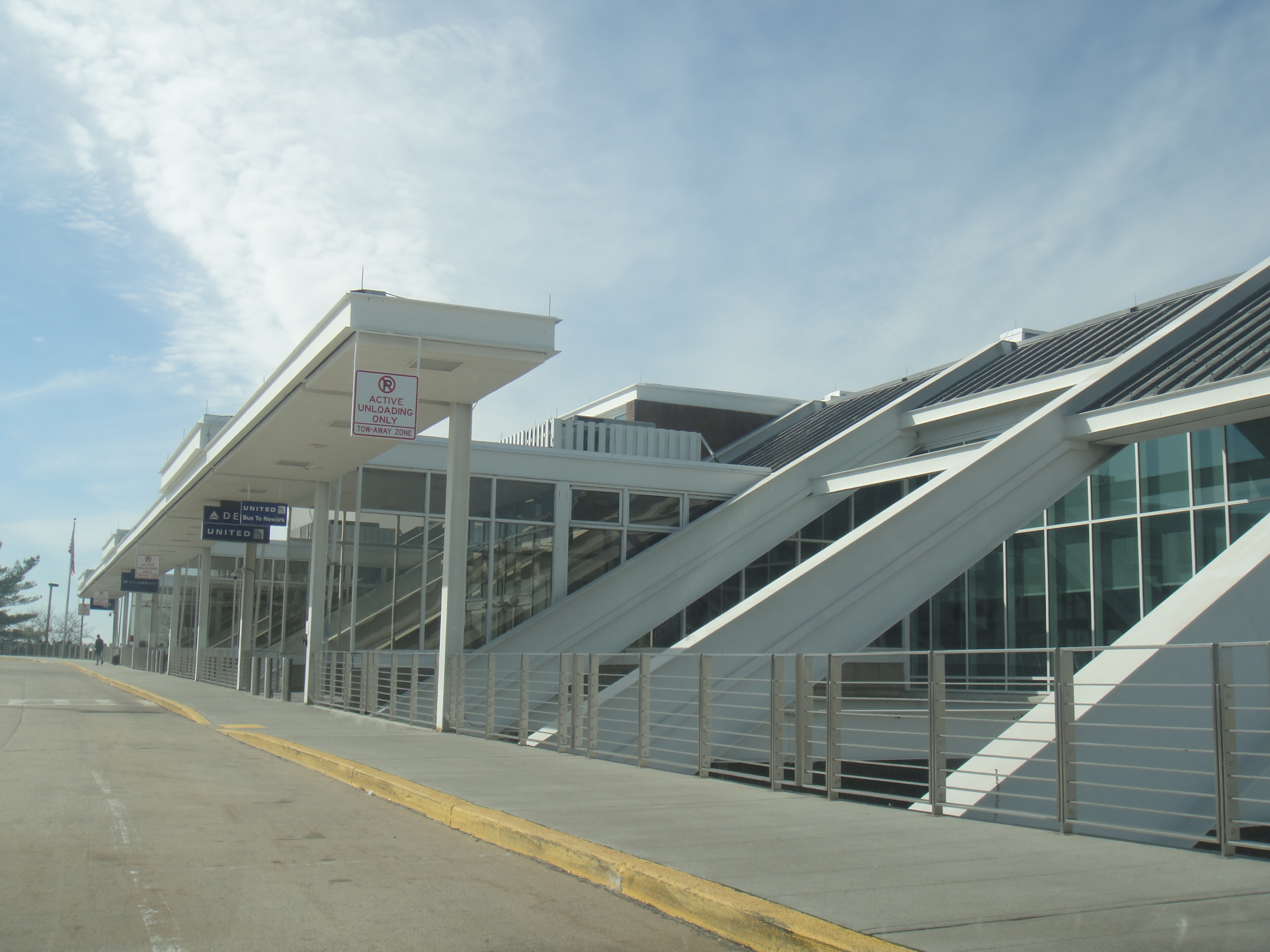
- Lehigh Valley International Airport in Hanover Township in March 2014

- Flag Seal

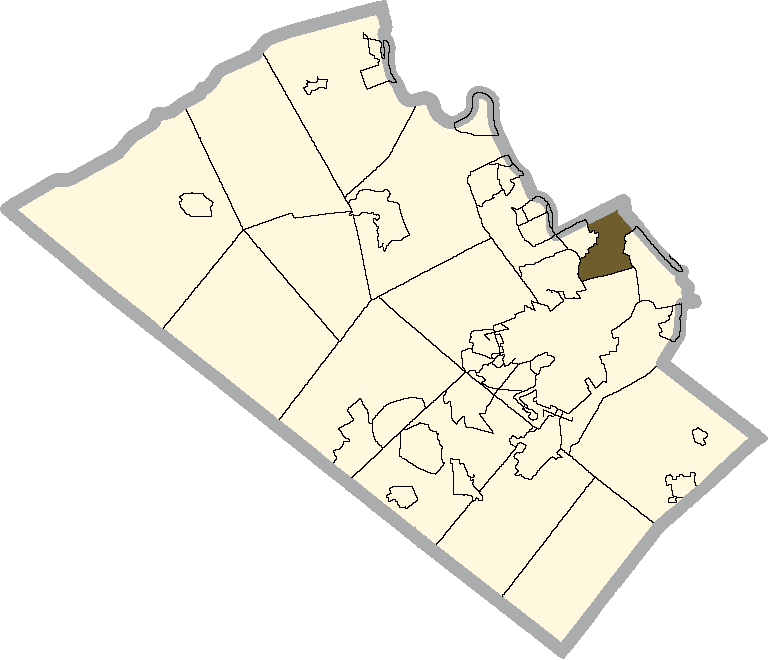
- Location of Hanover Township in Lehigh County, Pennsylvania

- Location in Pennsylvania Location in the United States
- Coordinates: 40°38′30″N 75°27′29″W
- Country: United States
- State: Pennsylvania
- County: Lehigh

Area
  - Township: 4.24 sq mi (10.97 km^{2})
  - Land: 4.20 sq mi (10.89 km^{2})
  - Water: 0.027 sq mi (0.07 km^{2})
- Elevation: 377 ft (115 m)

Population (2010)
  - Township: 1,571
  - Estimate (2016): 1,588
  - Density: 377.6/sq mi (145.78/km^{2})
  - Metro: 865,310 (US: 68th)
- Time zone: UTC-5 (EST)
  - Summer (DST): UTC-4 (EDT)
- ZIP code: 18109
- Area code: 610
- FIPS code: 42-077-32400
- Primary airport: Lehigh Valley International Airport
- Major hospital: Lehigh Valley Hospital–Cedar Crest
- School district: Catasauqua Area
- Website: www.hanleco.org

Hanover Township is a township in Lehigh County, Pennsylvania, United States. As of the 2010 census, the township had a population of 1,571. It is a suburb of Allentown and Bethlehem and part of the Lehigh Valley metropolitan area, which had a population of 861,899 and was the 68th-most populous metropolitan area in the U.S. as of the 2020 census.

Hanover Township is home of Lehigh Valley International Airport, the fourth-largest airport in Pennsylvania, with 851,000 passengers annually as of 2020.

== Geography ==
According to the U.S. Census Bureau, the township has a total area of 4.2 square miles (11 km^{2}), of which 0.03 square miles (0.08 km^{2}), or 0.71%, are water. The Lehigh River drains it and separates it from Whitehall Township.

=== Neighboring municipalities ===
- Bethlehem (east)
- Allentown (south)
- Whitehall Township (west)
- Catasauqua (west)
- Allen Township, Northampton County (north)
- East Allen Township, Northampton County (north-northeast)
- Hanover Township, Northampton County (northeast)

== Transportation ==
=== Roads and highways ===
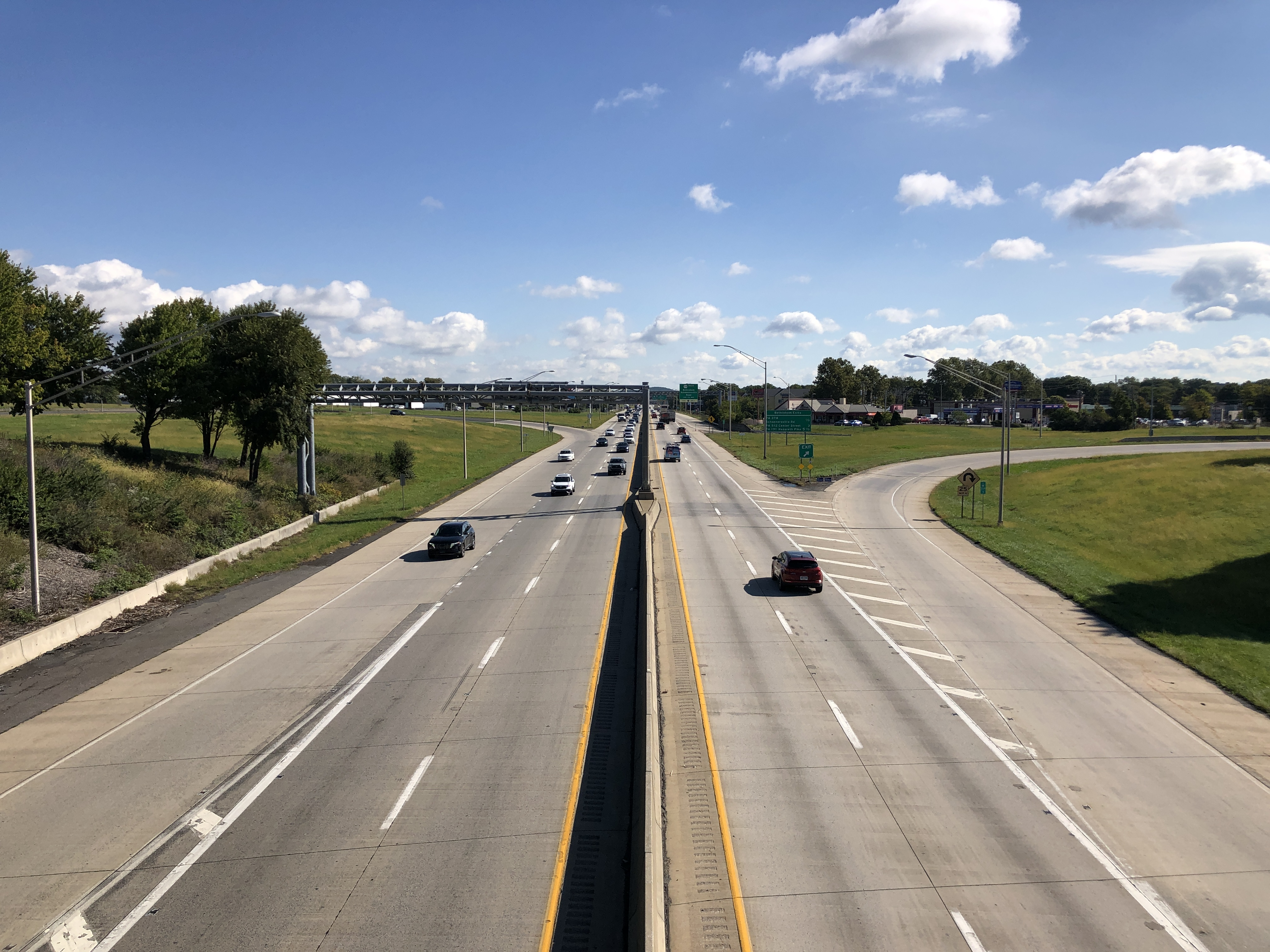
US 22 East in Hanover Township

As of 2022, there were 17.31 miles (27.86 km) of public roads in Hanover Township, of which 7.33 miles (11.80 km) were maintained by the Pennsylvania Department of Transportation (PennDOT) and 9.98 miles (16.06 km) were maintained by the township.

U.S. Route 22 crosses the township east-to-west and interchanges in the township with Airport Road, which extends northeast toward Bath as Pennsylvania Route 987 and south into Allentown. Other local roads of note include Catasauqua Road, Dauphin Street, Irving Street, Pennsylvania Avenue, Postal Road, Race Street, and Schoenersville Road (pronounced "SHAY-nerz-vil.") The latter two roads intersect Route 987 in the village of Schoenersville on the border with Northampton County.

=== Lehigh Valley International Airport ===
Lehigh Valley International Airport is located in Hanover Township. It is the fourth most heavily trafficked airport in Pennsylvania with 851,000 passengers annually as of 2020.

== Climate ==
The township has a hot-summer humid continental climate (Dfa) and the hardiness zone is 7a.

Climate data for Allentown, Pennsylvania at Lehigh Valley International Airport, 1991–2020 normals, (Note: Mean monthly maxima and minima (i.e. the highest and lowest temperature readings during an entire month or year) calculated based on data at said location from 1981 to 2010.) extremes 1922–present (Note: Official records for Allentown were kept at Allentown Gas Company from March 1922 to December 1943, and at Lehigh Valley Int'l since January 1944. For more information, see ThreadEx.)
Month	Jan	Feb	Mar	Apr	May	Jun	Jul	Aug	Sep	Oct	Nov	Dec	Year
Record high °F (°C)	72 (22)	81 (27)	87 (31)	93 (34)	97 (36)	100 (38)	105 (41)	100 (38)	99 (37)	93 (34)	81 (27)	72 (22)	105 (41)
Mean maximum °F (°C)	60.2 (15.7)	60.6 (15.9)	70.6 (21.4)	83.2 (28.4)	89.3 (31.8)	92.6 (33.7)	94.8 (34.9)	92.8 (33.8)	89.2 (31.8)	80.4 (26.9)	70.9 (21.6)	61.7 (16.5)	95.9 (35.5)
Mean daily maximum °F (°C)	38.4 (3.6)	41.6 (5.3)	50.8 (10.4)	63.4 (17.4)	73.5 (23.1)	81.9 (27.7)	86.4 (30.2)	84.3 (29.1)	77.4 (25.2)	65.5 (18.6)	53.8 (12.1)	43.1 (6.2)	63.3 (17.4)
Daily mean °F (°C)	30.1 (−1.1)	32.4 (0.2)	40.7 (4.8)	51.8 (11.0)	62.0 (16.7)	70.9 (21.6)	75.6 (24.2)	73.6 (23.1)	66.3 (19.1)	54.6 (12.6)	43.9 (6.6)	35.0 (1.7)	53.1 (11.7)
Mean daily minimum °F (°C)	21.8 (−5.7)	23.2 (−4.9)	30.5 (−0.8)	40.3 (4.6)	50.6 (10.3)	59.9 (15.5)	64.7 (18.2)	62.8 (17.1)	55.2 (12.9)	43.8 (6.6)	34.1 (1.2)	26.8 (−2.9)	42.8 (6.0)
Mean minimum °F (°C)	4.2 (−15.4)	5.9 (−14.5)	14.1 (−9.9)	25.9 (−3.4)	35.3 (1.8)	46.5 (8.1)	53.7 (12.1)	51.1 (10.6)	39.9 (4.4)	28.7 (−1.8)	19.1 (−7.2)	11.7 (−11.3)	1.8 (−16.8)
Record low °F (°C)	−15 (−26)	−12 (−24)	−5 (−21)	12 (−11)	28 (−2)	39 (4)	46 (8)	41 (5)	30 (−1)	21 (−6)	3 (−16)	−8 (−22)	−15 (−26)
Average precipitation inches (mm)	3.30 (84)	2.77 (70)	3.63 (92)	3.67 (93)	3.65 (93)	4.40 (112)	5.30 (135)	4.56 (116)	4.84 (123)	4.14 (105)	3.24 (82)	3.86 (98)	47.36 (1,203)
Average snowfall inches (cm)	9.8 (25)	10.8 (27)	6.3 (16)	0.5 (1.3)	0.0 (0.0)	0.0 (0.0)	0.0 (0.0)	0.0 (0.0)	0.0 (0.0)	0.2 (0.51)	0.9 (2.3)	4.6 (12)	33.1 (84)
Average extreme snow depth inches (cm)	6.4 (16)	7.9 (20)	4.9 (12)	0.3 (0.76)	0.0 (0.0)	0.0 (0.0)	0.0 (0.0)	0.0 (0.0)	0.0 (0.0)	0.2 (0.51)	0.6 (1.5)	2.9 (7.4)	12.4 (31)
Average precipitation days (≥ 0.01 in)	11.4	10.1	10.9	11.8	12.4	11.4	11.0	10.2	9.6	9.9	8.9	11.5	129.1
Average snowy days (≥ 0.1 in)	5.1	4.3	2.6	0.3	0.0	0.0	0.0	0.0	0.0	0.0	0.5	2.9	15.7
Average relative humidity (%)	70	66	62	61	66	68	70	72	74	72	70	71	69
Percentage possible sunshine	43	48	53	47	54	63	57	56	54	53	45	42	51
Source: NOAA (relative humidity 1981–2010)

== Demographics ==
Historical population
Census	Pop.	Note	%±
2000	1,913		—
2010	1,571		−17.9%
2016 (est.)	1,588		1.1%
U.S. Decennial Census

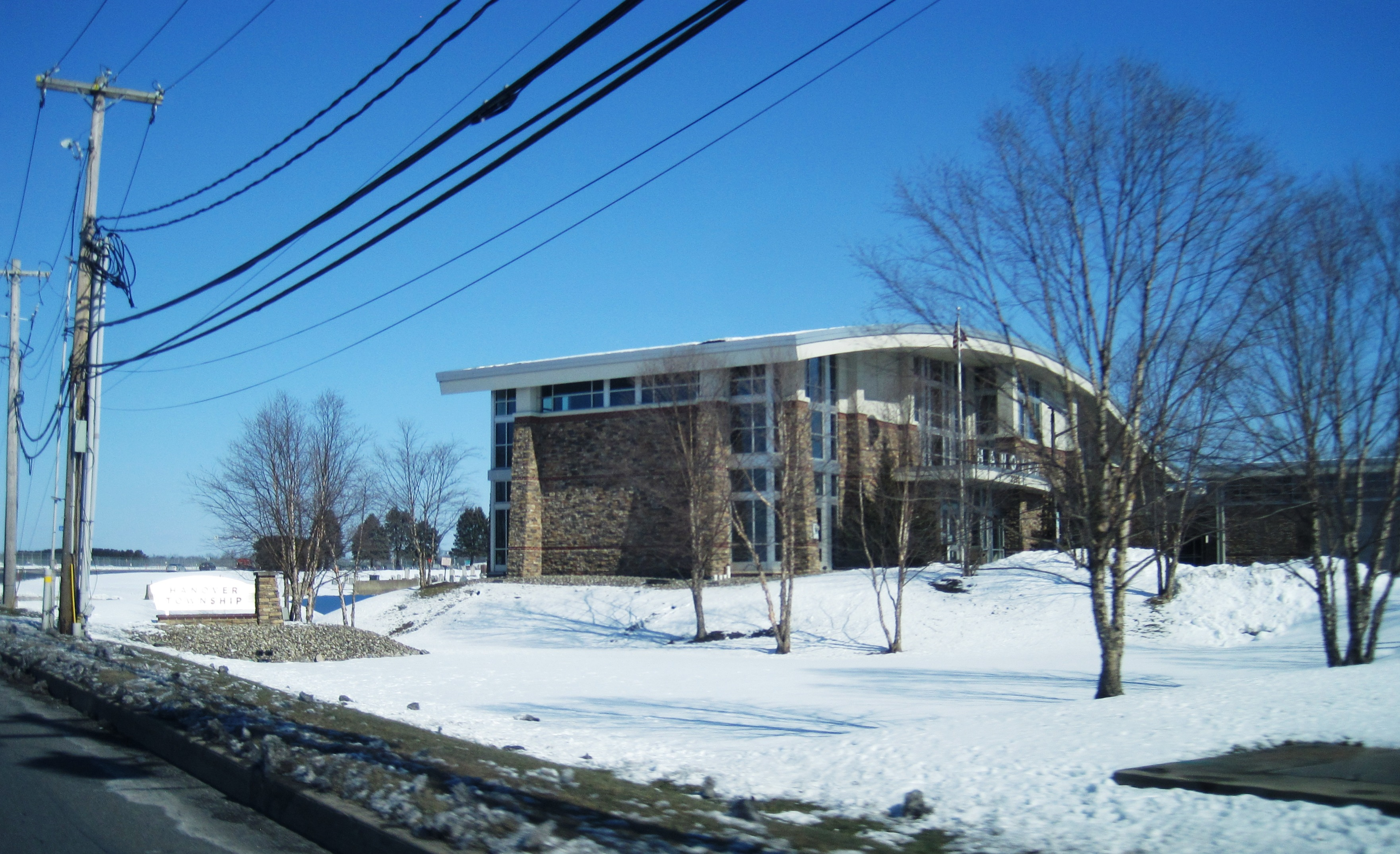
Hanover Township Municipal Building

As of the census of 2000, there were 1,913 people, 892 households, and 498 families residing in the township. The population density was 454.6 inhabitants per square mile (175.5/km^{2}). There were 937 housing units at an average density of 222.7 per square mile (86.0/km^{2}). The racial makeup of the township was 86.15% White, 5.54% African American, 0.05% Native American, 4.70% Asian, 1.99% from other races, and 1.57% from two or more races. Hispanic or Latino of any race were 6.12% of the population.

There were 892 households, out of which 20.6% had children under the age of 18 living with them, 41.1% were married couples living together, 11.3% had a female householder with no husband present, and 44.1% were non-families. 34.1% of all households were made up of individuals, and 8.9% had someone living alone who was 65 years of age or older. The average household size was 2.14 and the average family size was 2.77.

In the township, the population was spread out, with 18.3% under the age of 18, 8.7% from 18 to 24, 32.9% from 25 to 44, 26.2% from 45 to 64, and 13.8% who were 65 years of age or older. The median age was 38 years. For every 100 females, there were 96.4 males. For every 100 females age 18 and over, there were 93.8 males. The median income for a household in the township was $35,061, and the median income for a family was $41,680. Males had a median income of $31,848 versus $27,014 for females. The per capita income for the township was $20,265. About 4.0% of families and 5.6% of the population were below the poverty line, including 6.3% of those under age 18 and 8.5% of those age 65 or over.

United States presidential election results for Hanover Township, Lehigh County, Pennsylvania
Year	Republican		Democratic		Third party(ies)	
Year	No.	%	No.	%	No.	%
2024	346	48.46%	361	50.56%	7	0.98%
2020	303	42.08%	407	56.53%	10	1.39%
2016	295	45.67%	323	50.00%	28	4.33%
2012	253	42.45%	337	56.54%	6	1.01%
2008	227	36.38%	388	62.18%	9	1.44%
2004	284	45.59%	334	53.61%	5	0.80%

== Public education ==
The township is served by the Catasauqua Area School District. High school students in grades nine through 12 attend Catasauqua High School in Northampton.
