= Thomas J. Lynch =

United States Army Air Force pilot (1916–1944)

Thomas Joseph Lynch
- Born: December 9, 1916; Hazleton, Pennsylvania, U.S.
- Died: March 8, 1944 (aged 27) near Aitape, Papua New Guinea
- Military career
- Allegiance: United States
- Branch: United States Army Air Forces
- Service years: 1940–1944
- Rank: Lieutenant Colonel
- Nickname: "Tommy"
- Unit: 35th Fighter Group
- Commands: 39th Fighter Squadron
- Conflicts: World War II
- Awards: Distinguished Service Cross; Silver Star; Distinguished Flying Cross (6); Purple Heart (2); Air Medal (10)

Thomas Joseph Lynch (December 9, 1916 – March 8, 1944) was a United States Army Air Forces lieutenant colonel and a flying ace of World War II. After joining the United States Army Air Corps in 1940, Lynch flew the Bell P-39 Airacobra with the 39th Pursuit Squadron. After the attack on Pearl Harbor, the squadron was deployed to Australia and then to Port Moresby in early 1942.

Lynch downed three Japanese planes while flying the P-39, and in June the squadron (now redesignated the 39th Fighter Squadron) was selected to be the first Fifth Air Force squadron to be reequipped with the new Lockheed P-38 Lightning. Lynch claimed two more victories in late December to become an ace. He became commander of the squadron in March 1943. By October Lynch had 16 victories. He went back to his hometown of Catasauqua, Pennsylvania, and married. Returning to the Pacific, Lynch claimed four more victories, and was killed while strafing Japanese barges on 8 March 1944.

== Early life and education ==
Lynch was born on December 9, 1916, in Hazleton, Pennsylvania, the third of seven children to Irish immigrants William and Alice (McGeehan) Lynch, where his father owned a milk business in Hazleton. His family soon moved to Catasauqua. Lynch was an Eagle Scout and graduated from Catasauqua High School in Northampton, Pennsylvania in 1936.

He attended the University of Pittsburgh, where he was undefeated in intramural boxing and joined ROTC and the Scabbard and Blade, a military honor society. He graduated with a degree in chemical engineering in 1940.

== Military career ==
Lynch joined the United States Army Air Corps as an aviation cadet in June 1940, completed pilot training, and earned his wings at Maxwell Field, Alabama (Class 41-A). He was assigned to the 39th Pursuit Squadron in March 1941 at Selfridge Field, Michigan, flying the Bell P-39 Airacobra. The squadron spent most of the year training.

=== World War II ===
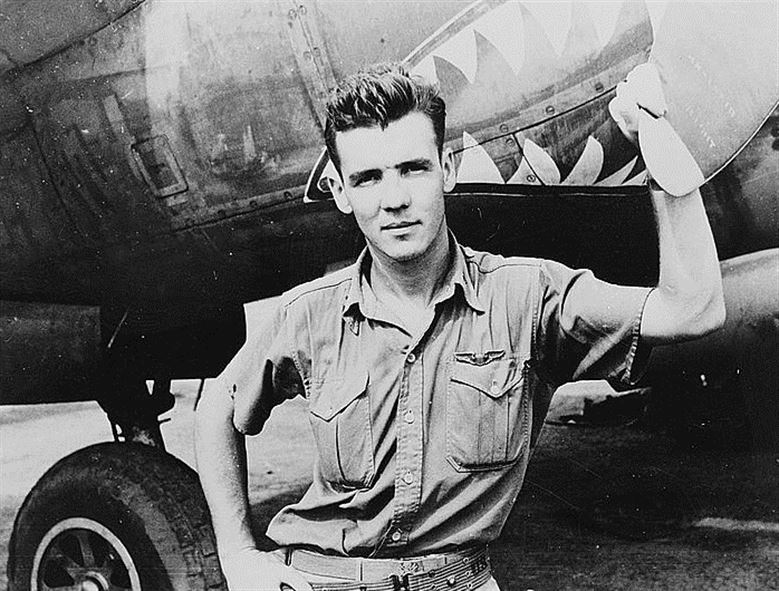
Captain Thomas J. Lynch and his P-38 (March 1943)

Pearl Harbor was attacked December 7, and by January, 1942 twenty pilots of the 39th were aboard the SS Ancon (1901) bound for Brisbane, Australia. The squadron (redesignated the 39th Fighter Squadron on 15 May) was one of the first units deployed to Port Moresby on New Guinea's frontline, operating under difficult weather conditions and engaging enemy pilots flying the faster and more maneuverable Zero. On 20 May, Lynch claimed his first two victories. A third followed on 26 May, while Lynch and other pilots from the squadron escorted a troop transport flight. On 16 June Lt. Lynch was jumped by 2 Zeros. He managed to break away, only to be attacked by 4 more. He eventually shook off his pursuers but was unable to coax his heavily damaged P-39 back to base. Lynch was forced to bail out at 800 ft off the coast of Port Moresby, breaking his arm in the process of exiting the cockpit.

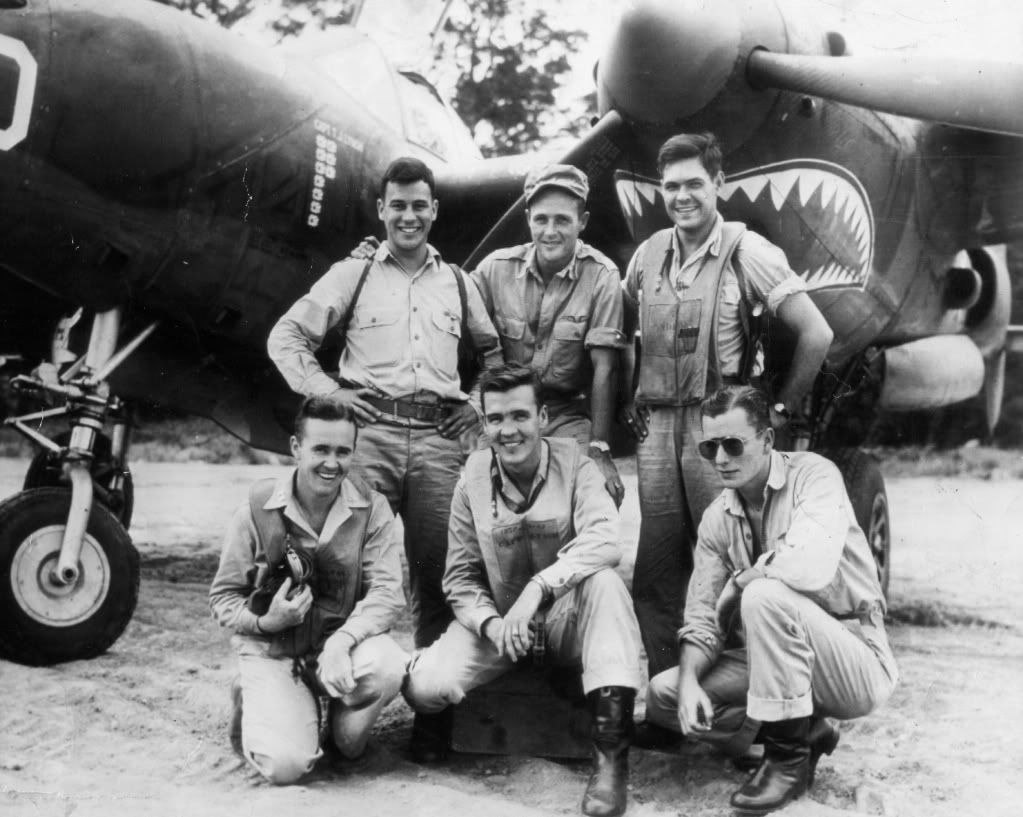
Aces of the 39th FS at Schwimmer Airfield, May 1943, in front of squadron commander Thomas J. Lynch's P-38 number 10. Kneeling, left to right: Captain Charles P. O'Sullivan, Captain Thomas J. Lynch, 1st Lieutenant Kenneth C. Sparks. Standing, left to right: Captain Richard C. Suehr, 1st Lieutenant John H. Lane, 1st Lieutenant Stanley O. Andrews.

In June 1942, the squadron was selected to become the first Fifth Air Force P-38 squadron, and after reequipping with the new aircraft was back in combat from November, operating out of Laloki airfield. On 27 December, Lynch became an ace after he shot down two Nakajima Ki-43 Oscars over the Buna beachhead. For this action, which resulted in the breaking up of an attempted Japanese bombing raid, he was awarded the Distinguished Service Cross. He claimed two more Mitsubishi A6M Zeroes on 31 December during a bomber escort mission to Lae.

On 6 January 1943, P-38s from the squadron bombed a Japanese reinforcement convoy bound for Lae. Lynch claimed a possible bomb hit on one ship. Lynch downed a Ki-43 while escorting Curtiss P-40 Kittyhawks on their way to bomb the Lae convoy on the next day. On 3 March, he claimed another Zero during the Battle of the Bismarck Sea.

On 24 March, Lynch became commander of the 39th Fighter Squadron. On the afternoon of 8 May, he shot down a "Hamp".

Lynch claimed another victory on 12 June. He was promoted to major in July. While on a bomber escort mission to Wewak, he claimed two Kawasaki Ki-45 Nicks on 20 August. On 21 August, he downed another Japanese aircraft. Lynch became one of the first in the South West Pacific to shoot down a Kawasaki Ki-48 Lily bomber on 4 September over the Huon Gulf. On 16 September he claimed his sixteenth victory. Lynch took a 30-day leave in October, marrying his college girlfriend, Rosemary Fullen, in Swissvale on 23 October.

Lynch returned to combat in January, assigned to V Fighter Command alongside fellow top-scoring ace Richard Bong. Bong and Lynch were allowed to "free-lance" for the next months. On 10 February 1944, Lynch claimed a victory in the Wewak area. On 15 February Lynch covered Bong while he downed a Kawasaki Ki-61 Tony on a flight back from an escort mission to Kavieng. On 28 February, he also covered Bong while he destroyed a Japanese transport possibly carrying senior officers on the Wewak runway.

After this mission, Lynch was promoted to lieutenant colonel. He claimed two more victories on 3 March. Lynch claimed his twentieth and last victory on 5 March.

=== Death ===
On 8 March, Lynch and Bong strafed barges in Aitape harbor. After setting one on fire on their first pass, they returned for a second pass when Lynch's P-38 was hit in the engine. Lynch's plane began to burn and he bailed out too close to the ground for his parachute to deploy. His remains were never found.

== Military decorations ==
Lynch earned the following decorations:

United States Army Air Forces pilot badge
Distinguished Service Cross
Silver Star	Distinguished Flying Cross with silver oak leaf cluster	Purple Heart with bronze oak leaf cluster
Air Medal with one silver and threebronze oak leaf clusters	Air Medal (second ribbon required for accouterment spacing)	American Defense Service Medal
American Campaign Medal	Asiatic-Pacific Campaign Medal with three bronze campaign stars	World War II Victory Medal

Army Presidential Unit Citation
with bronze oak leaf cluster

=== Distinguished Service Cross citation ===

Lynch, Thomas J.
Captain, U.S. Army Air Forces
39th Fighter Squadron, 35th Fighter Group, Fifth Air Force
Date of Action: December 27, 1942

Citation:

The President of the United States of America, authorized by Act of Congress July 9, 1918, takes pleasure in presenting the Distinguished Service Cross to Captain (Air Corps) Thomas Joseph Lynch, United States Army Air Forces, for extraordinary heroism in connection with military operations against an armed enemy while serving as Pilot of a P-38 Fighter Airplane in the 39th Fighter Squadron, 35th Fighter Group, Fifth Air Force, in action near Buna, New Guinea, on 27 December 1942. Captain Lynch was leading a patrol flight of four P-38 planes when a formation of eight to ten enemy dive-bombers accompanied by fifteen to twenty fighter aircraft approached. The pilots of his flight were inexperienced and the P-38 as yet untried in combat in this area. Despite the odds, Captain Lynch led his flight in a determined attack. He succeeded in breaking the enemy formation and in preventing the enemy dive-bombers from reaching their objective. He shot down two planes, while others in his flight accounted for five. Because of Captain Lynch's daring and effective attack, other flights of our aircraft in the vicinity were enabled to attack the scattered enemy, and to shoot down six more and damage another. This engagement greatly heightened the combat spirit of Captain Lynch's squadron. Captain Lynch's unquestionable valor in aerial combat is in keeping with the highest traditions of the military service and reflects great credit upon himself, the 5th Air Force, and the United States Army Air Forces.

== Aerial victory credits ==
The data in the following table is from Newton and Senning (1978).

Date	Credits
20 May 1942	2
26 May 1942	1
27 December 1942	2
31 December 1942	2
7 January 1943	1
3 March 1943	1
8 May 1943	1
12 June 1943	1
20 August 1943	2
21 August 1943	1
4 September 1943	1
16 September 1943	1
10 February 1944	1
3 March 1944	2
5 March 1944	1

== Legacy ==
There is a cenotaph placed for him at Calvary Cemetery in North Catasauqua, Pennsylvania. He is also listed on the Walls of the Missing at Manila American Cemetery.

The Hokendauqua-North Catasauqua Bridge was renamed the Lieutenant Colonel Thomas Lynch Memorial Bridge after its December 2015 reopening.

== Bibliography ==
=== Sources ===
- Bradley, Phillip (2008). The Battle for Wau: New Guinea's Frontline 1942–1943. Cambridge: Cambridge University Press. ISBN 9780521896818.
- Newton, Wesely P. Jr.; Senning, Calvin F. (1978) [1963]. USAF Credits for the Destruction of Enemy Aircraft, World War II, USAF Historical Study No. 85 (PDF). Research Studies Institute, USAF Historical Division, Air University.
- Stanaway, John (2014). P-38 Lightning Aces 1942–43. Oxford: Osprey Publishing. ISBN 9781782003335.
