= North Catasauqua, Pennsylvania =

Borough in Pennsylvania, US

Borough of North Catasauqua
- Borough
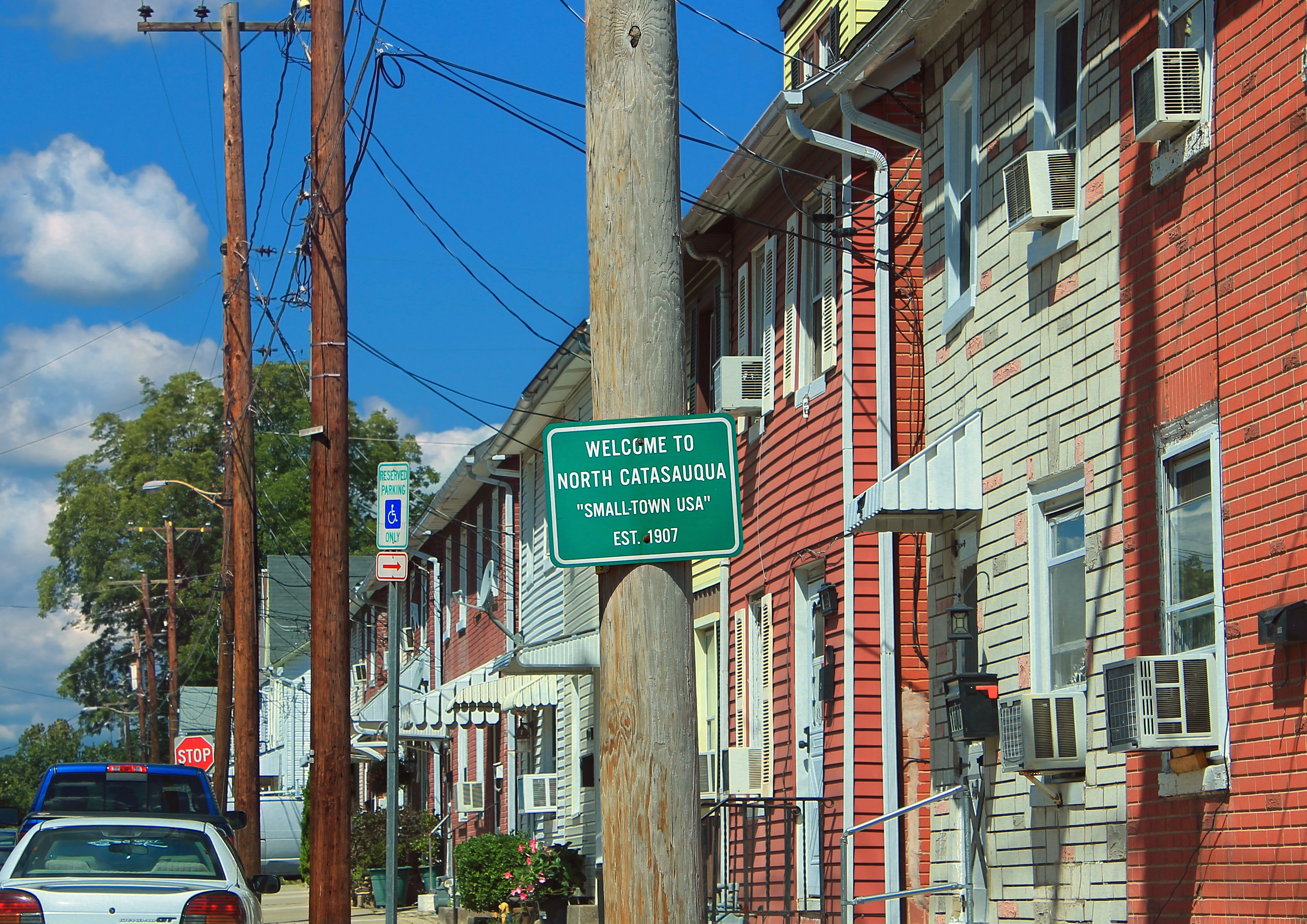
- Homes in North Catasauqua in September 2012
- Nickname: small Town USA
- Location of North Catasauqua in Northampton County, Pennsylvania (left) and of Northampton County in Pennsylvania (right)

- Location of North Catasauqua in Pennsylvania North Catasauqua (the United States)
- Coordinates: 40°39′43″N 75°28′34″W
- Country: United States
- State: Pennsylvania
- County: Northampton
- Founded: June 11, 1907

Government
  - Mayor: William Molchany, Jr.

Area
  - Borough: 0.74 sq mi (1.92 km^{2})
  - Land: 0.72 sq mi (1.86 km^{2})
  - Water: 0.023 sq mi (0.06 km^{2})
- Elevation: 371 ft (113 m)

Population (2020)
  - Borough: 2,971
  - Density: 4,139/sq mi (1,598.2/km^{2})
  - Metro: 865,310 (US: 68th)
- Time zone: UTC-5 (EST)
  - Summer (DST): UTC-4 (EDT)
- Area codes: 610 and 484
- FIPS code: 42-54872
- Primary airport: Lehigh Valley International Airport
- Major hospital: Lehigh Valley Hospital–Cedar Crest
- School district: Catasauqua Area
- Website: www.northcatasauqua.org

North Catasauqua is a borough in Northampton County, Pennsylvania, United States. The borough was founded in 1907. The population of North Catasauqua was 2,971 at the 2020 census. The borough is part of the Lehigh Valley metropolitan area, which had a population of 861,899 and was the 68th-most populous metropolitan area in the U.S. as of the 2020 census.

In August 2008, borough council officially adopted and christened North Catasauqua as "small Town U.S.A.", with a campaign devised by the North Catasauqua Betterment Committee for the official recognition.

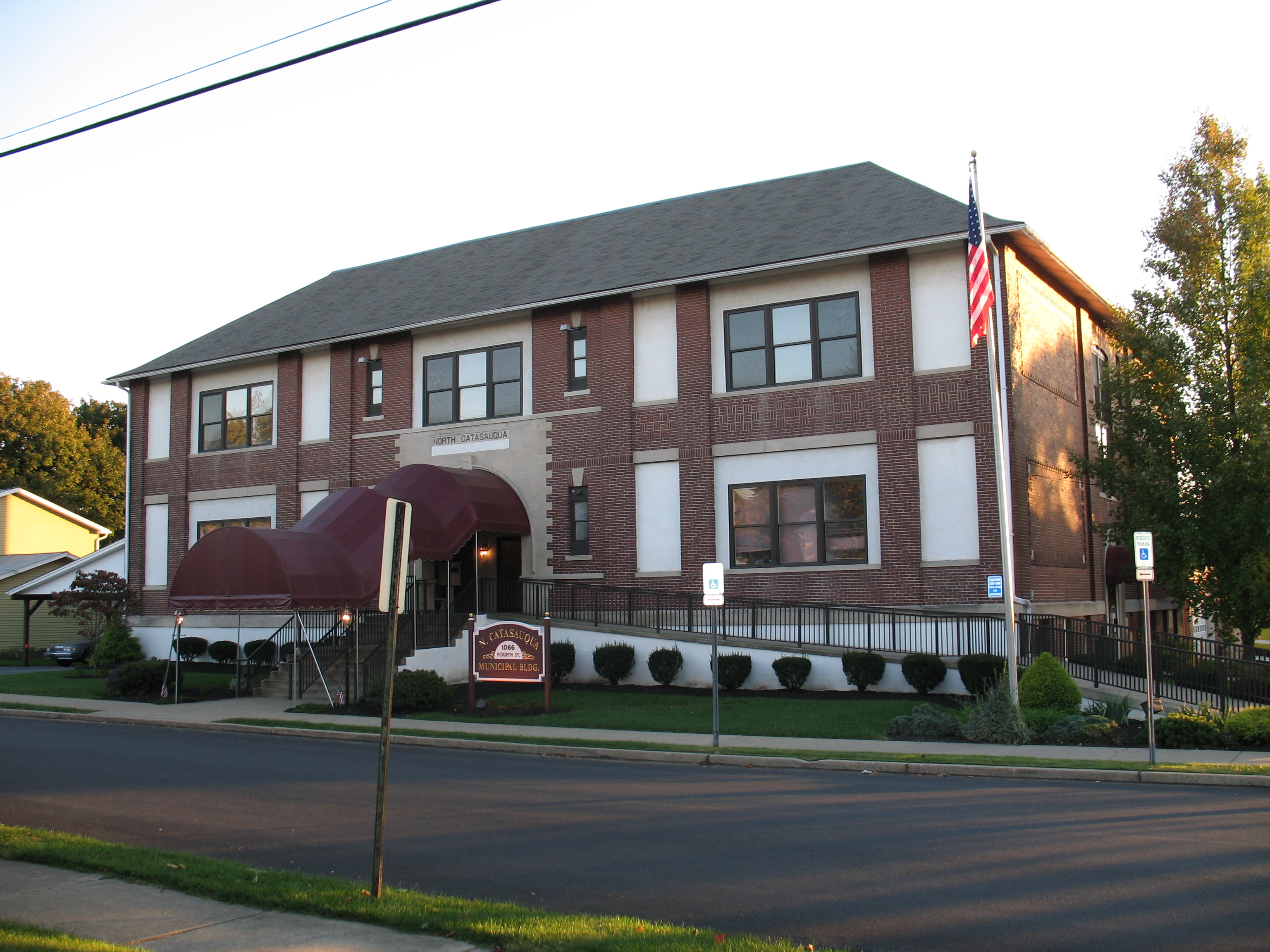
North Catasauqua Borough Hall

== History ==
=== 20th century ===
In 1907, citizens of West Allen Township met at the Northampton Hotel, and signed a petition declaring the formation of the North Catasauqua. The petition was submitted to the county in early June, the final decree of incorporation was made on June 11, and was officially entered into the records on June 17. Shortly after the incorporation, the first borough elections were held, with William H. Thomas becoming the first burgess, an office equivalent to a present-day mayor.

Located between the larger boroughs of Catasauqua in Lehigh County and Northampton in Northampton County, North Catasauqua quickly grew as businesses and residents came into the new borough. A police department was formed along with the Charotin Fire Department in 1909. A new combined firehouse and municipal building was built in 1911. Prior to this, firefighting equipment was housed at the Hoffman and Follweiler stables. Church services were held around the borough at various places of worship including St. Lawrence Church (built in 1857), St. Andrew's Church (built in 1903), and Holy Trinity Church, which was built in 1903.

In 1913, North Catasauqua School District razed the four-room Allen Township schoolhouse so that a new one could be built. The new school building housed grades 1-8 and featured, what were at the time, state-of-the-art amenities. After a merger of North Catasauqua and Catasauqua school districts in 1953, the school housed elementary grades 1-6 until June 1972.

On June 14, 1947, the borough celebrated the opening of the North Catasauqua Park and Playground built on 4 acres (16,000 m^{2}) of land purchased from Northampton County. At the time, the park included a war memorial, complete with flagpole and monument (erected in 1945); playground equipment; a baseball diamond; and 95 Sycamore trees. The park and playground quickly became a popular spot for play and recreation, as well as band concerts, picnics, the borough Christmas tree, and carnivals. The Willowbrook Golf Course has played an important role in the borough's development. The golf course was originally a private five-hole course built by Colonel James Fuller on the Willowbrook Farm Estate to entertain personal friends and executives visiting the Fuller Company in Catasauqua. In 1932, the golf course opened as a private nine-hole course leased to Dr. Calvin Miller from Mrs. Dorothy Fuller, the Colonel's widow. The golf course was open to the public in 1934 as a way to pay for expenses. The golf course has grown over the years and has become a popular course for local residents and area golfers. Today, the golf course has been closed so more housing can be built in the borough.

In 1975, North Catasauqua borough obtained possession of the building and transferred the municipal offices to the site in 1976. In 1995, extensive renovations took place and a rededication ceremony was held in 1996. The municipal building now houses the borough police department, borough offices, council chambers, a meeting room, fire department administrative headquarters, as well as room for future expansion.

Charotin Fire Department was relocated to the municipal building site in 1980 with the building of a new combined fire station and public works garage. The North Catasauqua Public Works Department moved to its present location at the Main Street complex when the old Charotin fire station and municipal garages were sold in 1986. A public works building was built in 1983 at the Main Street complex. The new building included garages and an office, and allowed all of the public works’ equipment to be housed in one building.

=== 21st century ===
In 2004, an additional building was erected. This new facility allows for increased storage and includes bigger garage bays, offices, a break room, and shower facilities for employees. A paved pathway leading down to the Delaware and Lehigh Canal towpath and Lehigh River was created, along with a parking lot, for future public recreation at the river. North Catasauqua borough celebrated the centennial of its incorporation with a year-long celebration in 2007.

== Geography ==
North Catasauqua is located at 40°39′43″N 75°28′34″W (40.661896, -75.476015). According to the U.S. Census Bureau, the borough has a total area of 0.8 square mile (1.9 km^{2}), of which 0.7 square mile (1.9 km^{2}) is land and 0.04 square mile (0.1 km^{2}) (2.67%) is water.

The Lehigh River and Lehigh Canal and towpath provides the western border of the borough.

== Transportation ==
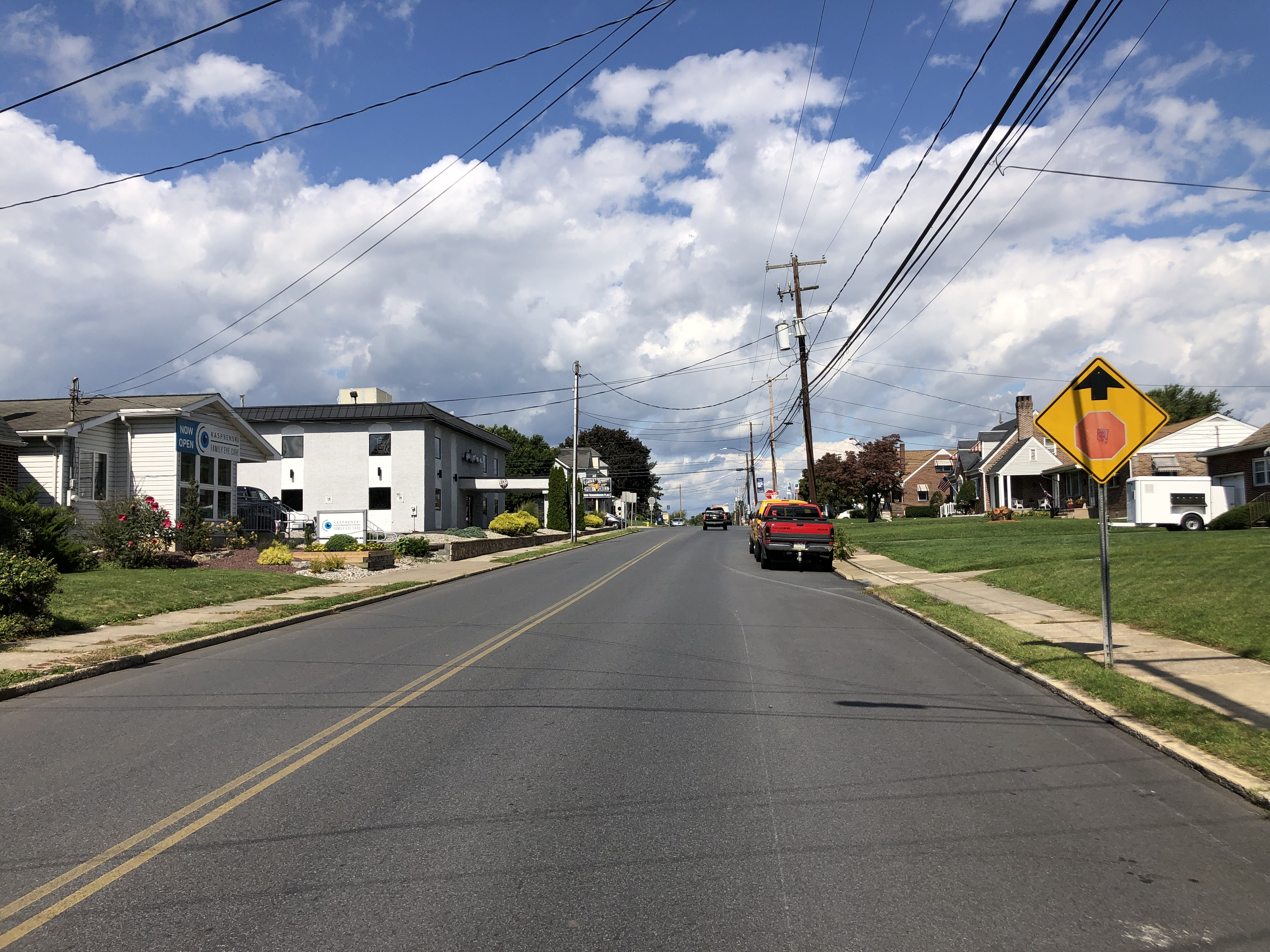
Howertown Road in North Catasauqua

As of 2007, there were 9.92 miles (15.96 km) of public roads in North Catasauqua, all of which were maintained by the borough. Main thoroughfares in Catasauqua include Howertown Road and Eugene Street.

== Demographics ==
Historical population
Census	Pop.	Note	%±
1910	2,030		—
1920	2,321		14.3%
1930	2,700		16.3%
1940	2,530		−6.3%
1950	2,629		3.9%
1960	2,805		6.7%
1970	2,941		4.8%
1980	2,554		−13.2%
1990	2,867		12.3%
2000	2,814		−1.8%
2010	2,849		1.2%
2020	2,971		4.3%

As of the 2010 census, there were 2,849 people, 1,181 households, and 809 families residing in the borough. The population density was 3,825.5 inhabitants per square mile (1,477.0/km^{2}). There were 1,186 housing units at an average density of 1,612.3 per square mile (622.5/km^{2}). The racial makeup of the borough was 95.2% White, 1.2% African American, 0.1% Native American, 0.9% Asian, 1.7% from other races, and 1% from two or more races. Hispanic or Latino of any race were 5.2% of the population.

There were 1,181 households, out of which 25.5% had children under the age of 18 living with them, 54.1% were married couples living together, 10.2% had a female householder with no husband present, and 31.5% were non-families. 27% of all households were made up of individuals, and 11.3% had someone living alone who was 65 years of age or older. The average household size was 2.41 and the average family size was 2.9.

In the borough, the population was spread out, with 23.2% under the age of 18, 7.1% from 18 to 24, 30.3% from 25 to 44, 23.2% from 45 to 64, and 16.1% who were 65 years of age or older. The median age was 39 years. For every 100 females there were 92.6 males. For every 100 females age 18 and over, there were 88.2 males. The median income for a household in the borough was $39,375, and the median income for a family was $47,214. Males had a median income of $35,324 versus $26,250 for females. The per capita income for the borough was $19,424. About 5.2% of families and 6.6% of the population were below the poverty line, including 6.2% of those under age 18 and 5.3% of those age 65 or over.

== Public education ==
The borough is served by the Catasauqua Area School District. Catasauqua High School serves grades 9–12. Catasauqua Middle School serves grades 5–8. Sheckler Elementary School serves grades K-4.

== Notable people ==
- Pat Kelly, former professional baseball player, New York Yankees, St. Louis Cardinals, and Toronto Blue Jays
