= Catasauqua, Pennsylvania =

Borough in Pennsylvania, US

- Borough
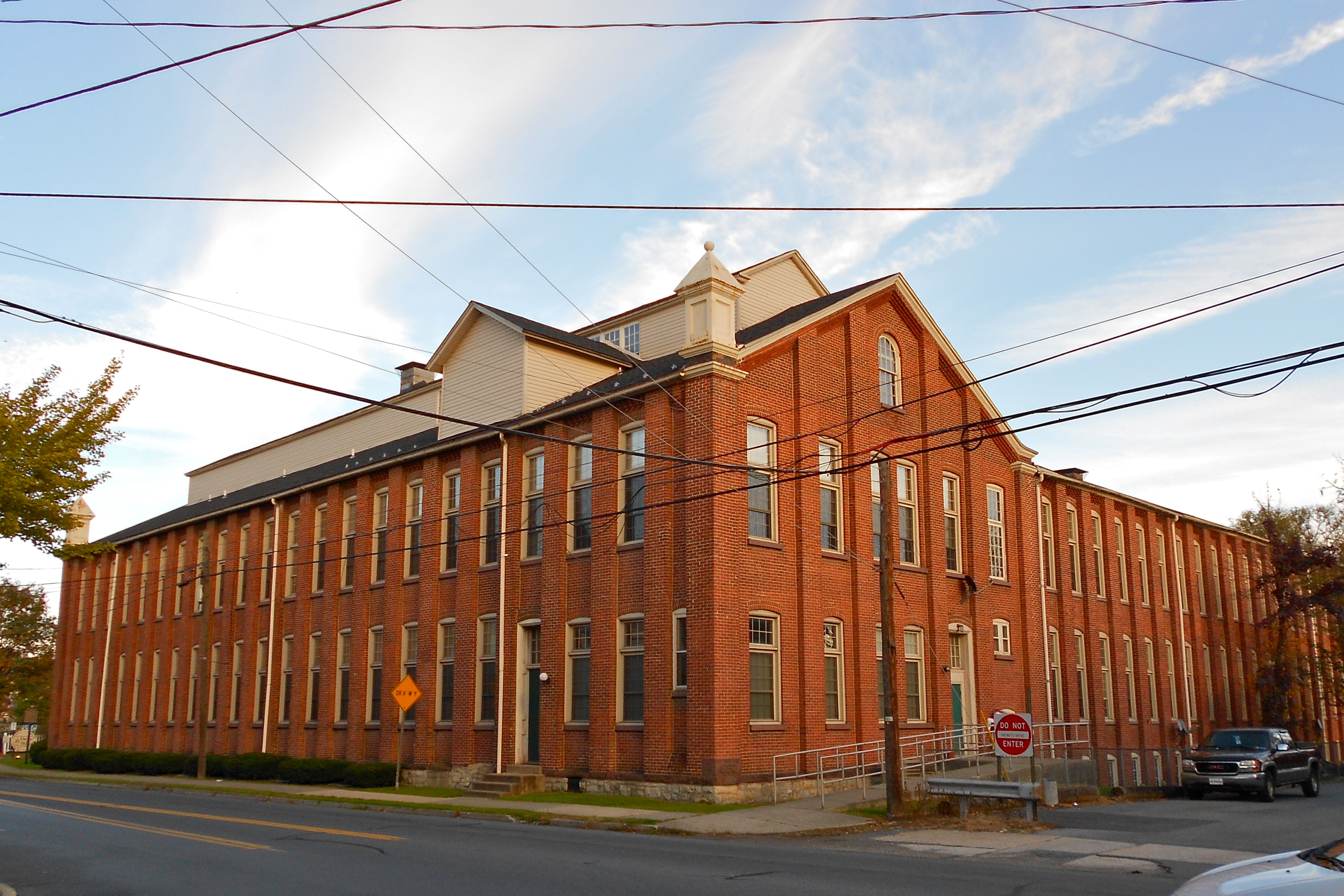
- Dery Silk Mill in the Biery's Port Historic District of Catasauqua in October 2012

- Seal

- Location of Catasauqua in Lehigh County, Pennsylvania (left) and of Lehigh County in Pennsylvania (right)

- Location of Catasauqua in Pennsylvania Catasauqua (the United States)
- Coordinates: 40°39′11″N 75°28′03″W
- Country: United States
- State: Pennsylvania
- County: Lehigh

Government
  - Mayor: Barbara Schlegel

Area
  - Borough: 1.33 sq mi (3.44 km^{2})
  - Land: 1.29 sq mi (3.35 km^{2})
  - Water: 0.039 sq mi (0.10 km^{2})
- Elevation: 279 ft (85 m)

Population (2020)
  - Borough: 6,518
  - Density: 5,045.6/sq mi (1,948.11/km^{2})
  - Metro: 865,310 (US: 68th)
- Time zone: UTC-5 (EST)
  - Summer (DST): UTC-4 (EDT)
- ZIP Code: 18032
- Area codes: 610 and 484
- FIPS code: 42-11720
- Primary airport: Lehigh Valley International Airport
- Major hospital: Lehigh Valley Hospital–Cedar Crest
- School district: Catasauqua Area
- Website: www.catasauqua.org

Catasauqua, referred to colloquially as Catty, is a borough in Lehigh County, Pennsylvania, United States. Catasauqua's population was 6,518 at the 2020 census. It is a suburb of Allentown in the Lehigh Valley, which had a population of 861,899 and was the 68th-most populous metropolitan area in the U.S. as of the 2020 census.

In 1839, Catasauqua was the location of the first manufactured anthracite iron in the nation. The borough was settled in 1805 and chartered in 1853.

== Geography ==
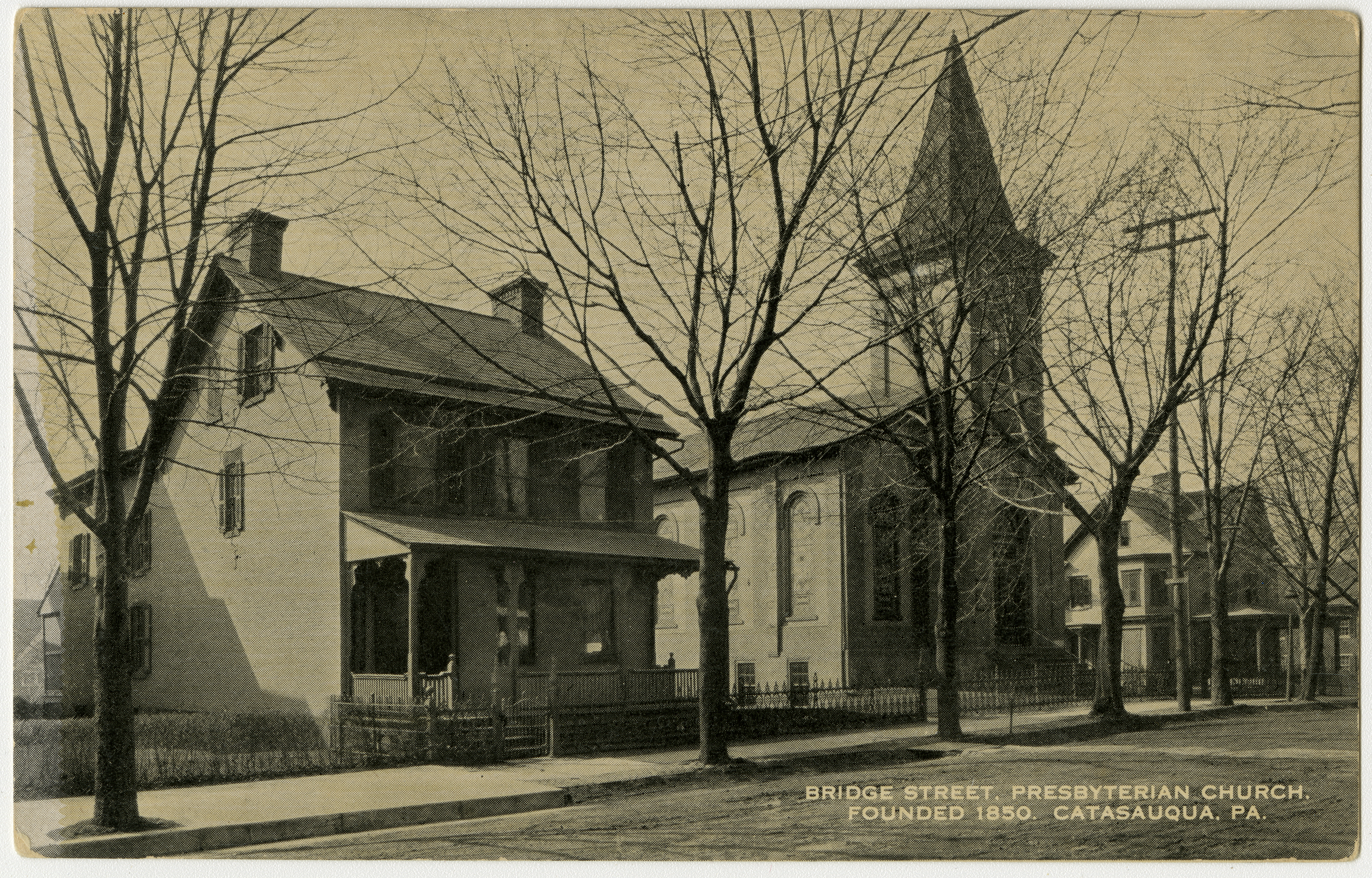
A pre-1923 sketch of Bridge Street Presbyterian Church, founded in 1850 in Catasauqua

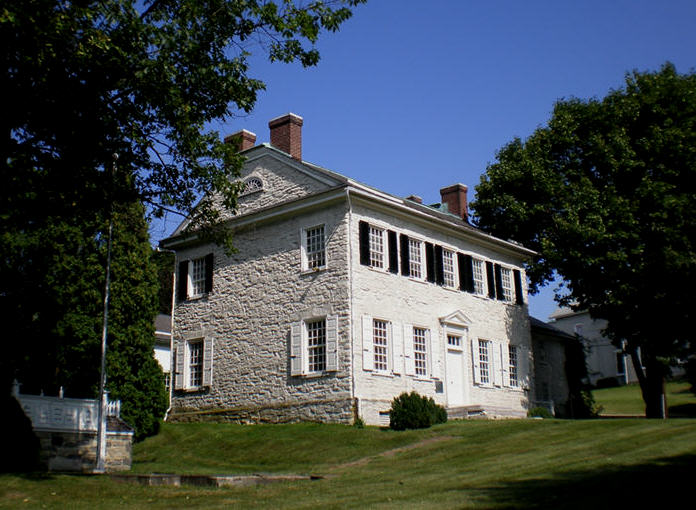
The George Taylor House in Catasauqua, home of George Taylor, a Founding Father of the United States who signed the Declaration of Independence

Catasauqua is located at 40°39′11″N 75°28′3″W (40.652995, -75.467627). Nearby large communities include Allentown three miles (4.8 km) to the south and Bethlehem seven miles (11 km) to the east. According to the U.S. Census Bureau, the borough has a total area of 1.3 square miles (3.4 km^{2}), of which 1.3 square miles (3.4 km^{2}) is land and 0.04 square miles (0.10 km^{2}) or 2.31%) is water. Catasauqua Creek flows through the town. Lehigh River runs along the southwestern edge of Catasauqua.

=== Neighboring municipalities ===
- Hanover Township
- North Catasauqua
- Whitehall Township
- Northampton
- Allentown
- Allen Township
- Bethlehem
- Coplay
- Hokendauqua

== Demographics ==
Historical population
Census	Pop.	Note	%±
1860	1,932		—
1870	2,853		47.7%
1880	3,065		7.4%
1890	3,704		20.8%
1900	3,963		7.0%
1910	5,250		32.5%
1920	4,714		−10.2%
1930	4,851		2.9%
1940	4,764		−1.8%
1950	4,923		3.3%
1960	5,062		2.8%
1970	5,702		12.6%
1980	6,711		17.7%
1990	6,662		−0.7%
2000	6,588		−1.1%
2010	6,436		−2.3%
2020	6,518		1.3%

As of the 2000 census, there were 6,588 people, 2,616 households, and 1,750 families residing in the borough. The population density was 5,205.7 inhabitants per square mile (2,009.9/km^{2}). There were 2,747 housing units at an average density of 2,170.6 per square mile (838.1/km^{2}). The racial makeup of the borough was 95.60% White, 1.18% African American, 0.33% Native American, 0.59% Asian, 0.02% Pacific Islander, 1.08% from other races, and 1.20% from two or more races. Hispanic or Latino of any race were 3.54% of the population.

There were 2,616 households, out of which 33.6% had children under the age of 18 living with them, 49.5% were married couples living together, 12.1% had a female householder with no husband present, and 33.1% were non-families. 27.6% of all households were made up of individuals, and 10.8% had someone living alone who was 65 years of age or older. The average household size was 2.50 and the average family size was 3.04.

In the borough, the age distribution of the population shows 25.0% under the age of 18, 7.7% from 18 to 24, 32.1% from 25 to 44, 22.3% from 45 to 64, and 12.9% who were 65 years of age or older. The median age was 36 years. For every 100 females there were 94.1 males. For every 100 females age 18 and over, there were 91.1 males. The median income for a household in the borough was $42,432, and the median income for a family was $48,589. Males had a median income of $32,320 versus $45,730 for females. The per capita income for the borough was $18,906. About 5.4% of families and 8.0% of the population were below the poverty line, including 11.7% of those under age 18 and 11.2% of those age 65 or over.

United States presidential election results for Catasauqua, Pennsylvania
Year	Republican		Democratic		Third party(ies)	
Year	No.	%	No.	%	No.	%
2024	1,564	50.55%	1,499	48.45%	31	1.00%
2020	1,496	48.15%	1,567	50.43%	44	1.42%
2016	1,244	46.04%	1,299	48.08%	159	5.88%
2012	1,013	40.65%	1,427	57.26%	52	2.09%
2008	1,064	38.92%	1,615	59.07%	55	2.01%
2004	1,216	46.66%	1,366	52.42%	24	0.92%

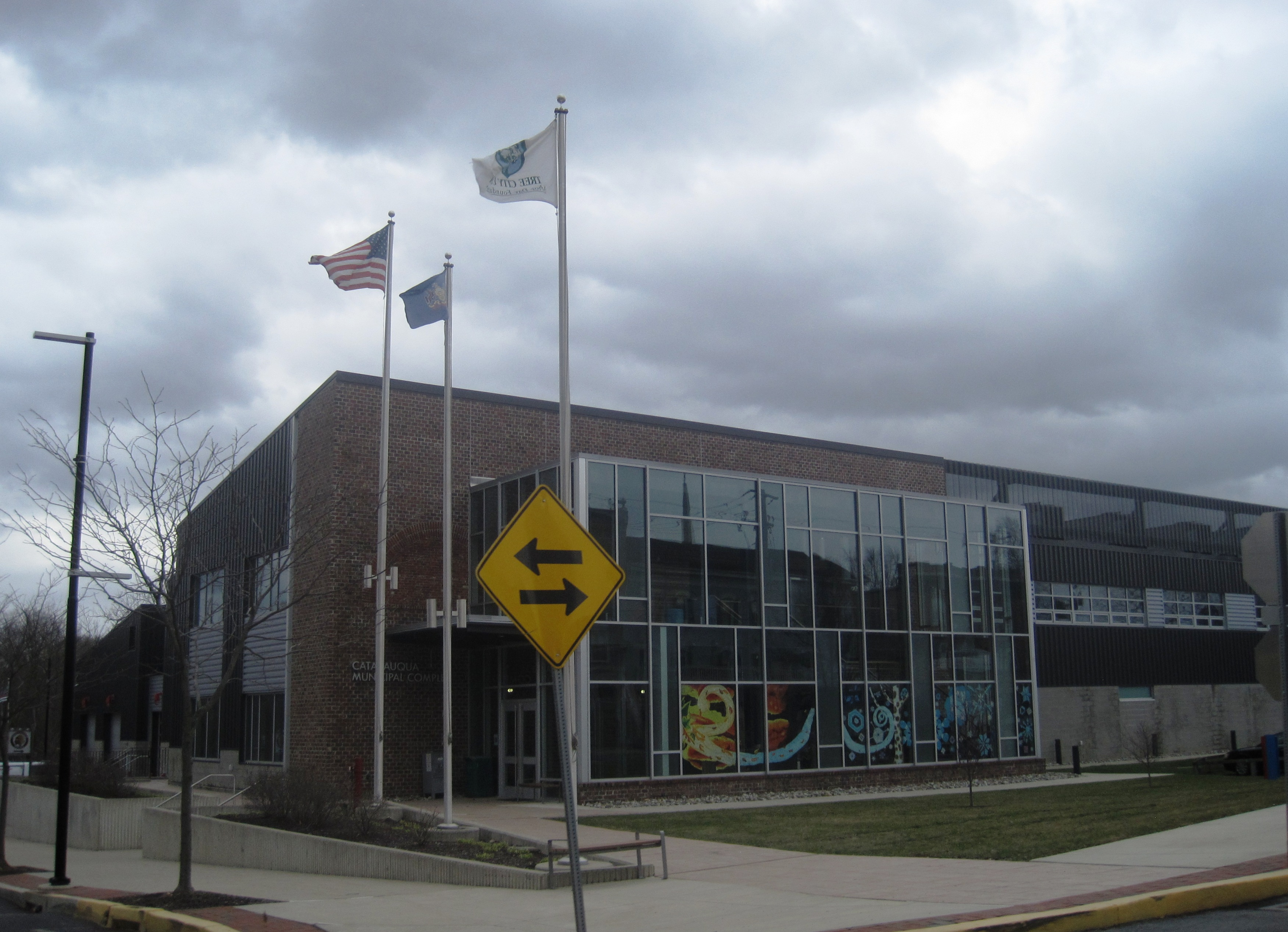
Catasauqua Municipal Complex

== History ==
=== 18th century ===
George Taylor, signer of the Declaration of Independence, built a Georgian stone house in 1768 in what is now Catasauqua. The George Taylor House has been named a National Historic Landmark, a showpiece of the community's rich historical heritage. At the time, the area of present-day Catasaqua was referred to as Biery's Port.

=== 19th century ===
In 1840, the anthracite iron industry was found in Biery's Port in present-day Catasaqua, making Catasaqua a birthplace of the American Industrial Revolution. Welsh immigrant David Thomas relocated to the area and opened the Crane Iron Works. The Catasauqua and Fogelsville Railroad existed to transport ore from limonite deposits to the plant. Remembered as "the father of Catasauqua," Thomas initially named the community Craneville after his former employer in Wales. The wealthy, generous Thomases were responsible for many sweeping changes to the prosperity of the community. David Thomas founded the Presbyterian Church of Catasauqua, in which residents still worship today, and his wife Elizabeth donated money and land to found the Welsh Congregational Church, which no longer exists. Thomas organized Catasauqua's first fire company, installed its first public water system, and served as its first burgess.

In 1854, the town was formally titled Catasauqua (pronounced "Cat-uh-SAW-kwuh"), derived from the Lenape language, and meaning "dry ground" or "thirsty ground." By 1900, Catasauqua boasted 5,000 residents, and had the highest percentage of self-made millionaires of any town in the United States.

=== 20th century ===
In 1917, while many of the young men of the town served in World War I, Catasauqua became the first community in the United States to raise $1 million in war bonds, earning it the nickname "The Million Dollar Town".

=== 21st century ===
Catasauqua observed its 150th anniversary of incorporation in 2004. In July 2014, the town also celebrated its 100th anniversary of the old home week celebration in 1914. The original old home week marked the 75th anniversary of the town's Lehigh Crane Iron Company.

Catasauqua is home to two different neighborhoods listed on the National Register of Historic Places: Biery's Port, located along the Lehigh River and named for an early family of prominence, and a neighborhood known as "the mansion district," which includes Victorian homes once owned by wealthy Catasauqua residents.

== Education ==
Catasauqua is served by the Catasauqua Area School District and maintains three public schools: Sheckler Elementary (grades k-4), Catasauqua Middle School (grades 5–8), and Catasauqua High School (grades 9–12). The district also serves parts of Hanover Township and North Catasauqua.

== Transportation ==
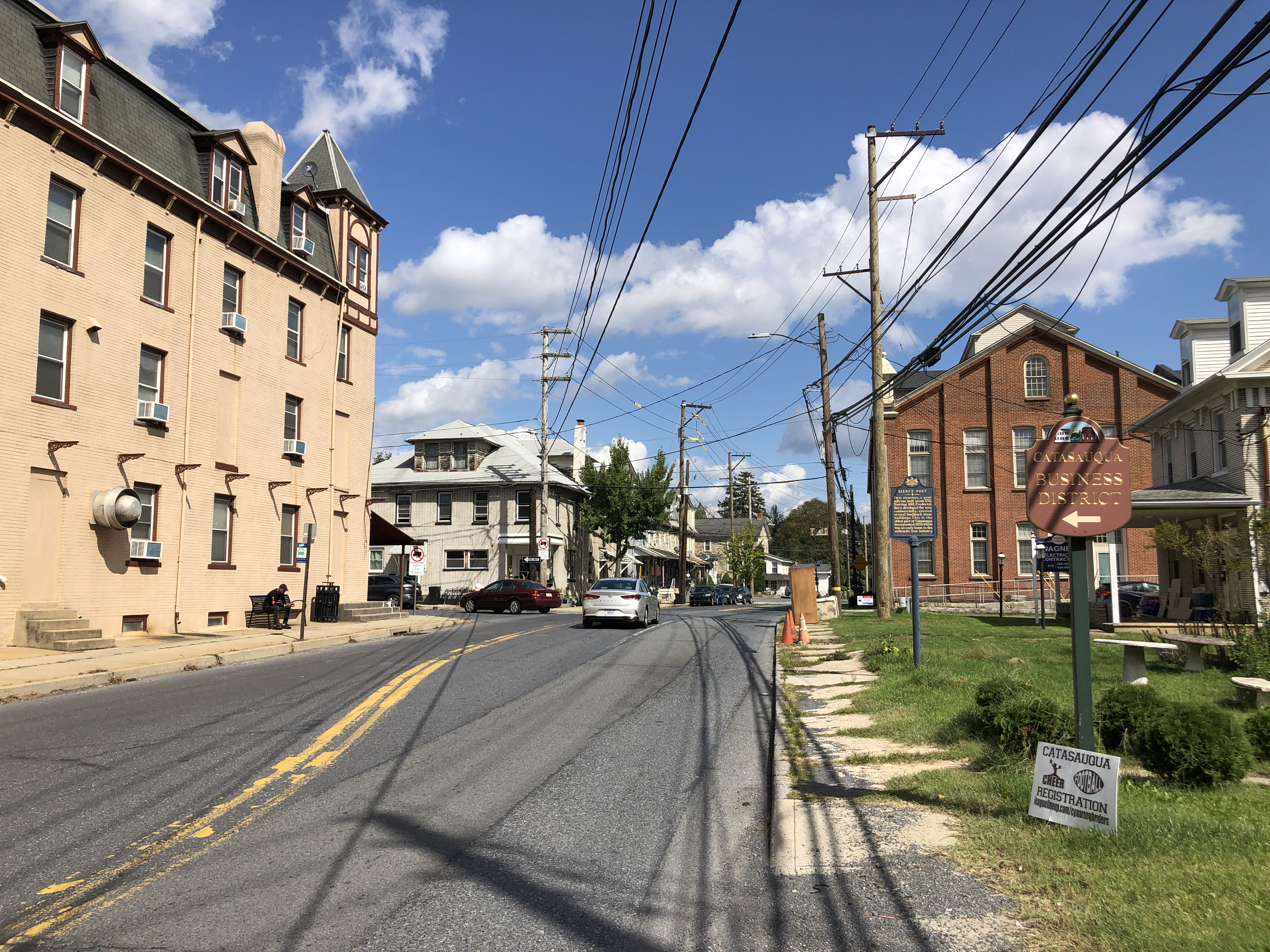
Race Street in Catasauqua

As of 2019, there were 20.18 miles (32.48 km) of public roads in Catasauqua, of which 1.66 miles (2.67 km) were maintained by the Pennsylvania Department of Transportation (PennDOT) and 18.52 miles (29.81 km) were maintained by the borough.

The main thoroughfares through the borough are Race Street, Lehigh Street, and Howerton Road.

== Notable people ==
- Buck Freeman, former professional baseball player, Boston Americans, Boston Beaneaters, and Washington Senators
- Conner Habib, novelist, podcaster, and former pornographic film actor
- Pat Kelly, former professional baseball player, New York Yankees, St. Louis Cardinals and Toronto Blue Jays
- Bert Kuczynski, former professional baseball player for Philadelphia Athletics and former professional football player for Detroit Lions and Philadelphia Eagles
- Jonathan Linton, former professional football player, Buffalo Bills
- Thomas Lynch, World War II P-38 fighter pilot and Quadruple Ace of the 39th Fighter Squadron, 35th Fighter Group
- Larry Miller, former professional basketball player for Carolina Cougars, Los Angeles Stars, San Diego Conquistadors, Utah Stars and Virginia Squires
- Anthony Recker, former professional baseball player, Atlanta Braves, Chicago Cubs, New York Mets, and Oakland Athletics
