= Jonathan Linton =

American football player (born 1974)

No. 35
- Positions: Running back, fullback

Personal information
- Born: November 7, 1974 (age 51); Allentown, Pennsylvania, U.S.
- Listed height: 6 ft 1 in (1.85 m)
- Listed weight: 234 lb (106 kg)

Career information
- High school: Catasauqua (Northampton, Pennsylvania)
- College: North Carolina
- NFL draft: 1998: 5th round, 131st overall pick

Career history
- Buffalo Bills (1998–2000); Tennessee Titans (2001)*
- * Offseason or practice squad member only

Awards and highlights
- Second-team All-ACC (1997)

Career NFL statistics
- Rushing yards: 1,002
- Rushing average: 3.5
- Receptions: 33
- Receiving yards: 246
- Total touchdowns: 8
- Stats at Pro Football Reference

Jonathan C. Linton (born November 7, 1974) is an American former professional football player who was a running back with the Buffalo Bills of the National Football League (NFL). He played college football for the North Carolina Tar Heels.

== Early life and education ==
Linton was born in Allentown, Pennsylvania, on November 7, 1974, and played high school football at Catasauqua High School in Catasauqua, Pennsylvania. He played collegiately for the University of North Carolina in Chapel Hill, North Carolina.

== National Football League ==
Linton was selected in the fifth round of the 1998 NFL draft by the Buffalo Bills. He played for the Bills in the 1998, 1999, and 2000 seasons.
