= Catasauqua Area School District =

School district in Pennsylvania

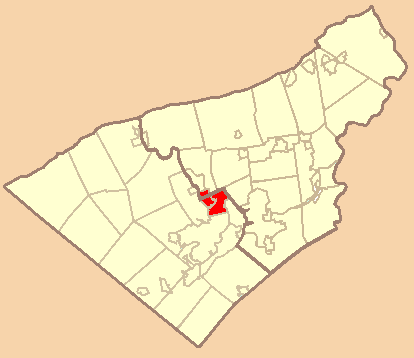
- Location of the Catasauqua Area School District in Lehigh and Northampton Counties, Pennsylvania

Address
- 201 North 14th Street Catasauqua, Pennsylvania, 18032; United States

District information
- Type: Public
- Motto: Dedicated to Educational Excellence
- Grades: K-12
- Superintendent: Robert J. Spengler
- Schools: Three, including Catasauqua High School
- Budget: $41.412 million
- NCES District ID: 4205160

Students and staff
- Enrollment: 1,537 (2024-25)
- Faculty: 117.0 (on an FTE basis)
- Student–teacher ratio: 13.14
- Athletic conference: Colonial League
- District mascot: Rough Riders
- Colors: Brown and White

Other information
- Website: www.cattysd.org

Catasauqua Area School District is a school district spanning portions of two counties in the Lehigh Valley region of eastern Pennsylvania. In Lehigh County, it covers the boroughs of Catasauqua and Hanover Township. In Northampton County, it covers the borough of North Catasauqua.

The district operates Catasauqua High School in Northampton for grades nine through 12, Catasauqua Middle School in Catasauqua for grades five through eight, and Sheckler Elementary School in Catasauqua for kindergarten through fourth grade. As of the 2023–24 school year, the school district had a total enrollment of 1,537 students between all three of its schools, according to National Center for Education Statistics data.

== Construction ==
In the early 2000s, Catasauqua built a new high school in Allen Township and remodeled the former high school, changing it into the Catasauqua Middle School. The old middle school, Lincoln Middle School, was purchased by Allentown developer Abraham Atiyeh at a cost of $900,000.

== Athletic achievements ==
- 1997 Boys Baseball PIAA Class 2A State Champions
- 1988 Girls Basketball PIAA Class 2A State Champions
- Back to back Colonial League Football championships
- Back to back District 11 appearances
- District 11 Football 2A Champions (2013)

== Middle school achievements ==
=== Gifted Support Program ===
- Took 1st place at 2006 PBS Digital Innovations Contest
- Took 2nd place and 2007 PBS Digital Innovations Contest
- Took 1st place at 2007 regional Pennsylvania Middle School Computer Fair (CLIU #21)
