= Larry Miller (basketball player) =

American basketball player (1946–2025)

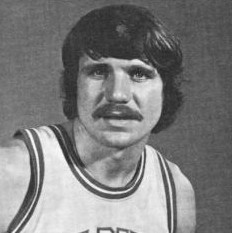
- Miller in 1972

Personal information
- Born: April 4, 1946 Allentown, Pennsylvania, U.S.
- Died: May 11, 2025 (aged 79) Bethlehem, Pennsylvania, U.S.
- Listed height: 6 ft 4 in (1.93 m)
- Listed weight: 190 lb (86 kg)

Career information
- High school: Catasauqua (Northampton, Pennsylvania)
- College: North Carolina (1965–1968)
- NBA draft: 1968: 5th round, 62nd overall pick
- Drafted by: Philadelphia 76ers
- Playing career: 1968–1975
- Position: Shooting guard
- Number: 44, 4

Career history
- 1968–1969: Los Angeles Stars
- 1969–1972: Carolina Cougars
- 1972–1973: San Diego Conquistadors
- 1973–1974: Virginia Squires
- 1974: Utah Stars

Career highlights
- ABA All-Rookie first team (1969); Consensus first-team All-American (1968); Consensus second-team All-American (1967); 2× ACC Player of the Year (1967, 1968); 2× First-team All-ACC (1967, 1968); First-team Parade All-American (1964)
- Stats at Basketball Reference
- Collegiate Basketball Hall of Fame

Lawrence James Miller (April 4, 1946 – May 11, 2025) was an American professional basketball player. In 2002, he was named to the ACC 50th Anniversary men's basketball team as one of the 50 greatest players in Atlantic Coast Conference history.

An All-American star at Catasauqua High School in the 1960s, he went on to play college basketball for the North Carolina Tar Heels, where he was named ACC Player of the Year in 1966 and 1967.

From 1968 to 1975, he played professionally in the American Basketball Association with the Los Angeles Stars, Carolina Cougars, San Diego Conquistadors, Virginia Squires, and Utah Stars.

== Early life and education ==
Miller was born in Allentown, Pennsylvania, on April 4, 1946. He attended Catasauqua High School, where he was an All-American basketball player and an All-League football player before choosing to dedicate himself solely to basketball.

In high school, Miller was 6 ft 4 in (1.93 m) 215 lb (97.5 kg). He was a deft left-handed shooter and was an explosive jumper. He honed his basketball skills against professional players from the Eastern League's Allentown Jets during summers.

Miller's teams won the Lehigh Valley League Championship and District 11 regional championship in his sophomore through senior seasons. He would routinely average a triple-double in his senior season. In a January 1964 game, he had 37 points, 37 rebounds, and 17 assists. In his final home game a month later, he scored 65 points. In the 1964 Pennsylvania state playoffs at the Hershey Arena, Miller scored 46 of his team's 66 points, while also grabbing 20 rebounds, during his team's 66–62 win over Steelton High. During Catasauqua playoff games in Hershey and Harrisburg, Miller's team would draw 10,000 fans to their games.

In 1964, he was the number one college recruit in the country coming out of high school. Miller's scholastic average was 90, and he averaged 33.6 points per game on the basketball team. He received 120 college scholarship offers. Miller was such a popular player in Catasauqua and the entire Lehigh Valley region of Pennsylvania, that many local basketball fans continued to follow his career after he went to the University of North Carolina. A local Lehigh Valley radio station reached an agreement to have North Carolina basketball games broadcast to facilitate fans continuing to follow Miller's career.

As of 2024, he was the top scorer in Lehigh Valley history, with 2,722 points from 1960–64; over 500 points more than the second ranked scorer. He also had 2,062 career high school rebounds. In 2018, he was inducted into the Pennsylvania Interscholastic Athletic Association (PIAA) District XI Hall of Fame.

== College basketball ==
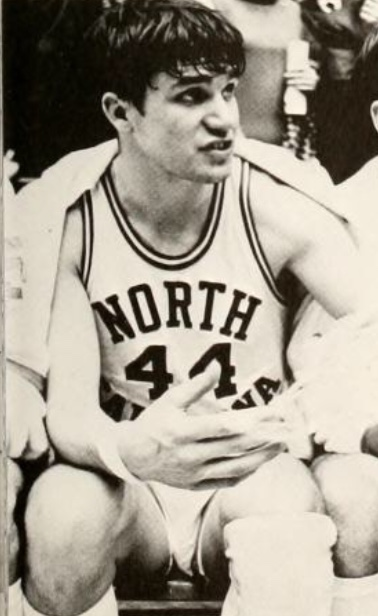
Miller playing with North Carolina in 1968

A 6 ft 4 in (1.93 m) guard and forward, Miller's final choice of where to attend college was between Michigan State, and two Atlantic Coast Conference teams, a rebuilding University of North Carolina program under coach Dean Smith and Duke University under coach Vic Bubas. Duke reached the NCAA championship game in 1964. Bubas impressed Miller by calling Miller from Kansas City, Missouri, just before Duke was about to play UCLA for the NCAA title. Miller turned down a visit to national champion UCLA and instead visited North Carolina a second time. On Miller's visits, Billy Cunningham and other Tar Heel players swayed him to choose North Carolina, where Miller played varsity basketball from 1965 to 1968.

In his sophomore year (1965-66), Miller averaged 20.9 points per game, and 10.3 rebounds per game. The team was 16–11. Miller became the leading player for North Carolina the following year (1966–67) as a junior. The team was ranked in the top 10 nationally throughout the year, won the ACC tournament, and finished with a record of 26–6. Miller averaged 21.9 points (third in the ACC) and 9.3 rebounds (fifth in the ACC) per game. North Carolina reached the Final Four of the NCAA tournament, losing to Dayton 76–62. Miller was selected the ACC Player of the Year, the ACC tournament's Most Valuable Player, and first-team All-ACC. He was selected to the East All-Region Team in the NCAA tournament. Nationally, he was named a second-team All American.

As a senior (1967-68), the Tar Heels were 28–4, won the ACC tournament, and reached the NCAA tournament's final game against UCLA, losing 78–55. During the year, Miller averaged 22.4 points (second in the ACC), and was again named ACC Player of the Year, ACC tournament MVP, and first team All-ACC. He was selected to the NCAA East All-Regional Team and to the All-Tournament Team, the other four players all being from UCLA. In 1968, Miller was selected as a consensus first-team All-American, along with future Naismith Memorial Basketball Hall of Fame members Kareem Abdul-Jabbar, Pete Maravich, Wes Unseld, and Elvin Hayes; one of the greatest college All-American teams. He received the Patterson Medal from North Carolina in 1968.

== Professional basketball ==
Miller was drafted in 1968 by the NBA's Philadelphia 76ers (fifth round, 62nd overall pick), but never played in that league. From 1968 to 1975, he played professionally in the American Basketball Association as a member of the Los Angeles Stars, Carolina Cougars, San Diego Conquistadors, Virginia Squires, and Utah Stars. He was a shooting guard, averaging 13.6 points per game in his career, and set the ABA record of 67 points in a game against the Memphis Pros on March 18, 1972. He made 25 of 40 field goal attempts, with 17 made foul shots, and did not have a three-point basket in that game.

His best scoring seasons were with the Cougars in 1971–72 (18.4 points per game), and his rookie year with the Stars (17 points per game). He also had his best rebounding year as a rookie (7.7 per game). During the 1972–73 season, he was coached by K.C. Jones on the Conquistadors, and the following season he was coached by Wilt Chamberlain in San Diego, until being traded to the Virginia Squires after seven games.

== Legacy and honors ==
In 2022, Miller was inducted into the College Basketball Hall of Fame. His Hall of Fame class included fellow Pennsylvania high school standout Richard "Rip" Hamilton. In 2002, Miller was named to the ACC 50th Anniversary men's basketball team as one of the fifty greatest players in Atlantic Coast Conference history. His No. 44 jersey hangs in the rafters at North Carolina's Dean Smith Center.

Miller holds the North Carolina record for scoring in double figures in 64 consecutive games. The 1966–67 and 1967–68 North Carolina teams led by Miller were Dean Smith's first two Final Four teams. As of 2022, Miller was one of three players in ACC history to be named the ACC tournament's Most Valuable Player in consecutive seasons.

== Personal life and death ==
Following his retirement from professional basketball, Miller worked in real estate construction. He returned home to Catasauqua, Pennsylvania when his mother became ill, after working in construction in Virginia and North Carolina. He was once the winner on The Dating Game, and was known during his younger years to be a ladies man. He never married or had children.

Miller was admitted to hospice care in Bethlehem, Pennsylvania, where he died on May 11, 2025, at the age of 79.
