= Pat Kelly (infielder) =

American baseball player (born 1967)

- Second baseman
- Born: October 14, 1967 (age 58); Philadelphia, Pennsylvania, U.S.
- Batted: Right Threw: Right

MLB debut
- May 20, 1991, for the New York Yankees

Last MLB appearance
- June 5, 1999, for the Toronto Blue Jays

MLB statistics
- Batting average: .249
- Home runs: 36
- Run batted in: 217
- Stats at Baseball Reference

Teams
- New York Yankees (1991–1997); St. Louis Cardinals (1998); Toronto Blue Jays (1999)

Patrick Franklin Kelly (born October 14, 1967) is an American former Major League Baseball infielder who played in the major leagues for nine seasons, including seven seasons with the New York Yankees, one with the St. Louis Cardinals, and one with the Toronto Blue Jays.

== Early life and education ==
Kelly was born on October 14, 1967, in Philadelphia, Pennsylvania, and attended Catasauqua High School in Northampton, Pennsylvania.

== Baseball career ==
Kelly was drafted by the New York Yankees in the ninth round of the 1988 amateur draft, but did not make his playing debut at the major league level until May 20, 1991, at the age of twenty-three.

On September 29, 1995, with the Yankees battling for the AL Wild Card, Kelly hit a crucial two-run home run in the ninth inning against the Blue Jays in Toronto to cap a Yankee rally from a 3–0 deficit in the third to last game of the season. Due to Kelly's go-ahead home run, the Yankees won the game 4–3 and were able to qualify for the playoffs two days later.

Kelly played seven seasons with the Yankees (1991–1997), spent 1998 with St. Louis Cardinals, and spent the first part of the 1999 season with the Toronto Blue Jays.

He played his final MLB game on June 5, 1999, retiring on March 22, 2000.

Kelly batted and threw right-handed. His career Major League totals were .249 batting average, 36 home runs, and 495 hits in 681 games. Kelly moved to Australia in 2001 and scouted for American baseball teams there.

In 2009, he became an assistant coach with the Australia national baseball team. He also became the general manager for the Adelaide Bite in the Australian Baseball League.

== Personal life ==
In 1994, Kelly married Rebecca Pontifex of Adelaide, Australia, who worked in public relations. His son, Jack, had a relationship with Maddie Ziegler from 2017 to 2018, and has gained a significant following on social media sites.
