= Biery's Port Historic District =

Historic district in Pennsylvania, United States

- U.S. National Register of Historic Places
- U.S. Historic district
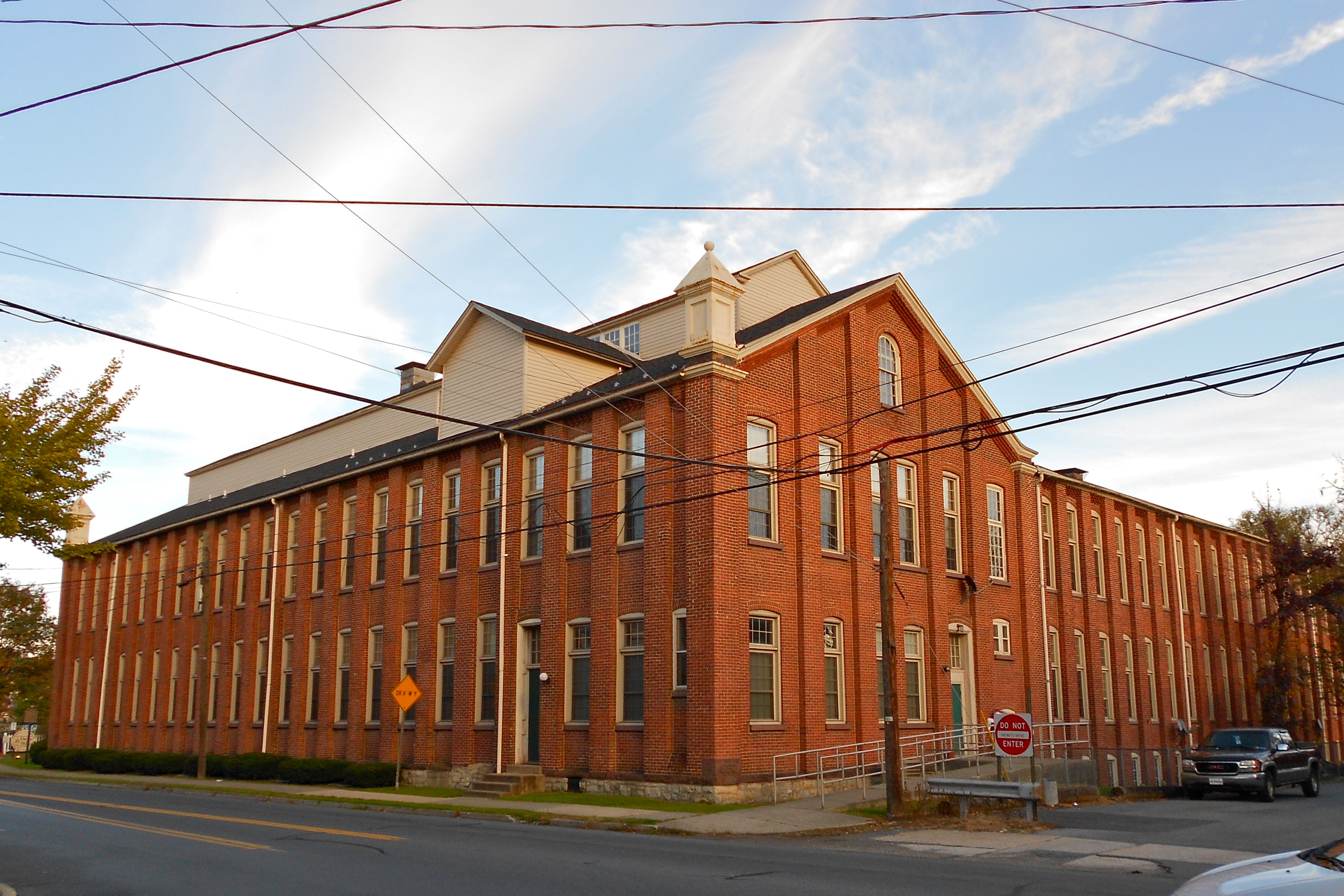
- Dery Silk Mill in the Biercy Port Historic District of Catasauqua, Pennsylvania, in October 2012

- Location within Pennsylvania Location within the United States
- Location: Roughly bounded by Pineapple, Front, Race, and Mulberry Streets, Catasauqua, Pennsylvania, U.S.
- Coordinates: 40°38′57″N 75°28′04″W
- Area: 21 acres (8.5 ha)
- Architectural style: Late Victorian
- NRHP reference No.: 84003457
- Added to NRHP: August 9, 1984

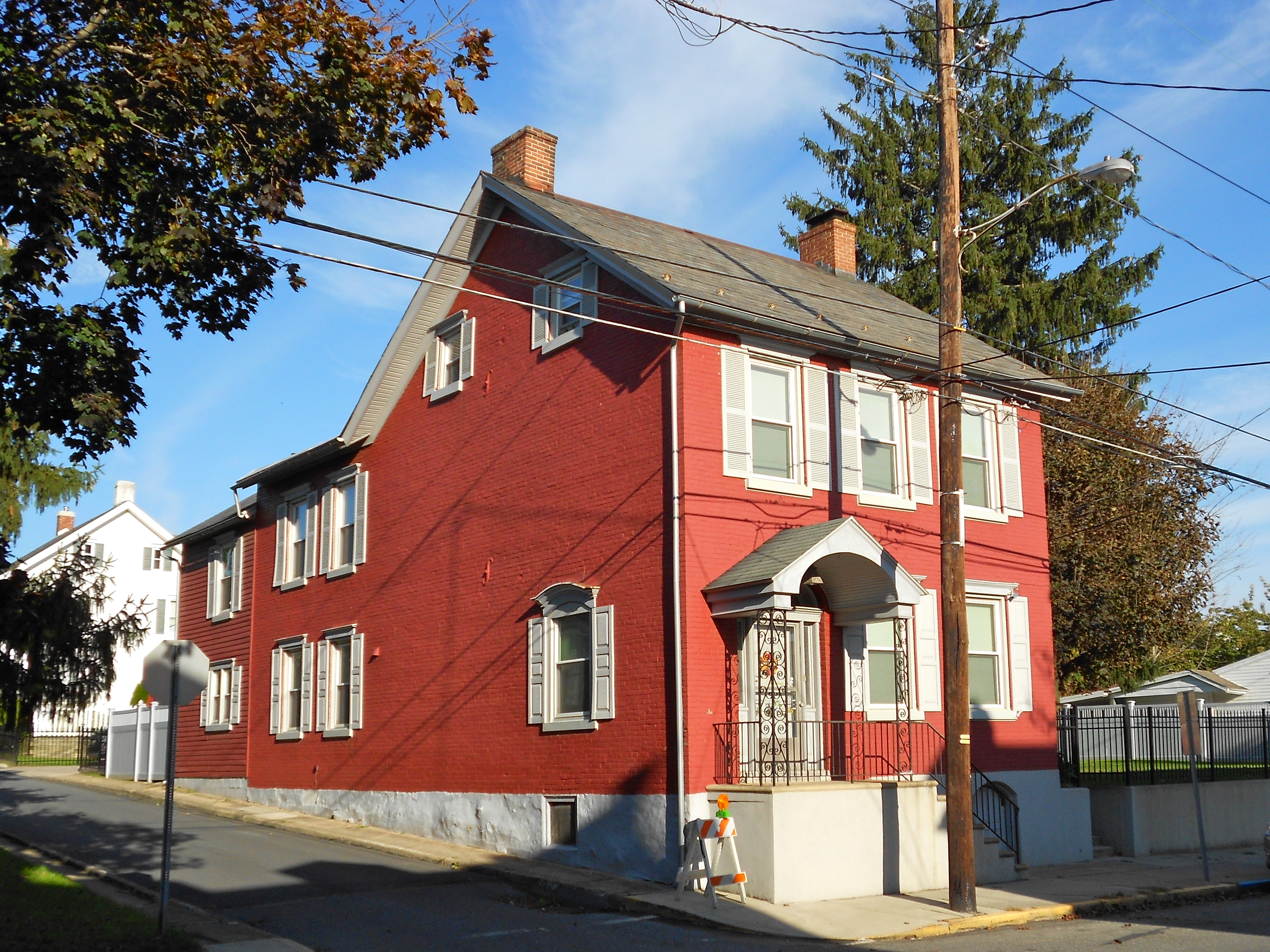
One of several houses in Biery's Port Historic District named to the National Register of Historic Places in 1984

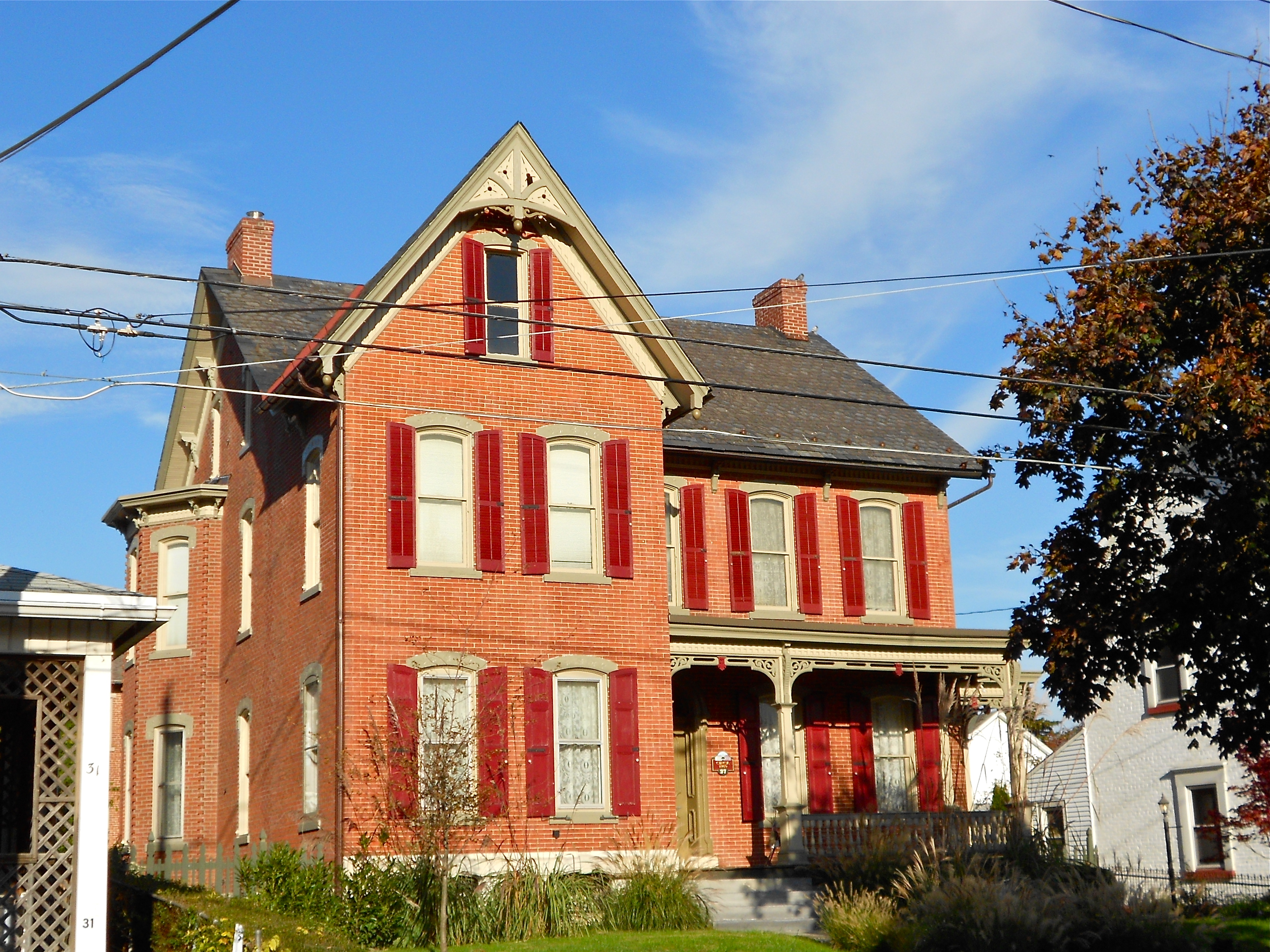
A historic house in the district

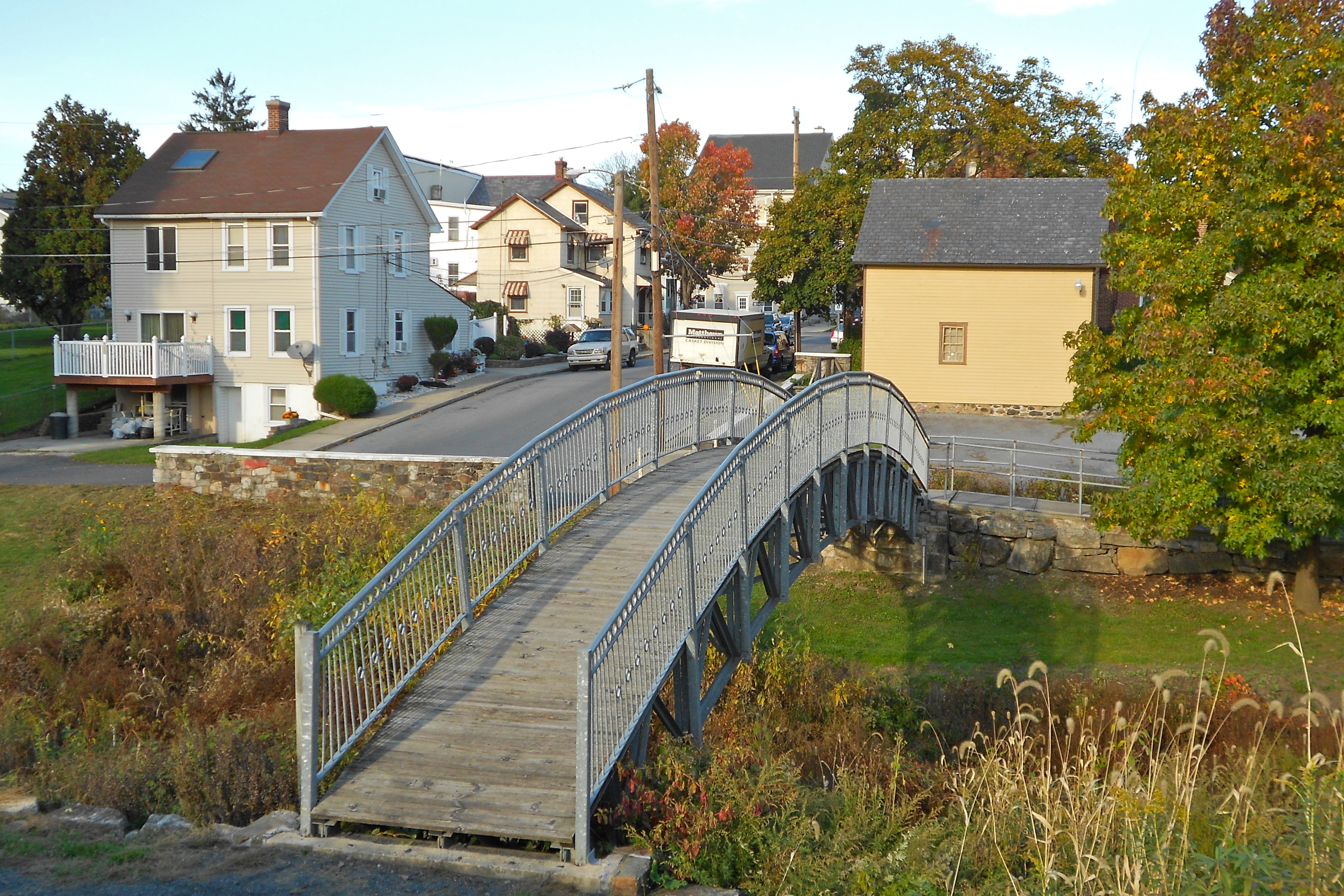
A historic canal in the district

Biery's Port Historic District is a national historic district located in Catasauqua, Pennsylvania in the Lehigh Valley region of eastern Pennsylvania. The district was added to the National Register of Historic Places in 1984 and includes 90 contributing buildings in the Biery's Port section of Catasauqua.

The district includes mainly mid- to late-19th century dwellings, and some 2 1/2-story stone dwellings built in the early 19th century by Frederick Biery. Notable non-residential buildings include the Americana Hotel (1852) and Dery Silk Mill.

== History ==
Biery’s Port is the oldest section of Catasauqua, Pennsylvania, which was initially settled in 1805.

In 1839, Catasauqua was the first community in the United States to launch anthracite iron manufacturing operations. The site of several of Catasauqua's first commercial and residential buildings, Biery's Port became "the commercial heart of a thriving town," according to historians at the Delaware and Lehigh National Heritage Corridor."

According to Lehigh Valley historian William H. Glace, David Thomas, a native of Glamorgan, Wales, who became an iron worker at age 17 and then supervisor of the blast furnaces at the Yniscedwyn Iron Works in the Swansea Valley, was recruited by Lehigh Coal and Navigation Company to erect "a furnace and run it successfully for three months by the exclusive use of anthracite coal for fuel." Lehigh Coal then "selected Biery's Port along the Canal, three miles above Allentown (later named Catasauqua) as the location for their great undertaking."

Thomas emigrated from South Wales in 1839, and subsequently rented a home in Allentown with his family after arriving on July 9, 1839, "until the two-story frame dwelling at Biery's Port was completed for them by the Crane Iron Co.," successfully completed his initial assignment for Lehigh Coal, leading to the formation of the Lehigh Crane Iron Company, which later became known simply as the Crane Iron Company, and making him a wealthy man and local philanthropist.

According to Glace, Thomas "took much interest in the political, financial, religious and charitable affairs of the town, and therefore he came to be commonly recognized as its founder," and was also "particularly concerned in the establishment and success of the First Presbyterian Church of Catasauqua, and encouraged temperance and thrift amongst the numerous workingmen under him."
