= Catasauqua High School =

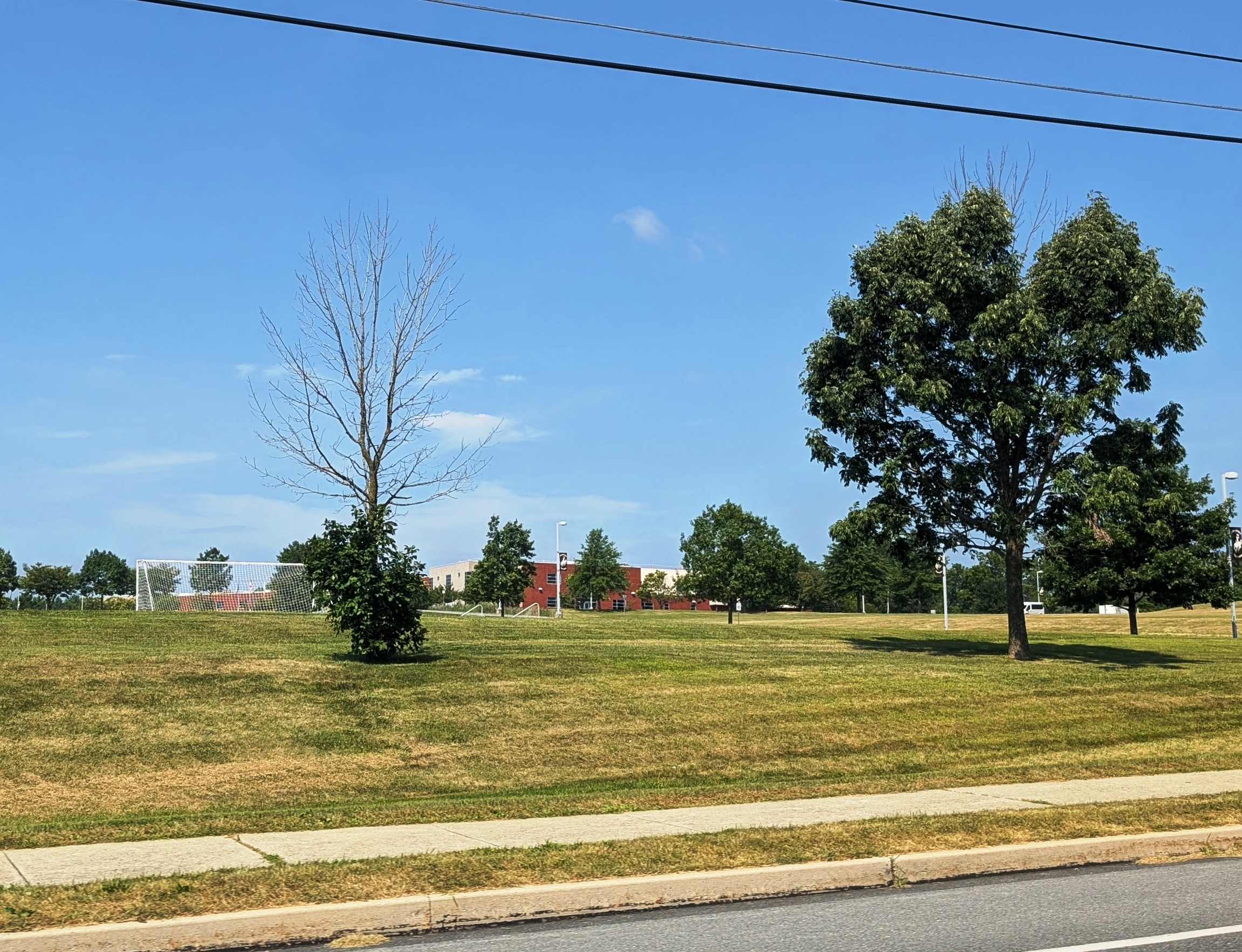
- Campus as seen from Willowbrook Road

Location
- 2500 W. Bullshead Road; Northampton, Pennsylvania 18032; United States; 40.6786°N 75.4674°W

Information
- Type: Public high school
- Motto: Dedicated to Educational Excellence
- Established: 1868; 158 years ago
- School district: Catasauqua Area School District
- NCES School ID: 420516002798
- Principal: David Todd
- Faculty: 44.8 (on an FTE basis)
- Grades: 9th–12th
- Enrollment: 467 (2024-25)
- Student to teacher ratio: 10.42
- Campus type: Large Suburb
- Colors: Brown and White
- Athletics: PIAA District XI; Class AA
- Athletics conference: Colonial League
- Mascot: Rough Rider
- Nickname: Roughies
- Rival: Northampton Area High School
- Newspaper: The Brown & White
- Yearbook: Brunalba
- Literary magazine: The Drum
- Website: chs.cattysd.org

Catasauqua High School is a public high school serving grades 9 through 12 in Northampton, Pennsylvania, in the Lehigh Valley region of eastern Pennsylvania. As of 2024–25, the school has 467 students, according to National Center for Education Statistics data.

Catasauqua High School is the only high school in the Catasauqua Area School District. The school district also includes Catasauqua Middle School, which serves grades 5 through 8, and Francis H. Sheckler Elementary School, which serves kindergarten through fourth grade.

Although Catasauqua High School is part of the Catasauqua Area School District and serves the residents of Catasauqua, Pennsylvania, the school building is physically located in the city and county of Northampton. The previous high school building, situated in Catasauqua proper, is now the middle school building. The previous middle school building, which was, in fact, the original high school building, is currently home to the Innovative Arts Academy.

== Athletics ==
The Catasauqua High School mascot is the Rough Rider, and the athletic teams are colloquially referred to as the "Roughies." The school colors are brown and white, with gold sometimes used as an accentuating third color. Catasauqua High School participates in the Class AA division of PIAA District XI and in the Colonial League for sports. The school fields teams in each of the following sports listed below.

- Fall sports
  - Football
  - Field hockey
  - Boys' soccer
  - Boys' cross country
  - Girls' cross country
  - Girls' volleyball
  - Girls' soccer
- Winters sports
  - Boys' basketball
  - Girls' basketball
  - Wrestling
- Spring sports
  - Baseball
  - Softball
  - Boys' track and field
  - Girls' track and field

The Catasauqua High School Sports Hall of Fame, a body that honors past Catasauqua High School athletes who have distinguished themselves in the local community and beyond, was created in 2004 and inducted its first members that year. A shrine in the high school's gymnasium houses a plaque and picture in recognition of each athlete inducted. The list includes notable Catasauqua High School athletes, including Larry Miller, Pat Kelly, and Jon Linton. Beginning in 2005, the body also now awards an annual scholarship to college-bound recipients for athletic accomplishments achieved.

=== List of PIAA state championships ===
==== Baseball ====
- 1997

=== Football ===
The school's football team competes in the Class AA division of PIAA District XI and in the Colonial League in the Lehigh Valley region of eastern Pennsylvania. The team plays its home games at Alumni Field in Catasauqua. In 2008, the program celebrated its 100th season of competition. In 2013 the Catasauqua-Northampton game played its game on a neutral site at Muhlenberg College.

==== List of football championships ====
- Lehigh Valley League
  - 1927, 1928, 1929, 1930, 1931, 1932, 1933, 1934, 1936, 1941, 1943, 1944
- Colonial League
  - 1975, 1976, 1981, 1982, 1983, 1986, 1991, 1992, 1994, 1995, 1996, 2012, 2013
- District XI
  - 1990, 1991, 1992, 2013
- Eastern Conference
  - 1996, 1997, 2002

==== Thanksgiving Day rivalry ====
Annually on Thanksgiving Day, the Catasauqua Rough Riders play a non-league game against their rival, the Northampton High School. The game is not sanctioned and does not count as a win or loss for official standings with regard to playoff consideration within the PIAA. The game is always considered to be homecoming for Catasauqua, regardless of whether the game is played at home or away. These two high schools from neighboring towns first played each other in 1925, and the game ended in a controversial victory for Catasauqua. A rematch was challenged by Northampton and scheduled for Thanksgiving Day to decide the outcome, as that was the only available day on the calendar. Catasauqua won both games in the first year. In 1926, once again, the two schools met, and again the game ended in a controversial victory, this time for Northampton. Catasauqua challenged a rematch, and once again, they met on Thanksgiving Day to decide the outcome. Northampton won both games in the second year.

Beginning in 1927, the game was agreed to be played on Thanksgiving Day from the season's onset. A tradition was born, and the game has been played every year since. Both schools and their respective communities have developed a bitter rivalry toward each other. For a number of years through 1968, the Catasauqua–Northampton game was played on a neutral site, often at Scotty Wood Stadium on the campus of Muhlenberg College in Allentown. Beginning in 1969, the games were held alternately at the teams' home fields until 2013, when the game was again played at Muhlenberg. In the most recent game, in 2025, Northampton beat Catasauqua.

==== Girls' basketball ====
- 1988

== Student media ==
- Newspaper: The Brown & White
- Literary/Art Magazine: The Drum
- Yearbook: Brunalba

== Notable alumni ==
- Mike Bundra, former professional football player, Cleveland Browns, Detroit Lions, Minnesota Vikings, and New York Giants
- Pat Kelly, former professional baseball player, New York Yankees, St. Louis Cardinals, and Toronto Blue Jays
- Jon Linton, former professional football player, Buffalo Bills
- Thomas J. Lynch, former Army Air Forces lieutenant colonel, flying ace of World War II, and Distinguished Service Cross recipient
- Ruth McVey, co-author, Cornell Paper
- Larry Miller, former professional ABA basketball player, Carolina Cougars, Los Angeles Stars, San Diego Conquistadors, Utah Stars, and Virginia Squires
- Anthony Recker, former professional baseball player, Arizona Diamondbacks, Atlanta Braves, New York Mets, and Oakland Athletics

== Notable faculty ==
- Ben Wolfson, former head football coach, Lafayette College and Moravian College
