= Anthracite iron =

Substance created by the smelting together of anthracite coal and iron ore

Anthracite iron or anthracite pig iron is iron extracted by the smelting together of anthracite coal and iron ore, that is using anthracite coal instead of charcoal in iron smelting. This was an important technical advance in the late-1830s, enabling a great acceleration of the Industrial Revolution in the United States and in Europe.

== History ==
Unlike many seminal advances, the contributors, place and date of this epoch are well recorded within specific moments in the late 1830s. The first repeatable and reliably successful furnaces and smelts were managed by the same person in both the United Kingdom and the United States, in the principal control and supervision of ironmaster David Thomas, who began experimenting with attempts to use locally available Welsh anthracite deposits as early as 1820 soon after he became in charge at Yniscedewin Iron Works in Wales.

Around this 1837-38 timeframe, experiments were also being made in Pennsylvania near Port Carbon and in present-day Jim Thorpe, but with overall better success than in Wales. Lehigh Coal & Navigation Company (LC&N) and their two founders, Josiah White and Erskine Hazard, began systematic experiments to smelt using anthracite in two furnaces in Jim Thorpe in 1832–1837 with intermittent, but sporadically improved successes using cold blast processes with two differently designed furnaces.

While this preliminary work was being done on both sides of the Atlantic, another brain [in Scotland] was at work, which furnished the key that unlocked the secret to success, by Mr. Neilson of Glasgow, the inventor of the hot-blast, who in 1828 obtained a patent for his valuable invention, the importance of which was not realized for a long time. The pamphlet on the hot-blast, issued by Neilson, was eagerly read by Mr. Thomas, who was at once convinced of the value of the discovery.

One evening, while sitting with Mr. Crane in his library, talking the matter over, he took the bellows and began to blow the anthracite fire in the grate. "You had better not, David," said Mr. Crane; "you will blow it out." And Thomas replied, "If we only had Neilson's hot-blast here, the anthracite would burn like pine." Mr. Crane said, "David, that is the idea precisely," and this idea both recognized as one which would bear working out; and through Mr. Thomas's indomitable pluck and perseverance it succeeded.

In fact, this was the origin of the successful application of the hot-blast in making iron with anthracite. In the meantime the Clyde iron-works, in Scotland, had put a furnace in operation, using the hot-blast with semi-bituminous coal in the furnace. Mr. Thomas urged upon Mr. Crane the immediate adoption of the new discovery, and he was sent to Scotland to see how the process worked. After the most careful examination, Mr. Thomas determined that the hot-blast was just what was wanted for an anthracite furnace. He returned to Yniscedwin with a license from Mr. Neilson, and an expert mechanic who understood the construction of heating ovens, and at once proceeded to construct hot-blast ovens, and erected them at the furnace which was known as the 'Cupola furnace,' 11 feet bosh by 45 feet high. The furnace was blown in, February 5, 1837; the success was complete; and anthracite-iron continued to be profitably made from said furnace without intermission [thereafter].

Anthracite-iron was a new-born commodity in the commerce of the world, and David Thomas was its godfather. The news of his success spread over the United Kingdom; the London Mining Journal gave it great prominence; and an account of the discovery appeared in the press of the United States.

— Samuel Thomas, Transactions of the American Institute of Mining Engineers (1899)

After experimenting for nearly a decade in two cold blast furnaces built in present-day Jim Thorpe, Pennsylvania, LC&N Co.'s White and Hazard went recruiting in Wales after news reached them Anthracite pig iron was regularly and reliably being produced in George Crane's Yniscedwyn Iron Works, by David Thomas. Catasauqua Creek, about six miles below the Lehigh Gap and 14–15 miles (23–24 km) from the company offices in Mauch Chunk, now known as Jim Thorpe, was chosen for a new joint venture by LC&N and David Thomas, the Lehigh Crane Iron Works. After building infrastructure, including a firebrick works, a second blast furnace was under construction when on July 4, 1840, the first hot blast furnace in North America produced Anthracite pig iron, a necessary precursor to creating wrought iron and cast iron.

The first American smelt of anthracite pig iron was performed July 4, 1840 by principal-partners David Thomas, Josiah White and Erskine Hazard at their Lehigh Crane Iron Works in their first hot blast furnace along Catasauqua Creek aided by Samuel Thomas and the employees of the LCIW, in what became Catasauqua, Pennsylvania in the Lehigh Valley region of eastern Pennsylvania. The technology enabled industries the chance to produce cast iron sufficient to demand and eventually adapt production to also feed the demand to generate wrought iron and steel. These useful materials are achieved by adding additional processing—by taking pig iron as an ingredient into a reverberatory furnace (and in later years, a Bessemer converter).

Anthracite, also known as stone coal or rock coal, is very difficult to ignite, mine, clean, and break into smaller chunks and requires correct conditions to build heat or hold temperature and sustain burning—which often depend upon the size and uniformity of the coal particles. Yet American cities were cramped for fuels, woodlands were exhausted near bigger towns and Philadelphia, the largest city in America, also needed fuels for mills and foundries to sustain manufacturing. Inventor and industrialist Josiah White (owner of a wire mill, foundry and nail factory), had determined how to burn anthracite in iron working processing furnaces during the War of 1812, but its use in smelting operations was hit or miss, dependent upon the material packing geometries of any particular charging load in a cold blast furnace. The earlier development of coking of bituminous coal, as well as anthracite coke enabled the smelting of iron using local coal sources with cold blast air in blast furnaces after the latter 1830s allowed the production of vast quantities of iron that established the fundamental infrastructure of the early North American Industrial Revolution, which was built on iron products and only some steel. At the time, iron was used minimally with respect to wood. Even most railroad tracks were laid with wooden rails, sometimes covered by iron strapping. As more iron became available, more uses were found for it, creating a cycle of increasing demand, experimentation and improvements as part of the Industrial Revolution.

== Development of the process ==
During the United States' first energy crisis, stands of forest near larger towns and America's Eastern Seaboard cities became further and further from population and factory centers, raising the price of fuel for heating and smithies, especially clean burning charcoal—long the fuel of preference for smelting and glass making, creating a decades long search for alternative fuels. By mid-1792, prominent Philadelphians had formed the Lehigh Coal Mine Company (LHCM Co.) to bring anthracite to cities reachable via the Delaware River Valley, especially Philadelphia, the nation's largest and most industrialized city at the time, though no one fully understood how to use anthracite as a sole fuel—just that it 'could' burn 'some' of the time with a hot enough base fire, so could augment furnace fuels.

The LHCM Co. had great difficulty getting many ark-loads of coal to the docks in Philadelphia, much less having capabilities to make reliable deliveries of the fuel to industries risking its use for the 46–47 miles (74–76 km) trip from Lausanne along the Lehigh River's variable water height and many rocks and rapids then surviving the over 70 miles (110 km) on the equally untamed Delaware River. In the midst of the War of 1812, iron industry magnate Josiah White set his foremen to systematically conducting experiments as how stone coal could be made to burn reliably. It was recognized as some use aiding other fuels, and pack animal loads occasionally reached the city, which had mills and foundries desperately needing to circumvent the British Naval Blockade, so Bituminous Coal coastal shipments up from Virginia might resume. These experiments established a bottom draught, and closed doors were the key.

Before the war, Baltimore, Boston, Newark, New Haven, New York City, and Philadelphia industrialists were importing bituminous via shipload from Virginia and Great Britain, and these supplies became difficult to obtain or blocked politically by the war and its preceding embargoes on British goods. After the war, the sanctions continued until various boundary disputes were resolved as far away as The Oregon Country and the Columbia River basin.

=== Historical backdrop ===
Between 1814 and 1818, industries along the Eastern seaboard were still thirsting for energy relief when inquiries to the LHCM Co. by Hazard and White indicated the operation and rights of the company were available. Frustrated by the sluggish progress of improvements that would become the Schuylkill Canal, White and Hazard applied to the Pennsylvania legislature for the rights to improve and operate navigations upon the rapids-strewn Lehigh River. This initiated the process that lead to the Lehigh Canal, which was the beginning of regular high volume and reliable coal deliveries in late 1820. The flood of anthracite proved influential in the industrialization of the next century.

=== Iron from Anthracite smelting ===
Research into the smelting of iron using anthracite coal (without coking it first) began in the 1820s in Wales by Thomas, experiments in France, most notably by Gueymard and Robin at Vizille in 1827, and in the 1830s in Pottsville and Jim Thorpe, Pennsylvania. Early attempts tried to gradually substitute anthracite for other fuels, such as coke or charcoal, but all failed due to the use of cold blast techniques, which generated insufficient heat to keep the anthracite in regenerative combustion. In the same timeframe, Thomas had also continued experimenting with mixes of Anthracite and other fuels, before he combined those experiments and the new hot blast processing.

Mr. Thomas determined that the hot-blast was just what was wanted for an anthracite furnace. He returned to Yniscedwin with a license from Mr. Neilson, and an expert mechanic who understood the construction of beating ovens, and at once proceeded to construct hot-blast ovens, and erected them at the furnace which was known as the 'Cupola furnace,' 11 feet bosh by 45 feet high. The furnace was blown in, February 5, 1837; the success was complete, and anthracite-iron continued to be profitably made from said furnace without intermission.

Anthracite-iron was a new-born commodity in the commerce of the world, and David Thomas was its godfather. The news of his success spread over the United Kingdom; the London Mining Journal gave it great prominence, and an account of the discovery appeared in the press of the United States.

In May 1837, Solomon W. Roberts of Philadelphia came to Yniscedwin, saw the furnace in operation, and at once reported to his uncle, Josiah White, of the Lehigh Coal and Navigation Company, the successful application of the hot blast there. At this time, 1837-38, the Lehigh Coal & Navigation Company, and other companies whose splendid mines cluster in the neighborhood of Mauch Chunk, Pa., were experimenting in the use of anthracite in the blast-furnace, but with such small success that it was determined to send Mr. Erskine Hazard, one of the leading spirits of the company, and afterwards the leading spirit of the Lehigh Crane Iron Company, over to Wales, to investigate, the practice at Yniscedwin and engage a competent person to come to this country to superintend the erection of furnaces on the Lehigh.

Mr. Hazard arrived in November 1838 and found the furnace in full and successful operation.

— Samuel Thomas, 1899 address

In the United States, where the Lehigh Coal & Navigation Company (LC&N) had begun shipping anthracite to Philadelphia in 1820 because the principles could not obtain sufficient fuels for their iron works at the 'Falls of the Schuylkill' —so had built the Lehigh Canal and taken over the works of the haphazard Lehigh Coal Mine Company—by the late 1820s having established works that were running smoothly, after building America's second operating railroad in 1827, they'd great interest in exploiting the great anthracite deposits of Schuylkill County for ironmaking, which mills foundries were their principle businesses.

The Franklin Institute, in 1830, offered a gold medal to the manufacturer of the greatest quantity of anthracite iron, and Nicholas Biddle and his associates offered a prize of $5,000 to the first individual to smelt a certain quantity of iron ore within a given time, using anthracite. The Lehigh Coal & Navigation, by then an industrial giant of the times, also offered free water power and discount rates on coal and shipping to encourage the development of the process.

The first key breakthrough occurred in 1828–29, when Scotsman James Beaumont Neilson patented the hot blast technique & process, which he had conceived in an attempt to improve the efficiency of conventionally fueled furnaces. The first person to employ the hot blast technique to anthracite smelting was Dr. Frederick W. Gesenhainer, who filed for a patent on the process in 1831 and received it in 1833. In 1836, he tried smelting anthracite iron on a practical scale at his property, Valley Furnace, near Pottsville, Pennsylvania, while in the same year White & Hazard's LC&N Co. built two experimental blast furnaces in Jim Thorpe, Pennsylvania. He produced a small quantity of iron, but due to mechanical breakdowns, could not keep the furnace in operation for more than two months. While distinguished visitors, including Governor Joseph Ritner, acknowledged his success, he sold out his share in Valley Furnace and went to New York City.

The research was proceeding along parallel lines across the Atlantic. George Crane, owner, and David Thomas, superintendent of the Yniscedwyn Iron Works, had themselves (Note: Superintendent of the Yniscedwyn Iron Works, David Thomas had operated the works for over twenty-two years when Crane bought the Iron Works, and had been experimenting with Anthracite mixes for many years.) conceived of the idea of using hot blast to smelt anthracite. Thomas was sent to Scotland to examine Neilson's installation and reproduced it at Yniscedwyn. Crane filed for a British patent on smelting iron with anthracite and hot blast in 1836 and received it in 1837. By the time the patent was sealed, Yniscedwyn was producing about 35 tons of iron using anthracite only as a fuel.

Inspired both by Geisenhainer and Crane (whose success was closely followed by the LC&N), experiments in the US continued. Baughman, Guiteau and Company used an old furnace near Jim Thorpe, Pennsylvania, to produce some anthracite iron during late 1837. They built another experimental furnace nearby, which was worked for about two months during fall and winter 1838 and for some time in 1839, but mechanical deficiencies led them to abandon the furnace at the end of 1839. In the meantime, Pioneer Furnace, in Pottsville, was blown in using anthracite fuel in 1839. It was built by William Lyman obtained the aid of a Welsh emigrant, Benjamin Perry, who was familiar with Neilson's process and the Yniscedwyn works, for the blowing-in. The furnace ran for three months on anthracite alone and fulfilled the conditions to win the $5,000 prize. In the design of Pioneer Furnace, Lyman had also been assisted by David Thomas, who had arrived in the United States in May 1839. Thomas was engaged by the LC&N to set up the Lehigh Crane Iron Company and its first furnace at Catasauqua, which went into blast in 1840, along with five other anthracite furnaces. This marked the commercial establishment of anthracite iron production in the United States.

== Decline ==
The opening of bituminous coal deposits suitable for coking in the western part of the Allegheny Plateau resulted in the gradual displacement of anthracite as a fuel. The production of coke-fired furnaces overtook that of anthracite-fired furnaces in 1875, and the last anthracite furnaces in the US, the former Lock Ridge Iron Company, converted to coke in 1914.

== Citations ==
=== Sources ===
- Fred Brenckman (1884). HISTORY OF CARBON COUNTY PENNSYLVANIA. Harrisburg, PA: J. Nungesser.

== General references ==
- Bartholomew, Ann M.; Metz, Lance E.; Kneis, Michael (1989). Delaware and Lehigh Canals (First ed.). Bethlehem, Pennsylvania: Oak Printing Company. pp. 4–5. ISBN 0-930973-09-7. LCCN 89-25150 – via Center for Canal History and Technology, Hugh Moore Historical Park and Museum, Inc., Easton, Pennsylvania.
- Bartholomew, Craig L.; Metz, Lance E. (1988). Bartholomew, Ann (ed.). The Anthracite Industry of the Lehigh Valley. Center for Canal History and Technology. ISBN 0-930973-08-9.
- Gordon, Robert B. (1996). American Iron 1607–1900. Baltimore: The Johns Hopkins University Press. ISBN 0-8018-6816-5.
- Korson, George (1960). Black Rock: Mining Folklore of the Pennsylvania Dutch. Baltimore: The Johns Hopkins Press.
