= Cold blast =

Metallurgical furnace where air is not preheated

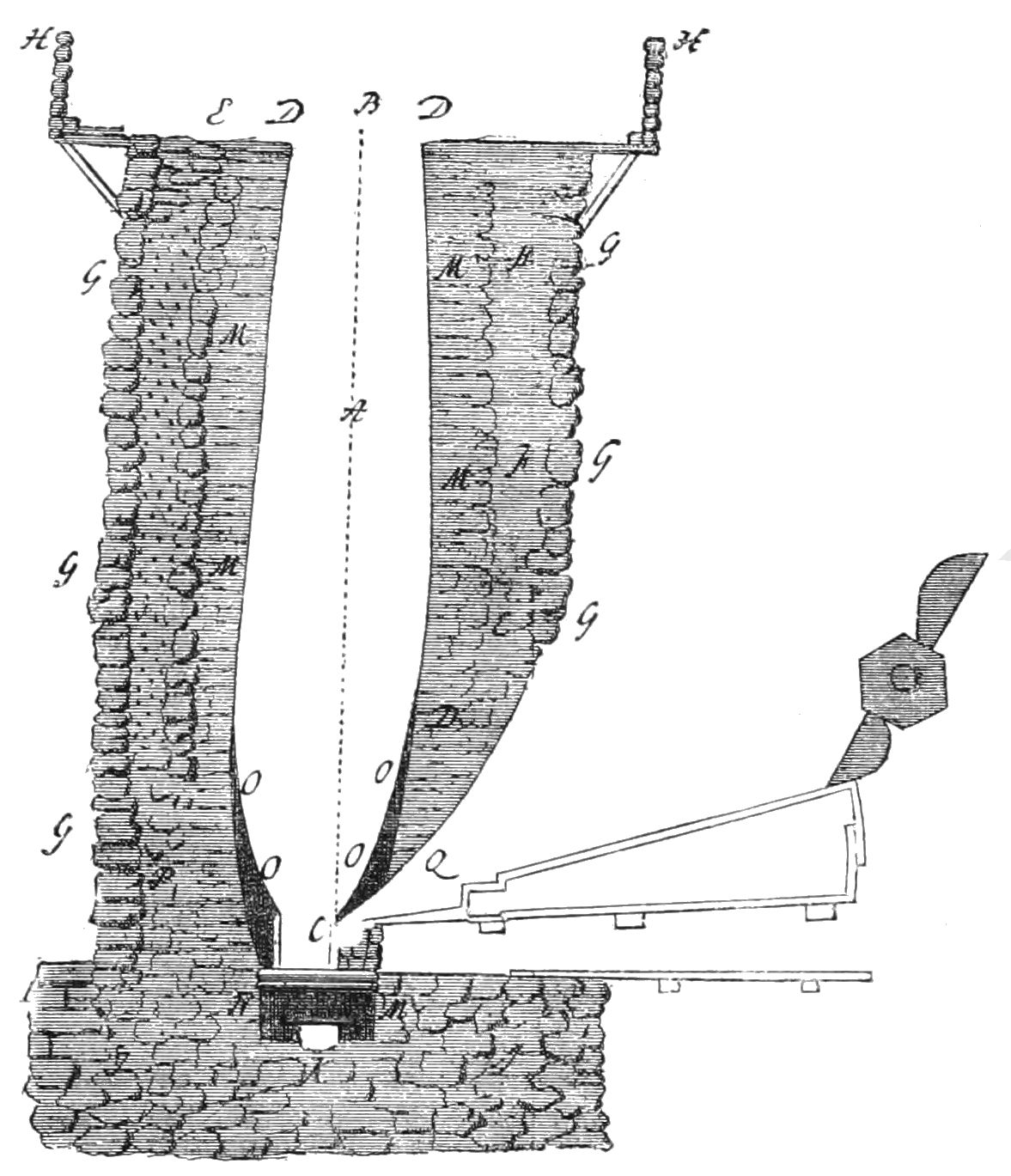
Section of a 17th and 18th century blast furnace. The bellows, at right, draw in air directly from the atmosphere.

Cold blast, in ironmaking, refers to a metallurgical furnace where air is not preheated before being blown into the furnace. This represents the earliest stage in the development of ironmaking. Until the 1820s, the use of cold air was thought to be preferable to hot air for the production of high-quality iron; this effect was due to the reduced moisture in cool winter air.

The discovery by James Beaumont Neilson in about 1825 of the beneficial effects of the hot blast led to the rapid obsolescence of cold blast ironworks in Great Britain, where hot blast was in general use by 1835. Cold blast ironworks survived longer in the United States, but the use of hot blast as a method of smelting iron with anthracite was introduced in 1836, and the increasing US production of coke gradually drove out the cold blast furnaces. However, one of the last known operating cold blast charcoal furnaces, Pleasant (formerly Eagle) Furnace, in Curtin, Pennsylvania did not close until 1921.
