= Lehigh Crane Iron Company =

Defunct ronmaking firm in the Lehigh Valley, USA

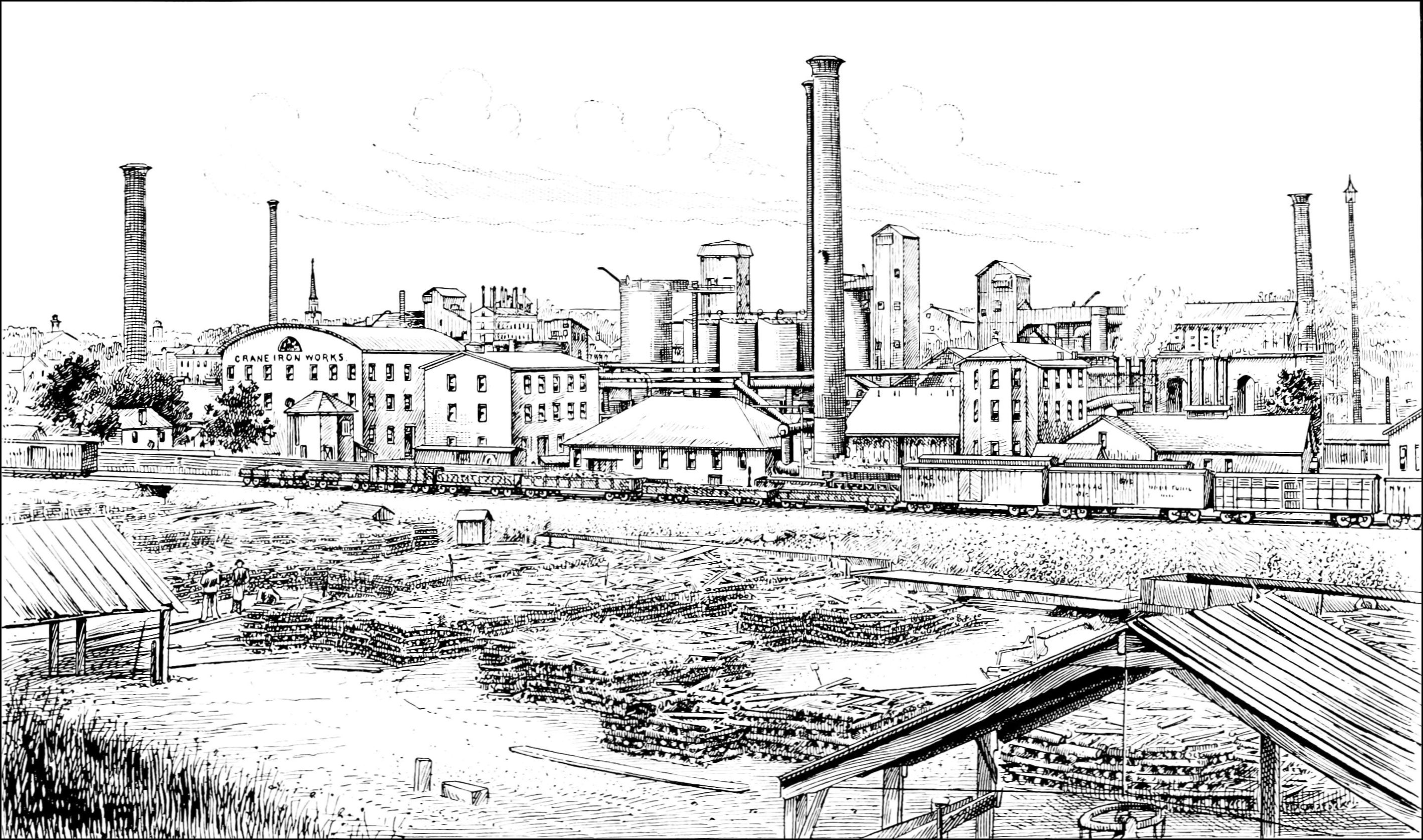
- A 1891 illustration of Crane Iron Company in Catasauqua, Pennsylvania

- Location within Pennsylvania
- 40.65208°N 75.47287°W
- Location: Front St. between Church and Wood Streets, Catasauqua, Pennsylvania, U.S.

History
- Built: 1839–1840

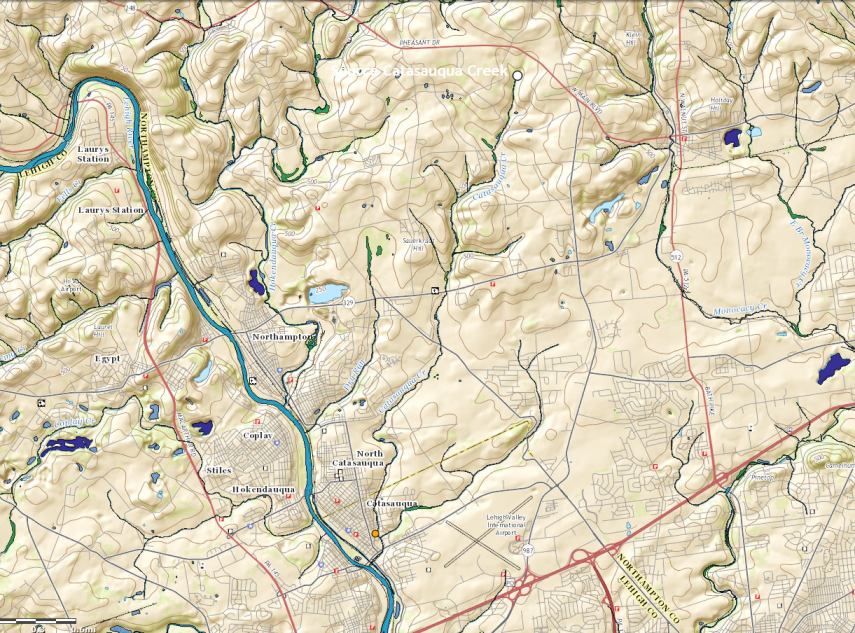
A USGS aerial view of the 6.6–7 miles (10.6–11.3 km) Catasauqua Creek Valley chosen to provide water power for the newly imported blast furnace technologies and other raw materials resources, including iron ore, firebrick clay, and limestone

The Lehigh Crane Iron Company, later renamed Crane Iron Company, was a major ironmaking firm in the Lehigh Valley from its founding in 1839 until its sale in 1899. It was based in Catasauqua, Pennsylvania, and was founded by Josiah White and Erskine Hazard, who financed its development through their Lehigh Coal & Navigation Company, which promoted the then-novel technique of smelting iron ore with anthracite coal. This was an important cost and energy savings technique, credited with eliminating the need for either expensive charcoal or coke producing processes and transport costs that proved central to the acceleration of the American Industrial Revolution.

The new company was named Crane in recognition of George Crane, a British foundry owner whose kind understanding and support backed their desire to hire away his foundry's long time superintendent, ironmaster David Thomas, who had achieved regular successes in employing the new hot blast process and successfully worked out necessary additional methods to not only smelt iron, but produce fine quality cast iron and pig iron ready to make steel. These results positioned Crane's company's strongly to dominate British steel and iron manufacturing for decades. Crane was grateful, so with a younger Thomas assistant already on hand, allowed Thomas his big chance for fortune. LC&CN's Hazard not only hired him and paid his expenses to come to America and set up an ironworks using the new technique, but made him a partner in the enterprise in a December 31, 1838 agreement.

By late winter, LC&NC was seeking suitable real estate, with water power and access to iron ores. Suitable acres were available a few miles below the Lehigh Gap in Northampton County. The company put its first furnace into blast in 1840, and quickly gained a reputation for efficiency and ironmaking prowess among the many furnaces that now sprang up in the Lehigh Valley. Over the next several decades, Crane Iron developed an extensive portfolio of assets, buying mines in the Lehigh Valley and in northern New Jersey, and taking over many of the smaller iron furnaces in the region. Crane Iron also financed the building of railroads in the area to haul limestone and iron ore to its furnaces.

As the merchant pig iron business began to decline, Crane Iron sold off much of its railroad interests in 1896. In an effort to revive Eastern iron mining in the face of competition from Minnesota, Crane took part in Thomas Edison's attempts to develop a magnetic ore beneficiation process. However, Edison's experiments proved uneconomical and the Edison Ore-Milling Company was a failure. In 1899, Crane Iron was sold to the Empire Steel and Iron Company, a conglomerate of Eastern and Southern iron furnaces. The Crane Works, as the company's plant was now known, last made iron in 1930, and the plant was torn down in 1932.

== History ==
In 1837, the Yniscedwyn Works in Wales became the first ironworks in Britain to produce anthracite iron in commercial quantities, by use of the hot blast method. The works were owned by George Crane, and superintended by David Thomas. This discovery promised to provide a large market for anthracite, and the managers of the Lehigh Coal & Navigation Company wished to duplicate the process in the United States. After negotiations with Crane and Thomas, they were able to hire Thomas to emigrate and manage their proposed ironworks. The company was named in honor of Crane: it was organized on April 23, 1839 and incorporated on May 16, 1839, under a general act of the Pennsylvania Legislature. The LC&N supported the new company by granting them land and rights to water power (from the LC&N's canal) for their furnace.

Construction of the first furnace commenced about August 1, 1839, at Biery's Port, later Catasauqua. The ovens for the hot blast were coal-fired, and the blowing engine was driven by a waterwheel tapping the canal at Lock 36. The furnace was blown in on July 3, 1840 and the first four tons of iron produced July 4, 1840. It remained in blast until flooded by a January freshet in 1841, producing 1,080 tons of iron during that period.

No. 2 Furnace was erected in 1842, using waste gas from the stack to heat the blast instead of coal-fired ovens. No. 3 was built in 1846, and Nos. 4 and 5 in 1849, as the iron business increased.

The limestone flux for the furnaces was largely shipped from local quarries. A mixture of about 75% limonite and 25% magnetite ore was used to supply the furnace. Most of the limonite was mined locally: the first batch of ore smelted at the furnace was supplied by Henry Hoch's mine in Schoenersville nearby, and the mine was an important supplier of the ironworks for years, being worked from 1840 to 1908. Some magnetite also came from the Wieand mine in Vera Cruz, but it was principally shipped from the Irondale-area, Byram, and Dickerson Mines in New Jersey. Anthracite came from the LC&N's mines, shipped by canal boat for many years, and later by rail.

=== Expansion ===
In 1855, David Thomas left his post as superintendent of the Crane Iron Company to oversee the new Thomas Iron Company. His son John Thomas succeeded him, and served until he, too, took over at Thomas Iron, and was succeeded by his brother-in-law Joshua Hunt.

The success of Crane Iron and the many other iron companies that sprang up in the Lehigh Valley led to a major mining boom in Lehigh County, with no less than 261 mines of varying size being opened.

This was in part facilitated by improved transportation in the area. The Crane and Thomas Iron Companies wanted a railroad to bring local ore to their furnaces, but faced strong local opposition when attempting to gain a charter. As a compromise, the Catasauqua and Fogelsville Railroad's plank road corporation was chartered on July 2, 1853, to build a plank road from the ore pits to the furnaces. A short section of plank road was constructed, but the exceptional weight of the ore wagons quickly destroyed it. Renewed efforts to palliate the local farmers were successful, and the plank road was renamed and rechartered on April 20, 1854 as the Catasauqua and Fogelsville Railroad. The railroad began hauling ore from the mines near Fogelsville in 1857. In 1864, it was further extended to a connection with the East Pennsylvania Railroad at Alburtis and in 1865, to the magnetite mines at Rittenhouse Gap. Improvements to the physical plant also occurred, building No. 6 stack in 1868. The company survived the Panic of 1873 and the subsequent poor iron market, and No. 5 stack was rebuilt in 1877, introducing new firebrick heat exchangers (stoves) to heat the blast, rather than the iron pipes heretofore used. No. 3 stack collapsed in 1879 while out of blast, and Nos. 1 and 2 were subsequently demolished. A new No. 1 and 3 were built, and the site of No. 2 used for stoves for the new furnaces, which were built in 1880 and put in service in 1881. Joshua Hunt resigned the superintendency on January 1, 1882, six months before the death of his father-in-law, David Thomas.

By this time, the iron furnaces also boasted a substantial plant railroad. This began with the construction of a private wagon and rail bridge, which the company opened to the public, across the Lehigh River in 1847 to facilitate ore shipment. This rail line would connect with the Lehigh Valley Railroad in West Catasauqua in 1855, as well as the C&F when that line opened. (The Central Railroad of New Jersey would build a line along the Lehigh River in 1867 on the same side as the furnaces, giving Crane Iron yet another rail inlet and outlet.) The company received a supplement to its charter on March 15, 1872, and was renamed Crane Iron Company, allowing it to construct up to 2 miles (3.2 km) of rail line to dispose of slag or connect with another railroad. The plant trackage ultimately totaled 3.31 miles (5.33 km), and was worked by a number of 0-4-0 and 0-6-0 switchers, including one built on-site at the ironworks in the 1880s.

In 1889, No. 3 stack was raised, and No. 4 went out of service in July 1890. The Crane and Thomas Iron companies leased the C&F to the Reading Railroad on December 8, 1893, and Crane Iron sold off its share to the Reading entirely from June 5, 1896, leaving the line-haul railroad business. During the 1890s, Crane Iron also participated in the experiments of Thomas Edison, who was attempting to rejuvenate the then-moribund Eastern magnetite mines by magnetic beneficiation. Initial attempts were frustrated by the dusty nature of the finely-ground ore (which made it susceptible to losses both in transit and during the furnace blast), and the process ultimately proved uneconomical in competition with cheap Mesabi Range ores, which came to replace locally-mined ore. In 1899, the company was sold to the Empire Steel and Iron Company and became their Crane Works. The works was gradually dismantled, last making iron in 1930. It was scrapped in 1932.

== See also ==
- Crane Railroad
