= David Thomas (industrialist) =

Welsh born American industrialist

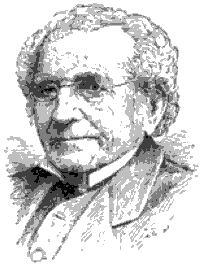
- Born: David Thomas; November 3, 1794; Cadoxton, Wales
- Died: June 20, 1882 (aged 87); Catasauqua, Pennsylvania, U.S.
- Resting place: Fairview Cemetery, West Catasauqua, Pennsylvania, U.S.
- Spouse: Elizabeth Hopkins (m. 1817)
- Engineering career
- Discipline: Ironmastery
- Projects: Production of anthracite iron

David Thomas (November 3, 1794 – June 20, 1882) was a native of Wales who was influential in the birth of the Industrial Revolution in the United States.

== Development of the hot blast ==
David Thomas was born in Cadoxton, near Neath. He went to school at nearby Alltwen and at Neath, and worked on his father's farm before going into the iron industry. He married Elizabeth Hopkins in 1817.

As an adult, he was widely regarded as one of the foremost ironmasters in the United Kingdom. It was while employed at the Yniscedwyn Works, in Ystradgynlais in the Swansea Valley, that he devised the process which would advance the Industrial Revolution. On February 5, 1837, Thomas used a hot blast to smelt iron ore and anthracite coal. The result was an easy method to produce anthracite iron, which revolutionized industry in the Swansea Valley. This type of iron had been patented by Edward Martin of Morriston, Wales in 1804.

In 1839 he relocated to Pennsylvania, where the owners of the Lehigh Coal and Navigation Company in Lehigh County wanted Thomas to build a furnace for the production of anthracite iron. The Lehigh Valley region, being rich in both anthracite coal and iron ore, was the perfect setting for Thomas's creation.

== Emigration to Pennsylvania ==
Thomas and his son, Samuel, walked into the infant community of Catasauqua, Pennsylvania, on the Lehigh Coal and Navigation Company's towpath on July 9, 1839. Less than one year later, on July 4, 1840, the first successful anthracite iron furnace in the United States began operation.

Thomas's iron works was extremely successful, even though the iron industry in the rest of the Lehigh Valley had begun to decline. The company was incorporated in 1839 as the Lehigh Crane Iron Company, and in 1872 the name was changed to the Crane Iron Company. By that time the community was no longer known as Craneville, but as Catasauqua; Thomas had named both his company and the town in which he founded it after his former employer in Wales.

Iron produced at the Crane Iron Company was used in a number of products, many of which were made elsewhere in Catasauqua. The neighbouring company of John Fritz's Iron Foundry used Crane iron to build the first American-made cast-iron construction columns, while the nearby Davies and Thomas Foundry turned Crane iron into pipes and tunnel tubes. Among the still-existing structures which were created using Crane iron are the Holland and Lincoln Tunnels in New York City.

Thomas's industry helped the small town to become quite prosperous, and he himself became a wealthy landowner.

== Philanthropy and honors ==
Thomas's wealth and generosity with it endeared him to his neighbors. He and his wife, Elizabeth, were known as "the father and mother of Catasauqua", and frequently addressed as Mother and Father Thomas.

A devout Presbyterian, Thomas founded the first church in the borough of Catasauqua, in which residents still worship. He installed its first public water system, founded its first fire company, and served as its first burgess. He provided a number of neat, attractive homes for his employees, many of which are still standing today.

Additional accolades were presented to "Father Thomas" for his transformational ideas and vision. He was named the first president of the American Institute of Mining, Metallurgical, and Petroleum Engineers (then known as the American Society of Metallurgy), and was one of the founders of the American Association of Industrial Engineers.

== Death and legacy ==
Thomas died from pneumonia in Catasauqua on June 20, 1882. He, his wife Elizabeth, and generations of their descendants are all buried in the Thomas family vault, a sort of underground mausoleum at Fairview Cemetery in West Catasauqua. The Thomas family mansion, located on Second Street in Catasauqua, is still standing, though its interior has since been divided into apartments.

In 1898, Leonard Peckitt took the reins as president of the Crane Iron Company. He proceeded to purchase a number of other companies in the region, uniting them all under the incorporation of the Empire Steel and Iron Company. Though Peckitt was a shrewd businessman, he could not hide forever the fact that the 20th century brought changes to the iron industry, and that the company was beginning to lose money. The last furnace at the Crane Iron Company ceased operation in 1921; by 1935, most of the plant had been demolished, and little remains of the company's plant today. What does still exist is in the possession of the borough of Catasauqua, which is currently working to transform it into a shopping and dining destination.

== Sources ==
- Images of America: Catasauqua and North Catasauqua by Martha Capwell Fox (Arcadia Publishing 2002)
- WelshDragon.net: Historical Wales Timeline
- Lehigh Coal and Navigation Company
- Welsh Biography Online
