= Hot blast =

Metallurgical preheating of air

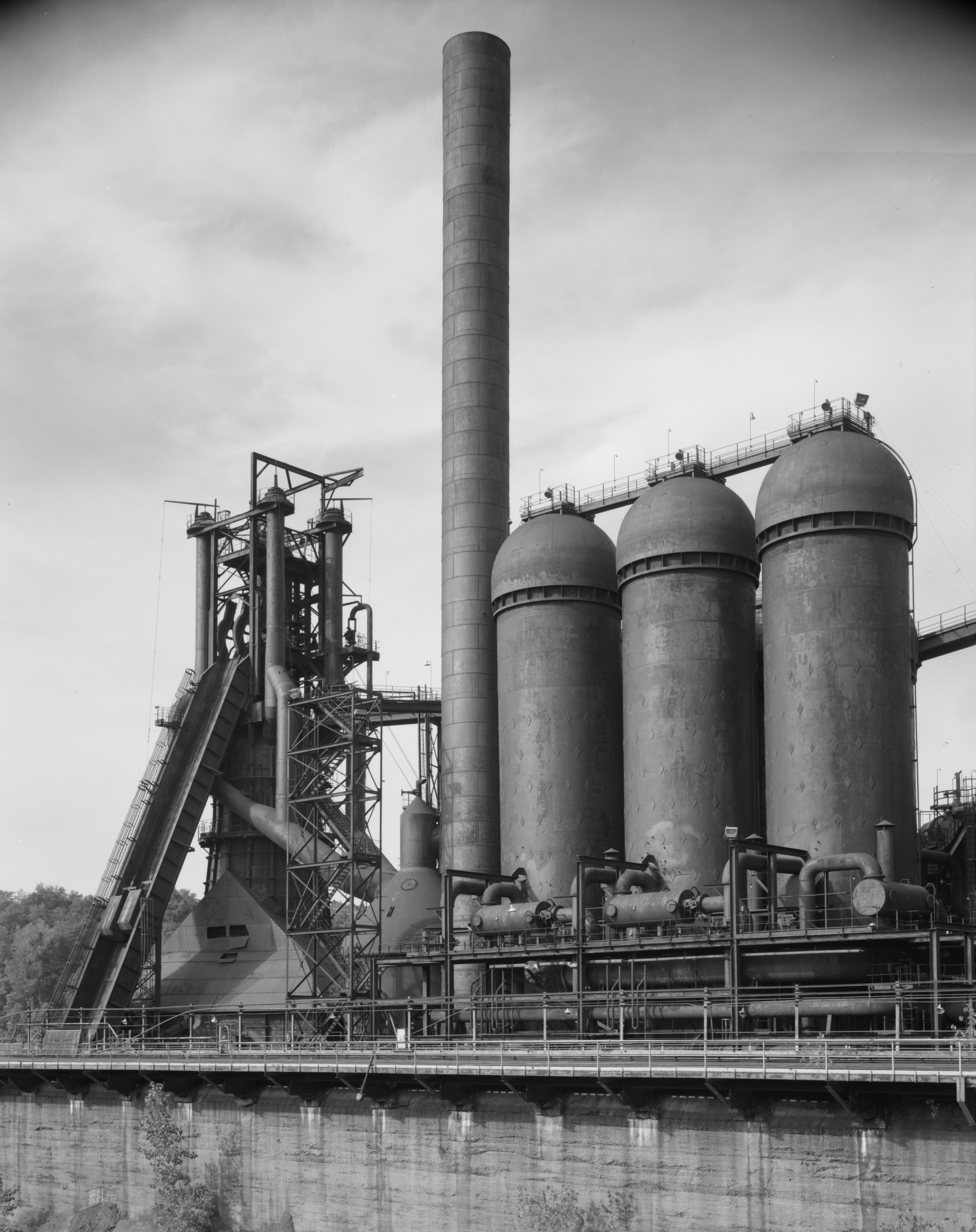
Blast furnace (left), and three Cowper stoves (right) used to preheat the air blown into the furnace.

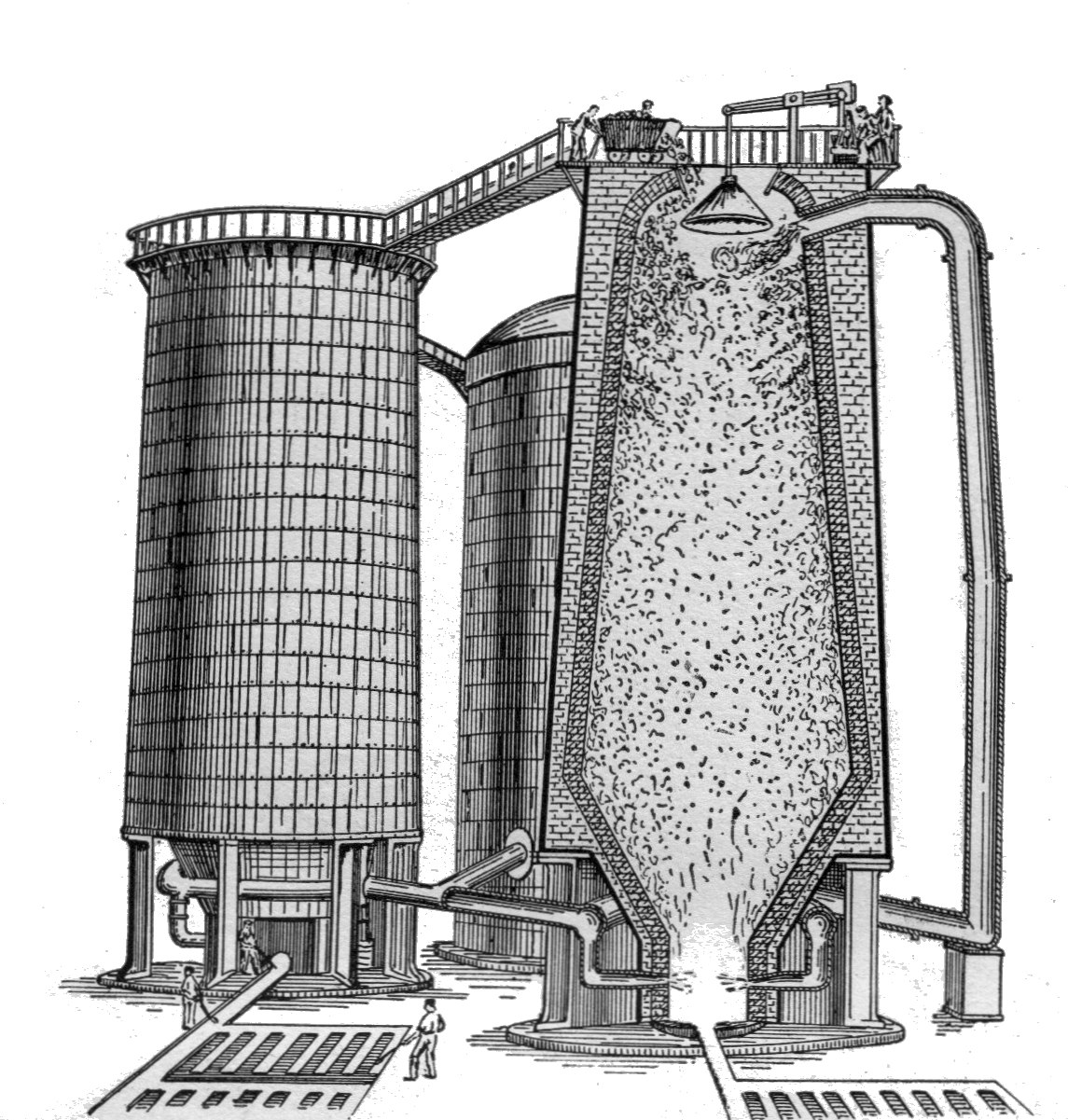
Hot blast furnace: note the flow of air from the stove in the background to the two blast furnaces, and hot air from the foreground furnace being drawn off to heat the stove.

Hot blast is the preheated air blown into a blast furnace or used in other metallurgical processes. This technology, which considerably reduces the fuel consumed, was one of the most important technologies developed during the Industrial Revolution. Hot blast also allowed higher furnace temperatures, which increased the capacity of furnaces.

As first developed, it worked by alternately storing heat from the furnace flue gas in a firebrick-lined vessel with multiple chambers, then blowing combustion air through the hot chamber. This is known as regenerative heating. Hot blast was invented and patented for iron furnaces by James Beaumont Neilson in 1828 at Wilsontown Ironworks in Scotland, but was later applied in other contexts, including late bloomeries. Later the carbon monoxide in the flue gas was burned to provide additional heat.

== History ==
=== Invention and spread ===
James Beaumont Neilson, previously foreman at Glasgow gas works, invented the system of preheating the blast for a furnace. He found that by increasing the temperature of the incoming air to 149 °C (300 °F), he could reduce the fuel consumption from 8.06 long tons (8.19 t) of coal to 5.16 long tons (5.24 t) of coal per ton of produced iron with further reductions at even higher temperatures. He, with partners including Charles Macintosh, patented this in 1828. Initially the heating vessel was made of wrought iron plates, but these oxidized, and he substituted a cast iron vessel.

On the basis of a January 1828 patent, Thomas Botfield has a historical claim as the inventor of the hot blast method. Neilson is credited as inventor of hot blast, because he won patent litigation. Neilson and his partners engaged in substantial litigation to enforce the patent against infringers. The spread of this technology across Britain was relatively slow. By 1840, 58 ironmasters had taken out licenses, yielding a royalty income of £30,000 per year. By the time the patent expired there were 80 licenses. In 1843, just after it expired, 42 of the 80 furnaces in south Staffordshire were using hot blast, and uptake in south Wales was even slower.

Other advantages of hot blast were that raw coal could be used instead of coke. In Scotland, the relatively poor "black band" ironstone could be profitably smelted. It also increased the daily output of furnaces. In the case of Calder ironworks from 5.6 long tons (5.7 t) per day in 1828 to 8.2 long tons (8.3 t) in 1833, which made Scotland the lowest cost steel producing region in Britain in the 1830s.

Early hot blast stoves were troublesome, as thermal expansion and contraction could cause breakage of pipes. This was somewhat remedied by supporting the pipes on rollers. It was also necessary to devise new methods of connecting the blast pipes to the tuyeres, as leather could no longer be used.

Ultimately this principle was applied even more efficiently in regenerative heat exchangers, such as the Cowper stove (which preheat incoming blast air with waste heat from flue gas; these are used in modern blast furnaces), and in the open hearth furnace (for making steel) by the Siemens-Martin process.

Independently, George Crane and David Thomas, of the Yniscedwyn Works in Wales, conceived of the same idea, and Crane filed for a British patent in 1836. They began producing iron by the new process on February 5, 1837. Crane subsequently bought Gessenhainer's patent and patented additions to it, controlling the use of the process in both Britain and the US. While Crane remained in Wales, Thomas moved to the US on behalf of the Lehigh Coal & Navigation Company and founded the Lehigh Crane Iron Company to utilize the process.

=== Anthracite in ironmaking ===
Hot blast allowed the use of anthracite in iron smelting. It also allowed use of lower quality coal because less fuel meant proportionately less sulfur and ash.

At the time the process was invented, good coking coal was only available in sufficient quantities in Great Britain and western Germany, so iron furnaces in the US were using charcoal. This meant that any given iron furnace required vast tracts of forested land for charcoal production, and generally went out of blast when the nearby woods had been felled. Attempts to use anthracite as a fuel had ended in failure, as the coal resisted ignition under cold blast conditions. In 1831, Dr. Frederick W. Gessenhainer filed for a US patent on the use of hot blast and anthracite to smelt iron. He produced a small quantity of anthracite iron by this method at Valley Furnace near Pottsville, Pennsylvania in 1836, but due to breakdowns and his illness and death in 1838, he was not able to develop the process into large-scale production.

Anthracite was displaced by coke in the US after the Civil War. Coke was more porous and able to support the heavier loads in the vastly larger furnaces of the late 19th century.
