= Swabia Creek =

Swabia Creek Swope Creek, Swabian Creek, Swamp Run
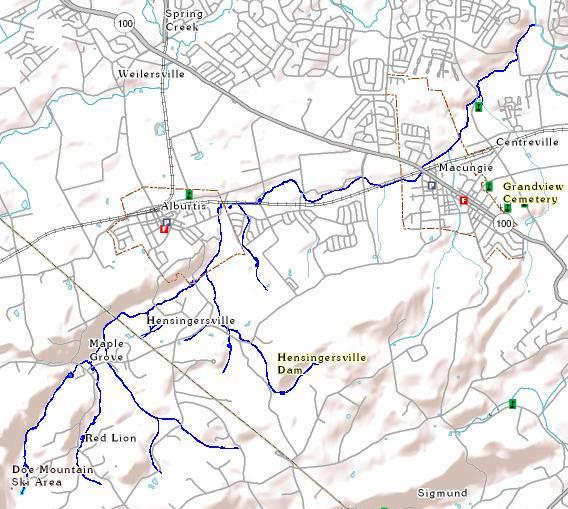
- Course of Swabia Creek in eastern Pennsylvania
- Etymology: "Swabia" derives from the birthplace of many of the area's early settlers. "Swope" is an anglicization of "Schwab" (a person from Swabia).

Location
- Country: United States
- State: Pennsylvania
- County: Lehigh, Berks

Physical characteristics
- Source: Primary (west) branch
  - location: Rittenhouse Gap
  - coordinates: 40.4739852°N 75.6268548°W
- 2nd source: East branch
  - location: Hensingersville Dam
  - coordinates: 40.487766°N 75.582127°W
  - elevation: 843 ft (257 m)
- 3rd source: Headwater of Mountain Creek
  - location: Upper Milford Township, Pennsylvania
  - coordinates: 40.4942°N 75.5628°W
- Source confluence: West and east branches
  - location: Hensingersville, Pennsylvania
  - coordinates: 40.5038°N 75.5953°W
  - elevation: 433 ft (132 m)
- Mouth: Little Lehigh Creek
  - location: Macungie, Pennsylvania
  - coordinates: 40.53584°N 75.53867°W
  - elevation: 351 ft (107 m)
- Basin size: 12.37 mi^{2} (32.0 km^{2})
- Discharge
  - location: Macungie, Pennsylvania

Basin features
- River system: Little Lehigh Creek
- Tributaries
  - right: Mountain Creek, Indian Creek

Swabia Creek is a tributary of Little Lehigh Creek in Berks and Lehigh Counties in the eastern Pennsylvania region of the Lehigh Valley.

== Sources ==
The primary (west) branch of Swabia Creek begins in the Bear Creek Mountain Resort, near Rittenhouse Gap in Longswamp Township, Berks County. Two other tributary streams, unnamed, also begin in Berks County. The east branch begins with numerous seeps and rivulets feeding into Hensingersville Dam in Lower Macungie Township. Two tributaries, Mountain Creek and an unnamed stream, begin in Upper Milford Township. All streams begin on the South Mountain ridge, although surface and ground waters enter from Lock Ridge.

== Course ==
=== Swabian valleys ===
A tributary of the west branch flows past the village of Red Lion and joins the primary branch and another tributary in the village of Maple Grove. The west branch of Swabia Creek then runs along the Lock Ridge south face. The east branch passes through Hensingersville Dam. The east and west branches connect in Hensingersville. Swabia creek then runs north to Alburtis through Lock Ridge Park. The creek turns east, running roughly parallel to railroad tracks.

=== Upper alluvial plain ===
Three intermittent runs feed Swabia Creek in the upper alluvial plain between Alburtis and Macungie. Each starts on South Mountain, flows north, and, after crossing Mountain Road, roughly parallels an historic road. The western two pass through The Hills at Lock Ridge, also known as The Reserves at Annandale development. The Schoeneck Road run provides the back boundary line for houses located on Seip Road and Knerr Drive. The Orchard Road run was relocated and channelized immediately west of Orchard Road. The Gehman Road run passes the Allen Organ headquarters and Mack Trucks assembly plant. After Gehman Road, Swabia Creek enters Macungie. In Macungie, Swabia Creek is joined by Mountain Creek.

=== Mountain Creek ===
Mountain Creek starts in Upper Milford Township, behind a South Mountain promontory known locally as Macungie Mountain. The creek flows past Reimert Memorial Bird Haven and then various springs in the Macungie watershed before entering Macungie at Kalmbach Park. Mountain Creek flows along the west side of Memorial Park before joining Swabia Creek.

=== Lower alluvial plain ===
After receiving Mountain Creek, Swabia Creek turns northeast. Indian Creek, a final intermittent brook, joins Swabia Creek just downstream of Brookside Country Club after meandering past a large group of petroleum tank farms and is fed, in part, from Brinker Pond. After receiving Indian Creek, Swabia Creek joins Little Lehigh Creek. The majority of Swabia Creek's route is in Lower Macungie Township in Lehigh County and other sources beginning in Berks County and Upper Milford Township in Lehigh County.

== Watershed ==
Swabia Creek has a drainage area of 12.37 square miles. Swabia Creek is in the Pennsylvania State Water Plan watershed #2C-Lehigh River.

The Swabia Creek watershed includes Mountain Creek. Mountain Creek joins Swabia Creek in Macungie. Mountain Creek and adjacent springs have historically provided water to Macungie.

== Natural environment ==
=== Surface geology ===
South Mountain and Lock Ridge expose the region's pre-Cambrian, metamorphic basement rock, primarily granitic Byram gneiss with some hornblendic gneiss. Immediately above the village of Maple Grove and similarly along the north face of South Mountain, the descending Swabia Creek branches and tributaries encounter a band of quartzite, variously referred to as Hardyston quartzite and Potsdam sandstone. Skolithos fossils can be found embedded in this quartzite along Lock Ridge. After Maple Grove, the west branch flows along a depression created by a fault where the ancient crystalline gneiss of Lock Ridge erupts through the Leithsville formation. The Leithsville formation is composed of dolomite with shale and chert and is sometimes referred to as Tomstown dolomite. The same progression in surface geology (gneiss, quartzite, dolomite) occurs for the east branch and Mountain Creek. Swabia Creek mostly passes through Leithsville formation from Lock Ridge through Alburtis to Macungie. In the lower alluvial plain after Macungie, the Leithsville formation submerges under the Allentown formation, which contains limestone mixed with dolomite. The Leithsville, Allentown, and nearby Epler formations are all part of the Kittatinny supergroup.

Many limonite mines were located in the upper and lower Swabian valleys and the upper alluvial plain. Many of these mines were operated by the Thomas Iron Company. Several magnetite and hematite mines were situated near the upper portion of the east branch. The iron ore was located near the surface in shale present in interfaces between the various formations. Limestone quarries are found in the lower alluvial plain. Gneiss quarries are found on Lock Ridge and near Hensingersville. A site where Indians quarried jasper is found near the upper portion of Mountain Creek. Soils in the alluvial plain from Alburtis to Little Lehigh Creek are silt loams, such as Lindside and Melvin series.

=== Flora ===
Many freshwater forested wetlands, emergent wetlands, and ponds found along Swabia Creek are listed in the National Wetlands Inventory. The wetlands are listed as temporarily flooded palustrine systems containing broad-leaved deciduous forest, shrubland, or reeds. The Macungie watershed, through which Mountain Creek flows, contains Northern Appalachian circumneutral seeps natural community which can support diverse threatened or endangered plants. South Mountain is generally dominated by tulip tree, sweet birch, red oak, and silky dogwood. Common undergrowth includes jewelweed, bulrush, poison ivy, Virginia creeper, and fox grape. Native plants growing in the alluvial plain include vervain, jewelweed, boneset, lobelia (including cardinal flower), sedges, aster, Joe-Pye weed, dwarf bluestar, black eyed susan, golden ragwort, goldenrod, red swamp mallow, redtwig dogwood and river birch, and dogwood. Common introduced plants in the alluvial plain include oxeye daisy. Invasive plants in the alluvial plain, removed during restoration, include Japanese knotweed, Japanese hops, purple loosestrife, and reed canary grass.

=== Fauna ===
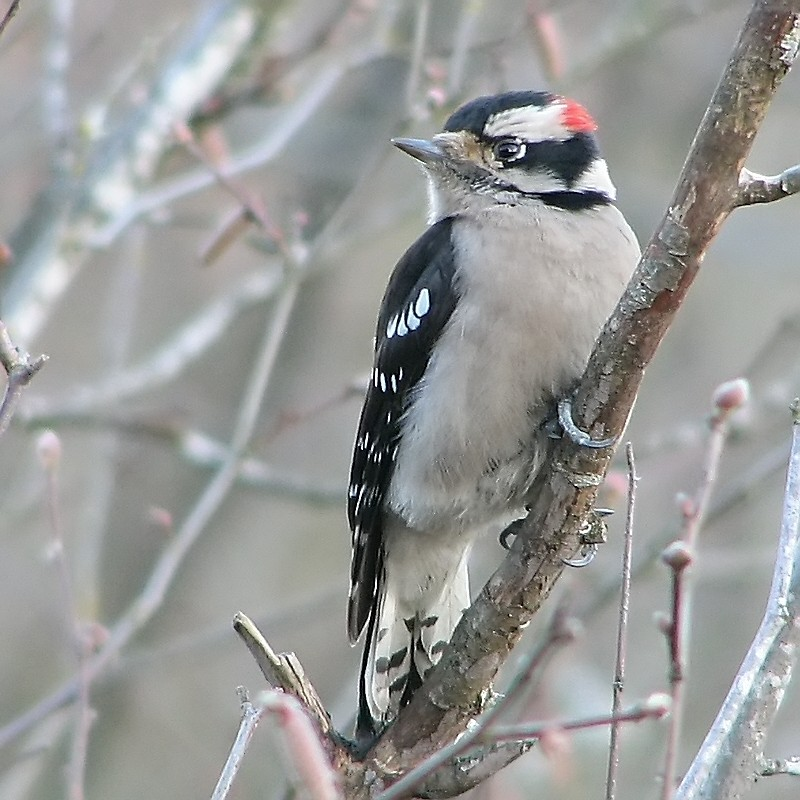
A Downy woodpecker in Swabia Creek in January 2007

Swabia Creek contains brown trout, rainbow trout, catfish and sunfish. Swabia Creek and Mountain Creek are classified as High Quality Cold Water Fisheries.

Permanent avian residents of Reimert Memorial Bird Haven, near the Mountain Creek headwater, include red-bellied, downy, and hairy woodpeckers, and white-breasted nuthatches, black-capped chickadees, tufted titmice (commonly called "warblers"), northern cardinals, blue jays, and non-native house finches. Common migrant birds include dark-eyed juncos, American robins, song sparrows, mourning doves, American goldfinches, purple finches, northern flickers, and hermit thrushes.

=== Conservation ===
In August 2005, the Pennsylvania Department of Environmental Protection performed a geomorphic assessment and found that agricultural sedimentation and urban runoff were impairing water quality, degrading aquatic habitat, destabilizing the channel and banks, and causing other negative impacts. The department placed Swabia Creek on its Integrated List of impaired waterways. The assessment recommended implementing specific best management practices, including establishing native vegetation and use of natural stream channel design, to improve habitat quality and floodplain function. The department granted funds to The Wildlands Conservancy to improve stream and wetlands conditions.

The upper Swabian valleys are located in the Pennsylvania Highlands as defined by the federal Highlands Conservation Act of 2004. This designation may result in development of a conservation greenway that includes large portions of the Swabia Creek watershed. The Macungie Watershed, which is drained by Mountain Creek, is listed as an "Area of Statewide Significance" (and by The Nature Conservancy as a priority level 1) and the surrounding areas along South Mountain are listed as "Very High Conservation Priority".

The boroughs of Macungie and Alburtis and Lower Macungie Township have developed plans for a 3-mile greenway and trail extending from Alburtis to Macungie, parallel to Swabia Creek but south of the Norfolk Southern tracks. A proposed spur would extend from Macungie along Mountain Creek to the Pennsylvania Highlands Greenway atop South Mountain.

== Human history ==
When Europeans arrived, the inhabitants were most likely Lenape. As the name of the creek suggests, many early European settlers in the vicinity were from Swabia (German: Schwaben). The abundance of iron ore attracted early surface miners, then larger furnace owners and finally the Catasauqua and Fogelsville Railroad was constructed primarily to transport ore from the Swabian valley to the furnaces. A well-regarded inn in Maple Grove operates in a building existing since around 1783.

A similarly named, but otherwise unrelated, Schwaben Creek runs through and gives its name to part of Washington and Upper Mahanoy townships, Northumberland County, Pennsylvania, about 75 miles west of Swabia Creek. This Schwaben Creek (or possibly a similarly named creek in Pine Grove Township, Schuylkill County) appears to be that forming the north boundary of the Mahantongo region.

== Etymology ==
Swabia Creek is also commonly referred to as Swope Creek. The U.S. Geological Survey's Board on Geographic Names decided that the official reference is "Swabia Creek", while recognizing "Swabian Creek", "Swamp Run" and "Swope Creek" as variant names. The names "Swabia Creek" and "Swope Creek" both derive from the fact that many early settlers in the area are from the Swabia region of Germany. "Swope" and "Swabian" are synonyms. In Bavaria, Swope (or "Swab") means a person who lives or lived in Swabia. Swope derives from the Germanic spelling, Schwaben, and ultimately the Latin name for the German tribe, Suebi.

== See also ==
- List of rivers of Pennsylvania
