= Ironton Railroad =

Railway line in Lehigh County, Pennsylvania

- Map showing the Ironton Railroad, its connections, and mineral resources along the route in the Lehigh Valley

Overview
- Headquarters: Easton, Pennsylvania, U.S.
- Locale: Lehigh County, Pennsylvania, U.S.
- Dates of operation: 1860–1976
- Successor: Conrail

Technical
- Track gauge: 4 ft 8 1/2 in (1,435 mm) standard gauge

The Ironton Railroad was a shortline railroad in Lehigh County, Pennsylvania. Originally built in 1861 to haul iron ore and limestone to blast furnaces along the Lehigh River, traffic later shifted to carrying Portland cement when local iron mining declined in the early 20th century. Much of the railroad had already been abandoned when it became part of Conrail in 1976, and the last of its trackage was removed in 1984.

== History ==
The railroad was originally incorporated on March 4, 1859, to run from Balliettsville to a connection with the Lehigh Valley Railroad or the Catasauqua and Fogelsville Railroad. The charter also allowed the railroad to own land along the right-of-way containing iron ore or limestone. Its charter was amended on May 16, 1861, to change the terminus from Balliettsville to Ironton, and was also given the power to buy connecting branch railroads and lay its own branches of up to 6 miles (9.7 km) to iron ore mines.

The principal reason for building the railroad was to haul iron ore from the mines at Ironton to iron furnaces along the Lehigh River. The rapid growth of the Lehigh Valley iron industry during the 1850s had resulted in a mining boom, but the heavy ore traffic was highly destructive to local roads. The Catasauqua and Fogelsville Railroad had already been built further to the south in the late 1850s to bring ore to furnaces of the Thomas Iron Company and the Lehigh Crane Iron Company. Shortly after its incorporation, the railroad made a contract with Tinsley Jeter, who owned one of the large mines at Ironton, to construct the railroad. For a fixed payment, he agreed to build the railroad, which also purchased his iron mines. The railroad was leased to Jeter for three years from January 1, 1860.

The railroad was surveyed by George B. Roberts, later president of the Pennsylvania Railroad. Grading began at Ironton on 2 August 1859, and rails were laid by the end of January 1860. The ballasting of the railroad could not be finished until spring, and the first train ran on 24 May 1860. Regular service began in July or August. At the beginning of 1861, Roberts was elected one of the directors; Jay Cooke and his partner EW Clark, who financed the railroad, were also directors.

The line, as initially built, ran from the mines at Ironton down a small tributary to reach Coplay Creek, and then followed the creek to the vicinity of Egypt. Here the creek turns south, and the railroad continued east over a small ridge to meet the Lehigh Valley Railroad on the banks of the Lehigh River, on the north side of Coplay. Limonite ore from the mines along the railroad was shipped to iron companies along the Lehigh River via the Lehigh Valley Railroad. The closest was the Lehigh Valley Iron Company, just south of the interchange in Coplay; Thomas Iron, in Hokendauqua, and Crane Iron in Catasauqua were further downriver. The railroad also shipped limestone for the furnaces from quarries along the line (one of which it owned), and coal, probably to fuel the stationary steam engines at the mines.

During the summer of 1861, the railroad obtained permission under its amended charter to extend a branch to Siegersville and Orefield. Lying to the southwest of Ironton, these two towns were also the site of extensive ore mining. The right-of-way left the main line near Ormrod, and followed Coplay Creek to around Meyersville Road, then cut cross-country to Siegersville, turning south and descending the hill to Orefield.

The Siegersville Branch was completed to Siegersville by 1862, and reached Orefield soon thereafter. The company also bought out Jeter's lease and began independent operation on January 1, 1862. By the beginning of 1863, Cooke had been replaced on the board by his brother-in-law, William G. Moorhead, and Jeter had become a director.

Another charter amendment on January 30, 1866, allowed the railroad to lease ore lands along the right-of-way as well. On February 1, 1882, all of the Ironton's stock was bought by the Thomas Iron Company, which owned several mines along the right-of-way.

== Shift to cement ==
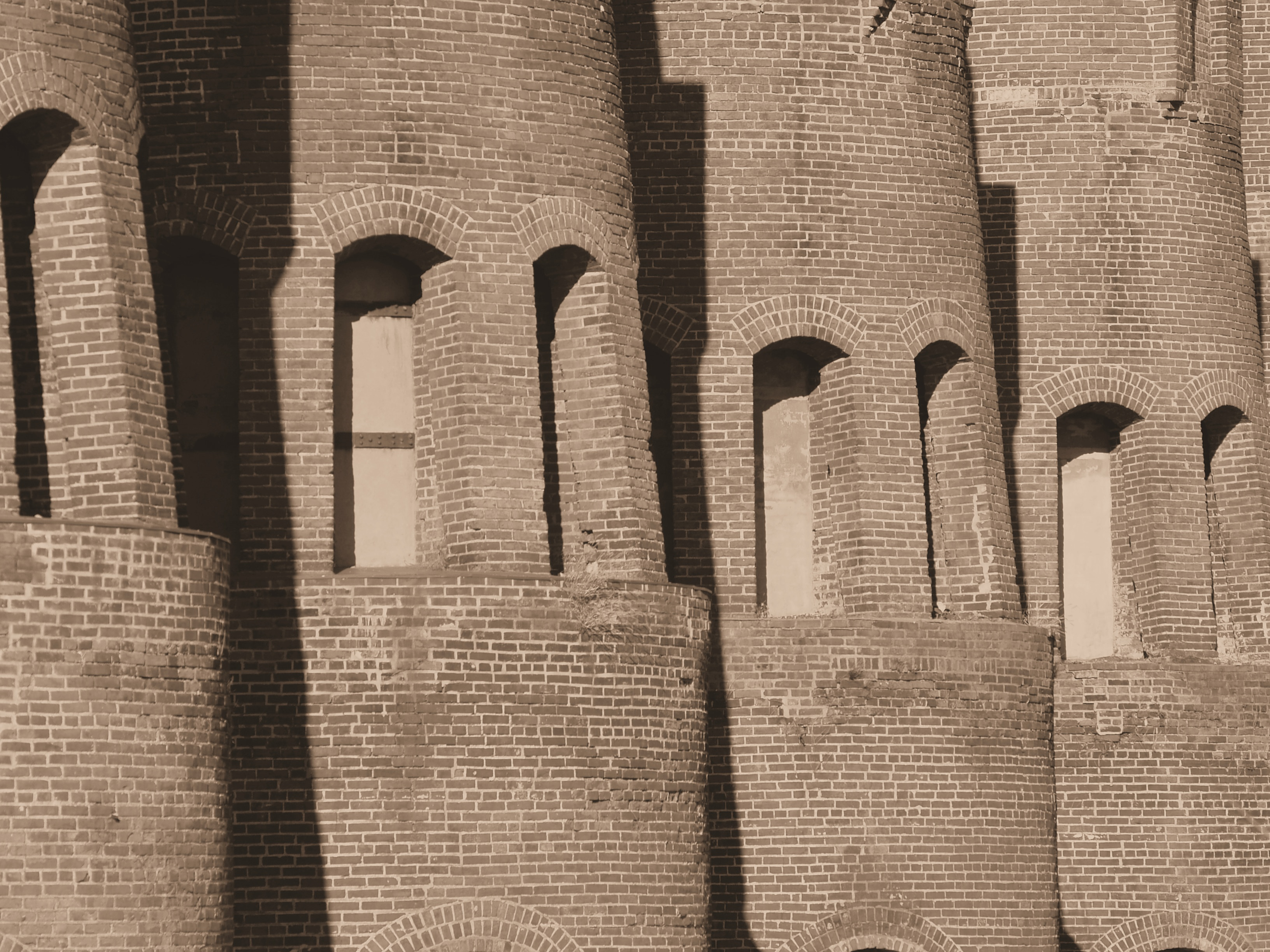
Cement kilns along the right-of-way at Coplay in Lehigh County, Pennsylvania

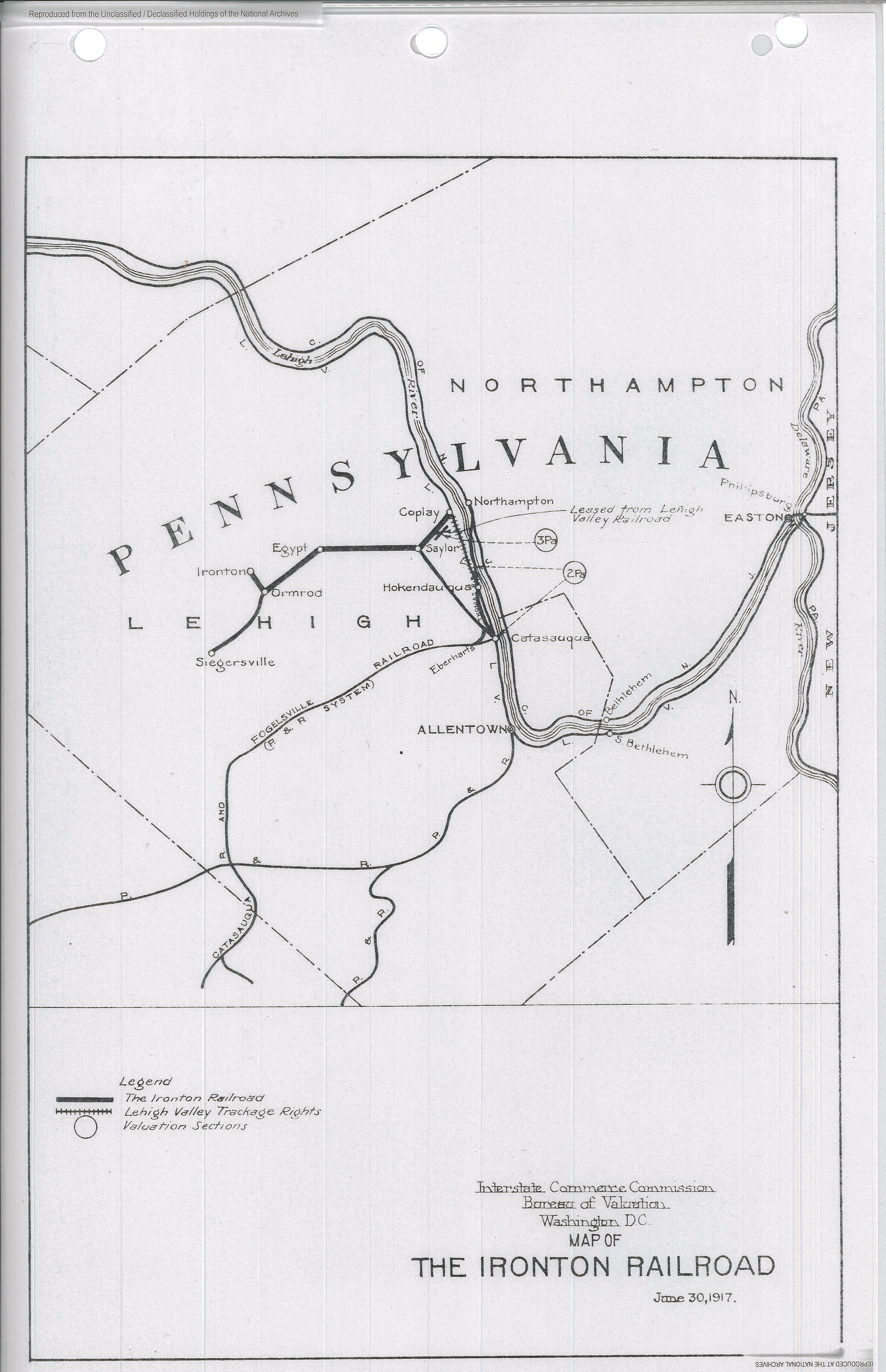
1917 system map of the railroad

In 1884, shortly after its purchase by Thomas Iron, the first shipment of Portland cement was made over the railroad. Extensive cement deposits lie in the vicinity of the line, and cement became an increasing part of the railroad's traffic. This proved to be its saving grace as the local iron mining industry began to decline. The Siegersville Branch was cut back from Orefield to Siegersville sometime between 1876 and 1900. However, passenger service began on the railroad on November 1, 1898.

In 1902, the Ironton leased all of the trackage owned by Thomas Iron, including its line from Hokendauqua to West Catasauqua, and performed its plant switching. On December 21, 1906, Thomas Iron incorporated all of the trackage it owned, except for that immediately around the plant, as the Thomas Railroad. This was leased to the Ironton in 1907, and that year, a new branch was built off the Ironton near Egypt along Coplay Creek to reach the Thomas Railroad at West Catasauqua. The Ironton also built a large yard along the creek in West Catasauqua and a new interchange with the Catasquaua and Fogelsville, by that time controlled and operated by the Reading Company.

In the early 20th century, the Ironton began to seek more diverse sources of revenue. Potato farmers became significant shippers on the Siegersville Branch, which also saw deer and buffalo being moved by rail to the Trexler Game Preserve in 1911. However, the Ironton's parent company could not escape the ongoing trends in iron manufacture. As Mesabi Range iron ores, hauled by rail, became increasingly favored for ironmaking, not only the local mines but the whole Lehigh Valley iron industry began to struggle. By 1914, the Ironton was the only profitable subsidiary of Thomas Iron. The Thomas Railroad was merged into the Ironton on December 4, 1917. After Thomas Iron collapsed in 1921, its stock was sold to Drexel & Company, which sold off Thomas Iron's railroad holdings. The Ironton became the joint property of the Reading and Lehigh Valley Railroads in November 1923.

== Contraction and decline ==
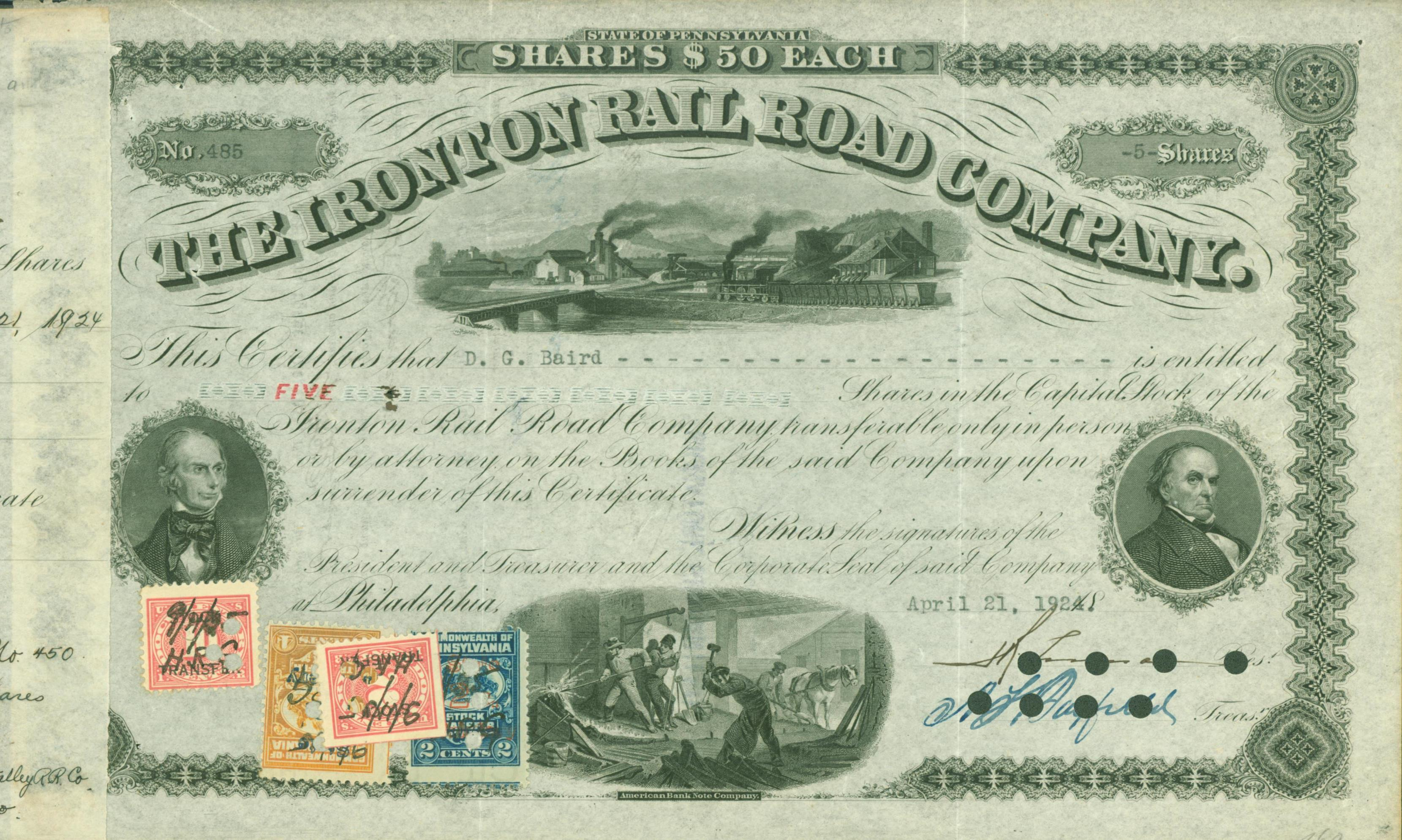
Share of the Ironton Rail Road Company, issued 21 April 1924

The Ironton switched from steam to diesel power between October 1948 and 1949. In late 1955, the Siegersville Branch was abandoned, due to increasing truck competition, minimal on-line industry, and the construction of the Northeast Extension across its right-of-way. In 1961, it was cut back about 1 mile (1.6 km) from Ironton to a farmers' co-operative. A further abandonment, from the co-op to Ormrod, took place in the late 1970s or early 1980s. In 1976, the Ironton followed the Lehigh Valley and the Reading to become a part of Conrail, but in 1984, the last remaining trackage was abandoned.

In 1996, Whitehall Township purchased 9.2 miles (14.8 km) of the right-of-way from Conrail, transforming it into the Ironton Rail-trail.

== Stations ==
The following stations existed along the railroad:

Name	Distance	Notes
Main Line
Coplay	0.00 miles (0 km)	Connection with Lehigh Valley Railroad
Saylor	0.73 miles (1.17 km)	
Egypt	1.77 miles (2.85 km)	Connection with Catasauqua Branch
Kohlers	2.14 miles (3.44 km)	
Steckels	2.62 miles (4.22 km)	
Lesley	2.88 miles (4.63 km)	
Ormrod	3.63 miles (5.84 km)	Connection with Siegersville Branch
Ironton	5.52 miles (8.88 km)	
Siegersville Branch
Ormrod	0.00 miles (0 km)	Connection with main line
Ballietsville	1.75 miles (2.82 km)	
Siegersville	2.00 miles (3.22 km)	
Catasauqua Branch and Thomas Railroad
Egypt	0.00 miles (0 km)	Connection with main line
West Coplay	0.75 miles (1.21 km)	
West Catasauqua	2.55 miles (4.10 km)	Connection with Catasauqua & Fogelsville Railroad, Thomas Railroad, Lehigh Valley Railroad
Hokendauqua	3.22 miles (5.18 km)	Site of Thomas Iron Company furnaces and post-1907 engine facilities; connection with Central Railroad of New Jersey
Lower Coplay	3.90 miles (6.28 km)	Connection with Lehigh Valley Railroad

The Ironton also had trackage rights over the Lehigh Valley from Coplay to Lower Coplay, 0.24 miles (0.39 km).
