= Hensingersville, Pennsylvania =

Unincorporated community in Pennsylvania, U.S.

Coordinates: 40°29′45″N 75°35′25″W

Hensingersville, also known as New Hensingersville, is an unincorporated community located mostly in southwestern Lower Macungie Township in Lehigh County, Pennsylvania. It also extends into Longswamp Township in Berks Township near the intersections of Pennsylvania Route 201, Pennsylvania Route 3001 (Hensingersville Road) and Mountain Road. The community is located just south of the Alburtis and Lock Ridge Park at the confluence of the west and east branches of Swabia Creek. It is part of the Lehigh Valley, which has a population of 861,899 and was the 68th-most populous metropolitan area in the U.S. as of the 2020 census.

== History ==
=== 19th century ===
In 1846, a hotel was built by Peter Hensinger and local residents named the area Hensingersville. A post office was opened in Hensingersville 12 years later, in 1858. That same year, the Philadelphia and Reading Railway established a train stop several miles north in present-day Alburtis, and the post office was transferred to Alburtis. A ghost named Bucky is alleged to haunt the Old Hensingersville Hotel. Hensingersville Dam is located south of Hensingersville, off Reservoir Hill Road.

=== 20th century ===
In 1936, Hensingersville Dam was built on the east branch of Swabia Creek in the Lehigh River watershed. The dam is owned by the Alburtis Borough Authority and used for recreation purposes. The dam is earth and concrete, 18-feet high and 135-feet long. Its capacity is 51 acre-feet (63,000 m^{3}). Normal storage is 3 acre-feet (3,700 m^{3}) with a surface area of 1 acre (4,000 m^{2}). It drains an area of 0.4 square miles (1,000,000 m^{2}). The dam's latitude and longitude are 40.4877, -75.5823.

== Geography ==
The community's elevation is 489 feet. Hensingersville appears on the East Greenville USGS survey as a populated place. It is split between the Alburtis ZIP Code of 18011 and the Macungie Zip Code of 18062.

== Education ==
Hensingersville is served by East Penn School District. Emmaus High School in Emmaus serves grades nine through twelve. Eyer Middle School and Lower Macungie Middle School, both in Macungie, serve grades six through eight.
