= Ironton Rail Trail =

Rail trail in Pennsylvania, US

Coordinates: 40.66475°N 75.51014°W

- Length: 9.2 miles (14.8 km)
- Location: Lehigh County, Pennsylvania
- Trailheads: North Whitehall Township, Pennsylvania; Coplay, Pennsylvania
- Use: Hiking, Cycling
- Surface: Asphalt

The Ironton Rail Trail is a rail trail that spans 9 mi (14 km) in Lehigh County, Pennsylvania. The trail was made from tracks of the defunct Ironton Railroad and includes a paved 5 mi (8.0 km) loop.

The trail spreads across Whitehall Township, Coplay and North Whitehall. It is a very popular trail in the Lehigh Valley for walkers, bikers, runners and dog walkers. The trail has many events such as a 10k race held every year.

== History ==
The Ironton Railroad was originally chartered in 1859 and built during the 1860s. It transported iron ore from mines in Ironton, Pennsylvania to the Thomas Iron Company plant in Hokendauqua, Pennsylvania. The railroad was acquired by the Reading Company in 1923 and was consolidated into Conrail in 1976. However, the railroad was ultimately closed in 1984, and tracks were removed in 1990.

Right of way for the 9.2 miles (14.8 km) stretch that would become the Ironton Rail Trail was purchased from Conrail in 1996.
