= Lock Ridge Park =

Park in Pennsylvania, United States

Coordinates: 40.508480°N 75.593879°W

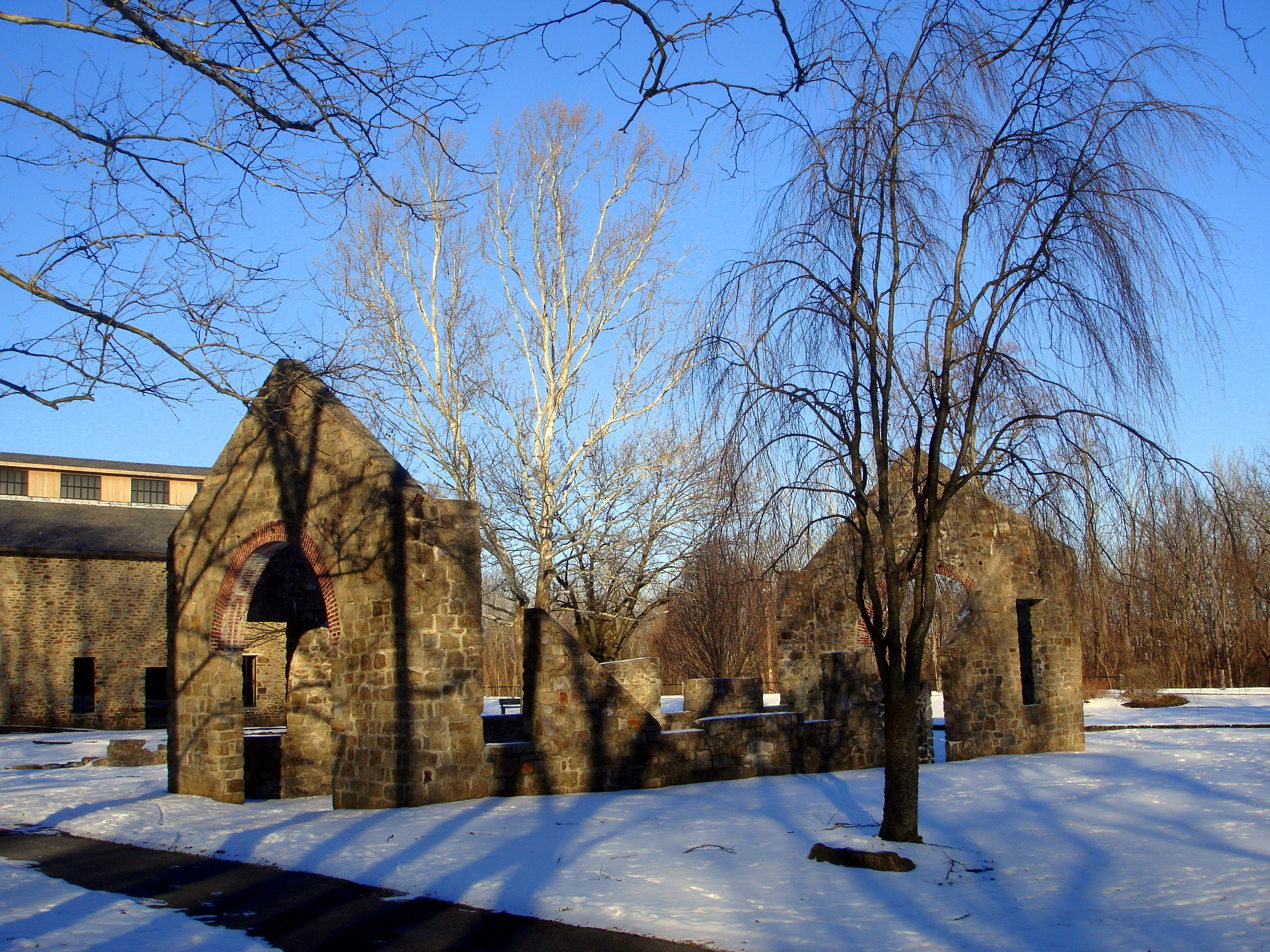
Since abandoned buildings at Lock Ridge Park in Alburtis, Pennsylvania, in January 2010

Lock Ridge Park is a park built around a historic iron ore blast furnace just outside Alburtis, Pennsylvania in the Lehigh Valley region of eastern Pennsylvania.

== History ==
=== 19th century ===
The park preserves portions of the former Lock Ridge Iron Works. The first furnace at the site was built in 1868 by the Lock Ridge Iron Company, on the line of the Catasauqua and Fogelsville Railroad near its junction with the East Pennsylvania Railroad. The company was taken over the next year by the Thomas Iron Company, and a second furnace put in blast shortly thereafter. The iron industry in the Lehigh Valley was then flourishing, and the Lock Ridge furnaces, designated No. 7 and No. 8 by Thomas Iron, were typical of the time. Rather than common charcoal, they used a hot blast to burn anthracite fuel, a technology brought to the United States by the company's founder, David Thomas, in 1839

=== 20th century ===
By the early 20th century, however, the furnaces were, despite sporadic improvements, technologically out-of-date, and were reputedly the last anthracite iron furnaces operating in the United States. B. F. Fackenthal, president of Thomas Iron, recommended they be decommissioned upon his resignation in 1913.

Fackenthal's successor, Ralph Sweetser, pursued the opposite course. No. 8 furnace stack was rebuilt in 1914, and No. 7 the following year. Concurrently, anthracite was replaced by coke as a fuel for the furnaces. However, modernization was not enough to save the Lock Ridge furnaces, and iron was last made there in 1921.

The furnaces were sold to William Butz, who dismantled most of the buildings for scrap iron and lumber. The masonry structures, however, were allowed to remain, but in a decayed condition. The slag dumps on the property were crushed, screened, and used for roofing and fill by the Lehigh Slag Company until 1958. Little-used since the closing of the furnaces, the Catasauqua and Fogelsville's rail lines through the site was torn up in the 1940s. With industrial operations on the property long complete, it was donated by the Butz family to Lehigh County for use as a park.

In August 1976, Lock Ridge Park was opened as a 59.2 acres (24.0 ha) public park. It is operated as a partnership between Lehigh County, which owns and maintains the site, and the Lehigh County Historical Society, which provides public tours of the furnace complex. The park is made up of the remains of the old furnace complex, now the Lock Ridge Furnace Museum, and the land surrounding it.

Swabia Creek, which flows through the park grounds, offers limited fishing. The park also features a Little League Baseball field and a picnic pavilion with restrooms and a fireplace. The park also features a self-guided walking tour of the site.

== Notes ==
- Bartholomew, Craig L.; Metz, Lance E. (1988). Bartholomew, Ann (ed.). The Anthracite Iron Industry of the Lehigh Valley. Center for Canal History and Technology. ISBN 0-930973-08-9.
- "Lock Ridge Park and Furnace Museum".
