= Rittenhouse Gap, Pennsylvania =

Village in Pennsylvania, U.S.

Rittenhouse Gap is a human settlement in Longswamp Township in Berks County, Pennsylvania, United States, situated at 40°28′04″N 75°37′47″W.

The gap which gives the town its name lies between the headwaters of Swabia Creek, in the Lehigh River watershed, and an unnamed tributary of the Perkiomen Creek, in the Schuylkill River watershed. Gap Hill lies along its northwestern side.

The village is located at the northeastern end of the gap, around the source of Swabia Creek. The Catasauqua and Fogelsville Railroad was extended to the village in 1865, to carry magnetite from the mines in the vicinity, largely owned by the Thomas Iron Company. These mines were among those selected by Thomas Edison for experiments in magnetic beneficiation of iron ore, by which he hoped to make iron mining in the Northeastern United States cost effective. The availability of cheap Mesabi Range ore defeated his plans, and the mines and railroad were abandoned after World War I. The geological origins of the deposits have been the subject of recent research.

With the closing of the iron mines, the community lost its principal support. It now lies at the head of the Bear Creek Mountain Resort and uses the Macungie zip code of 18062.
