= Pennsylvania Highlands =

Pennsylvania Highlands may refer to the following in the United States:

- Pennsylvania Highlands Region, a section of the Appalachian Mountains in Eastern Pennsylvania
- Pennsylvania Highlands Community College, in Johnstown, Pennsylvania, with several satellite sites
