= George F. Schlicher Hotel =

- U.S. National Register of Historic Places
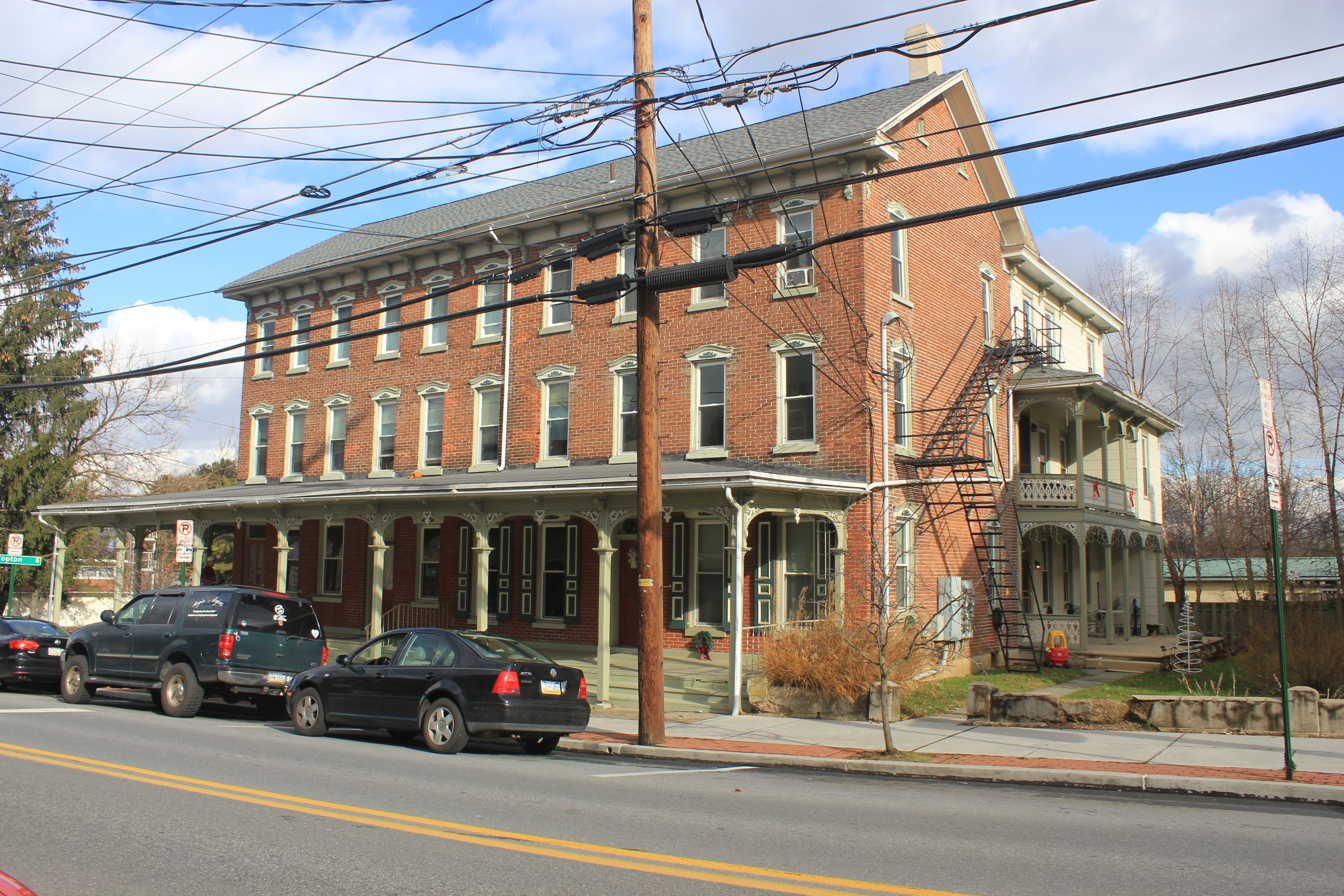
- George F. Schlicher Hotel, December 2012

- Location within Pennsylvania Location within the United States
- Location: 105-107 S. Main St., Alburtis, Pennsylvania
- Coordinates: 40°30′43″N 75°36′12″W
- Area: 0.5 acres (0.20 ha)
- Built: 1877
- Built by: Schlicher, George F.
- Architectural style: Late Victorian
- NRHP reference No.: 92000396
- Added to NRHP: May 7, 1992

The George F. Schlicher Hotel is an historic hotel which is located in Alburtis, Pennsylvania in the Lehigh Valley metropolitan area of eastern Pennsylvania.

It was added to the National Register of Historic Places in 1992.

== History and architectural features ==
Built in 1877, the George F. Schlicher Hotel is a three-and-one-half-story brick building, which was designed in a Victorian architectural style. It features elaborate porchway arches and gingerbread woodwork. A frame addition was built during the early 1900s. The building was converted to apartments in 1944.
