= Gibby Hatton =

American cyclist and trainer

Personal information
- Full name: Gilbert Hatton
- Born: July 31, 1956 (age 70) Alburtis, Pennsylvania, U.S.

Cycling career
- Sport: Cycling
- Discipline: Track
- Role: Rider
- Rider type: Sprinter
Medal record
Men's track cycling
Representing United States
World Championships
Bronze medal – third place	1983 Zürich	Keirin

Gilbert "Gil" Hatton (born July 31, 1956], also known as Gibby Hatton, is an American former track cyclist and current cycling trainer.

== Early life ==
Hatton was born on July 31, 1956, in Alburtis, Pennsylvania.

== Cycling career ==
In 1976 and 1977, Hatton was American vice champion in sprint. He finished as third in the Keirin at the 1983 UCI Track World Championships in Zürich and was the first American to be invited to the International Keirin Series in Japan, racing there from 1984 until 1991.

After the end of his career in 1992, Hatton continued racing in the masters class. Hatton has also worked as cycling coach. He has supervised Marty Nothstein, a multiple world champion, American cyclists Jessica Grieco, Rebecca Quinn, and Amber Holt, and the South African driver Jean-Pierre van Zyl. In 2003, Hatton was added into the Hall of Fame of the Valley Preferred Cycling Center in Trexlertown, Pennsylvania.
