= Mary Ann Furnace Historic District =

Historic district in Pennsylvania, United States

- U.S. National Register of Historic Places
- U.S. Historic district
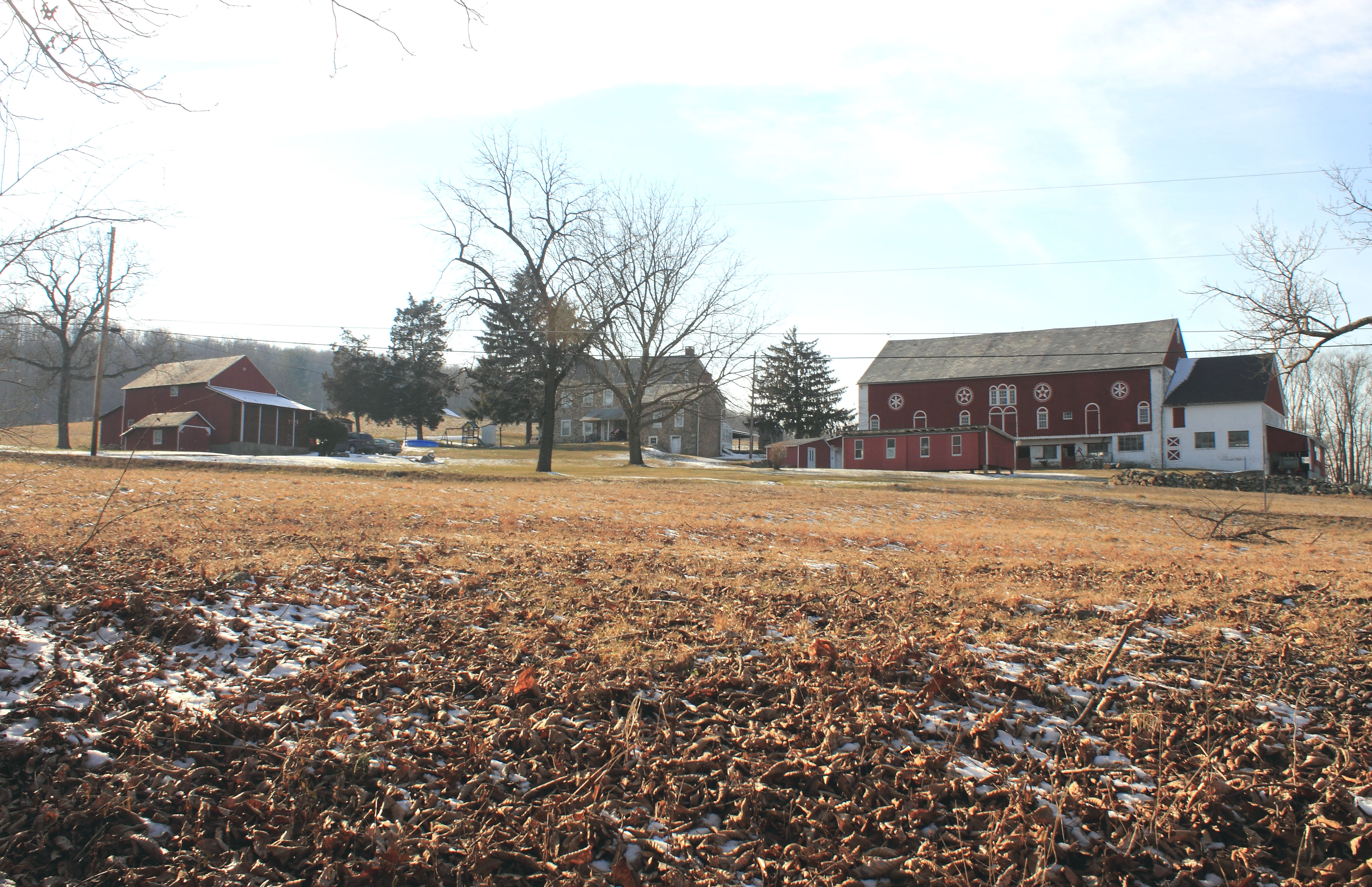
- Mary Ann Furnace Historic District in Longswamp Township, Pennsylvania

- Location within Pennsylvania Location within the United States
- Location: Centennial Road southeast of Longswamp, Longswamp Township, Pennsylvania
- Coordinates: 40°29′5″N 75°38′54″W
- Area: 9 acres (3.6 ha)
- Built: 1789
- Architectural style: Iron furnace
- MPS: Iron and Steel Resources of Pennsylvania MPS
- NRHP reference No.: 91001141
- Added to NRHP: September 6, 1991

The Mary Ann Furnace Historic District, also known as Trexler's Furnace, is an historic iron plantation and national historic district located in Longswamp Township in Berks County, Pennsylvania.

It was listed on the National Register of Historic Places in 1991.

== History and architectural features ==
This district encompasses five contributing buildings, one contributing site, and one contributing structure. They are the iron furnace stack (1789), a stone and frame bank barn (c. 1830-1860), the manager's house and office (c. 1830-1860), a blacksmith shop (1854), a charcoal house (c. 1850), a stone dam, and a small stone house (c. 1830-1850). The furnace remained in operation until 1869.

The historical district is commemorated by a historical marker that was erected in 1924. Today, it is owned by the Rohrbach family, which continues to keep the property as historical accurate as possible.
