= Long-Hawerter Mill =

- U.S. National Register of Historic Places
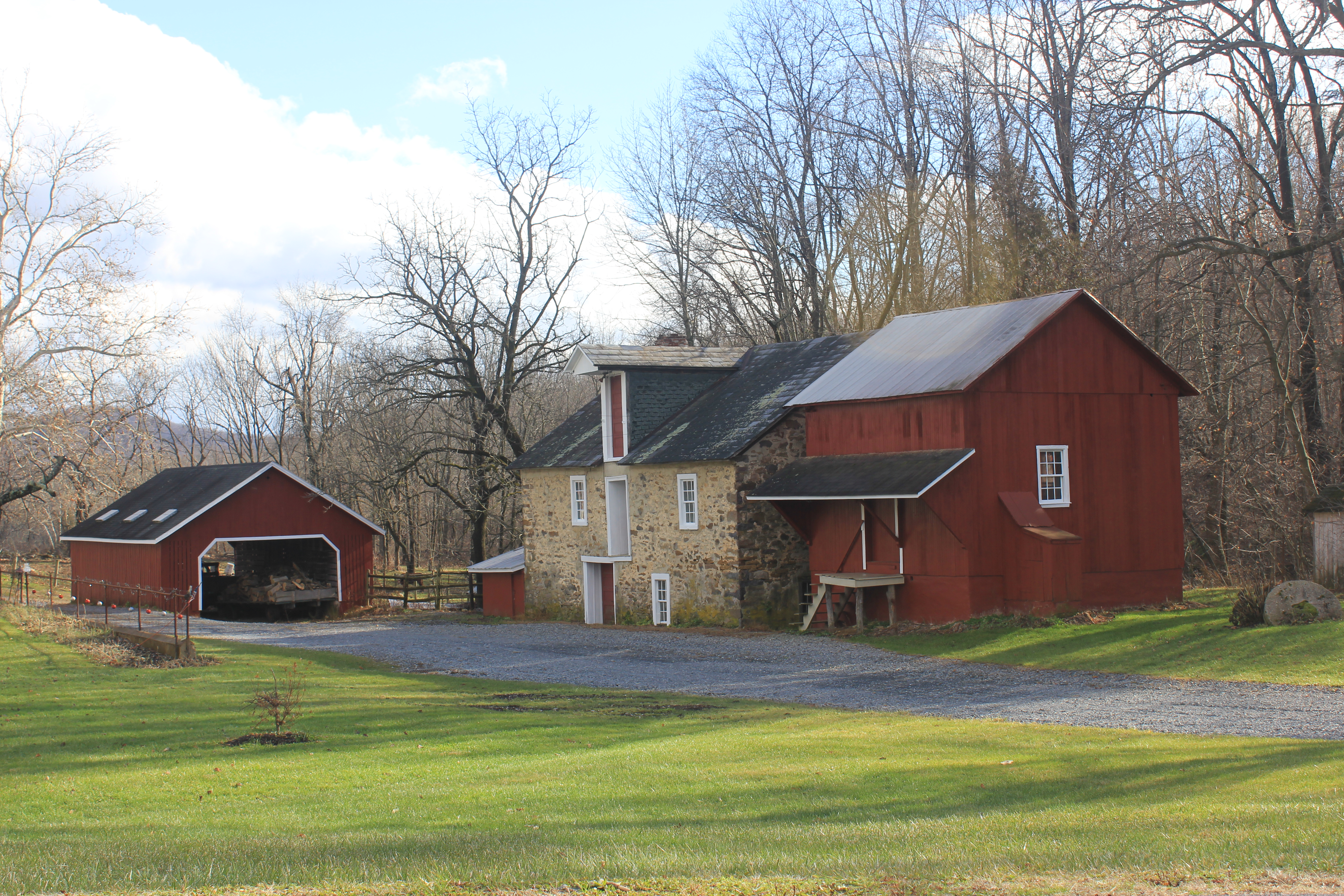
- Long-Hawerter Mill, December 2012

- Location within Pennsylvania Location within the United States
- Location: Longsdale Road at Little Lehigh Creek, Longswamp Township, Pennsylvania
- Coordinates: 40°29′21″N 75°39′50″W
- Area: 2 acres (0.81 ha)
- Built: c. 1800
- MPS: Gristmills in Berks County MPS
- NRHP reference No.: 90001623
- Added to NRHP: November 8, 1990

The Long-Hawerter Mill is an historic grist mill that is located on Little Lehigh Creek in Longswamp Township, Berks County, Pennsylvania, United States.

It was listed on the National Register of Historic Places in 1990.

== History and architectural features ==
The mill was built circa 1800, and is a 1 1/2-story, banked, stone building measuring thirty-six feet, five inches wide by twenty-six feet, one-inch deep, with a slate roof. Attached to it is a one-story, frame cider mill and one-story, frame maple sugar house. Also located on the property are the watercourses, consisting of the headrace, pond, and dam. The mill operated into the 1950s.
