= Catasauqua and Fogelsville Railroad =

Railway line in the United States of America

- Map of Catasauqua and Fogelsville Railroad's lines in eastern Pennsylvania

Overview
- Locale: Lehigh and Berks counties, Pennsylvania, U.S.
- Dates of operation: 1857–1944
- Successor: Reading Company

Technical
- Track gauge: 4 ft 8 1/2 in (1,435 mm) standard gauge

The Catasauqua and Fogelsville Railroad was built in the 1850s to transport iron ore from local mines in Lehigh and later Berks County to furnaces along the Lehigh River in eastern Pennsylvania. Originally owned by two iron companies, the railroad later became part of the Reading Company, and parts of it remain in operation today.

== Origins ==
From its founding in 1839 until the 1890s, the Crane Iron Company obtained much of its ore supply from limonite deposits in southern Lehigh County. The ore had to be hauled over rural roads to reach the company's furnaces at Catasauqua. The wagons used to carry the heavy ore did great damage to the roads, and as the furnaces expanded, the deficiencies of this method of transportation became clear.

The initial application to the Pennsylvania General Assembly for a railroad charter, around 1853, was met with fierce resistance by local farmers, who feared that trains would frighten livestock, set fires, and destroy the local farming districts. The iron company was forced to compromise and charter the Catasauqua and Fogelsville Plank Road on July 2, 1853. While plank roads were a popular improvement in transportation at the time, the short stretch that was constructed was found wholly inadequate for the haulage of ore. The heavily-loaded wagons rapidly damaged the road and rendered it dangerous for travel. The Crane Iron Company persevered, and on April 20, 1854, the plank road was issued a modified charter to operate as the Catasauqua and Fogelsville Railroad. The newly chartered Thomas Iron Company partnered with Crane Iron in support of the railroad in March 1856, and construction began shortly thereafter. Crane Iron owned 60% of the railroad stock, and Thomas Iron 40%.

== Independent operation ==
The first section of the railroad opened on July 14, 1857. The eastern terminus of the line was in West Catasauqua, where it connected with the private railroad of the Thomas Iron Company, which ran a short distance north to its furnaces at Hokendauqua, and that of Crane Iron, which crossed the Lehigh River to that company's furnaces at Catasauqua. It also connected with the Lehigh Valley Railroad, newly completed through the area. It ran westward through Whitehall Township, with stations at Mickleys and Seiple. It then turned southwestward to enter South Whitehall Township. The line crossed a high bridge over Jordan Creek to reach Guth's station, where there was a short spur to a local limestone quarry and ore pits. Leaving Guth, the railroad turned west, then south to climb across the shoulder of Huckleberry Ridge and reach Wulbert's station in Walbert, then ran southwestward into Upper Macungie Township. At Chapman, Pennsylvania, named for Charles W. Chapman, superintendent of the railroad, it turned south again to end at Rupp's Station, a short distance southward. Fogelsville was not directly reached by the line, but lay about 1.5 miles (2.4 km) west of Rupp's Station.

The railroad could not run a spur to every mine site, and a number of ore wharves were constructed along the right-of-way. At the wharves, ore could be dumped from wagons into piles, and later transferred to railcars to be shipped to the furnaces. Important mines did, however, warrant the expense of constructing branch lines, authorized by a charter supplement of April 8, 1861. Another charter amendment of May 26, 1863, allowing the railroad to extend to Bath, northeast of Catasauqua and terminus of the Bangor and Portland Railroad, was never utilized.

The desire of the Thomas Iron Company to build a furnace in the southern part of the county resulted in a further extension in 1864. Construction continued southward from Rupp's Station, through Crane station, named for the Crane Iron Company, and Trexlertown. Entering Lower Macungie Township, the Catasauqua and Foglesville made a connection with the East Pennsylvania Railroad, completed in 1859, in Alburtis. It crossed over the East Penn and passed alongside the proposed furnace site, just south of Alburtis at Lock Ridge. In 1865, the line was extended south, across Swabia Creek and into the mountains. Climbing southeast and then running southwest along the side of the ridge, the line entered Longswamp Township, Berks County. It entered Red Lion from the northeast and passed on to Rittenhouse Gap and the Thomas Iron Company's magnetite mines there. A turntable was built at the end of the line. The length of the main line from West Catasauqua to Rittenhouse Gap was 30.774 miles (49.53 km). In 1868, the furnaces at Lock Ridge went into operation, shipping and receiving over both the Catasauqua & Fogelsville and the East Penn.

The first major branch line, the Breinigsville Branch, was 5.56 miles (8.95 km) long, and opened in 1873. It left the main line at Trexlertown, and ran as far as Breinigsville on the unfinished Allentown Railroad right-of-way. There it diverged, and continued to Farmington, the site of a large ore wharf, and ended at the ore pits in the vicinity of Klines Corner.

== Reading subsidiary ==
In 1890, most of the stock of the Catasauqua and Fogelsville was acquired by Reading Company at a time when iron ore from the Mesabi Range was representing a competitive threat to local iron mining operations. Two more branches were subsequently added to the system. In 1890, the railroad purchased 3.44 miles (5.54 km) of railroad built by the Crane Iron Company to become the Crane Branch. The branch originated at Crane Junction on the main line south of Rupp's station, ran west and then turned sharply north to end at the Wallner iron mine near Haafsville. In 1891, the Gehman Branch of 1.57 miles (2.53 km) was built. This diverged as a switchback from the main line between Red Lion and Rittenhouse Gap to serve the hematite mines near Seisholtzville.

The Catasauqua and Fogelsville was leased to the Reading on December 8, 1893. A final branch, the Chapman Branch of 1.48 miles (2.38 km) opened in 1906, running west from the main line at Chapman to serve a plant of the Lehigh Portland Cement Company at Fogelsville.

Between 1916 and 1919, furnace slag was dumped under the Jordan Creek high bridge so that it could be replaced by a fill and culvert. Iron ore traffic continued to decline, and the local mines had all been shut down by the end of World War I. Passenger service, from Alburtis to West Catasauqua, was discontinued on September 29, 1935. The mine branches remained in place, derelict, until the 1940s, when the Breinigsville, Crane, and Gehman Branches and the main line south of Lock Ridge were abandoned.

The Catasauqua and Fogelsville was formally merged into the Reading on August 10, 1944, probably to simplify the corporate structure of that railroad and to save on taxes, as with a series of other mergers the next year.

=== Post-merger ===
The line from Alburtis to the since closed furnaces at Lock Ridge remained in place to haul furnace slag until 1959, when it was abandoned. Otherwise, the line remained largely intact until after being acquired by Conrail. The connection in West Catasauqua with the Lehigh and New England Railroad, formerly the Crane Iron Company tracks, was abandoned in 1961. Anticipating the abandonment of the former Lehigh Valley main line in February 1982, leaving only the Ironton Railroad connection, the line east of Seiple was abandoned on December 21, 1981. The remainder survived the breakup of Conrail to become the Norfolk Southern's C&F Secondary line. It is operated as a branch line from Alburtis, and serves a number of industrial customers in the Chapman area.
