= West Catasauqua, Pennsylvania =

Unincorporated community in Pennsylvania, US

- Unincorporated community
- Location within Pennsylvania Location within the United States
- Coordinates: 40°38′44″N 75°28′28″W
- Country: United States
- State: Pennsylvania
- County: Lehigh
- Township: Whitehall
- Elevation: 384 ft (117 m)

Population
  - Metro: 865,310 (US: 68th)
- Time zone: UTC-5 (Eastern (EST))
  - Summer (DST): UTC-4 (EDT)
- ZIP Code: 18052
- Area codes: 610 and 484
- GNIS feature ID: 1190942

West Catasauqua is an unincorporated village in Whitehall Township in Lehigh County, Pennsylvania. Once a port and station along the busy Lehigh Canal, it is colloquially known as West Catty. It is part of the Lehigh Valley, which has a population of 861,899 and is the 68th-most populous metropolitan area in the U.S. as of the 2020 census.

It uses the Whitehall Zip Code of 18052, and is directly across the Lehigh River from the mouth of Catasauqua Creek, the site of the first successful anthracite iron producing North American blast furnaces in 1839.

== Geography ==
West Catasauqua is located at 40°38′52″N 75°28′53″W (40.647895, -75.481828). The villages of Hokendauqua and Fullerton are directly to the north and south of the village, respectively. The borough of Catasauqua is to the east across the Lehigh River; two bridges connect West Catasauqua to Catasauqua. The bridges are known as Pine street and Race street. The majority of the residential area is within a triangle shape area in the south-eastern portion of the village in between the roads that the bridges are on.

An abandoned segment of the Lehigh Valley Railroad lies within the village along the Lehigh River, including an abandoned switch yard where the village meets Hokendauqua just north of the Pine Street bridge. The village also served as the eastern terminus of the Catasauqua and Fogelsville Railroad.

The West Catasauqua Playground is located in the geographical heart of the village along Pine Street. The West Catasauqua Fire Company as well as a Cetronia Ambulance Corps station are located within the village limits. The village is home also to two gasoline and oil "tank farm".

== Education ==
The community is served by the Whitehall-Coplay School District. Students in grades nine through 12 attend Whitehall High School in Whitehall Township.

== Township government ==
The village falls under the purview of the Whitehall Township government.

== Notable person ==
- Albert C. Vaughn, former U.S. Congressman
