= Longswamp Township, Pennsylvania =

Township in Pennsylvania, US

Longswamp Township
- Township
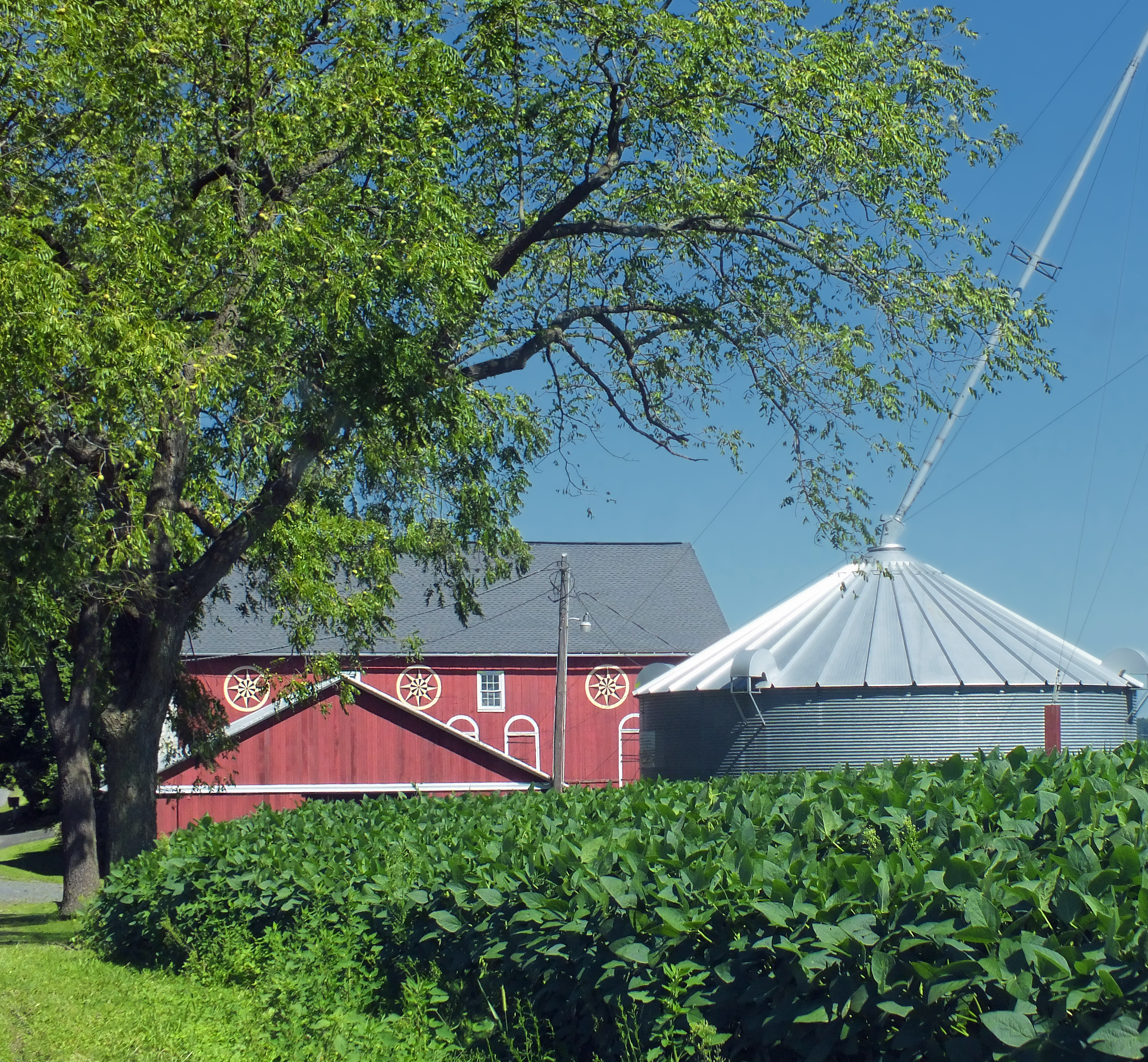
- A Longswamp Township barn with hex signs

- Flag Seal

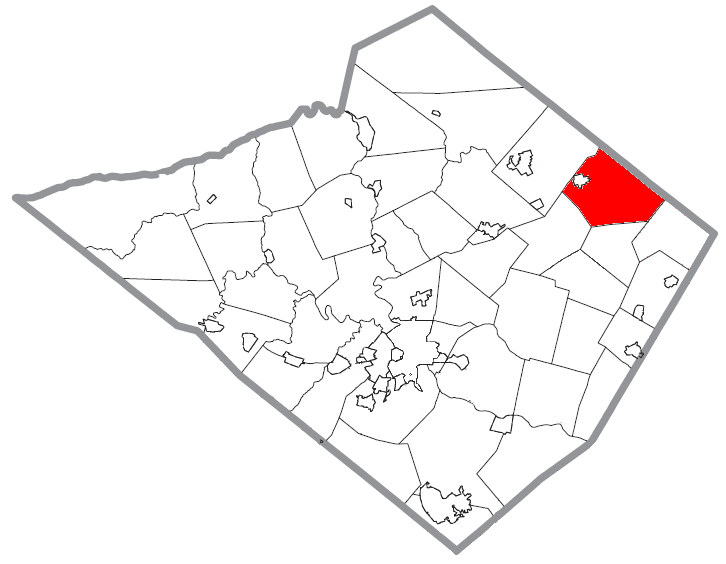
- Location of Longswamp Township in Berks County, Pennsylvania

- Location of Longswamp Township in Pennsylvania Longswamp Township (the United States)
- Coordinates: 40°30′03″N 75°37′26″W
- Country: United States
- State: Pennsylvania
- County: Berks

Area
  - Total: 22.86 sq mi (59.21 km^{2})
  - Land: 22.80 sq mi (59.05 km^{2})
  - Water: 0.062 sq mi (0.16 km^{2})
- Elevation: 525 ft (160 m)

Population (2020)
  - Total: 5,551 ▼
  - Estimate (2021): 5,551
  - Density: 249.2/sq mi (96.22/km^{2})
- Time zone: UTC-5 (EST)
  - Summer (DST): UTC-4 (EDT)
- ZIP Codes: 18011, 18062, 19539
- Area code: 610
- FIPS code: 42-011-44584
- Website: www.longswamptownship.org

Longswamp Township is a township in Berks County, Pennsylvania, United States. The population was 5,551 at the 2020 census.

== History ==
The Long-Hawerter Mill and Mary Ann Furnace Historic District are listed on the National Register of Historic Places.

== Recreation ==
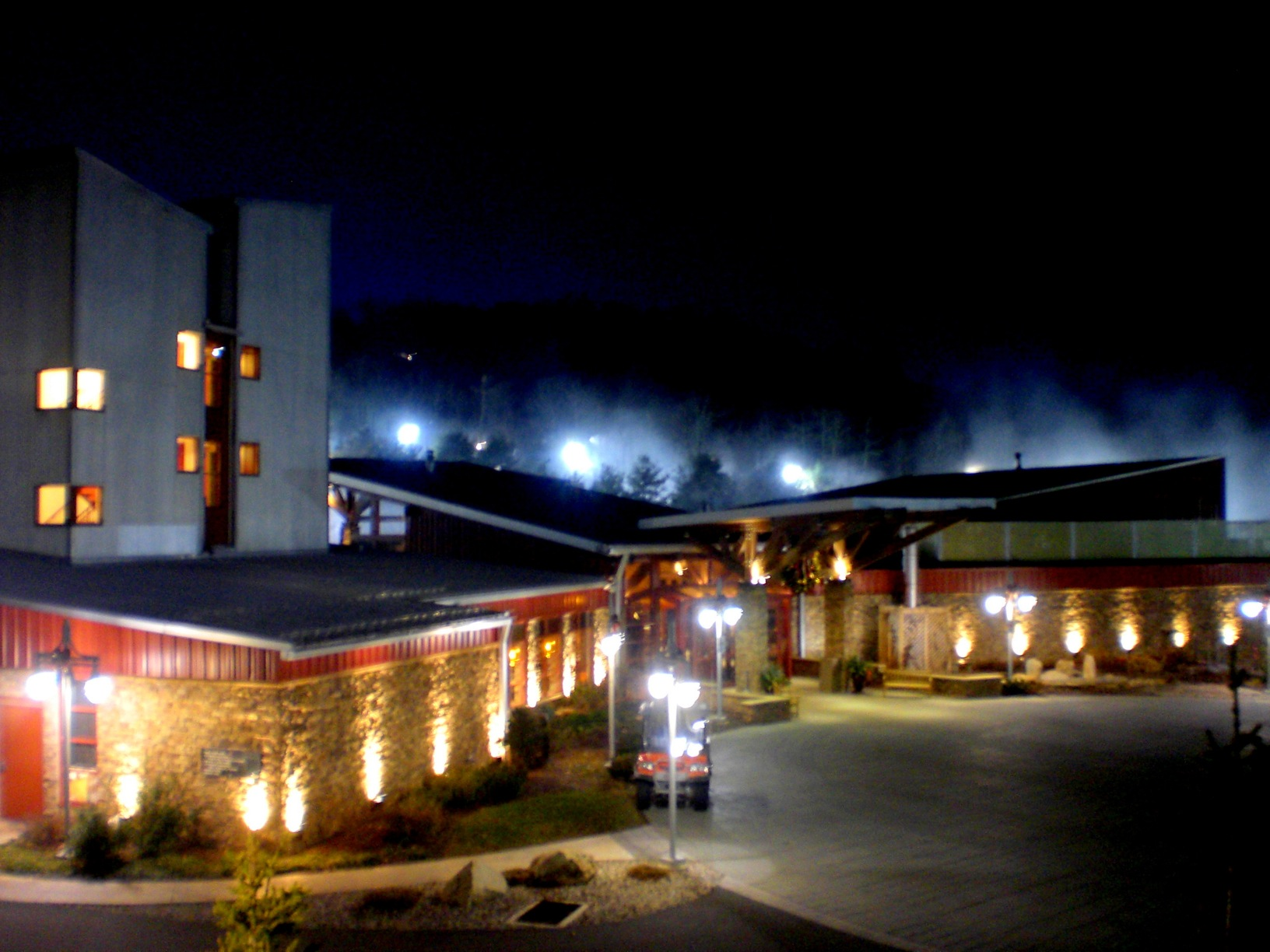
Bear Creek Mountain Resort, a 21-run ski resort in Longswamp Township, January 2012

Longswamp is home to Bear Creek Mountain Resort, just south of Maple Grove.

== Geography ==
According to the U.S. Census Bureau, the township has a total area of 22.8 square miles (59.1 km^{2}), of which 22.8 square miles (59.0 km^{2}) is land and 0.04 square mile (0.1 km^{2}) (0.09%) is water. The Little Lehigh Creek and Swabia Creek start in Longswamp and drain most of it eastward into the Lehigh River. The Schuylkill River also drains portions of the township via the Sacony Creek (which also starts in Longswamp) to the west and the Perkiomen Creek to the south. The southern half of Longswamp is located in the South Mountains.

Longswamp Township's villages include Farmington, Hancock, Henningsville, Longsdale, Longswamp, Maple Grove, Mertztown, New Hensingersville (also in Lehigh County,) Red Lion, Rittenhouse Gap, and Seisholtzville (also in Hereford Township.)

Longswamp surrounds the borough of Topton. It has a hot-summer humid continental climate (Dfa) and the hardiness zone is 6b. The average monthly temperatures in Mertztown range from 29.2 °F in January to 73.8 °F in July.

== Demographics ==
Historical population
Census	Pop.	Note	%±
1980	4,627		—
1990	5,387		16.4%
2000	5,608		4.1%
2010	5,679		1.3%
2020	5,551		−2.3%
2021 (est.)	5,551		0.0%
Source: US Census Bureau

As of the 2000 census, of 2000, there were 5,608 people, 2,029 households, and 1,529 families residing in the township. The population density was 246.1 inhabitants per square mile (95.0/km^{2}). There were 2,097 housing units at an average density of 92.0 per square mile (35.5/km^{2}). The racial makeup of the township was 98.95% White, 0.32% African American, 0.09% Native American, 0.25% Asian, 0.12% from other races, and 0.27% from two or more races. Hispanic or Latino of any race were 0.84% of the population.

There were 2,029 households, out of which 34.0% had children under the age of 18 living with them, 62.5% were married couples living together, 7.8% had a female householder with no husband present, and 24.6% were non-families. 19.2% of all households were made up of individuals, and 8.2% had someone living alone who was 65 years of age or older. The average household size was 2.61 and the average family size was 2.98.

In the township, the population was spread out, with 23.3% under the age of 18, 6.4% from 18 to 24, 28.7% from 25 to 44, 24.3% from 45 to 64, and 17.2% who were 65 years of age or older. The median age was 40 years. For every 100 females, there were 94.7 males. For every 100 females age 18 and over, there were 91.2 males.

The median income for a household in the township was $47,965, and the median income for a family was $55,238. Males had a median income of $35,434 versus $25,324 for females. The per capita income for the township was $21,592. About 2.9% of families and 3.9% of the population were below the poverty line, including 4.4% of those under age 18 and 12.4% of those age 65 or over.

== Transportation ==
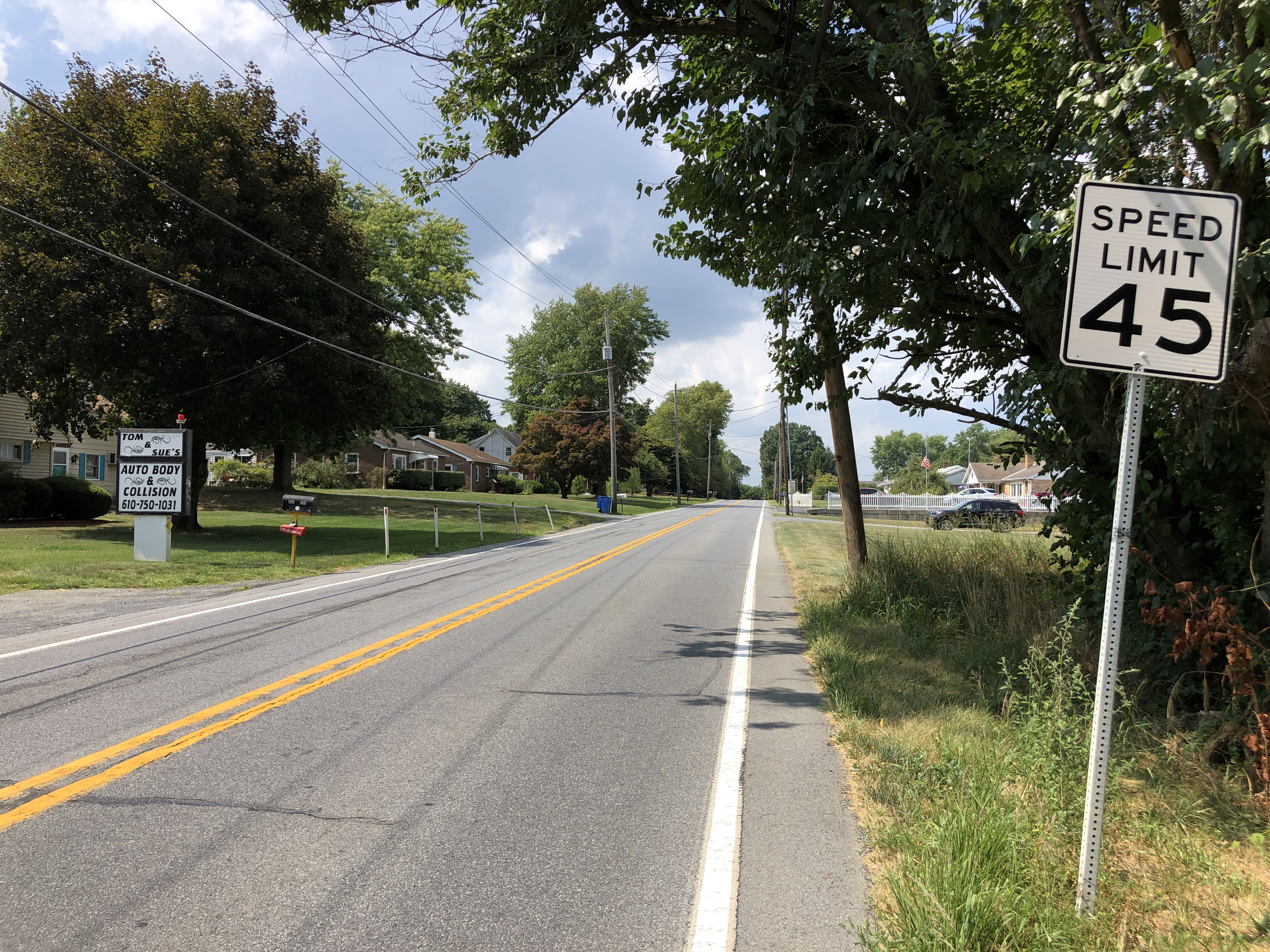
State Street in Longswamp Township

As of 2019, there were 67.21 miles (108.16 km) of public roads in Longswamp Township, of which 23.86 miles (38.40 km) were maintained by the Pennsylvania Department of Transportation (PennDOT) and 43.35 miles (69.77 km) were maintained by the township.

No numbered highways pass through Longswamp Township. The main east-to-west thoroughfare in the township is State Street, which is part of an unnumbered straight chain of roads connecting northeastern and central Berks County, as well as Topton with Lyons and Fleetwood. The mountains to the south prevent through north-to-south routes, so they start on State Street and extend either north to U.S. Route 222, as do Farmington Road, Topton Road, and Valley Road, or south up the mountain. Longswamp Road, Mertztown Road, and Mountain Road lead east into Lehigh County.
