= Maple Grove, Berks County, Pennsylvania =

Unincorporated community in Pennsylvania, US

Maple Grove, Pennsylvania
- Unincorporated community
- Location within Pennsylvania
- Coordinates: 40°29′28″N 75°36′55″W
- Country: United States
- State: Pennsylvania
- County: Berks
- Township: Longswamp
- Elevation: 509 ft (155 m)
- Time zone: UTC-5 (Eastern (EST))
  - Summer (DST): UTC-4 (EDT)
- ZIP Code: 18011
- Area codes: 610 and 484
- GNIS feature ID: 1180323

Maple Grove is an unincorporated community in Longswamp Township in Berks County, Pennsylvania, United States. Maple Grove is located near the intersection of State Street and Fairchild Street
