= Ironton, Pennsylvania =

Village in Pennsylvania, U.S.

Coordinates: 40°40′12″N 75°34′04″W

Ironton is a village in North Whitehall Township in Lehigh County, Pennsylvania, United States. It is part of the Lehigh Valley, which has a population of 861,899 and was the 68th-most populous metropolitan area in the U.S. as of the 2020 census.

It uses the Coplay ZIP Code of 18037 and is drained by the Coplay Creek into the Lehigh River.
