= Bear Creek Mountain Resort =

Ski area in Pennsylvania, United States

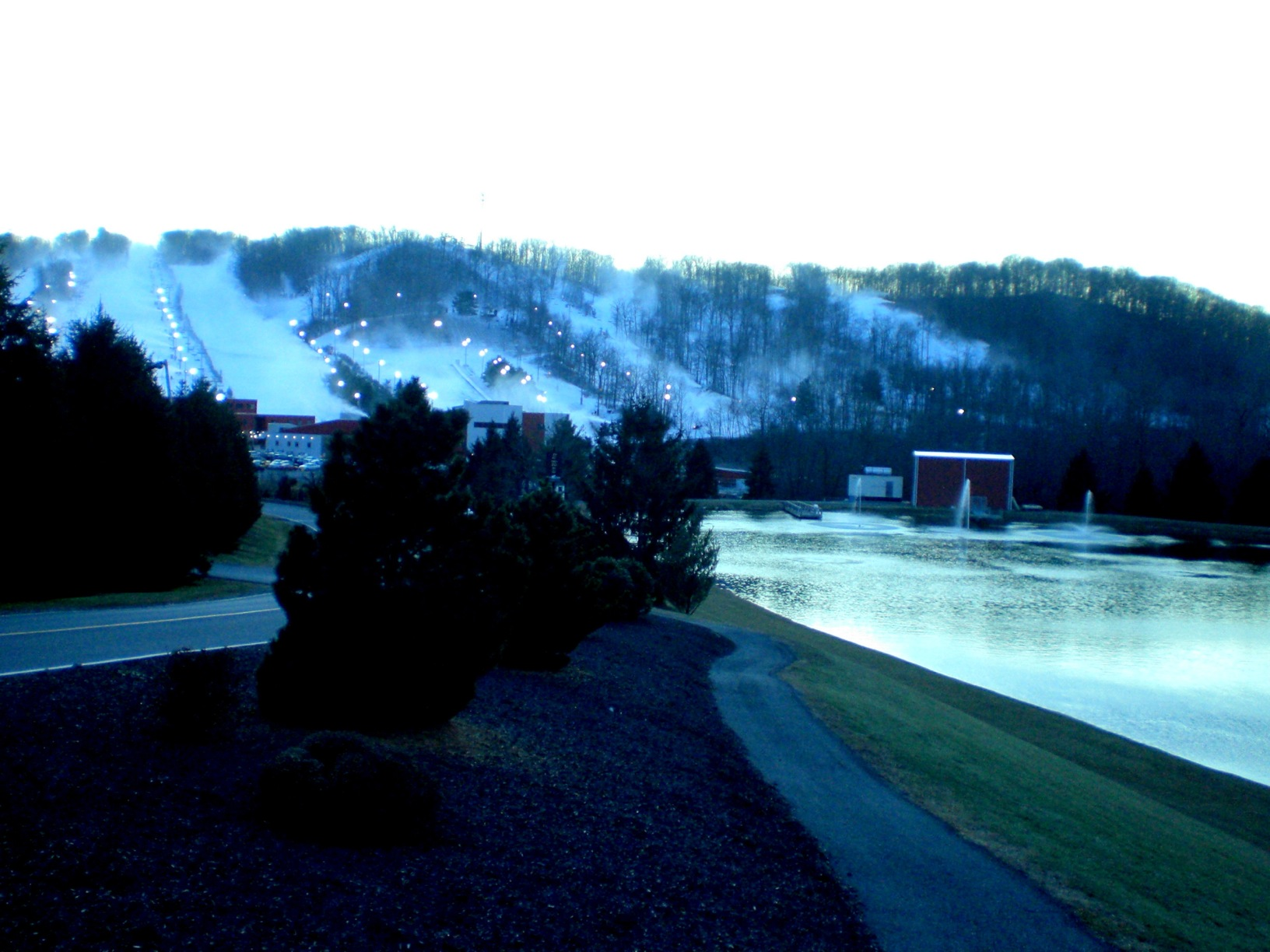
- Ski slopes at Bear Creek Ski Mountain Resort in January 2012
- Interactive map of Bear Creek Mountain Resort
- Location: Longswamp Township, Pennsylvania, U.S.
- Nearest major city: Allentown, Pennsylvania, U.S.
- Coordinates: 40°28′34″N 75°37′33″W
- Top elevation: 1,100 feet (340 m)
- Base elevation: 590 feet (180 m)
- Skiable area: 86 acres (350,000 m^{2})
- Trails: 21
- Longest run: 0.9 miles (1.4 km)
- Lift system: 7
- Terrain parks: 3
- Snowfall: 30 in/year
- Website: www.bcmr.com

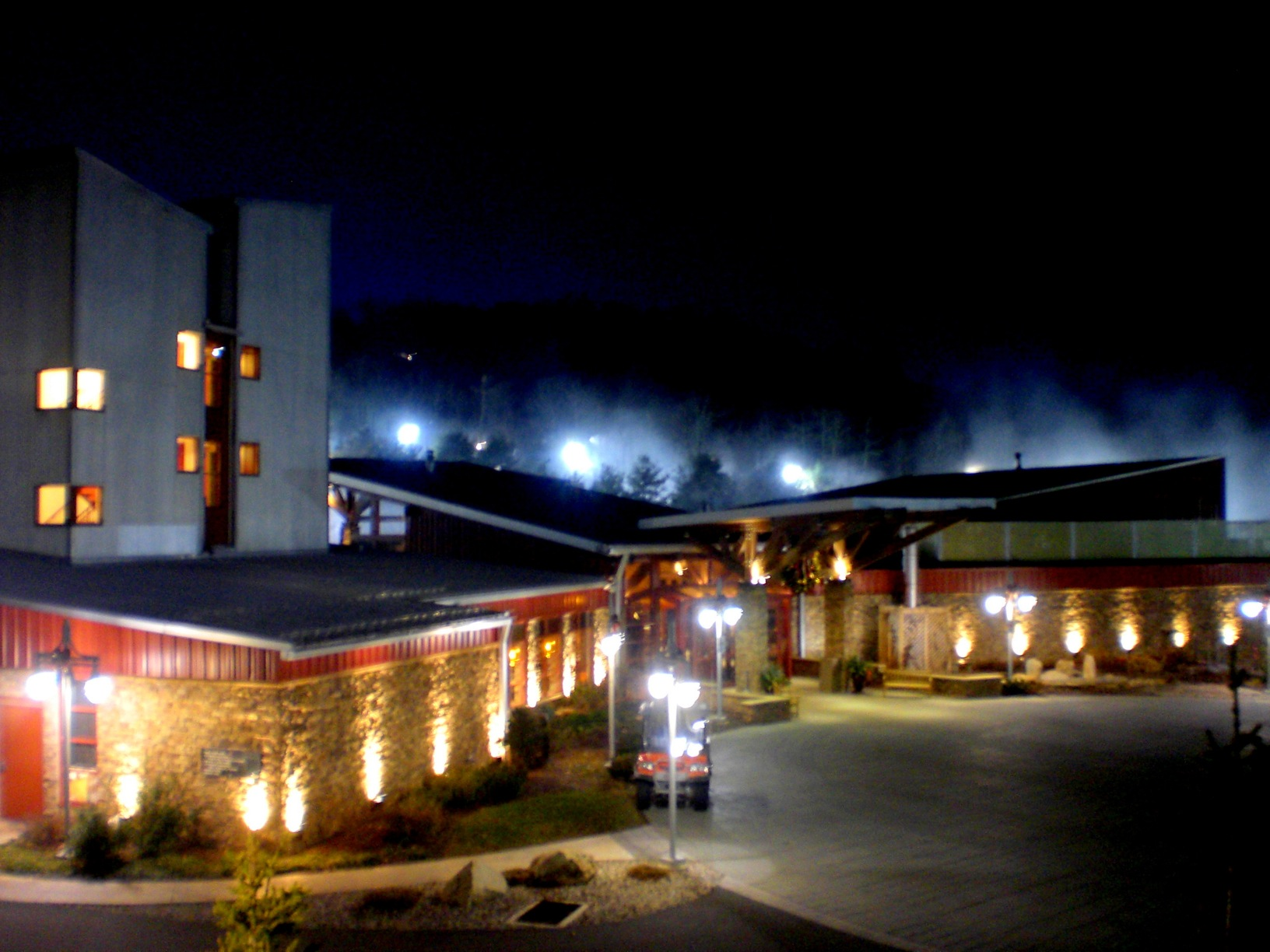
Bear Creek Ski Lodge in January 2012

Bear Creek is a ski resort in Longswamp Township, Pennsylvania, in the Lehigh Valley region of eastern Pennsylvania. The resort opened in 1967 and was known as the Doe Mountain until 1999. It is a year-round resort on more than 330 acres (1.3 km^{2}) that features a variety of activities and amenities.

Bear Creek Mountain has a summit elevation of 1,100 feet (340 m) and vertical elevation change of 510 ft (160 m). There are 86 acres (350,000 m^{2}) of skiing terrain. The longest run is 0.9 miles in length. The mountain has a total of 21 slopes and seven lifts.

It also features night skiing and snow tubing. The mountain summit receives an average of 30 inches (76 cm) of snowfall each winter. Bear Creek is the only ski resort in the Lehigh Valley though many ski resorts are located 30 miles (48 km) north of the Lehigh Valley, in the Pocono Mountains.

== Climate ==
According to the Trewartha climate classification system, Bear Creek Ski and Recreation Area has a Temperate Continental (Dc) Climate with warm summers (b) at the summit (hot summers (a) at the base), cold winters (o) and year-around precipitation. Dcbo climates are characterized by at least one month having an average mean temperature ≤ 32.0 °F (0 °C), four to seven months with an average mean temperature ≥ 50.0 °F (10 °C), all months with an average mean temperature < 72.0 °F (22 °C) (Dcba at the base ≥ 72.0 °F (22 °C)) and no significant precipitation difference between seasons. During the summer months at Bear Creek Ski and Recreation Area, episodes of extreme heat and humidity can occur with heat index values ≥ 100 °F (38 °C). The annual peak in thunderstorm activity is July.

During the winter months, episodes of extreme cold and wind can occur with wind chill values < −15 °F (−26 °C). The plant hardiness zone is 6b with an average annual extreme minimum air temperature of −4.8 °F (−20 °C) at the summit and −4.6 °F (−20 °C) at the base. The average seasonal (Nov-Apr) snowfall total is between 30 and 36 inches (76 and 91 cm). Ice storms and large snowstorms depositing ≥ 12 inches (30 cm) of snow can occur, particularly during nor’easters from December through February.

Climate data for Bear Creek Summit (Elevation: 1135 ft (346 m))
Month	Jan	Feb	Mar	Apr	May	Jun	Jul	Aug	Sep	Oct	Nov	Dec	Year
Mean daily maximum °F (°C)	38.2 (3.4)	40.8 (4.9)	51.5 (10.8)	61.0 (16.1)	71.1 (21.7)	79.3 (26.3)	82.4 (28.0)	81.6 (27.6)	75.2 (24.0)	63.8 (17.7)	53.5 (11.9)	41.2 (5.1)	61.7 (16.5)
Daily mean °F (°C)	28.7 (−1.8)	30.8 (−0.7)	39.7 (4.3)	49.4 (9.7)	59.1 (15.1)	68.0 (20.0)	71.8 (22.1)	70.7 (21.5)	63.6 (17.6)	52.3 (11.3)	42.9 (6.1)	32.5 (0.3)	50.9 (10.5)
Mean daily minimum °F (°C)	19.2 (−7.1)	20.8 (−6.2)	27.8 (−2.3)	37.8 (3.2)	47.1 (8.4)	56.6 (13.7)	61.2 (16.2)	59.8 (15.4)	52.0 (11.1)	40.8 (4.9)	32.4 (0.2)	23.7 (−4.6)	40.0 (4.4)
Average precipitation inches (mm)	3.42 (87)	2.78 (71)	3.69 (94)	4.00 (102)	4.48 (114)	4.61 (117)	5.06 (129)	4.00 (102)	4.80 (122)	4.33 (110)	3.92 (100)	3.88 (99)	48.97 (1,244)
Average relative humidity (%)	66.9	64.1	57.0	58.4	62.5	69.4	70.8	72.2	72.0	70.2	67.6	70.0	66.8
Average dew point °F (°C)	19.1 (−7.2)	20.1 (−6.6)	25.7 (−3.5)	35.4 (1.9)	46.3 (7.9)	57.6 (14.2)	61.8 (16.6)	61.3 (16.3)	54.4 (12.4)	42.9 (6.1)	32.9 (0.5)	23.8 (−4.6)	37.6 (3.1)
Source: PRISM

Climate data for Bear Creek Base (Elevation: 676 ft (206 m))
Month	Jan	Feb	Mar	Apr	May	Jun	Jul	Aug	Sep	Oct	Nov	Dec	Year
Mean daily maximum °F (°C)	37.6 (3.1)	40.7 (4.8)	50.6 (10.3)	61.5 (16.4)	71.7 (22.1)	79.9 (26.6)	82.9 (28.3)	82.2 (27.9)	75.7 (24.3)	64.3 (17.9)	53.0 (11.7)	41.0 (5.0)	61.9 (16.6)
Daily mean °F (°C)	28.6 (−1.9)	31.0 (−0.6)	39.4 (4.1)	49.8 (9.9)	59.6 (15.3)	68.5 (20.3)	72.3 (22.4)	71.2 (21.8)	64.0 (17.8)	52.6 (11.4)	42.8 (6.0)	32.5 (0.3)	51.1 (10.6)
Mean daily minimum °F (°C)	19.5 (−6.9)	21.3 (−5.9)	28.2 (−2.1)	38.1 (3.4)	47.5 (8.6)	57.1 (13.9)	61.6 (16.4)	60.2 (15.7)	52.2 (11.2)	41.0 (5.0)	32.6 (0.3)	24.0 (−4.4)	40.4 (4.7)
Average precipitation inches (mm)	3.39 (86)	2.76 (70)	3.65 (93)	3.96 (101)	4.42 (112)	4.55 (116)	5.00 (127)	3.97 (101)	4.77 (121)	4.28 (109)	3.87 (98)	3.85 (98)	48.47 (1,231)
Average relative humidity (%)	68.4	65.0	58.6	58.4	62.3	69.4	70.8	72.2	72.0	70.3	68.9	70.9	67.3
Average dew point °F (°C)	19.5 (−6.9)	20.6 (−6.3)	26.1 (−3.3)	35.8 (2.1)	46.7 (8.2)	58.1 (14.5)	62.3 (16.8)	61.8 (16.6)	54.8 (12.7)	43.2 (6.2)	33.3 (0.7)	24.1 (−4.4)	37.6 (3.1)
Source: PRISM

== In popular culture ==
- Bam Margera visited Bear Creek for a portion of his television series, Viva La Bam. During his visit, the band Clutch performed at the bottom of the tubing hill. The resort's name was changed from Doe Mountain as a marketing strategy to avoid being characterized as a small ski area.
- The first Tough Mudder event ever was held at Bear Creek Mountain resort on May 2, 2010. Promoted exclusively through Facebook advertising and word of mouth, the event drew more than 4,500 participants.
