= Thomas Iron Company =

- Lock Ridge Furnance Complex
- U.S. National Register of Historic Places
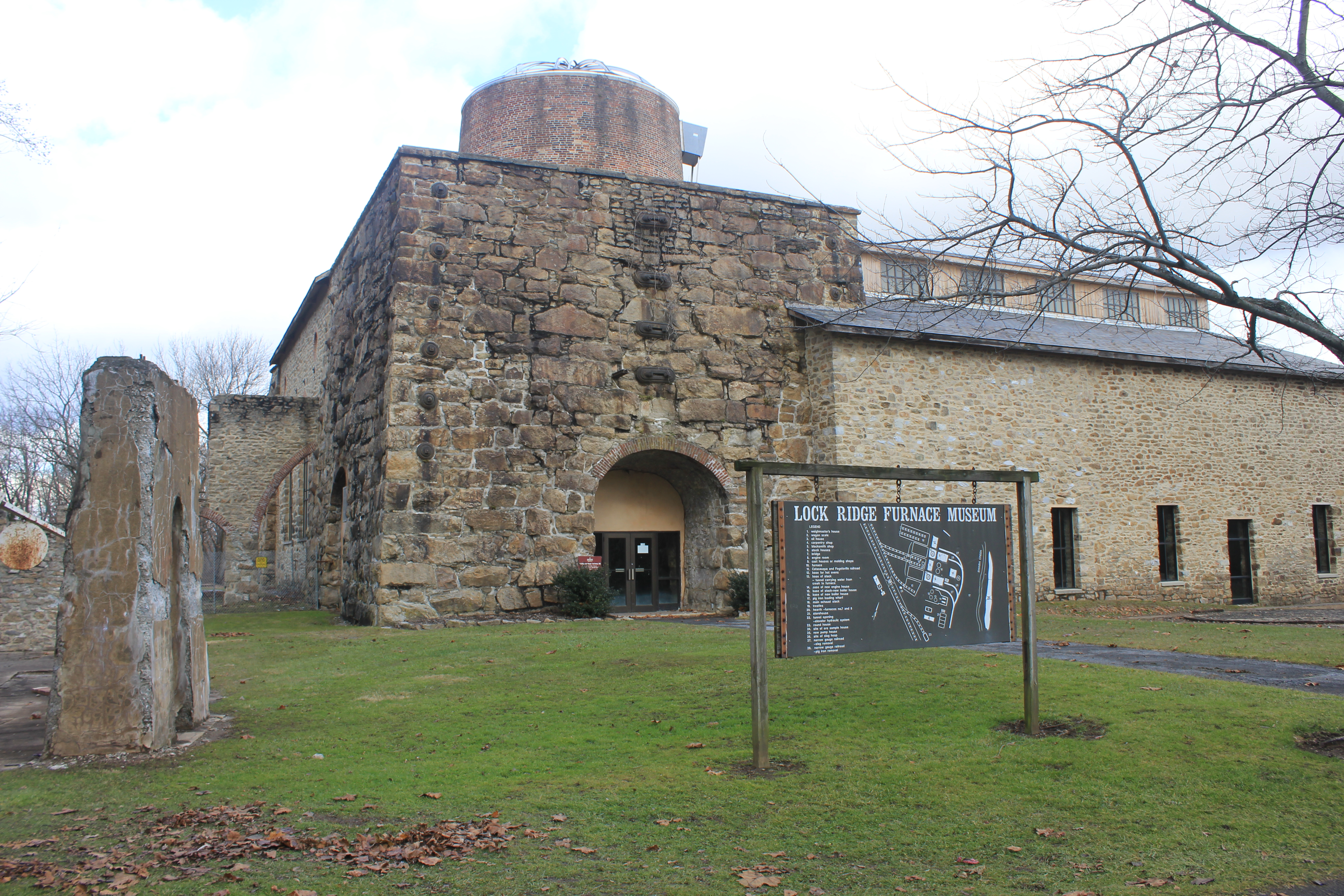
- The Lock Ridge Furnace Complex in Alburtis, Pennsylvania, in December 2012

- Location within Pennsylvania
- Location: Franklin and Church Sts., Alburtis, Pennsylvania
- Coordinates: 40°30′32″N 75°35′39″W
- Area: 6 acres (2.4 ha)
- Built: 1868
- Architect: Lock Ridge Iron Co.
- Architectural style: Gothic
- NRHP reference No.: 81000547
- Added to NRHP: September 11, 1981

The Thomas Iron Company was a major iron-making firm in Hokendauqua, Pennsylvania in the Lehigh Valley region of eastern Pennsylvania from its founding in 1854 until its decline and eventual dismantling in the early 20th century.

The company was named in honor of its founder, David Thomas, who emigrated to the United States in 1839 to introduce hot blast iron making in the Lehigh Valley, and later embarked on an independent ironmaking venture.

Thomas Iron Company's main and original plant in Hokendauqua, inspired the growth of the town that grew up around it. The company also later acquired its own blast furnaces and railroads elsewhere in the Lehigh Valley and mines in both Pennsylvania and New Jersey.

Changes in the iron industry in the early 20th century left Thomas Iron struggling to compete. After a failed attempt at modernization and revival between 1913 and 1916, the company's assets were sold and largely dismantled during the 1920s.

== History ==
=== 19th century ===
David Thomas, a Welsh ironmaster, arrived in the United States in 1839, where he introduced the hot blast manufacture of anthracite iron by the Lehigh Crane Iron Company. Thomas founded his own company, which was organized on February 14, 1854 and chartered on April 4, 1854; it was named in his honor. Thomas left his post as superintendent at Lehigh Crane and was replaced by his son, David Jr. He became trustee of real estate, while his other son, Samuel, was appointed superintendent.

Samuel Thomas began working for his father at Lehigh Crane in 1843, and he also supervised the construction and blowing-in of a furnace at the Boonton Iron Works in Boonton, New Jersey in 1848. Under his direction, the company built two furnaces on the Butz farm along the Lehigh River in present-day Hockendauqua. Furnace No. 1 was put in blast on June 3, 1855, and Furnace No. 2 on October 27, 1855. Some ore was supplied from local limonite deposits.

In 1875, Thomas Iron owned four of these mines and held a fifth jointly with Crane Iron, leased eight, and had worked another for two years. The company joined with Crane Iron, which had chartered the Catasauqua and Fogelsville Railroad in 1854, to begin construction in 1856.

The rail line reduced difficult and inefficient wagon haulage to supply local ore to both companies. Thomas Iron also bought the Richard Mine near Mount Hope, New Jersey in 1856, which supplied large quantities of magnetite ore. Some magnetite was also obtained from mines at Rittenhouse Gap, at the south end of the Catasauqua and Fogelsville.

The Hokendauqua site had its own plant railroad, constructed in the 1860s, which included a line of about a mile and a half to connect with the Ironton Railroad at West Coplay. The mines served by this railroad at Ironton were mostly operated by Thomas Iron.

The plant railroad also connected with the Catasauqua and Fogelsville and the Lehigh Valley Railroad at West Catasauqua, allowing it to receive ore and ship iron.

Under the leadership of the Thomases, father and son, Thomas Iron produced record quantities of iron, and was looked upon as an exemplar of the iron industry. New furnaces were built at Hokendauqua: No. 3 was blown in on July 18, 1862 and No. 4 on April 29, 1863. On December 26, 1866, Samuel Thomas and other officials of Thomas Iron chartered the Lock Ridge Iron Company, which began building two furnaces at Alburtis in 1867.

The first furnace was placed in blast on March 18, 1868. Lock Ridge Iron was bought by Thomas Iron on May 1, 1869, and the second furnace placed in blast on July 9, 1869. This facility had its own small plant railroad, which connected with the East Pennsylvania Railroad, which later became the Reading and the Catasauqua and Fogelsville. Two more furnaces were built at Hokendauqua after the Civil War, No. 5 blown in on September 15, 1873 and No. 6 on January 19, 1874. The two Lock Ridge furnaces were later renumbered No. 7 and No. 8.

After 1874, the company did not add any further furnaces at Hokendauqua. However, it purchased the Keystone Furnace from D. Runkle Company in early 1882 and the Saucon Iron Company in Hellertown, Pennsylvania on December 13, 1884, renaming its two furnaces No. 10 and No. 11. It leased the Lucy Furnace from 1886 to 1887.

In 1881, a cinder notch was added to No. 8 furnace at Lock Ridge, an innovation which allowed removal of slag from the furnace during the blast. The operators initially struggled with fine-dirt problems after the change, and it was only eliminated when the furnace burnt out part of the lining. The furnace was re-lined to the new geometry and found to be much more efficient, and No. 7 and No. 2 furnaces were remodeled in the same fashion at the end of 1881. The other furnaces of the company were remodeled as they came out of blast. In 1882, Thomas Iron took over the Ironton Railroad.

During the 1890s, as the local limonite industry declined and railroad transportation improved, Thomas Iron switched from using local ore to hematite from Michigan or overseas. However, they continued to use New Jersey magnetite.

By 1891, the company's Richard Mine was the largest producer of ore in New Jersey. The declining importance of local ore also prompted Crane and Thomas to divest themselves of the Catasauqua and Fogelsville: 60% of the stock in the railroad was sold to the Reading in 1890, which leased it in 1893.

In 1891, the company began another round of upgrades, adding Durham-style regenerative-heating stoves to No. 6 and No. 7 stacks. In 1893, No. 1 and No. 2 stacks were abandoned: No. 1 was demolished and rebuilt with the new stoves, which were also added to No. 10 and No. 11 furnaces (former Saucon Iron). 1893 also marked the accession of Benjamin Franklin Fackenthal Jr., as president of the company: he would oversee the last halcyon period in the history of Thomas Iron.

Modernization continued, with No. 3 stack being rebuilt in 1897, and No. 5 abandoned. New Taws & Hartman stoves were fitted to No. 1 in 1898, and No. 3 in 1899. No. 4 was abandoned in 1902. The company began to reorganize its railroad interests, incorporating the line from West Catasauqua to Coplay as the Thomas Railroad on December 21, 1906. The line was leased to the connecting Ironton Railroad on January 1, 1908. Old stack No. 8, at Alburtis, was fitted with a Durham-style stove in 1910.

=== 20th century ===
By the beginning of the 20th century, the iron industry was rapidly evolving. In addition to the shift from local to foreign ores, coke largely replaced anthracite as the principal furnace fuel. No. 7 and 8 stacks in Alburtis, Pennsylvania were reputedly the last furnaces in the country to use anthracite, converting to coke in 1914. The shift away from local ores and fuels eliminated much of the original competitive advantage of the Lehigh Valley furnaces.

Fackenthal resigned on May 1, 1913, after recommending a program of retrenchment and abandonment of the old furnaces at Alburtis. His successor, chosen on July 1, 1913, was Ralph H. Sweetser, who held largely opposite views. Sweetser modernized the No. 1 and No. 3 stacks in Hokendauqua, Pennsylvania, but the old No. 7 stack at Alburtis. He also attempted to restart local limonite mining, an effort which proved a costly failure. By 1915, No. 6 stack at Hokendauqua had been abandoned (leaving only No. 1 and No. 3 in operation there). The limestone flux for the furnaces, until now obtained from local dolomitic limestone quarries, was now replaced by high-calcium lime from Annville Township, Pennsylvania, eliminating the last local source of raw materials.

Sweetser resigned on July 1, 1916, and was succeeded by William A. Barrows Jr., but the company was now in terminal decline. Keystone Furnace was sold off to the Northern Ore Company on June 28, 1917. On December 4, 1917, the Thomas Railroad was merged into the Ironton, which by this time primarily carried cement instead of iron ore. In 1918, the No. 11 stack (former Saucon Iron) was rebuilt, but No. 10 was abandoned.

Dismantling of the company now began in earnest. The last iron was made in Alburtis in 1921, and Hokendauqua had already discontinued iron production. No. 11 at Hellertown produced a small quantity. On June 30, 1922, the company's stock was sold to Drexel & Company, which disposed of its assets over the next few years. stocks were sold to the Reading Railroad, Lehigh Valley Railroad, and Central Railroad of New Jersey; Reading Railroad and Lehigh Valley Road became joint owners of Ironton Railroad.

The furnaces and other assets, including the Richard Mine, were sold to the Reading Coal and Iron Company, which sold the Alburtis and Hellertown plants for scrap. No. 1 stack was quickly abandoned in 1924, leaving only No. 3, renamed "Mary Furnace" in operation at Hokendauqua. It, too, was abandoned in 1927, and the Hokendauqua plant was sold to Bethlehem Steel, which scrapped it in 1936. The company surrendered its charter in June 1942.
