= Pennsylvania Highlands Region =

Region in a section of the Appalachian Mountains located in Eastern Pennsylvania

Coordinates: 40.32°N 75.48°W

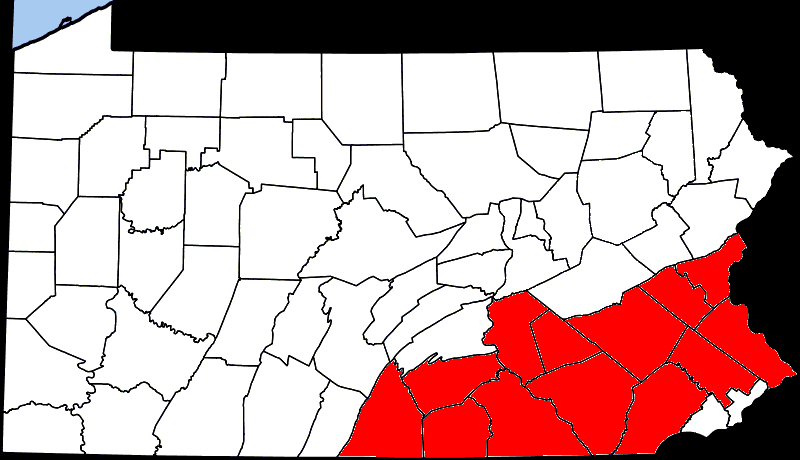
Counties comprising the Pennsylvania Highlands Region

The Pennsylvania Highlands region is a section of the Appalachian Mountains located in Eastern Pennsylvania frequently cited as a candidate for extensive ecological preservation.

The region is home to around 5 million people, with majority of it residing within the eastern half it. Population growth and suburban sprawl occurred in the seventies, and continues to rapidly increase. Every county saw growth from 1990 to 2000 and from 2000 to 2005. The region near Philadelphia is very densely populated, but population density decreases to the west. One onset of such rapid growth has come from immigrants, with extensive influxes of Asian, European, and African peoples to the eastern counties, and Hispanic peoples region wide especially in counties such as Berks, Lehigh, and Lancaster.

The heavily forested region is seen as ecologically significant because, among other things, its dense forests serve to protect and supply clean drinking water to more than 15 million people, including large portions of both New Jersey and New York. The Pennsylvania Highlands also possess acknowledgement as a rural vacationing area and have even been recognized by the U.S. Forest Service as a "landscape of national significance" and by the State of New Jersey as a "Special Resource Area", none of which helps to protect it from the urban sprawl which threatens its natural resources each year.

== Counties ==
- Adams County
- Berks County
- Bucks County
- Chester County
- Cumberland County
- Dauphin County
- Franklin County
- Lancaster County
- Lehigh County
- Lebanon County
- Montgomery County
- Northampton County
- York County

== See also ==
- New York–New Jersey Highlands
