= Alburtis, Pennsylvania =

Borough in Pennsylvania, US

- Borough
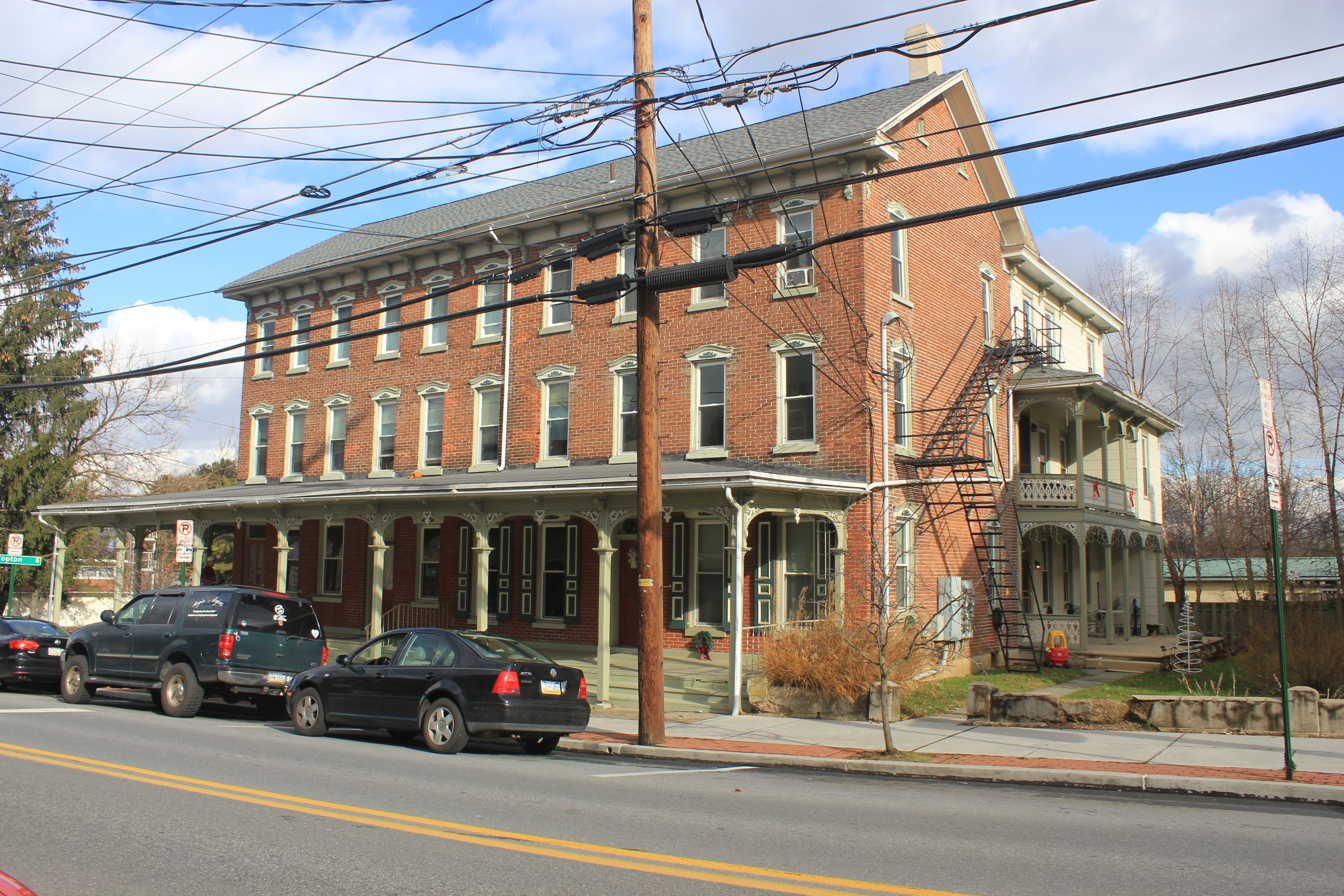
- George F. Schlicher Hotel in Alburtis in December 2012

- Seal

- Location of Alburtis in Lehigh County, Pennsylvania (left) and of Lehigh County in Pennsylvania (right)

- Location of Alburtis in Pennsylvania Alburtis (the United States)
- Coordinates: 40°30′36″N 75°36′07″W
- Country: United States
- State: Pennsylvania
- County: Lehigh

Area
  - Borough: 0.71 sq mi (1.83 km^{2})
  - Land: 0.71 sq mi (1.83 km^{2})
  - Water: 0 sq mi (0.00 km^{2})
- Elevation: 472 ft (144 m)

Population (2020)
  - Borough: 2,596
  - Density: 3,672.2/sq mi (1,417.85/km^{2})
  - Metro: 865,310 (US: 68th)
- Time zone: UTC-5 (EST)
  - Summer (DST): UTC-4 (EDT)
- ZIP Code: 18011
- Area code: 610
- FIPS code: 42-00660
- Primary airport: Lehigh Valley International Airport
- Major hospital: Lehigh Valley Hospital–Cedar Crest
- School district: East Penn
- Website: http://www.alburtis.org

Alburtis is a borough in Lehigh County, Pennsylvania, United States. The borough's population was 2,596 as of the 2020 census. It is a suburb of Allentown, the third largest city in Pennsylvania. It is part of the Lehigh Valley metropolitan area, which had a population of 861,899 and was the 68th-most populous metropolitan area in the U.S. as of the 2020 census.

== Geography ==
According to the U.S. Census Bureau, the borough has a total area of 0.7 square miles (1.8 km^{2}), all land. The Alburtis ZIP Code, 18011, comprises two separate areas stretching from south of Trexlertown into the district township in neighboring Berks County. Alburtis has a hot-summer humid continental climate (Dfa) and is in hardiness zone 6b. Average monthly temperatures range from 29.1 °F in January to 73.6 °F in July.

== History ==
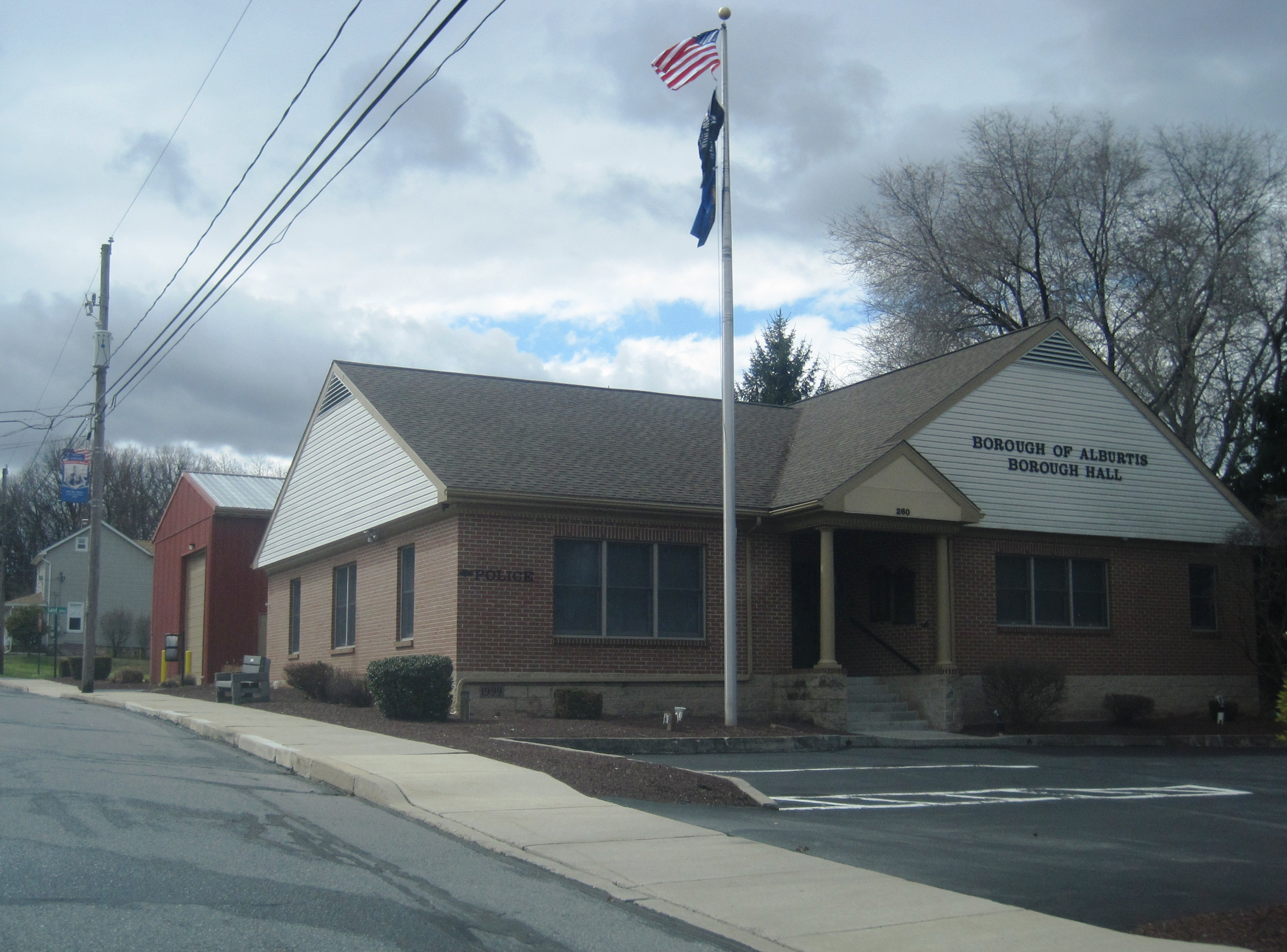
Alburtis Borough Hall

Alburtis was incorporated on May 9, 1913, by the merger of two villages, Alburtis and Lock Ridge, both of which were settled in the mid-1800s. Alburtis was named for Edward K. Alburtis, a civil engineer involved in the construction of the East Pennsylvania Branch of the Philadelphia and Reading Railway. When a railroad station was established in the village in 1859, the railroad's board of directors named the town in his honor.

A tract adjacent to Alburtis was purchased by the Lockridge Iron Company for the construction of blast furnaces in the late 1860s. This area, which grew into a separate village, is known as Lock Ridge Park.

The Thomas Iron Company and George F. Schlicher Hotel, both in Alburtis, have been named to the National Register of Historic Places in recognition of their historical significance to the nation.

== Demographics ==
Historical population
Census	Pop.	Note	%±
1880	500		—
1920	795		—
1930	823		3.5%
1940	885		7.5%
1950	979		10.6%
1960	1,086		10.9%
1970	1,142		5.2%
1980	1,428		25.0%
1990	1,415		−0.9%
2000	2,117		49.6%
2010	2,361		11.5%
2020	2,596		10.0%

As of the 2000 census, there were 2,117 people, 774 households and 593 families residing in the borough. The population density was 2,993.2 inhabitants per square mile (1,155.7/km^{2}). There were 799 housing units at an average density of 1,129.7 per square mile (436.2/km^{2}). The racial makeup of the borough was 97.21% White, 0.33% African American, 0.05% Native American, 1.42% Asian, 0.24% Pacific Islander, 0.24% from other races, and 0.52% from two or more races. Hispanic or Latino of any race were 0.85% of the population.

There were 774 households, of which 42.6% had children under the age of 18 living with them, 62.5% were married couples living together, 9.2% had a female householder with no husband present, and 23.3% were non-families. 18.9% of all households were made up of individuals, and 5.6% had someone living alone who was 65 years of age or older. The average household size was 2.74 and the average family size was 3.13.

In the borough, the population was spread out, with 29.7% of the population under the age of 18, 6.5% from 18 to 24, 38.6% from 25 to 44, 17.9% from 45 to 64, and 7.3% who were 65 years of age or older. The median age was 33 years. For every 100 females there were 99.5 males. For every 100 females age 18 and over, there were 97.7 males. The median income for a household in the borough was $52,361, and the median income for a family was $57,863. Males had a median income of $36,915 compared with $27,094 for females. The per capita income for the borough was $20,611. About 2.8% of families and 3.4% of the population were below the poverty line, including 3.4% of those under age 18 and 8.8% of those age 65 or over.

== Politics ==
United States presidential election results for Alburtis, Pennsylvania
Year	Republican		Democratic		Third party(ies)	
Year	No.	%	No.	%	No.	%
2024	737	53.17%	624	45.02%	25	1.80%
2020	719	51.21%	653	46.51%	32	2.28%
2020	719	51.21%	653	46.51%	32	2.28%
2016	600	52.17%	495	43.04%	55	4.78%
2012	494	50.25%	473	48.12%	16	1.63%
2008	449	42.32%	591	55.70%	21	1.98%
2004	446	48.64%	452	49.29%	19	2.07%

== Education ==
Alburtis is served by East Penn School District. Emmaus High School in Emmaus serves grades nine through twelve. Eyer Middle School and Lower Macungie Middle School, both in Macungie, serve grades six through eight. One of the district's seven elementary schools, Alburtis Elementary School, is located in Alburtis.

== Recreation ==
Lock Ridge Park is the predominant public park in Alburtis. Swabia Creek flows through the park and borough. The borough also includes a community center, pool, and several baseball fields.

Alburtis is the current home of the Frankford Radio Club, a long-running amateur radio club founded at Frankford High School in Philadelphia around 1927.

== Transportation ==
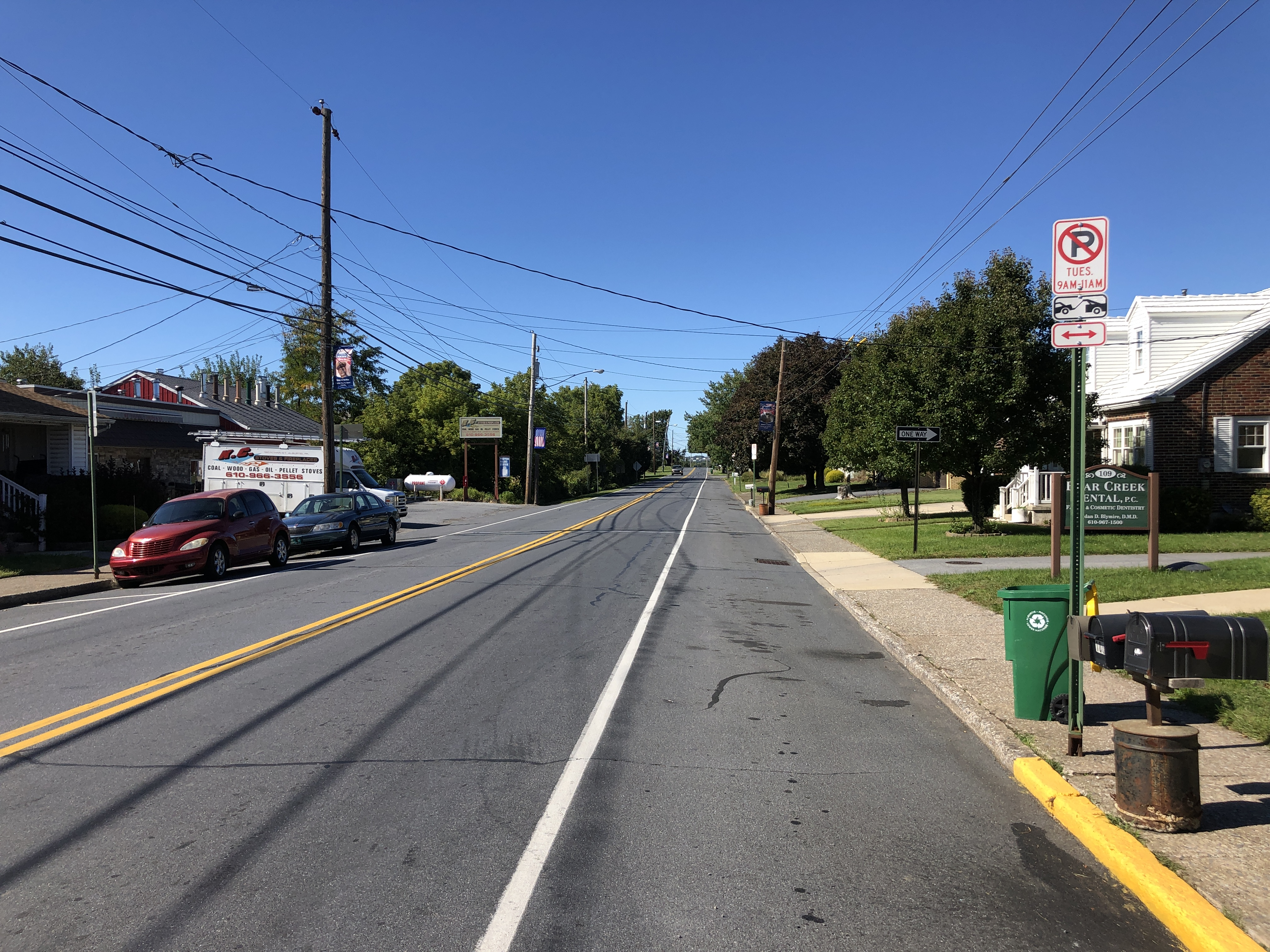
Main Street in Alburtis in September 2022

As of 2011, there were 8.49 miles (13.66 km) of public roads in Alburtis, of which 2.27 miles (3.65 km) were maintained by the Pennsylvania Department of Transportation (PennDOT) and 6.22 miles (10.01 km) were maintained by the borough.

No numbered highways served Alburtis directly. Main thoroughfares through the borough include Franklin Street, Main Street, Penn Avenue and Front Street. The nearest numbered highway is Pennsylvania Route 100.

== Notable person ==
- Gibby Hatton, former track cyclist
