= Coplan =

Coplan is a surname. Notable people with the surname include:

- Francis Coplan, fictional character
- Maxwell Frederic Coplan (1912–1985), American photographer
- Shayne Coplan (born 1998), American billionaire technologist, Polymarket
- William F. Coplan (c. 1795–?), American politician

== See also ==
- John Coplans (1920–2003), British artist, art writer, curator, and museum director
