= William G. Barthold =

American politician

The Honorable William Gregory Barthold

Northampton County President Judge
- In office 1948–1969

Northampton County Judge
- In office 1938–1947

Member of the Pennsylvania Senate from the 18th district
- In office 1937–1938
- Preceded by: Warren R. Roberts
- Succeeded by: Charles A.P. Bartlett

Bethlehem School District Solicitor
- In office 1934–1937

Northampton County Solicitor for Sheriff
- In office 1934–1935

Northampton County District attorney
- In office 1928–1932

Freemansburg Solicitor
- In office 1924–1942

Personal details
- Born: December 12, 1897 Philadelphia
- Died: September 22, 1969 (aged 71) Bethlehem, Pennsylvania
- Party: Democratic
- Spouse: Frances Katherine Werkheiser
- Children: 2
- Education: Lehigh University B.A. Harvard Law School LL. B
- Occupation: Lawyer

William Gregory Barthold was an American politician from Pennsylvania who served in the Pennsylvania State Senate, representing the 18th district from 1937 to 1938 as well as serving as a Judge in Northampton County from 1938 until his death in 1969.

== Biography ==
Barthold was born in Philadelphia on December 12, 1897, to Allen H. and Emma A. Barthold. His family moved to Bethlehem while he was still a child. He attended the Bethlehem High School graduating as Valedictorian of the class of 1914. He attended Lehigh University, graduating with a Bachelor of Arts in 1918. He went on to study law at the Harvard Law School, graduating with a Bachelor of Laws in 1922.

Barthold opened a legal practice in Bethlehem right out of college until he was elected the Solicitor of neighboring Freemansburg in 1924, an office he would hold until 1942. He was elected the District Attorney of Northampton County, Pennsylvania for a term from 1928 to 1932. He was then elected the solicitor for Sheriff for Northampton County for a year from 1934 to 1935, then he was elected the solicitor of the Bethlehem School District from 1934 to 1937.

In 1937 Barthold was elected as a Democratic to represent the 18th district of the Pennsylvania State Senate for a term until 1938. He declined to seek another term and instead was elected a judge in Northampton county. He would serve as a judge until 1947 when he ran to become the President Judge of Northampton county. Winning and serving in that position until 1969. While he was president judge in 1948 he was awarded an Honorary Doctorate from Moravian College.

Barthold died on September 22, 1969, at the age of 71 while in office. He was buried in the Nisky Hill Cemetery in Bethlehem.

== Personal life ==
Barthold married Frances Katherine Née Werkheiser in 1925. The couple had two children, both daughters; Jeanne Audre Barthold and Nancy G. Barthold. Barthold was a member of the United Church of Christ. He was also a member of the board of trustees for Cedar Crest College, St. Luke's Hospital and was on the advisory board for the Salvation Army and the Bethlehem YMCA. He was a member of the Saucon Valley Country Club and served on the board of several local charities.
