= Sheshequin =

Sheshequin may refer to:

- Sheshequin, Pennsylvania
- Sheshequin Township, Pennsylvania
