= Jeanette Reibman =

American politician (1915–2006)

Jeanette F. Reibman
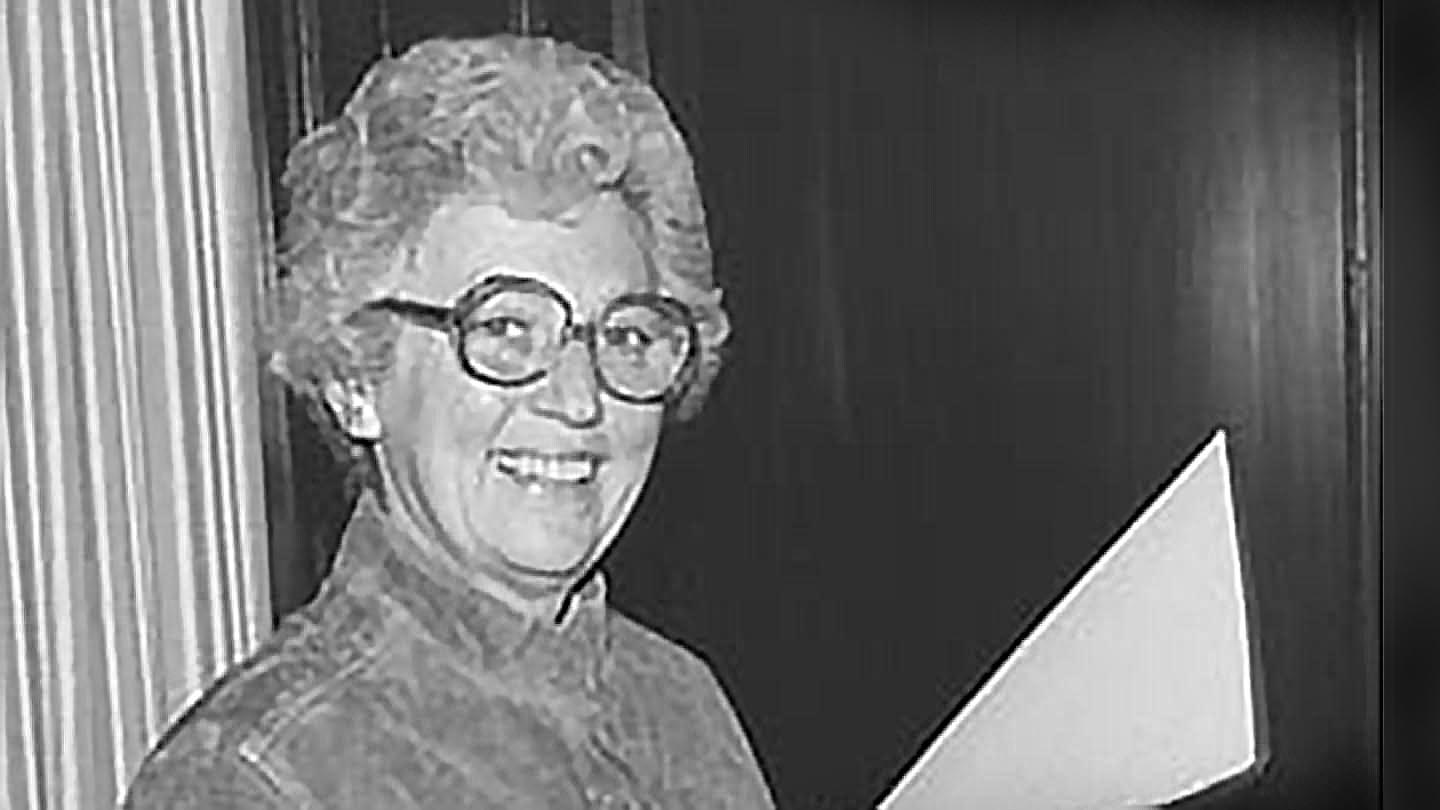

Member of the Pennsylvania Senate from the 18th district
- In office January 7, 1969 – November 30, 1994
- Preceded by: Justin Jirolanio
- Succeeded by: Joseph Uliana

Member of the Pennsylvania House of Representatives from the Northampton County district
- In office January 5, 1955 – November 30, 1966

Personal details
- Born: Jeanette Lillian Fichman; August 18, 1915 Fort Wayne, Indiana, U.S.
- Died: March 11, 2006 (aged 90) Allentown, Pennsylvania, U.S.
- Spouse: Nathan L. Reibman (m. 1943)

Jeanette F. Reibman (August 18, 1915 – March 11, 2006) was an American lawyer and politician who served as a Democratic member of the Pennsylvania State Senate for the 18th district from 1969 to 1994. She also served in the Pennsylvania House of Representatives for the Northampton County district from 1955 to 1966.

She was described by The Morning Call newspaper of Allentown, Pennsylvania prior to the 1954 elections as "the first woman ever to seek political office in [Northampton] county" and as the "First Northampton County Woman to Win Assembly Seat" in its post-election headlines, and was also one of only two women (along with Lisa Boscola) to have been elected to the Senate for Lehigh and Northampton counties as of 2015.

== Early years and education ==
Born as Jeanette Lillian Fichman in Fort Wayne, Indiana on August 18, 1915, to Meir and Pearl Schwartz Fichman, Jeanette Fichman graduated from North Side High School, and earned her Bachelor of Arts degree in Political Science with minors in English and Economics at Hunter College in 1937.

Fichman was then awarded a Legum Baccalaureus (Bachelor of Laws) degree by Indiana University School of Law-Bloomington, Indiana in 1940 and was subsequently admitted to the bar. In 1969, she was awarded a Doctor of Laws degree (L.L.D.) by Lafayette College.

== Career ==
She worked in Washington, D.C. as an attorney for the tax division of the United States War Department from 1940 to 1942 and the U.S. War Production Board from 1944 to 1946. After marrying attorney Nathan L. Reibman in 1943, she relocated with him to the Easton, Pennsylvania area to raise a family.

During the early to mid-1950s, she was a member of the bars of the Supreme Court of the United States, the U.S. Federal Court for the Eastern District of Pennsylvania and the United States Tax Court.

In 1954, the American Association of University Women recommended she run for to the Easton Area School Board and she was elected. She soon realized that she could do more to help with Easton schools at the state level.

Reibman served as member of the Pennsylvania House of Representatives for the Northampton County district from 1958 to 1966. She served as a member of the Pennsylvania State Senate for the 18th district from 1969 to 1996.

Reibman also served as a trustee for Lafayette College from 1970 to 1985.

Inducted into the Indiana University Maurer School of Law Academy of Alumni Fellows in 1993, Reibman retired from her elected position with the Pennsylvania Senate in 1994, after having been reelected seven times. She received honorary degrees from Lehigh University, Wilson College, Cedar Crest College, and Moravian College.

== Death and interment ==
Reibman died in Allentown, Pennsylvania on March 11, 2006.

== Legacy ==
An administration building on the campus of East Stroudsburg University was named in her honor in 1972. An early childhood learning center on the campus of Northampton Community College was then named in her honor in 1992.
