= Gus P. Verona =

American politician

Gus Paul Verona

Member of the Pennsylvania Senate from the 18th district
- In office 1963–1964
- Preceded by: Fred B. Rooney
- Succeeded by: Justin D. Jirolanio

Member of the Pennsylvania House of Representatives from the Northampton district
- In office 1959–1963
- Preceded by: Francis William Bucchin
- Succeeded by: Elmer J. Geiss

Personal details
- Born: March 16, 1910 Pen Argyl, Pennsylvania
- Died: August 8, 1964 (aged 54) Bangor, Pennsylvania
- Party: Democratic
- Education: Muhlenberg College

Gus Paul Verona was an American politician who represented the Lehigh Valley as a Democrat for six years from 1959 until his death in 1964, serving in both the Pennsylvania House of Representatives and the Pennsylvania State Senate.

== Early life ==
Gus P. Verona was born to Paul Verona and Catherine Née Cesare on March 16, 1910. A Pen Argyl native, he attended the Pen Argyl Area High School before studying at Muhlenberg College. He worked as a bobbin boy for the Pen Argyl Silk Mill and eventually rose to become the President of Slate Belt Apparel. Verona was also a member of the Delaware River Joint Toll Bridge Commission and manager of the John Hancock Mutual Life Insurance Company.

== Political career ==
Verona served as a member of the Democratic State Committee for six years, and then 20 years as the area chairman of the Democratic Party in Lehigh Valley. In 1959 he was elected to the Pennsylvania House of Representatives to represent Northampton County. He would resign following his election to the State Senate in 1963. His term was cut short following his sudden death, and Justin D. Jirolanio succeeded him following a special election.

== Personal life ==
Verona is interred in Saint Elizabeth's Cemetery in Pen Argyl. He was a lifelong Catholic. He served as the finance chairman for the Slate Belt Salvation Army, was president of the Easton Association of Life Underwriters, served on the finance committee for his local boy scouts troop, a member of the Lions Clubs International, and president of the Hillside, Rod and Gun Club.
