= Pennsylvania's 18th Senate district =

American legislative district

Pennsylvania's 18th State Senate district
Senator
Lisa Boscola; D–Bethlehem Township
- Population (2021): 263,814

Pennsylvania State Senate District 18 includes parts of Lehigh and Northampton counties in the Lehigh Valley region of eastern Pennsylvania. It is currently represented by Democrat Lisa Boscola.

== District profile ==
=== Historic composition ===
- 1st, 1801-1808, Mercer, Venango, Crawford, Erie, and Warren counties
- 2nd, 1809-1822, Washington and Greene counties
- 3rd, 1827-1843, Westmoreland County
- 4th, 1843-1845, Washington and Fayette counties
- 5th, 1845-1851, Adams and Franklin counties
- 6th, 1851-1853, Clarion, Tioga, Clearfield, McKean, Potter and Warren counties
- 7th, 1853-1855, Clearfield, Tioga, McKean, Potter and Jefferson counties
- 8th, 1857-1859, Tioga, Clearfield, McKean, Potter, and Jefferson counties
- 9th, 1859-1860, Adams, Franklin, and Fulton counties
- 10th, 1861-1862, Adams, Franklin, Fulton, and Philadelphia counties
- 11th, 1862-1865, Adams, Franklin, Fulton, and York counties
- 12th, 1865-1867, Cumberland, Mifflin, Juniata, Perry, and York counties
- 13th, 1867-1869, Mercer, Venango, and Warren counties
- 14th, 1869-1871, Cumberland and York counties
- 15th, 1872-1874, Blair, Cambria, Cameron, Clarion, Clearfield, Clinton, and Elk counties
- 16th, 1875-1969, Northampton County
- 17th, 1969-1995, Northampton, Monroe, and Lehigh counties
- 18th, 1995-1999, Northampton and Monroe counties
- 19th, 1999–Present, Northampton and Lehigh counties

=== Current composition ===
Since 1999 the district consists of the following areas:

Lehigh County

- Bethlehem (Lehigh County portion)

Northampton County

- Bangor
- Bethlehem (Northampton County portion)
- Bethlehem Township
- Easton
- East Bangor
- Forks Township
- Freemansburg
- Glendon
- Hellertown
- Lower Mount Bethel Township
- Lower Nazareth Township
- Lower Saucon Township
- Nazareth
- Palmer Township
- Pen Argyl
- Plainfield Township
- Portland
- Roseto
- Stockertown
- Tatamy
- Upper Mount Bethel Township
- Upper Nazareth Township
- Washington Township
- West Easton
- Williams Township
- Wilson
- Wind Gap

== Senators ==
Representative	Party	Years	District home	Note
The original 18th District was created in 1801 and consisted of Mercer, Venango, Crawford, Erie, and Warren counties
William McArthur Sr.	Democratic-Republican	1801 – 1808	Meadville	Laid out the town of Meadville.
The 18th District was redistricted in 1809 to represent Washington and Greene counties
James Stevenson	Democratic-Republican	1808 – 1810	Cross Creek	Born in Frederick County, Virginia, Pennsylvania State Representative from 1806-1807 and 1814-1816.
Isaac Weaver Jr.	Democratic-Republican	1809 – 1812	Waynesburg	Pennsylvania State Representative from 1797 to 1803 including as Speaker from 1800 to 1803. Treasurer of Pennsylvania from 1802 to 1807. First term as Pennsylvania State Senator.
Abel McFarland	Democratic-Republican	1811 – 1818	Amity	Originally from New Jersey, he settled in Washington County, Pennsylvania with his parents as a child.
Isaac Weaver Jr.	Democratic-Republican	1817 – 1820	Waynesburg	Pennsylvania State Representative from 1797 to 1803 including as Speaker from 1800 to 1803. Treasurer of Pennsylvania from 1802 to 1807. Second term as Pennsylvania State Senator.
Rees Hill	Democratic-Republican	1821 – 1822	Waynesburg	Pennsylvania State Representative from 1810 to 1813 and 1814 to 1820 including as Speaker in 1816 and 1819. Pennsylvania State Senator for the 20th district from 1823 to 1824
The original 18th District ceased to exist in 1822. A 2nd 18th District to represent Westmoreland County would be created in 1827
Jacob M. Wise	Democratic	1827 – 1830	Greensburg	Prominent early democrat from Western Pennsylvanian. Part of the committee that first nominated Jackson for president on December 23, 1823.
John Klingensmith Jr.	Democratic	1831 – 1834	West Newton	U.S. Representative for Pennsylvania's 19th congressional district from 1835 to 1839
Samuel Leas Carpenter	Democratic	1835 – 1837	Greensburg	Son of Judge Daniel Leas Carpenter. Also represented district 16 following redistricting from 1837 to 1839.
William F. Coplan	Jackson Democrat	1837 – 1842	Uniontown	Former Cumberland Road Commissioner
James Xavier McLanahan	Democratic	1843 – 1844	Chambersburg	Pennsylvania State Senator for the 14th district from 1841 to 1842. U.S. Representative for Pennsylvania's 16th congressional district from 1849 to 1853. Chair of the House Judiciary Committee from 1851 to 1853.
The 18th District would be redistricted in 1843 to represent Fayette and Greene counties
Charles Alexander Black	Democratic	1843 – 1844	Waynesburg	Pennsylvania State Senator for the 22nd district from 1845 to 1848
The 18th District would be redistricted in 1845 to represent Adams and Franklin counties
Thomas Erskine Carson	Whig	1845 – 1848	Mercersburg	Pennsylvania State Senator for the 11th district from 1851 to 1854
William Richard Sadler	Whig	1847 – 1850	York Springs	County auditor in Huntington Township, killed at the Battle of South Mountain.
The 18th District would be redistricted in 1851 to represent Clarion, Tioga, Clearfield, McKean, Potter and Warren counties
Timothy Ives	Democratic	1851 – 1852	Coudersport	Pennsylvania State Senator for the 28th district from 1849 to 1850
The 18th District would be redistricted in 1853 to represent Tioga, Clearfield, McKean, Potter and Forest counties
Byron Delano Hamlin	Democratic	1853 – 1855		
The 18th District would be redistricted in 1857 to represent Tioga, Clearfield, McKean, Potter and Jefferson counties
Henry Souther	Republican	1857 – 1858	Ridgway	Surveyor General of Pennsylvania in 1861.
The 18th District would be redistricted in 1859 to represent Adams, Franklin, and Fulton counties
George W. Brewer	Democratic	1859 – 1860	Chambersburg	Pennsylvania State Senator for the 11th district from 1857 to 1858
The 18th District would be redistricted in 1861 to represent Adams, Franklin, Fulton, and Philadelphia counties
Alexander Kelly McClure	Republican	1861 – 1862	Chambersburg	Pennsylvania State Representative from 1858 to 1859 and 1865 to 1866. Also represented the 4th district from 1873 to 1874. Personally met with Robert E. Lee when he occupied Chambersburg.
The 18th District would be redistricted in 1862 to represent Adams, Franklin, Fulton, and York counties
William McSherry	Democratic	1863 – 1864	Littlestown	Pennsylvania State Senator for the 19th district from 1865 to 1866 and the 20th district from 1873 to 1874
The 18th District would be redistricted in 1865 to represent Cumberland, Mifflin, Juniata, Perry, and York counties
George Hough Bucher	Democratic	1865 – 1866	Mechanicsburg	Pennsylvania State Senator for the 14th district from 1863 to 1864
The 18th District would be redistricted in 1867 to represent Mercer, Venango, and Warren counties
James C. Brown	Republican	1867 – 1868	Greenville	Civil War veteran, former State Representative, and unsuccessfully ran for United States Congress in 1890.
The 18th District would be redistricted in 1869 to represent Cumberland and York counties
Andrew G. Miller	Democratic	1869 – 1871	Shippensburg	Local blacksmith and amputee, father of State Senator William Edward Miller.
The 18th District would be redistricted in 1871 to represent Blair, Cambria, Cameron, Clarion, Clearfield, Clinton, and Elk counties
William A. Wallace	Democratic	1872 – 1874	Huntingdon	Pennsylvania Democratic Chair, United States Senator from Pennsylvania 1875 to 1881, unsuccessful candidate for governor in 1886 and 1890.
The 18th District would be redistricted in 1875 to represent Northampton County
Samuel C. Shimer	Independent Democrat	1875 – 1876	Bethlehem	Son of Conrad Schilp Shimer, local farmer, Pennsylvania State Representative from 1864 to 1865.
David Engleman	Democratic	1877 – 1878	Bath	Local doctor, Pennsylvania State Representative from 1870 to 1871, member of the Pennsylvania State Board of Health.
William Beidelman	Democratic	1879 – 1882	Easton	2nd Mayor of Easton, Civil War Veteran.
Jeremiah S. Hess	Democratic	1883 – 1886	Hellertown	Chief Burgess and town councilor of Hellertown.
Jacob Dachrodt	Democratic	1887 – 1890	Easton	Civil war hero and Easton City Councilor.
Edward Henry Laubach	Democratic	1891 – 1896	Northampton	President of the Northampton Brewing Company, first Senator to win re-election
Henry D. Heller	Republican	1895 – 1898	Hellertown	Local Doctor, later named State Quarantine Physician by Governor William A. Stone
Jacob B. Kemerer	Democratic	1899 – 1902	Bethlehem	Chief Burgess of Bethlehem from 1887 to 1893. Died in office from Bright's disease.
Thomas D. Danner	Democratic	1903 – 1906	Easton	Northampton County Democratic Committee Chairman from 1901 to 1904.
Benjamin Franklin Miller	Democratic	1907 – 1910	Bangor	Pennsylvania State Representative for the Northampton County district from 1899 to 1902.
Harry J. Morgan	Democratic	1911 – 1914	Bethlehem	Former clerk of the Court of Quarter Sessions of Northampton County from 1903 to 1910.
William Clayton Hackett	Democratic	1915 – 1922	Easton	Son of Joseph Marion Hackett, unsuccessful candidate for Lieutenant Governor in 1926.
Harry D. Kutz	Democratic	1923 – 1926	Easton	Lawyer associated with the National Security League.
Warren R. Roberts	Democratic	1927 – 1936	Freemansburg	Pennsylvania Auditor General from 1937 to 1941.
William G. Barthold	Democratic	1937 – 1938	Bethlehem	Northampton County judge for 31 years, 21 as President Judge.
Charles A.P. Bartlett	Republican	1939 – 1942	Wilson	World War I Army captain, Pennsylvania Senate Librarian from 1943 to 1948.
Carleton T. Woodring	Democratic	1943 – 1948	Easton	Pennsylvania State Representative from 1940 to 1942, Northampton County judge for 33 years, 19 as President Judge.
Joseph J. Yosko	Democratic	1949 – 1958	Bethlehem	Worked in various state department offices, State President of the Young Democrats of America
Fred B. Rooney	Democratic	1959 – 1964	Bethlehem	U.S. Representative for Pennsylvania's 15th congressional district from 1963 to 1979
Gus P. Verona	Democratic	1963 – 1964	Bangor	Former Bobbin boy, Chairman of the Lehigh Valley Democratic Committee for 20 years
Justin D. Jirolanio	Democratic	1963 – 1968	Fountain Hill	Pennsylvania State Representative for the Northampton County district from 1936 to 1940
The 18th District would be redistricted in 1969 to include portions of Lehigh and Monroe counties
Jeanette F. Reibman	Democratic	1969 – 1994	Easton	Pennsylvania State Representative for the Northampton County district from 1955 to 1966
The 18th District would be redistricted in 1995 removing the Lehigh County portion of the district
Joseph M. Uliana	Republican	1995 – 1998	Bethlehem	Pennsylvania State Representative for the 135th district from 1991 to 1994
The 18th District would be redistricted in 1999 returning the Lehigh County portion of the district and removing the Monroe county portion
Lisa Boscola	Democratic	1999 – present	Bethlehem Township	Pennsylvania State Representative for the 135th district from 1995 to 1998
