= Carleton T. Woodring =

American politician

The Honorable Carleton T. Woodring J.D.

Northampton County Senior Judge
- In office 1967–1980

President Judge of the Northampton County Court
- In office 1948–1967

Member of the Pennsylvania Senate from the 18th district
- In office 1943–1948
- Preceded by: Charles A.P. Bartlett
- Succeeded by: Joseph J. Yosko

Member of the Pennsylvania House of Representatives for Northampton County
- In office 1940–1942

Personal details
- Born: September 5, 1902 Easton, Pennsylvania
- Died: September 23, 1992 (aged 90) St. Luke's hospital Bethlehem, Pennsylvania
- Party: Democratic
- Spouse: Margaret Bixler
- Children: 3
- Education: Pennsylvania State University B.S. University of Pennsylvania J.D.
- Occupation: Lawyer; Judge

Carleton T. Woodring was an American politician who represented the Lehigh Valley in the Pennsylvania State Senate for the 18th district as a Democrat from 1943 until 1948 when he resigned to run for Northampton County Judge, an office he would hold for 33 years from 1948 to 1981.

== Early life ==
Carleton T. Woodring was born to Joseph G. Woodring and Elizabeth R. Née Transue on September 5, 1902, in Easton, Pennsylvania. He graduated from Pennsylvania State University with a bachelor's degree in Forestry as part of their class of 1923. He worked for the Crossett Lumber Co. in Arkansas for three years before returning to Pennsylvania and attending the University of Pennsylvania earning a Juris Doctor degree in 1930. He worked for a number of years as a traveling salesman for his father's hat company before being admitted to the Northampton Bar. He would also be admitted to the Bar of the Pennsylvania Supreme and Superior courts and Federal courts, including the Supreme Court of the United States.

== Career ==
Woodring operated a law firm for 17 years before he ran for election to the Pennsylvania House of Representatives as a Democrat to represent Northampton County. He won the election, but would not seek re-election, and served from 1940 to 1942. He would run for State Senate in 1942 and would represent the 18th district for two terms from 1943 to 1948. He decided to not seek a third term and instead run for President Judge of the Northampton County Court. Traditionally, it was an unspoken rule that as a pre-requesite for this office one would have to be the Northampton county District attorney. Woodring broke this precedent saying “I was told you had to be a district attorney first to become a judge, but I didn’t want to be DA.” As President judge he was pivotal in establishing a Alcoholics Anonymous in the county jail, and regularly attending meetings with the inmates and testified in favor of several of them. In 1967, at the age of 65, he decided to not seek re-election as president judge, but continued to serve as a senior judge for another 13 years until 1980 until he retired at the age of 78.

== Personal life ==
Woodring was a member of the First Presbyterian church in Easton, but was a Lutheran, serving on the executive committee of the Pennsylvania Ministerium. He was a delegate to the United Lutheran Church in America for 1952 to 58 and was their secretary of the board of American Missions.

He was a trustee of Muhlenberg College, director of Family Services Inc., was a member of The Salvation Army, and the president of the Easton Exchange Club. Woodring was a delegate to the Pennsylvania Constitutional Convention of 1968 as co-chairman of the committees of finance and taxation. He was a director of the Lehigh Northampton Airport Authority for 19 years, president of the Bach Choir of Bethlehem and chairman of the board of the Lehigh Valley Blue Cross.

Woodring married Margaret Née Bixler and the couple had one daughter, Sally Woodring, and two sons, Carleton T. Woodring Jr. and M. Douglas Woodring. He lived in Easton for 89 years, moving to the Moravian Hall Square Retirement Center in Nazareth in the last year of his life. He suffered a fall in his home on Monday September 21, 1992, and was rushed to St. Luke's University Health Network in Bethlehem, Pennsylvania, where he died two days later on Wednesday September 23, 1992, from his sustained injuries.
