= Justin D. Jirolanio =

American politician

Chairman of the Northampton County Democratic Party
- In office 1972–1980

Member of the Pennsylvania Senate from the 18th district
- In office 1963–1968
- Preceded by: Gus P. Verona
- Succeeded by: Jeanette Reibman

Chairman of the Bethlehem Democratic City Committee
- In office 1963–1972

Assistant District Attorney of Northampton County
- In office 1940–1944

Member of the Pennsylvania House of Representatives
- In office 1936–1940

Personal details
- Born: May 5, 1904 New York City, New York, U.S.
- Died: October 25, 1984 (aged 80) Bethlehem, Pennsylvania, U.S.
- Party: Democratic
- Education: Franklin and Marshall College (B.S.)
- Occupation: Lawyer

Justin D. Jirolanio was an American politician who acted as the political boss of the Lehigh Valley's Democratic Party, serving in both chambers of the Pennsylvania General Assembly and holding various local offices.

== Early life and education ==
Jirolanio was born on May 5, 1904, in New York City to Joseph Jirolanio and Philomena Née Dallesandro. He attended the Bethlehem High School, which is now Liberty High School, in Bethlehem, before transferring to the Perkiomen School, where he graduated in 1923. During high school, he worked as a laborer and helped construct the Hill-to-Hill Bridge.

He attended Franklin and Marshall College, where he graduated with a Bachelor of Science in 1929. He then attended the Temple University Beasley School of Law dropped out during the Great Depression. Jirolanio originally worked as an apprentice mechanic, machinist, and silk weaver for the Bethlehem Steel Company before opening a law office in 1934.

== Career ==
Jirolanio was elected to the Pennsylvania House of Representatives as a Democrat in 1936. He was sworn in on December 1, 1936, and served until 1940. During his time in the Pennsylvania State House, he was a member of the committee to investigate the Bureau of Aeronautics. He then served as the Assistant District Attorney of Northampton County from 1940 to 1944. He unsuccessfully campaigned for District Attorney three different times, in 1943, in 1951, and in 1955. In 1963, he was elected chairman of the Bethlehem Democratic City Committee from 1963, where he served until 1972.

In 1963, following the death of Pennsylvania State Senator Gus P. Verona, Jirolanio was elected in a special election to the Pennsylvania Senate to represent Pennsylvania's 18th Senate District and served until 1968. He served as a delegate to Pennsylvania's Constitutional Convention in 1967 and 1968, and he served as the Chairman of the Northampton County Democratic Party from 1972 to 1980.

== Personal life ==
Jirolanio was a member of the United Church of Christ. He married Dorothy E. Née Fawber with whom he had a daughter, Harrison W. Wright. He had a brother, Achille Jirolanio, and three sisters: Edith Sebastian, Beatrice Cellec, and Mary Kovach.

== Death ==
Jirolanio died at the St. Luke's University Health Network on October 25, 1984, aged 80. He was buried at the Memorial Park Cemetery in Bethlehem, Pennsylvania.
