= Joseph J. Yosko =

American politician

Member of the Pennsylvania Senate from the 18th district
- In office 1949–1958
- Preceded by: Carleton T. Woodring
- Succeeded by: Fred B. Rooney

Hearing Examiner Pennsylvania Department of Revenue
- In office 1934–1936

Administrative Director Pennsylvania Auditor General
- In office 1936–1940

Director of Public Assistance and Unemployment Compensation Bureau of Disbursements Pennsylvania Treasurer
- In office 1940–1944

Executive Director Pennsylvania Auditor General
- In office 1944–1948

President Young Democrats of America Pennsylvania Chapter
- In office 1940–1942

Personal details
- Born: November 1, 1903 Jeanesville, Pennsylvania
- Died: September 19, 1958 (aged 54) Bethlehem, Pennsylvania
- Party: Democratic
- Spouse: Gertrude Reynolds
- Education: Moravian College; National University School of Law

Joseph J. Yosko was an American politician who represented the Lehigh Valley in the Pennsylvania State Senate for the 18th district as a Democrat from 1949 until his death in 1958. He also served in numerous departmental offices starting in 1934.

== Early life ==
Yosko was born in Jeanesville, Pennsylvania on November 1, 1903, to Michael and Mary Yosko. While he was still a child his family moved to Bethlehem, Pennsylvania and Yosko attended a Parochial school. He served a four-year Apprenticeship to become a machinist at the Bethlehem Steel corporation. He then returned to school and got his high school diploma from Bethlehem High school and attended Moravian College. Then he attended Penn State Dickinson Law before transferring to National University School of Law where he earned his Legum Doctor.

== Career ==
Upon completing his law degree he worked as a clerk for Northampton County District Attorney's office and worked for the Home Owners' Loan Corporation. He then worked as State Senator Warren R. Roberts' secretary, introducing him to his political career. He worked as the Hearing Examiner for the Pennsylvania Department of Revenue from 1934 to 1936. He then served as the administrative director for the Pennsylvania Auditor General from 1936 to 1940. He then served as Director of Public Assistance and Unemployment Compensation for the Bureau of Disbursements for the Pennsylvania Treasurer from 1940 to 1944. Returning to the Auditor General's office, he served as executive director from 1944 to 1948. He was the state president for the Young Democrats of America from 1940 to 1942. Yosko served as the state chairman for the Democratic Registration Campaign Committee in 1947, was the District Vice-chair Democratic State Committee, Executive Director Democratic Society of Pennsylvania and the Chairman of the Bethlehem Democratic committee. He also served as Secretary of the Association of State Auditors, Comptrollers, and Treasurers. Yosko would be elected to the State Senate in 1949 and served for 9 years and 10 months until his death on September 19, 1958. His vacancy would be filled by Fred B. Rooney following a special election.

== Personal life ==
Yosko spoke at the 1952 commencement for Bethlehem Catholic High School awarding the award for proficiency In stenography to Jean M. Puraell. Yosko married Gertrude Née Reynolds.
