= Thomas Erskine Carson =

American politician from Pennsylvania

Speaker of the Pennsylvania Senate
- In office 1853–1853
- Preceded by: Christian Myers
- Succeeded by: Byron Delano Hamlin

Member of the Pennsylvania Senate from the 11th district
- In office 1851–1853
- Preceded by: Gordon Fowler Mason
- Succeeded by: John Wallace Guernsey

Member of the Pennsylvania Senate from the 18th district
- In office 1845–1847
- Preceded by: Charles Alexander Black
- Succeeded by: William Richard Sadler

Member of the Pennsylvania House of Representatives from Franklin County
- In office 1844–1843
- In office 1834–1835

Auditor of Franklin County
- In office 1824–1827

Personal details
- Born: August 6, 1791 Greencastle, Pennsylvania
- Died: April 26, 1857 (aged 65) Mercersburg, Pennsylvania
- Party: Whig
- Spouse: Agnes King Carson
- Children: 6
- Occupation: Teacher; Merchant

Thomas Erskine Carson (1791-1857) was an American politician from Mercersburg, Pennsylvania, who served intermittently in the Pennsylvania House of Representatives and the Pennsylvania Senate as a Whig from 1834 to 1853. During his last year in the State Senate, Carson was elected the Speaker of the Pennsylvania Senate.

== Biography ==
Thomas Erskine Carson was born to David and Jean Oliver Carson in Greencastle, Pennsylvania on August 6, 1791. As a child Carson excelled in English studies and became a teacher before working for a hat manufacturer and then as a merchant before moving to Mercersburg, Pennsylvania. There Carson became interested in politics, first being elected as auditor of Franklin County from 1824 to 1827, and then being elected as one of Mercersburg's magistrates.

Carson was elected to the Pennsylvania House of Representatives, serving there from 1834 to 1835, and again from 1843 to 1844. He was also elected to two terms to the Pennsylvania senate, first from 1845 to 1847 and again from 1851 to 1853. During his latter term, Carson was elected Speaker of the Pennsylvania Senate. Carson remained loyal to the Whig party, even through its decline in the 1850s, and was an ardent supporter of Henry Clay. Carson would be defeated during his re-election bid in the Whig primaries to William Richard Sadler.

Carson married Agnes King on March 23, 1815, the niece of Dr. John King, a local leading patriot during the American Revolution. The couple had six children including; Eliza Carson Jean who moved to a Allegheny City, Washington King Carson who moved to Baltimore to work at Thomas' brother James Carson's merchant outfit and was a noted early Republican orator and abolitionist to the point he had to flee the city during the Baltimore riot of 1861. Thomas King Carson and William King Carson who both moved to Ohio. As well as two daughters, Rosannah Carson Mary and Margret Carson Emeline who stayed in Mercersburg. Thomas Erskine Carson died on April 26, 1857, and is buried in Fairview Cemetery in Mercersburg.
