= Byron Delano Hamlin =

American politician

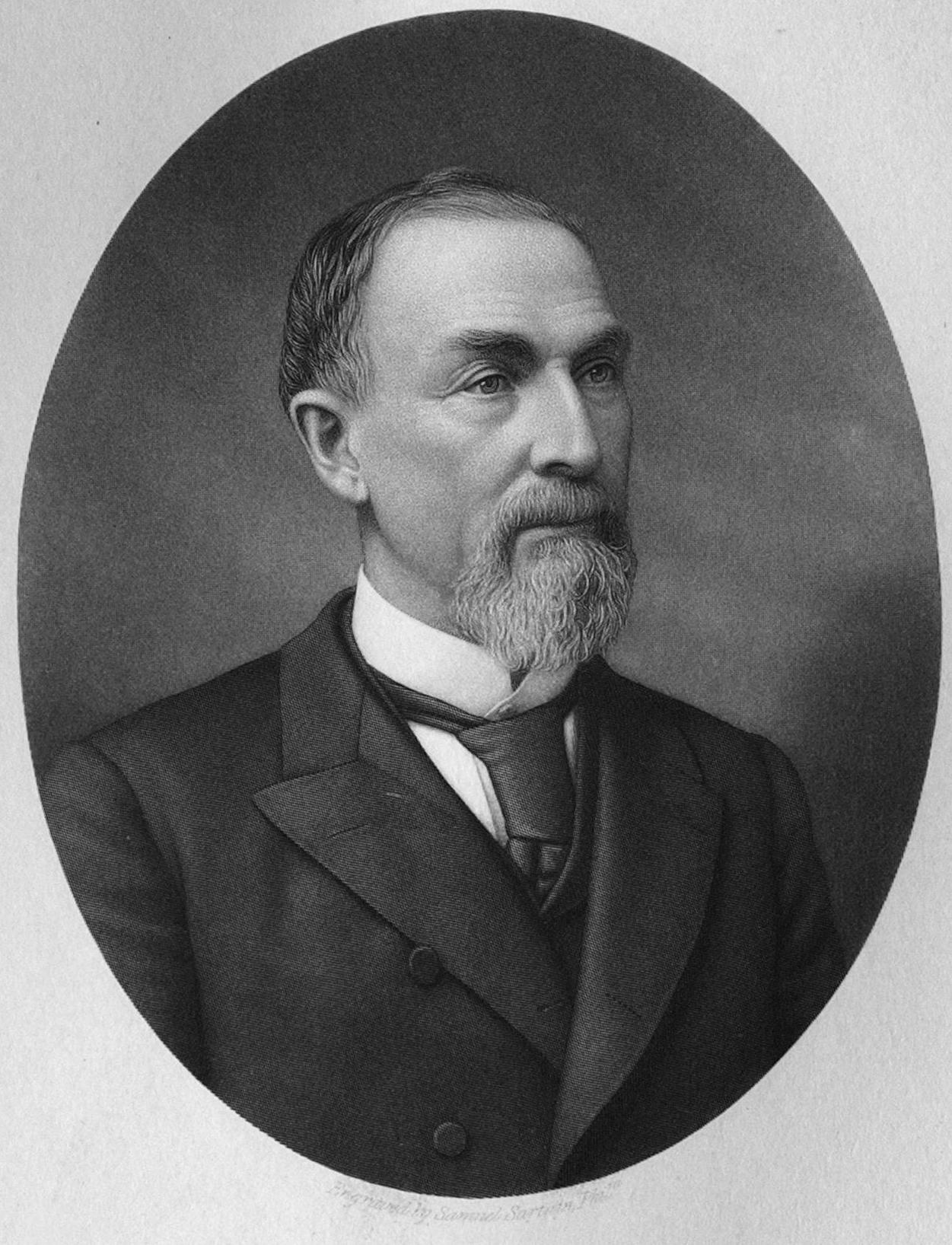
- Hamlin's Senate portrait

Member of the Pennsylvania Senate from the 18th district
- In office 1853–1855
- Preceded by: Timothy Ives
- Succeeded by: Henry Souther

Speaker of the Pennsylvania Senate
- In office 1854–1854
- Preceded by: John Christian Kunkel
- Succeeded by: William Muhlenberg Hiester

Personal details
- Born: May 7, 1824 Sheshequin, Bradford County, Pennsylvania
- Died: September 4, 1907 (age 83) Smethport McKean County, Pennsylvania
- Party: Democratic
- Spouse: Harriet née Holmes
- Children: 3
- Occupation: Lawyer
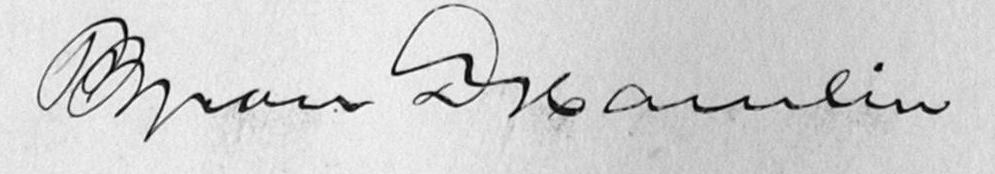
- Signature

Byron Delano Hamlin was an American politician from Pennsylvania who served in the Pennsylvania Senate as a member of the Democratic Party, representing the 18th district from 1853 to 1855.

== Biography ==
Hamlin was born on May 7, 1824 in Sheshequin in Bradford County to Dr Asa Hamlin and Asenath Delano. Byron was the youngest of seven children, and Asa Hamlin ran a strict puritan household, with little amusements. His sister Jenette married Moses Crow, a Reverend and professor at Allegheny College in Meadville, who invited Byron to attend school there. However, Moses and Jenette would die of Typhoid fever in 1843, with Byron's brother Orlo convincing him to drop out and start practicing law, and by 1846 he was named to the bar of McKean County. In June 1833 he moved to Smethport in McKean County where he would spend the rest of his life, initially working odd jobs including as a mailman while he attended Smethport Academy. In 1844 he married Harriet née Holmes.

In 1848 the McKean County Democratic party recommended Hamlin run for a seat in the State House, as he was involved in the party since he was a youth, but he refused. In 1853 he was elected to the Pennsylvania Senate as a Democrat and served as Speaker of the Pennsylvania Senate in 1854 before losing his re-election bid in 1855. In 1854 he was named to the board of the Bradford Hospital, and spent the rest of his life engaged in various business ventures and as a corporate attorney.

At the outbreak of the American Civil War Hamlin volunteered to join the Union Army but following his medical evaluation was deemed unfit for service. Instead he worked as a recruiter for the Bucktail Regiment during the duration of the war. In 1868 he was offered being named President Judge of the counties of Clearfield, Clinton, and Centre, but declined the post. In 1882 despite his initial protests, he ran on the Democratic ticket for the State House, however, would lose the election. (Note: At the time, elections to the State House where determined by lists of candidates approved by the county branches of parties. Voters would vote their party preference, and the party that got the most votes would have their list sworn in as the winners)

Hamlin died on September 4, 1907 at the age of 83, and is buried in the Rose Hill Cemetery in Smethport.

== Personal life ==
Hamlin had three children; Delano Richmond Hamlin, Jenette Hamlin Redfield, Mary Hamlin Forrest. Hamlin's house is a part of the Smethport Mansion District, a local historical district run by the borough.
