= Benjamin Franklin Miller =

American politician

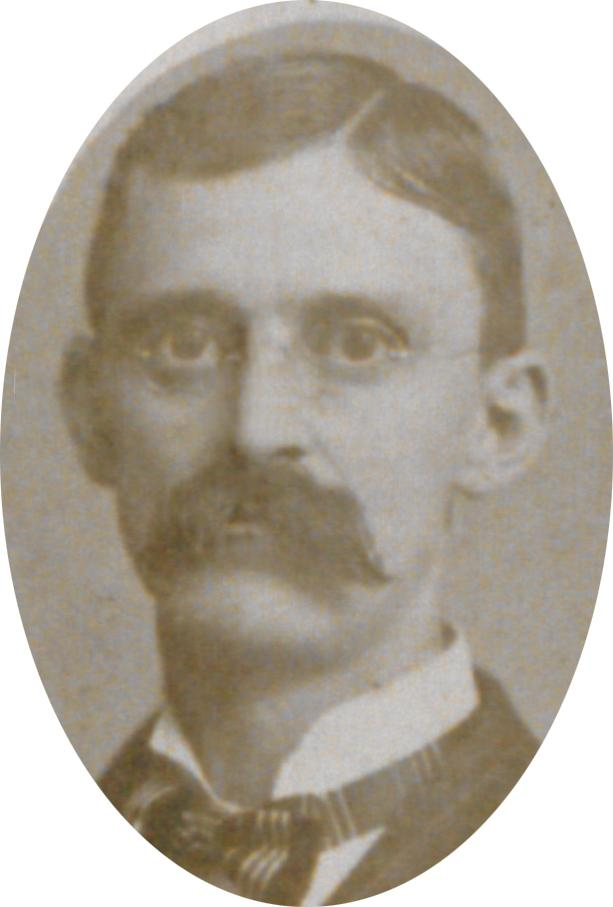

Member of the Pennsylvania Senate from the 18th district
- In office 1907–1910
- Preceded by: Thomas D. Danner
- Succeeded by: Harry Morgan

Borough councilor of Bangor, Pennsylvania
- In office 1905–1910

Member of the Pennsylvania House of Representatives from Northampton County
- In office 1899–1902

Chief burgess of Bangor, Pennsylvania
- In office 1896–1899

Washington Township School director
- In office 1883–1891

Personal details
- Born: March 14, 1858 Richmond, Upper Mount Bethel Township (today Washington Township)
- Died: February 11, 1947 (aged 88) Pen Argyl, Pennsylvania
- Party: Democratic
- Occupation: Merchant

Benjamin Franklin Miller (1858–1947) was an American politician from Pennsylvania who served in the Pennsylvania State Senate and the Pennsylvania House of Representatives as a Democrat

== Biography ==
Miller was born in Upper Mount Bethel Township, Northampton County on March 14, 1858, in the village of Richmond to Joseph B Miller and Leah Hillard Miller. Today Richmond is part of Washington Township.

He worked in the milling business for J.B. Miller & Son before being elected the school director for Washington Township from 1883 to 1891. Then he was elected chief burgess, an office akin to mayor, of Bangor, Pennsylvania from 1896 to 1899.

He was elected as a Democrat to the Pennsylvania House of Representatives in 1898 and 1900 and chose not to seek re-election in 1902.

He subsequently served on the Bangor borough council from 1905 to 1910 and was then elected to the Pennsylvania State Senate. After serving with that legislative body from 1907 to 1910, he retired from politics.

He then worked as president and director of Merchants’ National Bank and the Bangor Casket Company, as a receiver for the S. Floatey Manufacturing Company, and as director of the Bangor Steam Heat Company.

== Death and interment ==
Miller died on February 11, 1947, in Pen Argyl, Pennsylvania and was buried in St. John's Cemetery in Bangor.
