= William C. Rybak =

American politician

Member of the Pennsylvania House of Representatives from the 135th district
- In office 1981–1990
- Preceded by: J. Michael Schweder
- Succeeded by: Joseph Uliana
- In office 1969–1972
- Preceded by: District created
- Succeeded by: Thomas J. Maloney

Member of the Pennsylvania House of Representatives from the Northampton County district
- In office 1967–1968

Personal details
- Born: March 2, 1921 New York City, New York
- Died: February 3, 2004 (aged 82) Bethlehem, Pennsylvania
- Party: Democratic

William C. Rybak (March 2, 1921 – February 3, 2004) was a Democratic member of the Pennsylvania House of Representatives. He was a member from the Northampton County district (1967–1972) and from the 135th district (1981–1990).
