= Waynesburg and Washington Railroad =

Railway line in the United States of America

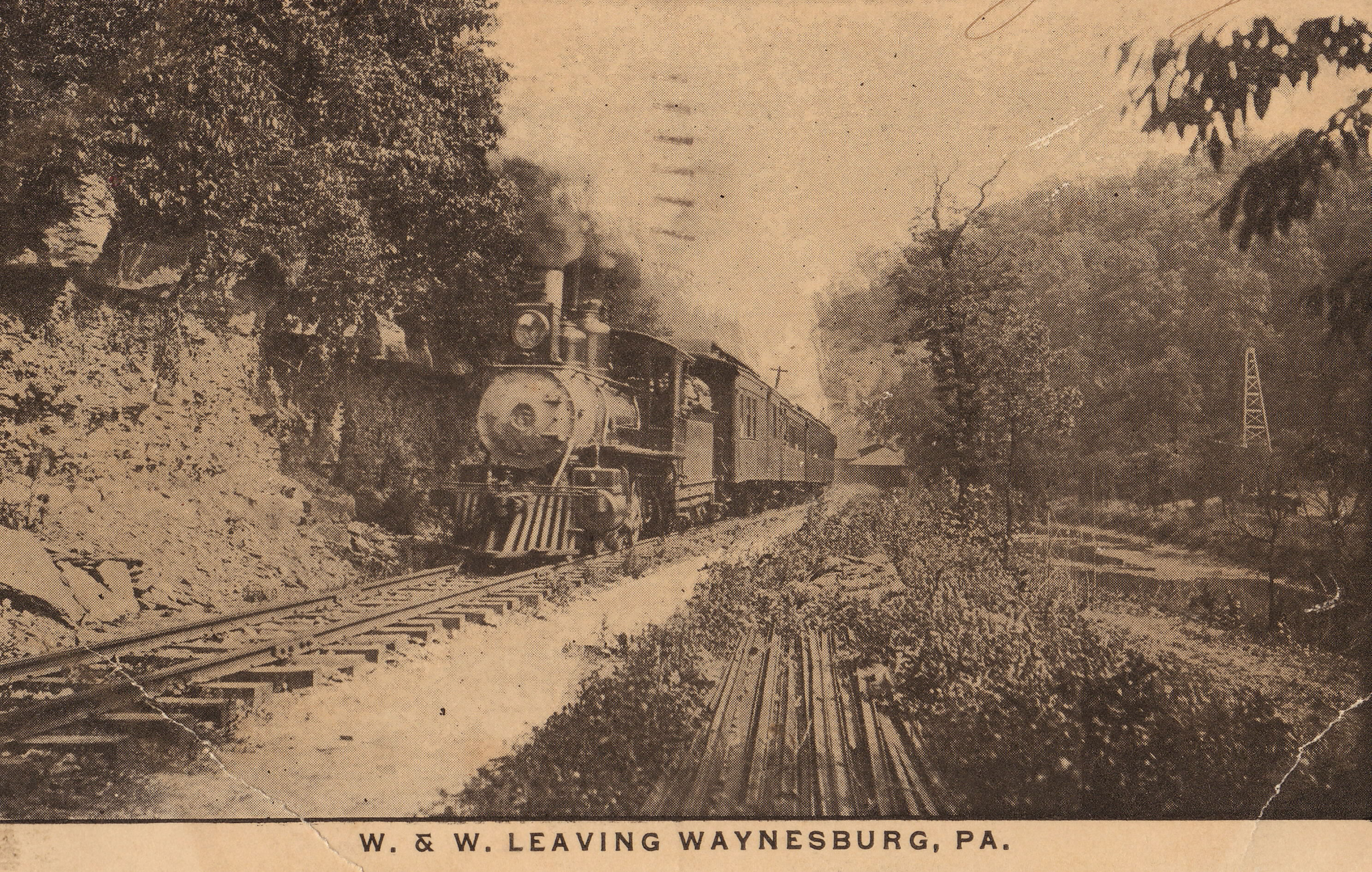

Overview
- Reporting mark: WAW
- Locale: Southwestern Pennsylvania, U.S.
- Dates of operation: 1868–1976

Technical
- Track gauge: 4 ft 8 1/2 in (1,435 mm) standard gauge
- Previous gauge: Originally 3 ft (914 mm) gauge

The Waynesburg and Washington Railroad was a twenty-eight-mile, three-foot gauge subsidiary of the Pennsylvania Railroad. It started because of the boom in oil and gas, helped all of the natural resource industries to grow and spurred an increase in population in Waynesburg, Pennsylvania. Coal was already being mined on the eastern end of the county near the river.

From the 1870s through the 1920s, this line (often referred to as the Wayynie) served its namesake towns in Southwestern Pennsylvania. After the 1930s, the line struggled on, mostly on paper. Today, all that remains from the railroad's heyday is one locomotive, a few stations and a few images.

== History ==
The Waynesburg and Washington Railroad ran between the county seats of Washington and Greene Counties. It was first conceived by John Day in 1874. The route of the railroad was determined by former State Senator Charles Alexander Black on January 25, 1875. The charter was signed later that year and work began in August. It was to be a three-foot narrow gauge line, because of the current inclination toward the building of those types of lines and because they were cheaper to build. The line ran independently until the Pennsylvania Railroad acquired it in 1885.

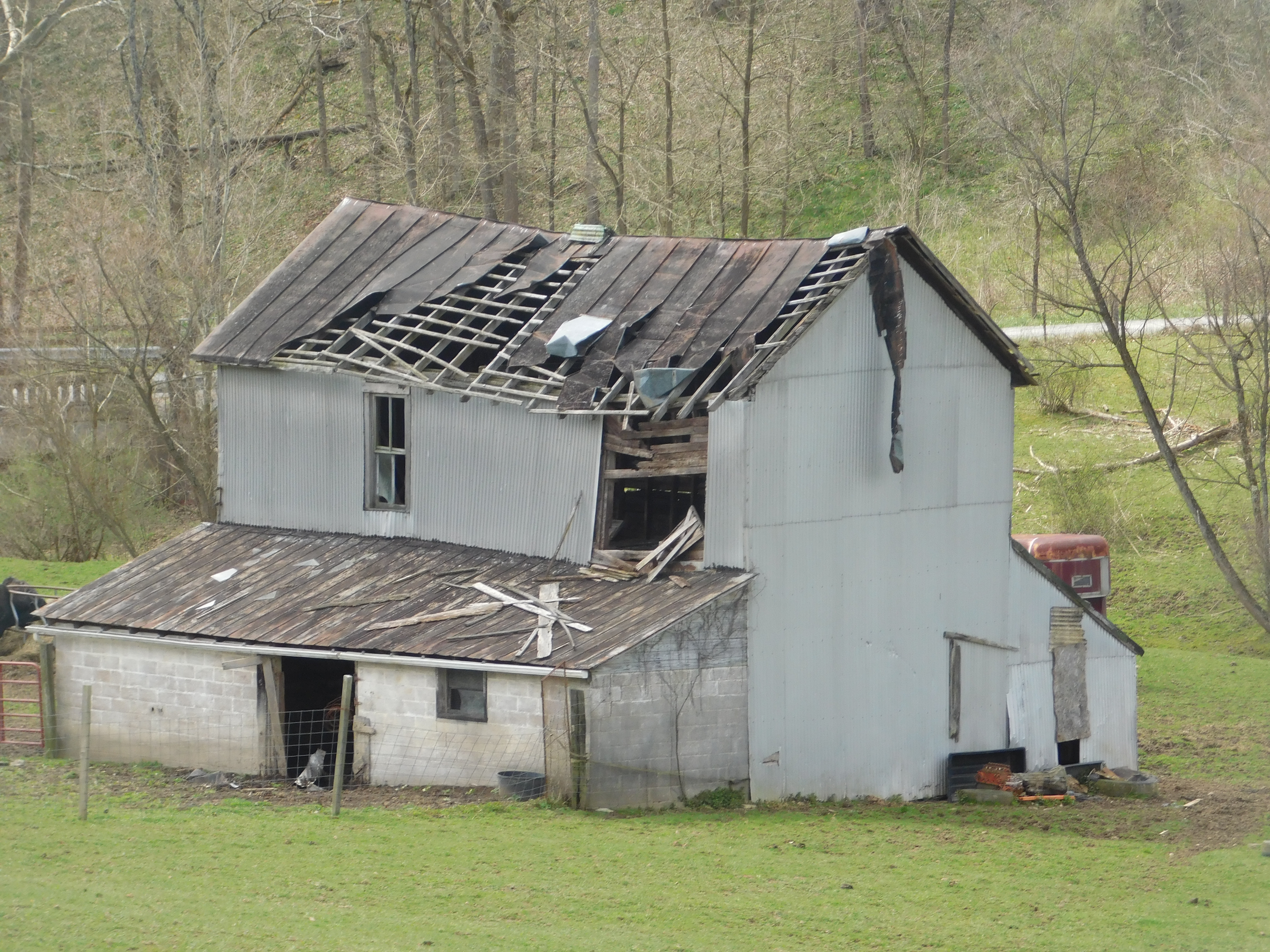
The former station depot at Iams in April 2022

The line had fallen by the wayside around the time of the Great Depression. The railroad suspended passenger service on July 9, 1929. There were rail truck services to the towns along the line until 1976, when the ownership passed to Conrail. The line is now used up for a portion as a rail link to a local coal mine. The other portions of the line are now abandoned. The line itself ran in crazy horseshoes and prompted many who rode the line to say that the "Waynie" had been designed by a snake. The line stretched out for twenty eight miles. Horseshoe Curve, named for the more famous one near Altoona, was an astounding 35 degrees, or 164 feet radius. The line rose from 900 feet above sea level at Waynesburg, the low point, to just above 1400 feet above sea level at Summit about four miles south of Washington. There were points where locomotives had a climb of 200 feet in less than two miles. This combination made for travel on the line quite grueling. Because of both of these facts, there were never any locomotives with greater than six driving wheels. There were Moguls on the line in later times, but these had to have the center drivers blind. This made for an interesting rolling stock and mainline.

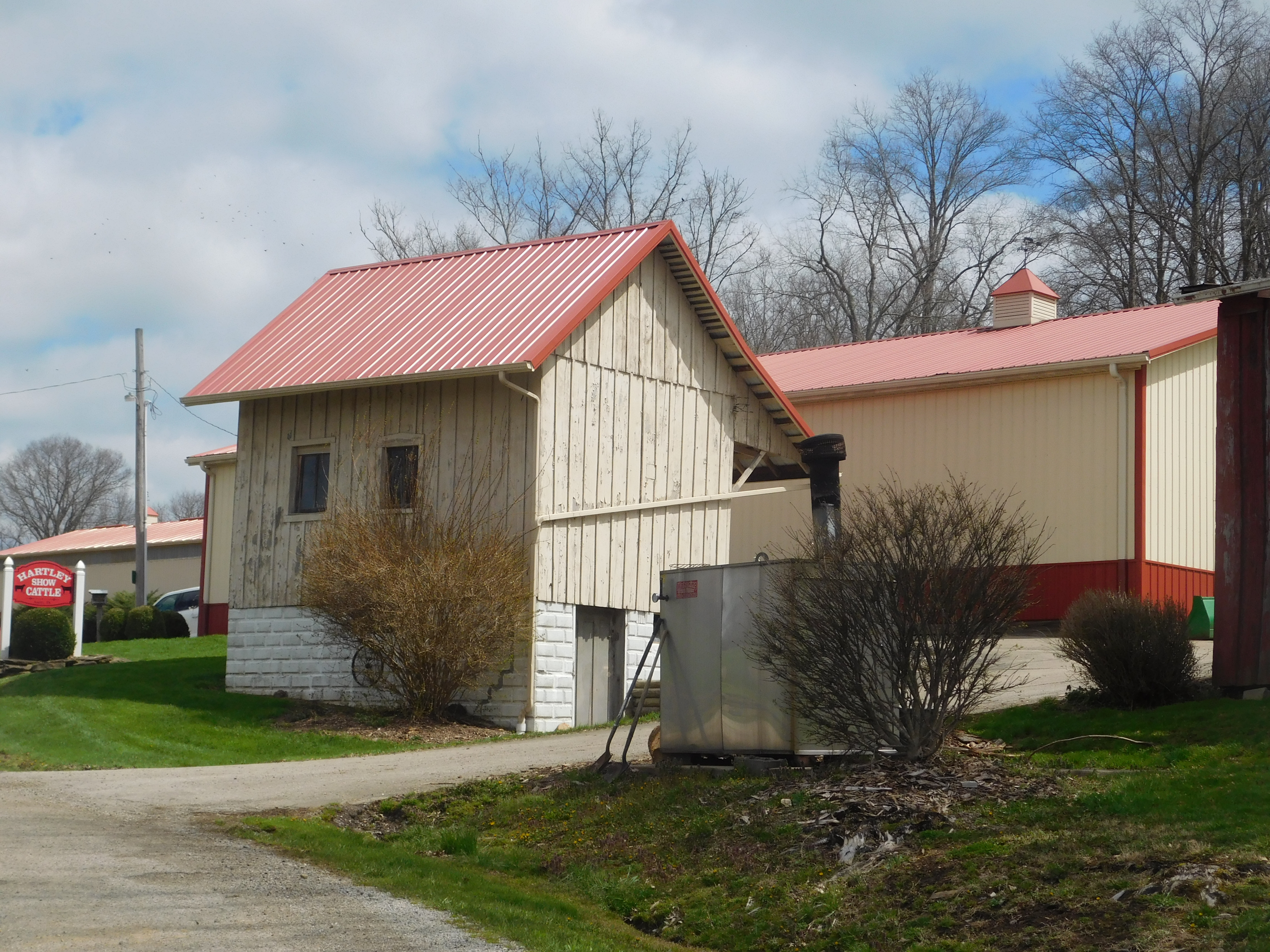
The former station depot at West Amity in April 2022

Waynesburg was the southern terminus. This was the main yard for the line and had a roundhouse, turntable, freight house, stockyard, all the associated yard structures for locomotives - and of course the station. The station was built in 1885 and the two track train shed was built in 1893. By 1904, the station had a long freight room, waiting room, ticket office, and the railroad's offices. The Downey House and the Walton House both had porters that met every train and shouted the name of their respective hotels. They toted luggage the several blocks uptown to the hotels.

When war broke, Company K would all pile into the coaches at the station to ride to Washington and then on to Pittsburgh. After the line started failing, the yard was torn up and the station was passed on to a local wool dealer and then to the county road department. The yard was completely gone by the 1980s, and the station was near collapse. In the late 1980s, the station was torn down; Conrail now has an office and a siding in this spot. In 2023 it was announced a surviving locomotive will be featured at the 44th National Narrow Gauge Convention. The locomotive is currently housed at the Greene County Historical Society and will be displayed at a museum in the 2024.
