= James C. Brown (Pennsylvania politician) =

American Civil War veteran and politician (1828–1892)

Member of the Pennsylvania Senate from the 18th district
- In office 1867–1868
- Preceded by: George Hough Bucher
- Succeeded by: Andrew G. Miller

Member of the Pennsylvania House of Representatives
- In office 1862–1863

Personal details
- Born: October 7, 1828 Greenville, Pennsylvania
- Died: February 12, 1892 (aged 63) Greenville, Pennsylvania
- Party: Republican
- Spouse: Mary Anna Née Bittenbender
- Children: 3
- Occupation: Journalist

Military service
- Years of service: 1863
- Rank: Private

James C. Brown (October 7, 1828 – February 12, 1892) was an American Civil War veteran from Greenville, Pennsylvania who was elected to the Pennsylvania House of Representatives and the Pennsylvania Senate both for a single term as a Republican.

== Biography ==
=== Before the Civil War ===
James C. Brown was born to James Wilson Brown and Jane King Brown on October 7, 1828, in Greenville, Pennsylvania. James C. Brown worked in many positions in the newspaper industry, first as a printer and writer for the Mercer County Whig and then as the editor of the Jefferson Star and as the proprietor and editor of the Independent Press. He was elected the superintendent of schools for Mercer County, serving a single term from 1854 to 1856, when he married his wife Mary Anna Née Bittenbender. The couple had three children, two daughters and a son. Brown was elected to the Pennsylvania House of Representatives, serving a single term from 1862 to 1863 when he unsuccessfully sought a seat in the Pennsylvania Senate.

=== After the Civil War ===
Brown would enlist as a Private in the Union Army during the American civil war, serving in Company C of the 55th regiment of the Pennsylvania Emergency Militia in 1863. After the war Brown again sought a seat in the Pennsylvania Senate, winning a term from 1867 to 1868. Upon leaving the senate Brown worked for the Internal Revenue Service, as the assessor (1871–1873), deputy collector (1873–1874), and collector (1874–1883) of Mercer and Crawford Counties. Concurrently, Brown was elected President of the Greenville school board from 1874 to 1879 and was the proprietor and editor of the Advance Argus from 1877 to 1890. Brown unsuccessfully sought a seat in the United States House of Representatives in the 1890 election before working as the proprietor and editor of the New Wilmington Globe. Brown was also elected a delegate-at-large for the 1892 Republican National Convention, but died before the convention on February 12, 1892, and is interred in the Shenango Valley Cemetery. Brown at some point also worked as the director of the Grove City College.
