= Thomas D. Danner =

American politician

Thomas Daniel Danner
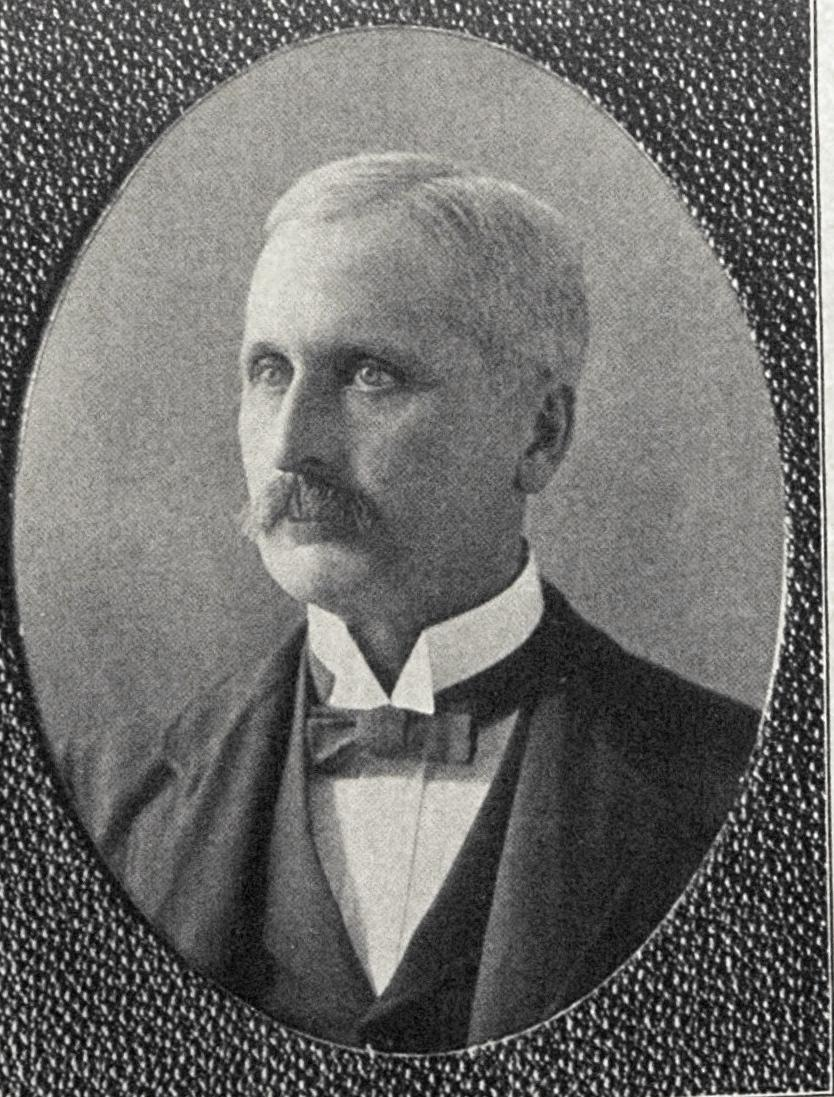
- A January 1906 illustration of Danner

Northampton County Orphan's court Clerk
- In office 1927–1929

Member of the Pennsylvania Senate from the 18th district
- In office 1903–1906
- Preceded by: Jacob B. Kemerer
- Succeeded by: Benjamin Franklin Miller

Northampton County Democratic Committee Chairman
- In office 1901–1904

Easton city solicitor
- In office 1898–1902

Northampton County Prison Board of Inspectors Solicitor
- In office 1892–1904

Personal details
- Born: September 5, 1851 Moore Township, Pennsylvania, U.S.
- Died: September 19, 1929 (aged 78) Easton, Pennsylvania, U.S.
- Party: Democratic
- Spouse: Sarah Alice Née Howell
- Children: John Howell Danner; Harriet Danner Ritter
- Education: Keystone State Normal School; Michigan State University College of Law
- Occupation: Lawyer; Educator

Thomas Daniel Danner was an American politician from Pennsylvania who represented Northampton County in the Pennsylvania Senate in the 18th district as a Democrat for one term from 1903 to 1906.

== Early life and education ==
Danner was born September 5, 1851, in Moore Township, Pennsylvania, the son of John Adam Danner and Mary Ann Née Graver. He attended Weaversville Academy in East Allen Township, Pennsylvania and then Keystone State Normal School in Kutztown, Pennsylvania, where he completed his undergraduate degree. He then studied law at the Michigan State University College of Law in East Lansing, Michigan, where he graduated and was admitted to the State Bar of Michigan in 1879.

== Career ==
He worked as a teacher in Northampton County, Pennsylvania school system and was Coplay, Pennsylvania's school director. He was named to the Northampton Bar in 1890 and was named the Solicitor of the Northampton County Prison Board of Inspectors from 1892 to 1904. He also served as Easton's city solicitor from 1898 to 1902. He was elected chair of the Northampton County Democratic Committee, serving from 1901 to 1904. He then served two terms in the Pennsylvania Senate from 1903 to 1906. After retiring from politics he resumed his law practice in Easton and served as the Northampton County Orphan's court Clerk.

== Personal life ==
Danner married Sarah Alice Née Howell and the couple had two children; John Howell Danner and Harriet Danner Ritter.

== Death ==
Danner died from liver cancer in Easton, Pennsylvania, on September 19, 1929, at the age of 78. He is buried at Fairview Cemetery in Northampton, Pennsylvania.
