= Joseph Uliana =

American politician

Joseph M. Uliana

Member of the Pennsylvania Senate from the 18th district
- In office January 3, 1995 – November 30, 1998
- Preceded by: Jeanette Reibman
- Succeeded by: Lisa Boscola

Member of the Pennsylvania House of Representatives from the 135th district
- In office January 1, 1991 – November 30, 1994
- Preceded by: William Rybach
- Succeeded by: Lisa Boscola

Personal details
- Born: November 19, 1965 (age 60) Bethlehem, Pennsylvania, U.S.

Joseph M. Uliana (born November 19, 1965) is an American politician from Pennsylvania who served as a Republican member of the Pennsylvania House of Representatives for the 135th district from 1991 to 1994 and the Pennsylvania State Senate for the 18th district from 1995 to 1998.

== Biography ==
Born in Bethlehem, Pennsylvania on November 19, 1965, Uliana graduated from Bethlehem Catholic High School in 1983 and received a B.A. from Lehigh University in 1987.

He was elected to the Pennsylvania House of Representatives for the 135th district in 1990 and served from 1991 to 1994.

He had an unsuccessful campaign for U.S. Congress in 1998. He worked as a lobbyist for Malady & Wooten from 2000 to 2009 and for J.M. Uliana & Associates since 2009.
