= Henry Souther =

American politician

Surveyor General of Pennsylvania
- In office 1861–1861

Member of the Pennsylvania Senate from the 18th district
- In office 1856–1858
- Preceded by: Byron Delano Hamlin
- Succeeded by: George W. Brewer

Elk County Treasurer
- In office 1847–1849

Personal details
- Born: March 5, 1826 Charlestown, Massachusetts
- Died: April 4, 1891 (aged 65) Lynn, Massachusetts
- Party: Republican
- Spouse: Letitia Souther
- Children: John K. Souther

Henry Souther was an American politician who served in the Pennsylvania State Senate, representing the 18th district as a Republican.

== Biography ==
Henry Souther was born in the then independent city of Charlestown, Massachusetts (today part of Boston) on March 5, 1826 to Joseph and Hepsie Souther. He attended the Walpole Academy in New Hampshire, the Maine Academy in Charlestown graduating in 1840. He moved to Ridgway in Elk County, Pennsylvania in 1842 marrying Letitia née Patterson, having a son, John K. Souther, in 1850.

Souther was elected the treasurer of Elk county, serving from 1847 to 1849 before being elected to the state senate for a single term from 1856 to 1858 as a Republican. He was named a delegate to the 1860 Republican National Convention, and was appointed the Surveyor General of Pennsylvania by governor Andrew Gregg Curtin for a single year in 1861. Souther would also be named a delegate to the 1868 Republican National Convention before being appointed the County Judge of Schuylkill County from 1871 to 1872.

Souther would then retire from politics, moving to Erie, living there from 1872 to 1890 before moving back to Massachusetts, living in Everett. On April 4, 1891, Souther dropped dead in the street of Lynn and was buried in the Woodlawn Cemetery in Everett.
