= Harry Morgan (politician) =

American politician

James Henry Morgan

Member of the Pennsylvania Senate from the 18th district
- In office 1911–1917
- Preceded by: Benjamin Franklin Miller
- Succeeded by: William Clayton Hackett

Personal details
- Born: September 19, 1857 Bethlehem, Pennsylvania
- Died: December 13, 1933 (aged 76)
- Party: Democratic
- Spouse: Laura A. Faust
- Occupation: Merchant

James Henry Morgan (September 19, 1857 – December 13, 1933) was an American politician who served as a Democrat for Pennsylvania's 18th district of the State Senate from 1911 to 1914.

== Formative years and family ==
Morgan was born on September 19, 1857, to Jesse H. Morgan and Sophia A. Née Brunner in Bethlehem, Pennsylvania. He attended the Moravian Parochial School and engaged in a local mercantile business.

He married Laura A. Née Faust.

== Career ==
Morgan was elected to the Board of Prison Inspectors of Northampton County and was then elected Clerk of the Court of Quarter Sessions of Northampton County from 1903 to 1910. That year, he was elected to the State Senate and served two terms, retiring in 1914.

== Death and interment ==
Morgan died in Bethlehem on December 13, 1933, at the age of 76. He was buried at the Memorial Park Cemetery.
