= David Engleman =

American politician (1835–1913)

Doctor David Engleman
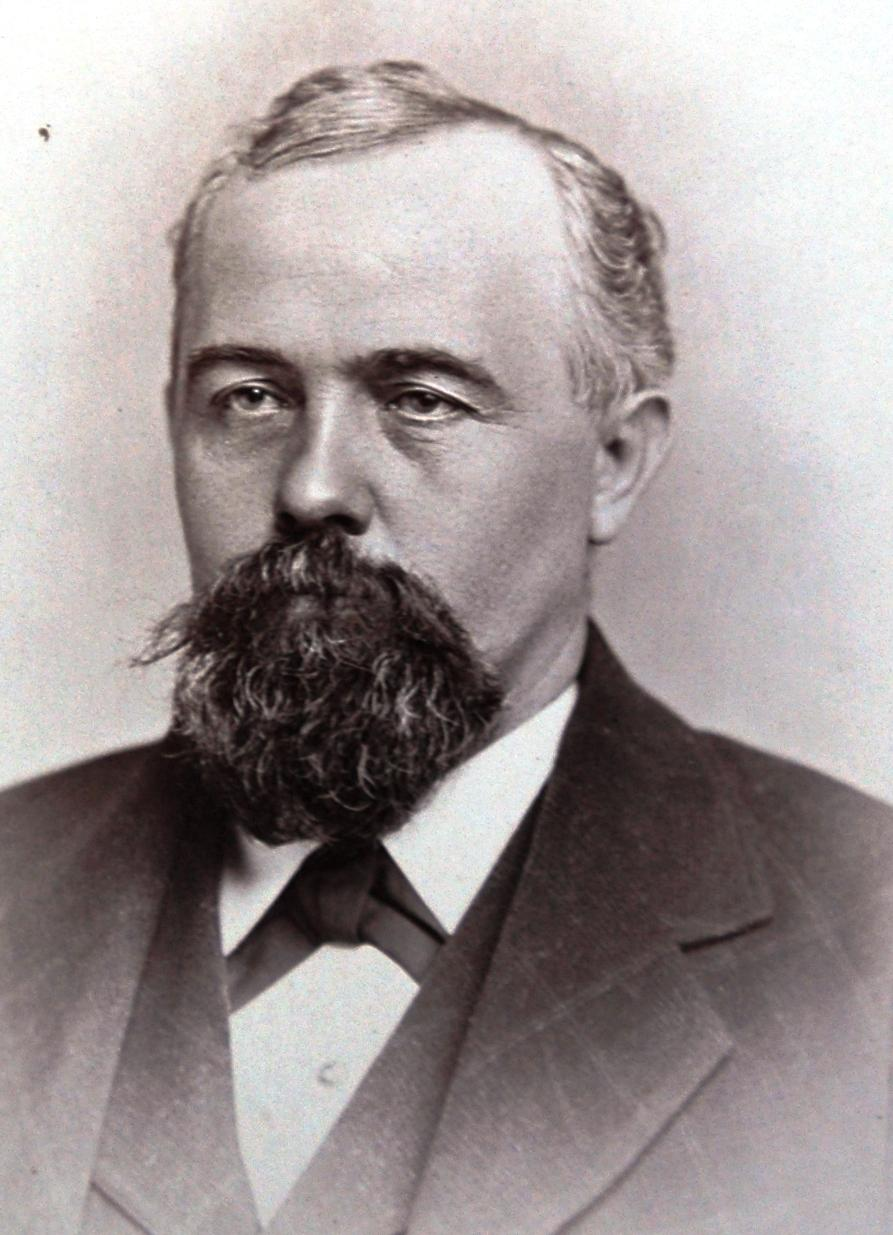
- Engleman's 1878 Senate Portrait

Member of the Pennsylvania Senate from the 18th district
- In office 1877–1878
- Preceded by: Samuel C. Shimer
- Succeeded by: William Beidelman

Member of the Pennsylvania House of Representatives
- In office 1870–1871

Personal details
- Born: December 30, 1835 Bath, Pennsylvania
- Died: May 14, 1913 (aged 77) Easton, Pennsylvania
- Party: Democratic
- Spouse(s): Amanda M. Née Lerch (died 1866); Rebecca S. Ruhe Née Ettinger (married 1870)
- Education: Jefferson Medical College
- Occupation: Doctor

Doctor David Engleman (1835-1913) was an American politician from Pennsylvania that represented the 18th district of the Pennsylvania State Senate as a Democrat from 1877 to 1878.

== Biography ==
David Engleman was born in Bath, Pennsylvania to Abraham Engleman and Maria Magdalena Polly Née Patterson on December 30, 1835. He graduated from the Jefferson Medical College in 1864 and worked as a physician before being elected as a Democrat to the Pennsylvania House of Representatives serving for a single term from 1870 to 1871 and refused to stand for re-election. He would be elected to the Pennsylvania State Senate serving for a single term from 1877 to 1878. Afterwards he was named to the Pennsylvania State Board of Health, and was elected to the Easton city council and was the president of the Northampton County Medical Society. Engleman was married twice, first to Amanda M. Née Lerch until her death in 1866, and then remarried to Rebecca S. Ruhe Née Ettinger in 1870. Engleman died in Easton on May 14, 1913, and was buried in the Union West End Cemetery in Allentown.
