= Charles Alexander Black =

American politician from Pennsylvania

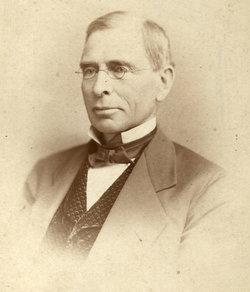
- Superintendent Portrait

Pennsylvania Superintendent of Public Instruction
- In office 1852–1855
- Governor: William Bigler

Member of the Pennsylvania Senate from the 22nd district
- In office 1844–1848
- Preceded by: Samuel Hays
- Succeeded by: Maxwell McCaslin

Member of the Pennsylvania Senate from the 18th district
- In office 1843–1844
- Preceded by: James X. McLanahan
- Succeeded by: Thomas Erskine Carson

Personal details
- Born: February 6, 1808 Greene County, Pennsylvania
- Died: March 6, 1889 (aged 81) Waynesburg, Pennsylvania
- Party: Democratic
- Spouse: Maria Allison Black
- Children: 2
- Occupation: Lawyer

Charles Alexander Black (February 6, 1808 - March 6, 1889) was an American Democratic politician from Greene County, Pennsylvania who served in the Pennsylvania Senate from 1843 to 1848 as well as the Superintendent of Public Instruction during the tenure of Governor William Bigler.

== Biography ==
Charles Alexander Black was born on a family farm in Greene County, Pennsylvania to Jacob and Margaret Grinstaff Black on February 6, 1808. Due to the lack of rural public education at the time, Black never had a formal education, only being taught by the occasional traveling circuit teacher. Black's first job was working as a clerk at his brother's general goods store, and shortly after he started studying and reading law in Greensboro, Pennsylvania. Back would receive a lawyer's apprenticeship from two attorneys, Enos Hook and Samuel Cleavinger, both based out of Waynesburg, Pennsylvania.

Black served seven years in the Pennsylvania Senate, first briefly for the 18th district starting in 1843 before being redistricted to the 22nd district in 1844. Governor William Bigler named him the secretary and superintendent of Public Instruction, today the Department of Education, where he fought for free public law schools with open unrestricted admissions, but was ultimately unsuccessful. Black's lasting contribution to public education in Pennsylvania would be the creation of school districts across the state to ensure rural public schooling. Black served as a delegate to the Pennsylvania Constitutional Convention of 1872–1874, that was the fourth Constitutional Convention in the state, with its constitution being replaced by another convention in 1968.

After leaving politics, Black became a partner of the Waynesburg and Washington Railroad in 1875. Black was married to Maria Allison Black, and the couple had two children, Mary Allison Black Inghram and Albert S. Black. Mary would predecease Charles in 1871. Charles Alexander Black died on March 6, 1889, and is buried in the Green Mount Cemetery in Waynesburg.
