= Pennsylvania House of Representatives, District 135 =

American legislative district

Pennsylvania's 135th State House of Representatives district
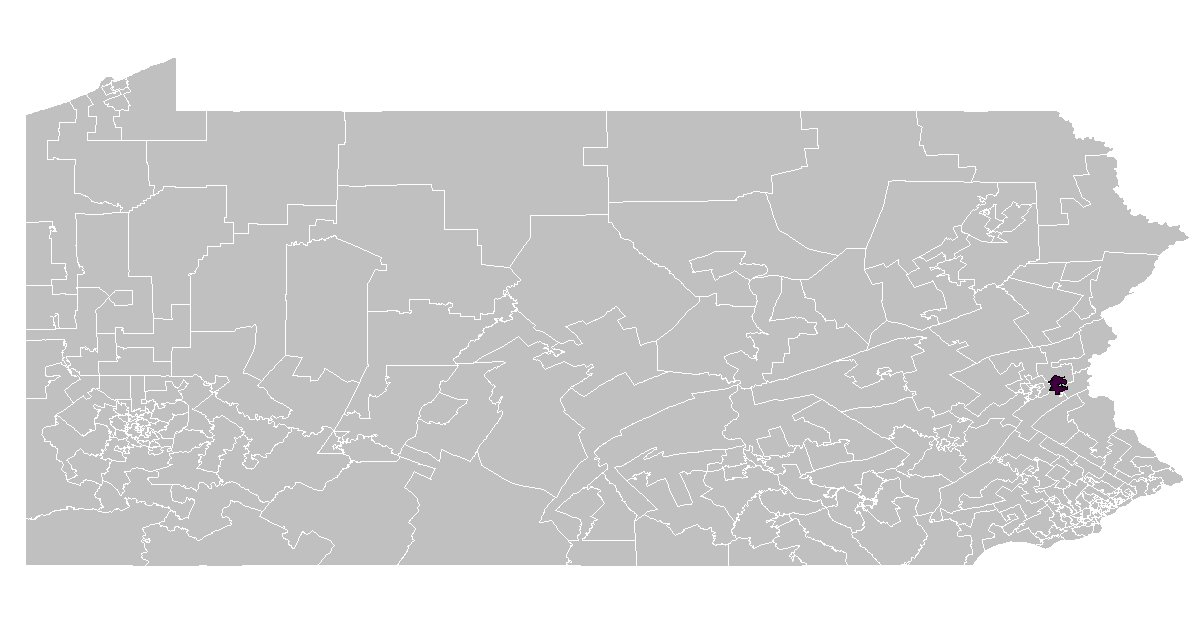
Representative
| Steve Samuelson; D–Bethlehem |
- Demographics: 76.3% White; 7.1% Black; 24.9% Hispanic
- Population (2011) • Citizens of voting age: 64,957; 51,727

The 135th Pennsylvania House of Representatives District is located in the Lehigh Valley and has been represented since 1999 by Steve Samuelson.

== District profile ==
The 135th Pennsylvania House of Representatives District is located in Northampton County. It includes Moravian College and Lehigh University. It is made up of the following areas:

- Bethlehem (Northampton County Portion)
- Hanover Township (PART, Districts 01, 02, 03, 04, and 06)

== Representatives ==
| Representative | Party | Years | District home | Note |
Prior to 1969, seats were apportioned by county.
| William C. Ryback | Democrat | 1969 – 1972 | | |
| Thomas J. Maloney | Republican | 1973 – 1974 | | |
| J. Michael Schweder | Democrat | 1975 – 1980 | | |
| William C. Rybach | Democrat | 1981 – 1990 | | |
| Joseph Uliana | Republican | 1991 – 1994 | | |
| Lisa Boscola | Democrat | 1995 – 1998 | Bethlehem Township | Elected to the Pennsylvania State Senate |
| Steve Samuelson | Democrat | 1999 – present | Bethlehem | Incumbent |

== Recent election results ==
PA House election, 2000: Pennsylvania House, District 135
| Party | Candidate | Votes | % | ±% |
|---|---|---|---|---|
| Democratic | Steve Samuelson | 13,002 | 52.6 | |
| Republican | Mark S. Mitman | 11,733 | 47.4 | |
| Margin of victory | | 1,269 | 5.2 | |
| Turnout | | 24,735 | 100 | |

PA House election, 2002: Pennsylvania House, District 135
| Party | Candidate | Votes | % | ±% |
|---|---|---|---|---|
| Democratic | Steve Samuelson | 10,616 | 64.4 | ▲11.8 |
| Republican | Keith A. Strunk | 5,881 | 35.6 | ▼11.8 |
| Margin of victory | | 4,735 | 28.8 | ▲23.6 |
| Turnout | | 16,497 | 100 | |

PA House election, 2004: Pennsylvania House, District 135
| Party | Candidate | Votes | % | ±% |
|---|---|---|---|---|
| Democratic | Steve Samuelson | 16,960 | 65.1 | ▲0.7 |
| Republican | David A. Donio | 9,098 | 34.9 | ▼0.7 |
| Margin of victory | | 7,862 | 30.2 | ▼1.4 |
| Turnout | | 26,058 | 100 | |

PA House election, 2006: Pennsylvania House, District 135
| Party | Candidate | Votes | % | ±% |
|---|---|---|---|---|
| Democratic | Steve Samuelson | 14,828 | 100 | ▲34.9 |
| Margin of victory | | 14,828 | 100 | ▲58.96 |
| Turnout | | 14,828 | 100 | |

PA House election, 2008: Pennsylvania House, District 135
| Party | Candidate | Votes | % | ±% |
|---|---|---|---|---|
| Democratic | Steve Samuelson | 21,069 | 100 | |
| Margin of victory | | 21,069 | 100 | |
| Turnout | | 21,069 | 100 | |

PA House election, 2010: Pennsylvania House, District 135
| Party | Candidate | Votes | % | ±% |
|---|---|---|---|---|
| Democratic | Steve Samuelson | 8,922 | 100 | |
| Margin of victory | | 8,922 | 100 | |
| Turnout | | 8,922 | 100 | |

PA House election, 2012: Pennsylvania House, District 135
| Party | Candidate | Votes | % | ±% |
|---|---|---|---|---|
| Democratic | Steve Samuelson | 12,722 | 70.52 | ▼29.48 |
| Republican | Kenneth Barreto | 5,318 | 29.48 | ▲29.48 |
| Margin of victory | | 7,404 | 41.04 | ▼58.96 |
| Turnout | | 20,126 | 100 | |

PA House election, 2014: Pennsylvania House, District 135
| Party | Candidate | Votes | % | ±% |
|---|---|---|---|---|
| Democratic | Steve Samuelson | 9,387 | 100 | ▲29.48 |
| Margin of victory | | 9,387 | 100 | ▲58.96 |
| Turnout | | 9,387 | 100 | |

PA House election, 2016: Pennsylvania House, District 135
| Party | Candidate | Votes | % | ±% |
|---|---|---|---|---|
| Democratic | Steve Samuelson | 19,431 | 100 | |
| Margin of victory | | 19,431 | 100 | |
| Turnout | | 19,431 | 100 | |

PA House election, 2018: Pennsylvania House, District 135
| Party | Candidate | Votes | % | ±% |
|---|---|---|---|---|
| Democratic | Steve Samuelson | 15,872 | 100 | |
| Margin of victory | | 15,872 | 100 | |
| Turnout | | 15,872 | 100 | |

PA House election, 2020: Pennsylvania House, District 135
| Party | Candidate | Votes | % | ±% |
|---|---|---|---|---|
| Democratic | Steve Samuelson | 19,924 | 65.6 | ▼34.4 |
| Republican | Scott Hough | 10,438 | 34.4 | ▲34.4 |
| Margin of victory | | 9,486 | 31.2 | ▼68.8 |
| Turnout | | 30,362 | 100 | |
