= Charles A.P. Bartlett =

American politician

Captain Charles Allen Parker Bartlett

Pennsylvania Senate Librarian
- In office February 15, 1943 – March 18, 1948

Member of the Pennsylvania Senate from the 18th district
- In office 1939–1942
- Preceded by: William G. Barthold
- Succeeded by: Carleton T. Woodring

Wilson Borough President

Personal details
- Born: November 17, 1880 Concord, Massachusetts
- Died: March 18, 1948 (aged 67) Harrisburg, Pennsylvania
- Party: Republican
- Spouse: Mildred E. Richards

Military service
- Branch/service: United States Army
- Years of service: 1917-1919
- Rank: Captain
- Battles/wars: World War I

Charles Allen Parker Bartlett (November 17, 1880 – March 18, 1948), was an American politician from Pennsylvania who served in the Pennsylvania State Senate, representing the 18th district from 1939 to 1942. During his tenure, the 18th district represented the Northampton County, Pennsylvania.

== Biography ==
=== Early life ===
Bartlett was born in Concord, Massachusetts, on November 17, 1880, to Charles H. Bartlett and Mary A. Née Hobson. When he was a child, his family moved to Easton, Pennsylvania, where he received a public high school education and did not attend college. He worked as a secretary, treasurer, and sales agent for local manufacturing firms from 1904 to 1933.

=== Military Service ===
Bartlett joined the Pennsylvania National Guard in 1904 and during World War I, achieved the rank of Captain commanding Rainbow Division's 149th Machine Gun Battalion's Company A, as part of the American Expeditionary Forces from 1917 to 1919. After the war, he also served as a Major of the Pennsylvania National Guard's coastal artillery until 1923.

=== Political career ===
After completing his service Bartlett was elected president of Wilson, Pennsylvania, for four years and was also elected the borough's Treasurer for nine years before being elected to the Pennsylvania State Senate from 1939 to 1942, during which he served as chairman of the welfare committee. Afterwards he was elected the Pennsylvania Senate Librarian from 1943 to 1948.

=== Later life ===
Bartlett married Mildred E. Née Richards. He died on March 18, 1948, in Harrisburg, Pennsylvania, at the age of 67. He is buried in Sleepy Hollow Cemetery in his native Concord.
