= Thomas J. Maloney (representative) =

American politician

Member of the Pennsylvania House of Representatives from the 135th district
- In office 1973–1974
- Preceded by: William C. Rybak
- Succeeded by: J. Michael Schweder

Personal details
- Born: August 13, 1939 (age 86) Bethlehem, Pennsylvania
- Party: Republican

Thomas J. Maloney (born August 13, 1939) is a former Republican member of the Pennsylvania House of Representatives.
