= Timothy Ives (politician) =

American politician

Timothy Ives Jr.
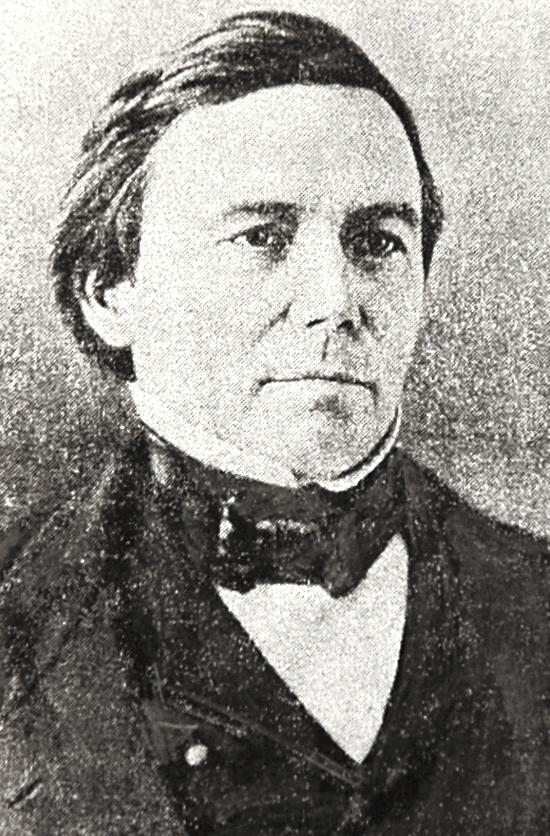
- Ives' Senate portrait

Member of the Pennsylvania Senate from the 18th district
- In office 1851–1852
- Preceded by: William Richard Sadler
- Succeeded by: Byron Delano Hamlin

Member of the Pennsylvania Senate from the 28th district
- In office 1849–1851
- Preceded by: James Lyle Giles
- Succeeded by: Charles Frailey

Member of the Pennsylvania House of Representatives
- In office 1846–1848

Treasurer of Tioga County
- In office 1825–1826

Personal details
- Born: February 6, 1802 Beechers Island, Tioga County, Pennsylvania
- Died: October 18, 1866 (age 64) Coudersport Potter County, Pennsylvania
- Party: Democratic
- Spouse: Marta née Andrews

Timothy Ives Jr. was an American politician from Pennsylvania, representing the 18th and 28th districts of the Pennsylvania State Senate as a Democrat.

== Biography ==
Ives was born on February 6, 1802, on Beechers Island, an early frontier settlement in Tioga County, Pennsylvania to Timothy Sr. and Sarah Ives. Ives worked as a local school teacher before marrying Marta née Andrews in 1823. Ives political career started when he was elected the treasurer of Tioga County for a single term from 1825 to 1826.

Ives moved to Coudersport in Potter County where he worked as a cloth and dry good's salesmen, and was eventually appointed the justice of the peace, and in 1832 he was named the postmaster of the borough. At that time of his arrival in Coudersport the settlement consisted of a single dwelling house and Commissioners’ Office. Ives also worked as an associate judge in the Potter County court for 9 years and was the proprietor to a number of local newspapers; The Potter Pennon, 1839–1842, The Democratic Republican, 1842–1843, The Potter Pioneer, 1843–1851, The Union, 1851–1854, Highland Patriot, 1854–1858, and the Northern Democrat, 1858–1860.

Ives was elected to the Pennsylvania House of Representatives for three one year terms in 1846, 1847 and 1848 as a Democrat. Afterwards Ives was elected to the Pennsylvania State Senate, representing the 28th district from 1849 to 1851, and the 18th district from 1851 to 1852.

Ives would then be named the superintendent of the Portage Railroad from 1851 to 1852 and after leaving office worked as a lumberman in railroad construction. Ives died in Coudersport on October 18, 1866, and is buried in the Eulalia Cemetery.
