= Samuel Leas Carpenter =

American politician

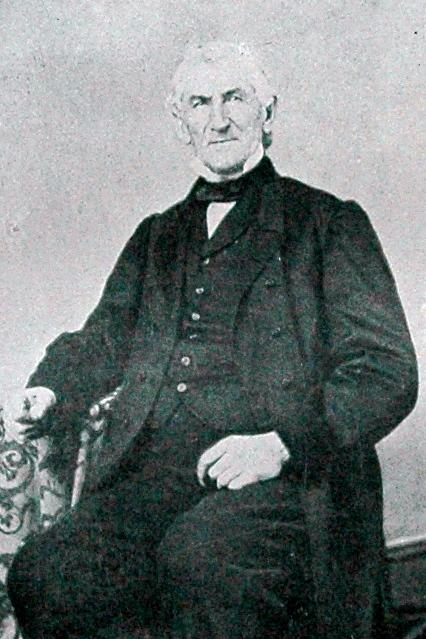

Member of the Pennsylvania Senate from the 18th district
- In office 1835–1837
- Preceded by: John Klingensmith Jr.
- Succeeded by: William F. Coplan

Member of the Pennsylvania Senate from the 16th district
- In office 1837–1839

Personal details
- Born: June 10, 1795 York County, Pennsylvania
- Died: November 9, 1876 (aged 81) Westmoreland County, Pennsylvania
- Party: Democratic
- Spouse: Keziah Jane Irwin
- Children: 5

Samuel Leas Carpenter was an American politician from Pennsylvania who served in the Pennsylvania State Senate, representing the 18th district from 1835 to 1837 and the 16th district from 1837 to 1839.

== Biography ==
Born on June 10, 1795, Samuel L. Carpenter was a son of Daniel Leas Carpenter, an associate judge, schoolteacher and county surveyor, and his wife, Mary Leas Carpenter. He married Keziah Jane Irwin in 1819 and had five children: Samuel, Mariah, Keziah, Lavina, and Ann Leas Carpenter.

During his legislative tenure, the districts served by Carpenter both represented Westmoreland County in Western Pennsylvania.

== Death and interment ==
Carpenter died on November 9, 1876, and was buried in the Saint Clair Cemetery in Greensburg, Pennsylvania.
