= Jacob B. Kemerer =

American politician

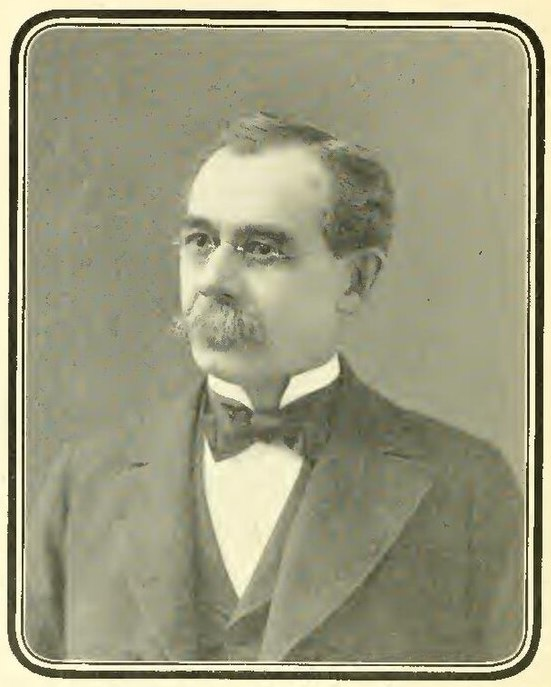

Member of the Pennsylvania Senate from the 18th district
- In office 1899–1901
- Preceded by: Henry D. Heller
- Succeeded by: Thomas D. Danner

Chief Burgess of Bethlehem
- In office 1887–1893

Solicitor of Bethlehem
- In office 1892–1893

Bethlehem council president
- In office 1885–1887

Bethlehem councilmen
- In office 1880–1887

Personal details
- Born: December 21, 1844 Center Valley, Pennsylvania
- Died: October 16, 1901 (aged 56) Harrisburg, Pennsylvania
- Party: Democratic
- Spouse: Amanda J. Née Seem
- Children: Albert G. Kemerer
- Occupation: Lawyer

Jacob B. Kemerer (1844-1901) was an American politician who served in the Pennsylvania State Senate as a Democrat, representing Northampton County for one term from 1899 to 1901.

== Biography ==
Kemerer was born in Center Valley, Pennsylvania to German immigrants Benjamin Kemerer and Mary Née Bachman on December 21, 1844. While he was still a child his family moved to Freemansburg, Pennsylvania and then in 1848 to Philadelphia. There Jacob received a public school education, receiving a high school diploma from Central High School as part of the class of 1861. He worked in the wholesaling business and read law with Judge U.J. Wenner of Bethlehem, Pennsylvania and was admitted to the bar in 1876. He opened a partnership with Clarence Wolle specializing in real estate and fire insurance in 1886. He was a member of the Bethlehem council from 1880 to 1887, elected president of the council from 1885 to 1887, and served as Chief Burgess of Bethlehem from 1887 to 1893. During his time in the council he chaired the city's Street, Water, Law, and Police Committees. He was elected the city's solicitor from 1892 to 1893 and was elected to the State Senate in 1898. He served on the committee of Judiciary General and was noted to be well versed in Legalese and gave his fellow senators meaningful insight into legal practices when relevant. He would be unable to attend many sessions do to an ongoing battle with Bright's disease which ultimately took his life on October 16, 1901, at the age of 56.

=== Senate memorial ===
Since Kemerer died while in office, a lengthy and well documented funeral and memorial by the Senate would take place, with the proceedings being archived in the Library of Congress and the Smithsonian Institution. On Wednesday, January 25, 1903, a special session was called in the Senate where Senate Chaplin Wesley Sullivan and President pro tempore, John Scott lead the Senate in prayer. Scott, Kemerer's successor Thomas D. Danner, and various other senators, would then go on to reflect on Kemerer's life.

== Personal life ==
Kemerer married Amanda J. Née Seem in 1865 and the couple had a son, Albert G. Kemerer. Jacob was a member of the Independent Order of Red Men, Knights of Pythias and the Benevolent and Protective Order of Elks. Kemerer was Presbyterian, and one of the few Chief Burgesses that was not a member of the Moravian Church, regardless, he is buried in the God's Acre in Bethlehem.
