= George Hough Bucher =

American politician (1797–1884)

Member of the Pennsylvania Senate from the 18th district
- In office 1865–1866
- Preceded by: William McSherry
- Succeeded by: James C. Brown

Member of the Pennsylvania Senate from the 14th district
- In office 1863–1865
- Preceded by: Erasmus Darwin Crawford
- Succeeded by: John Walls

Personal details
- Born: June 15, 1797 Leukens Valley, Pennsylvania
- Died: November 27, 1884 (aged 87) Mechanicsburg, Pennsylvania
- Party: Democratic
- Spouse(s): Rebecca Née Pool (died 1829); Hanna Hough
- Children: 4
- Occupation: Merchandising

George Horter Bucher (1797-1884) was an American politician from Pennsylvania who represented the 14th and 18th districts of the Pennsylvania Senate from 1863 to 1866 as a Democrat.

== Biography ==
George Hough Bucher was born June 15, 1797, in Leukens Valley in Dauphin County to Johann Jacob and Susannah Margaret Horter. He graduated from the Dauphin County Latin School and the Harrisburg Academy before working in merchandising and moved to Hogestown in Cumberland County in 1836. He was elected as a Democrat to the 14th District of the Pennsylvania Senate in 1862, serving from 1863 to 1865 when he got redistricted to the 18th District. He married twice, first to Rebecca Pool who died in 1829 without any children, and a second time to Hanna Hough. The couple had four children: Robert Allen Bucher, Ellen Bucher Cresswell, Clare Maria Bucher Scott, and Hannah Cordelia Bucher Ployer. George Hough Bucher died on Thanksgiving, November 27, 1884 in Mechanicsburg where he is interred in the Chestnut Hill Cemetery.
