= William Beidelman =

American politician

Second Lieutenant William Beidelman
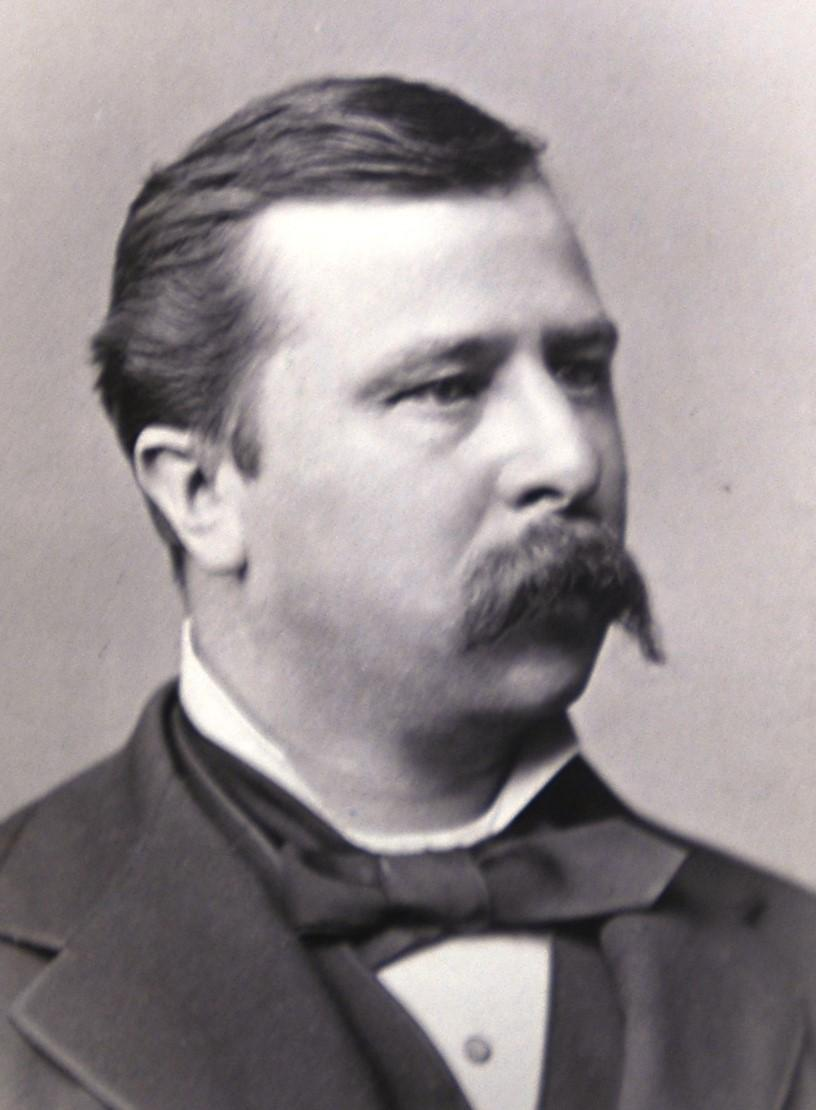

2nd Mayor of Easton, Pennsylvania
- In office 1890–1894
- Preceded by: Charles F. Chidsey
- Succeeded by: Benjamin Rush Field

Solicitor of Easton Borough
- In office 1885–1887

Member of the Pennsylvania Senate from the 18th district
- In office 1879–1882
- Preceded by: David Engleman
- Succeeded by: Jeremiah S. Hess

Northampton County, Pennsylvania District Attorney
- In office 1871–1874

Northampton County Deputy Sheriff
- In office 1865–1867

Personal details
- Born: January 17, 1840 Lower Saucon Township, Pennsylvania, U.S.
- Died: February 1, 1903 (aged 63) Easton, Pennsylvania, U.S.
- Party: Democratic Party
- Spouse: Mary Slator
- Education: Troy University; Rensselaer Polytechnic Institute; Albany Law School
- Occupation: Lawyer

Military service
- Branch/service: Union (American Civil War)
- Years of service: April 18, 1861–July 24, 1863
- Rank: Second Lieutenant

William Beidelman (1840-1903) was an American politician from the Lehigh Valley region of eastern Pennsylvania. He served in the Union Army during the American Civil War and saw combat at the Battle of Gettysburg, which was the war's turning point in the Union's favor but also its bloodiest battle.

After the end of the Civil War, Beidelman served in various Northampton County offices prior to his election as a Democrat to the Pennsylvania State Senate. He also served as the second mayor of Easton, Pennsylvania.

== Early life and education ==
Beidelman was born in Lower Saucon Township on January 17, 1840, to Daniel Beidelman and Anna Née Margaret and had a brother, Robert C. Beidelman. Shortly following his birth, the family moved locally to Williams Township, where he was raised. He attended public school and then the New York Conference Seminary prior to attending Troy University and Rensselaer Polytechnic Institute. He received a law degree from the Albany Law School.

== Career ==
=== Union Army ===
After graduating, Beidelman volunteered for the Union Army on April 18, 1861, and served for nine months in the 153rd Pennsylvania Volunteers Infantry as a Second Lieutenant. He saw combat at the Battle of Aldie, the Mud March, Battle of Chancellorsville, Battle of Gettysburg, and the Battle of Funkstown before he was mustered out of service on July 24, 1863.

=== Northampton County ===
After leaving the Union Army, Beidelman served in various positions in the Northampton county government as a Democrat. Including from 1865 to 1867 when he was the county's deputy sheriff. In 1868 he was admitted to the Northampton Bar association as an attorney as well as briefly being editor of the Northampton Democrat. He was elected District Attorney of Northampton County in 1871 and served until 1874.

=== Pennsylvania State Senate ===
In 1879, Beidelman was elected to the Pennsylvania Senate, where he represented the 18th District and served in the office from 1879 to 1882; he did not stand for re-election.

=== Mayor of Easton ===
Beidelman became the solicitor of Easton, Pennsylvania while it was still a borough in 1885 and prior to it being elevated to a city in 1887. He later ran successfully to become the city's second mayor and first Democrat mayor in 1889. His term began in 1890; he did not seek reelection in 1893, and his term expired in 1894.

== Author ==
In 1898, he published a book, The Story of the Pennsylvania Germans, which explored the origin, history, and dialect of the Pennsylvania Dutch. In gathering research for the book he personally made several trips to Germany.

He also wrote a column for The Express-Times, "Antiquary", where he predominantly covered items related to the history of Northampton County.

== Death ==
Beidelman died in 1903 after a four-day battle with illness. Flags across Easton, Pennsylvania were lowered to half mast in his honor, even though Beidelman insisted that no special formal action be taken after his death.

Beidelman's tombstone inscription reads simply: "HE FOUGHT FOR HIS COUNTRY AT GETTYSBURG"

== Personal life ==
Beidelman married Mary née Slator shortly after leaving the U.S. Army and remained married to her until his death. The couple had no issue. Beidelman was a member of the Jacksonian Democratic Association, a Freemason, achieving the rank of Knights Templar and a member of the Grand Army of the Republic.
