= Warren R. Roberts =

American politician

Warren Roscoe Roberts

34th Auditor General of Pennsylvania
- In office 1937–1941
- Governor: George Howard Earle III
- Preceded by: Frank E. Baldwin
- Succeeded by: F. Clair Ross

Pennsylvania Senate Minority Floor Leader
- In office 1935–1936

Member of the Pennsylvania Senate from the 18th district
- In office 1927–1937
- Preceded by: Harry D. Kutz
- Succeeded by: William G. Barthold

Northampton County Committeeman

Personal details
- Born: December 29, 1874 Freemansburg, Pennsylvania, U.S.
- Died: February 3, 1960 (aged 85) Bethlehem, Pennsylvania, U.S.
- Party: Democratic
- Spouse: Sadie Louise Dreisbach,

Warren Roscoe Roberts was an American politician from Pennsylvania who served as Pennsylvania Auditor General from 1937 to 1941 and previously served in the Pennsylvania State Senate, representing the 18th district from 1927 to 1937.

== Biography ==
Roberts was born in Freemansburg, Pennsylvania on December 29, 1874, to John Roberts and Sarah Anne Née Hendricks. He attended public school in Freemansburg and received no college education. He and Victor Woodring co-founded the Woodring-Roberts insurance corporation. In 1905 he was elected to the Northampton County committee serving as their recorder of deeds. Roberts held several jobs including working as a reporter for the Bethlehem Times (later merged into The Express-Times), a real estate agent, an insurance broker and a banker.

Roberts was elected to the Pennsylvania State Senate in 1927 to represent Northampton county in the 18th district as a Democrat and served as the minority floor leader from 1935 to 1936. He resigned on April 14, 1937, when he was elected the Auditor general. He would serve as the auditor general for a full term until 1941. He was also elected as a delegate to the 1940 Democratic National Convention.

== Personal life ==
Roberts married Sadie Louise Née Dreisbach in 1908. He died on February 3, 1960, in St. Luke's Hospital in Bethlehem at the age of 85. He was buried in Nisky Hill Cemetery, also in Bethlehem.
