= Conrad Schilp Shimer =

American politician from Pennsylvania

Member of the Pennsylvania Senate from the 9th district
- In office 1850–1852
- Preceded by: Jacob D. Boas
- Succeeded by: William Fry

Personal details
- Born: October 31, 1797 Schoenersville, Pennsylvania
- Died: March 30, 1866 (aged 68) Bethlehem, Pennsylvania
- Party: Democratic
- Spouse: Catherine née Quier
- Children: Samuel C. Shimer, Asher D. Shimer, Camilla Mary Shimer Brodhead

Conrad Schilp Shimer was an American army officer and politician who represented the Pennsylvania Senate's 9th district from 1850 to 1852.

== Biography ==
Shimer was born on October 31, 1797, in Schoenersville, Pennsylvania, to Samuel Shimer and Elisabeth née Schilp. A farmer by trade, Conrad rose to the rank of major general in the Pennsylvania militia. He would be elected to a single term in the Pennsylvania Senate from 1850 to 1852 and did not seek re-election. He was also a federal elector. After his time in office he worked as the treasurer and director of the Bethlehem Railroad Company and died on April 30, 1866 at his residence near Bethlehem, Pennsylvania.

== Personal life ==
Conrad married Catherine née Quier and the couple would have three children, Asher D. Shimer, Camilla Mary Shimer Brodhead, and most notably his eldest Samuel C. Shimer, who would also be elected to the Pennsylvania Senate, representing the 18th district from 1875 to 1876.
