= William Richard Sadler =

American politician

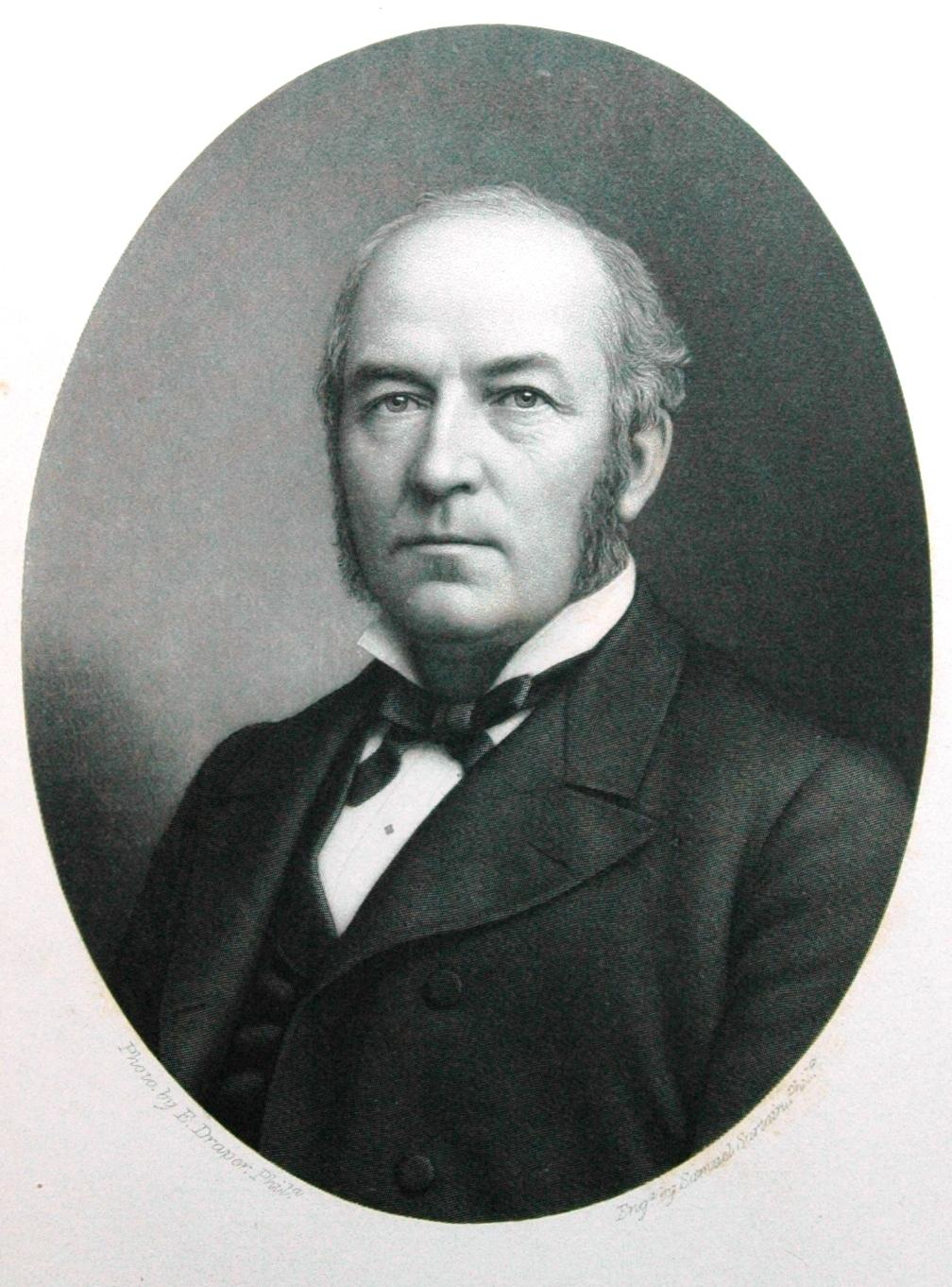
- Sadler's Senate portrait

Member of the Pennsylvania Senate from the 18th district
- In office 1847–1850
- Preceded by: Thomas Erskine Carson
- Succeeded by: Timothy Ives

Personal details
- Born: 1816
- Died: 1853 (aged 36–37)
- Party: Whig
- Children: John Durbin Sadler

William Richard Sadler was an American politician from Pennsylvania who represented the 18th district of the Pennsylvania Senate from 1847 to 1850.

William Sadler's son, John Durbin Sadler, served as a Lieutenant in the Union Army during the American Civil War, being killed in the Battle of Antietam.
