= J. Michael Schweder =

American politician (1949–2021)

Member of the Pennsylvania House of Representatives from the 135th district
- In office 1975–1980
- Preceded by: Thomas J. Maloney
- Succeeded by: William C. Rybach

Personal details
- Born: May 31, 1949 Bethlehem, Pennsylvania
- Died: January 15, 2021 (aged 71) Yardley, Pennsylvania
- Party: Democratic

John Michael Schweder (May 31, 1949 – January 15, 2021) was a Democratic member of the Pennsylvania House of Representatives.
