= Samuel C. Shimer =

American politician (1822–1885)

Member of the Pennsylvania Senate from the 18th district
- In office 1875–1876
- Preceded by: Andrew G. Miller
- Succeeded by: David Engleman

Member of the Pennsylvania House of Representatives
- In office 1864–1865

Personal details
- Born: c. 1822
- Died: October 5, 1885 (aged 63) Bethlehem, Pennsylvania
- Party: Democrat; Independent Democrat
- Spouse: Julia P. Née Meyer
- Children: Laura Shimer, Mary Catherine Shimer, Minnie C. Shimer
- Parent: Conrad Schilp Shimer
- Education: Moravian Boarding School
- Occupation: Farmer; Merchant

Samuel C. Shimer (c. 1822 – October 5, 1885) was an American politician from Pennsylvania that represented the 18th district of the Pennsylvania State Senate as an Independent Democrat from 1875 to 1876.

== Biography ==
Samuel C. Shimer was born to General Conrad Schilp Shimer in about 1822. He graduated from the Moravian Boarding School, which became Moravian College. He worked as a farmer and miller. In 1864 he was elected to the Pennsylvania House of Representatives as a member of the Democratic Party. He did not seek reelection and left office in 1865. Shimer would be the first senator elected to the redistricted 18th district of the Pennsylvania State Senate to represent Northampton County. Shimer was elected as an Independent Democrat and did not seek re-election. After leaving office Shimer worked as a Merchant and as a ticket agent for the Luzerne and Susquehanna Railroad. In 1885 Shimer sought the office of postmaster of Bethlehem, Pennsylvania, but would die prior to the election on October 5, 1885, at the age of 63. Shimer was married to Julia P. Née Meyer and had three daughters, Laura Shimer, Mary Catherine Shimer, Minnie C. Shimer.
