= Fred B. Rooney =

American politician (1925–2019)

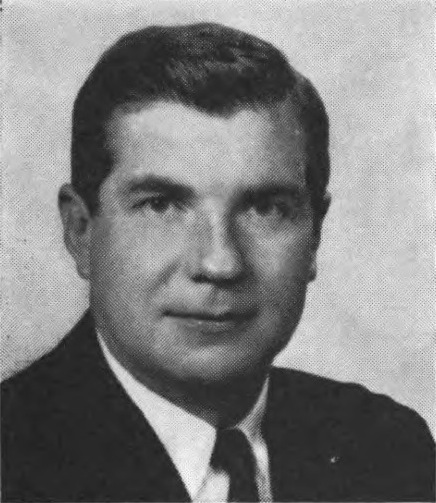

Member of the U.S. House of Representatives from Pennsylvania's 15th district
- In office July 30, 1963 – January 3, 1979
- Preceded by: Francis E. Walter
- Succeeded by: Donald L. Ritter

Member of the Pennsylvania State Senate for the 18th district
- In office November 5, 1958 – August 6, 1963
- Preceded by: Joseph J. Yosko
- Succeeded by: Gus P. Verona

Personal details
- Born: Frederick Bernard Rooney Jr. November 6, 1925 Bethlehem, Pennsylvania, U.S.
- Died: December 23, 2019 (aged 94) Washington, D.C., U.S.
- Party: Democratic
- Spouse: Evelyn Rooney
- Relatives: T. J. Rooney (nephew)
- Education: University of Georgia (Bachelor of Business Administration)

Frederick Bernard Rooney Jr. (November 6, 1925 – December 23, 2019) was an American politician from Pennsylvania who served as a Democratic member of the U.S. House of Representatives for Pennsylvania's 15th congressional district from 1963 to 1979.

== Early life and education ==
Rooney was born in Bethlehem, Pennsylvania to Fred B. (1881–1945) and Veronica K. (McGreevy) Rooney (1887–1969). He graduated from Bethlehem High School in 1944 and served in the United States Army from February 1944 to April 1946, with service in Europe as a paratrooper. He graduated from the University of Georgia in Athens, Georgia in 1950 with a Bachelor of Business Administration (BBA) degree. He worked in the real estate and insurance businesses.

== Career ==
=== Political career ===
Rooney served as a member of the Pennsylvania State Senate for the 18th district from November 5, 1958, until his resignation on August 6, 1963.

He was elected as a Democrat to the 88th Congress, by special election, to fill the vacancy caused by the death of United States Representative Francis E. Walter, and reelected to the seven succeeding Congresses. Rooney served on the House Transportation Committee, where his specialties included railroad issues. He was one of the architects of the 1976 legislation that established Conrail, which took over the operation of potentially profitable railroad companies that had fallen into bankruptcy, including the Penn Central.

He was defeated in his bid for reelection by Donald L. Ritter in 1978.

=== Post-political career ===
After leaving Congress, he joined Cassidy & Associates in Washington, D.C., one of the nation's largest government relations and lobbying firms. He later he went into business for himself, representing Conrail, the Association of American Railroads, and the American Iron and Steel Institute.

In 2009, a portion of Pennsylvania Route 378 in Bethlehem from US 22 to the Hill to Hill Bridge was renamed the Fred B. Rooney Highway, recognizing his role in the creation of that portion of the highway.

== Personal life ==
Rooney's nephew T. J. Rooney also served in the Pennsylvania General Assembly.

== Death ==
Rooney died at his home in Washington, D.C., on December 23, 2019. He was 94.

Pennsylvania State Senate
Preceded by Joseph Yosko	Member of the Pennsylvania Senate, 18th district 1958-1963	Succeeded by Gus Verona
U.S. House of Representatives
Preceded by Francis E. Walter	Member of the U.S. House of Representatives from Pennsylvania's 15th congressional district 1963-1979	Succeeded by Don Ritter
