= George W. Brewer =

American politician (1819–1886)

Member of the Pennsylvania Senate from the 18th district
- In office 1859–1860
- Preceded by: Henry Souther
- Succeeded by: Alexander Kelly McClure

Member of the Pennsylvania Senate from the 11th district
- In office 1857–1858
- Preceded by: David Mellinger
- Succeeded by: Glenni William Scofield

District Attorney of Franklin County
- In office 1846–1849

Personal details
- Born: September 5, 1819 Mercersburg, Pennsylvania
- Died: August 6, 1886 (aged 66) Chambersburg, Pennsylvania
- Party: Democratic
- Education: Franklin and Marshall College
- Occupation: Lawyer

George W. Brewer (September 5, 1819 – August 6, 1886) was an American politician from Pennsylvania who served as a Democratic State Senator from 1858 to 1860.

== Biography ==
George W. Brewer was born on September 5, 1819, in Mercersburg, Pennsylvania, to Jacob and Mary Brewer née Angle. He graduated from Franklin and Marshall College in 1842, and earned a law degree in 1845 and started reading law before becoming a lawyer in Chambersburg until 1871.

In 1846 he was elected the District Attorney of Franklin County as a Democrat, serving for a single term until 1848. In 1856 he was elected to the Pennsylvania State Senate for the 11th district, before being redistricted to the 18th district. Following the burning of Chambersburg by Jubal Early Brewer petitioned the Pennsylvania Grand Masonic lodge for aid rebuilding the city.

== Personal life ==
He married Mary Louisa Gehr in 1860 and had a daughter Harriett Cameron Brewer Stoner. Brewer was a Knights Templar of the George Washington Blue Lodge No. 56 of the Freemasons.
