= Charles F. Chidsey =

American politician

Mayor Charles Francis Chidsey
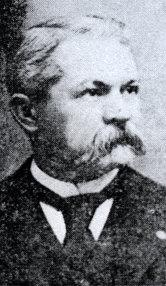
- Chidsey in July 1910

Easton City Commissioner
- In office 1913–1916
- Preceded by: Position established

Pennsylvania House Representative
- In office 1896–1898

1st Mayor of Easton
- In office April 4, 1887 – 1890
- Preceded by: Position Established
- Succeeded by: William Beidelman

Easton Borough Councilor
- In office 1883–1886

Northampton County prison inspector
- In office 1881–1886

Easton School board president
- In office 1876–1877

Personal details
- Born: December 25, 1843
- Died: January 11, 1933 (aged 89)
- Party: Republican
- Education: Lafayette College

Military service
- Branch/service: Union (American Civil War)
- Years of service: 1861–1863
- Rank: First lieutenant

Charles Francis Chidsey (December 25, 1843 – January 11, 1933) was an American politician who served as the first mayor of Easton, Pennsylvania from 1887 to 1890 and a Pennsylvania State Representative from 1896 to 1898.

== Early life and education ==
Chidsey graduated Lafayette College in Easton, Pennsylvania in 1864 and was a veteran of the American Civil War, serving in the Union Army as a private in the 129th Pennsylvania Infantry Regiment and as a first lieutenant for the 38th Regiment of the Pennsylvania Emergency Militia.

== Career ==
Following the end of the American Civil War, Chidsey pursued a career in rail and heavy industry, working as a clerk in the Chicago and Northwestern Railway, as secretary of the Warren Foundry and Machine Company, and finally as president of the Eastern Railroad Company.

His first political involvement was as president of the Easton School Board, an office he would hold from 1876 through 1877. He was then appointed as the county prison inspector by the Northampton, Pennsylvania county executive, and held that office from 1881 to 1886. During this period. he was also first elected to the borough council of Easton, holding that office from 1883 to 1886. He was elected as an alternate delegate for the 1884 Republican National Convention in Chicago and unsuccessfully ran for a seat in the U.S. House of Representatives the same year.

=== Mayor of Easton ===
Following his time as a councilor, Chidsey was elected the first mayor of Easton in February 1887, taking office on April 4, 1887. He transformed the former Borough's police, fire and electric light departments to enhance their performance and better serve the people of Easton. The department to get the largest reform would be the police which was entirely remodeled and given uniforms. He was mayor during the Great Blizzard of 1888 which saw Easton cut off from the outside world. Additionally his mayorship was engaged in a heated legal debate with the descendants of William Penn over the ownership of the old court house at Centre Circle, with the city prevailing.

He constructed a memorial arch to the memory of Governor George Wolf and sought to turn Easton into a manufacturing hub by giving loans with minimal interest to industrial firms. He did not seek a second term with his term expiring in 1890.

=== Post-mayoral career ===
After leaving office Chidsey successfully sought election to the Pennsylvania House of Representatives in 1896. He did not seek reelection and his term expired in 1898. He ran unsuccessfully for a seat in the Pennsylvania State Senate in 1906. He unsuccessfully ran for Lieutenant Governor of Pennsylvania in 1910, losing the Republican primary to John Merriman Reynolds. He was elected as one of the first Easton City Commissioners, and held the office from 1913 to 1916, but did not seek reelection.

His last public appearance was in 1931 at a Christmas banquet for Union Army veterans from Easton.

== Death ==
Chidsey died shortly after his 89th Birthday on January 11, 1933, and is buried in Easton Cemetery in Easton, Pennsylvania.
