= Steve Samuelson =

American politician

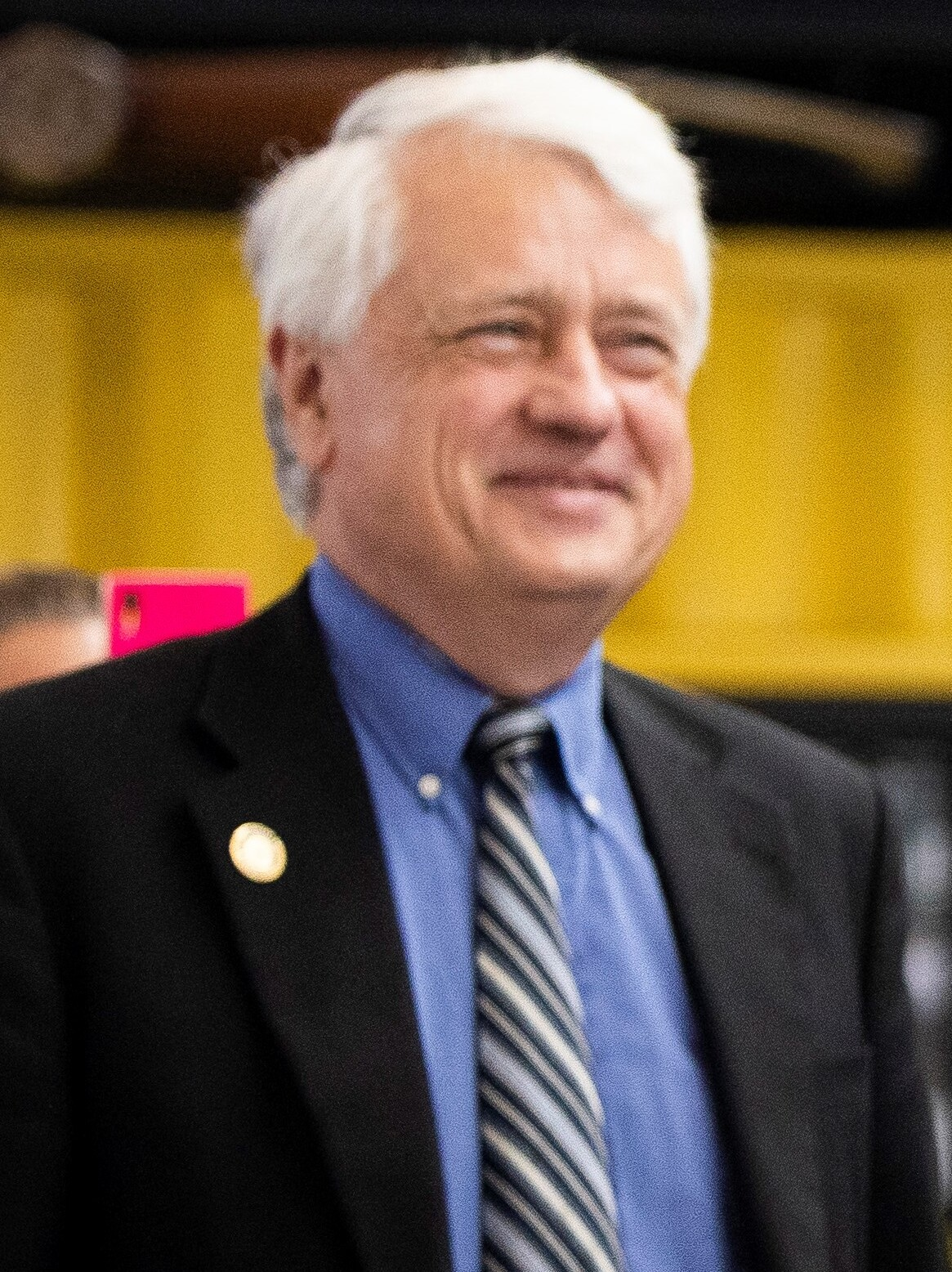
- Samuelson in 2021

Member of the Pennsylvania House of Representatives from the 135th district
- Incumbent
- Assumed office January 5, 1999
- Preceded by: Lisa Boscola

Personal details
- Born: September 21, 1960 (age 65)
- Party: Democratic
- Occupation: Politician
- Website: Steve Samuelson

Steven Samuelson (born September 21, 1960) is a Democratic member of the Pennsylvania House of Representatives. He was elected to his 13th term in November 2022 and is the chair of the Finance Committee.

== Early life ==
Samuelson is from Bethlehem, Pennsylvania. He attended Liberty High School as part of its class of 1978 and received a B.A. in Government from Lehigh University as part of their class of 1986. Samuelson served as legislative aide and clerk for the Lehigh County Commissioners board from 1989 to 1998. He also was a legislative aid to representatives Paul McHale and Karen Ritter.

== Pennsylvania House of Representatives ==
Samuelson was elected to the Pennsylvania House district 135 in 1998, taking office at the opening of the next legislative session in 1999. During his 23 years in office he has sponsored 578 bills. Some of his more notable bills include House Bill 1260 which he co-authored that increased the income limits for the PACENET program by $6,000 to increase access to prescription medicine for senior citizens. It is estimated that due to this expansion 20,000 more Pennsylvanians have access to the PACENET program. Additionally he authored House Bill 2560 which utilized a portion of left over COVID-19 relief money to increase rent rebate payments for an estimated 477,000 Pennsylvanians, mostly above the age of 65. Additionally Samuelson has been pivotal in securing funding for renovation projects in Bethlehem including a $500,000 grant to the National Museum of Industrial History, $30,000,000 to renovate the ruins of the Bethlehem Steel plant in the South Side, and $9,100,000 to renovate the Goodman Building.
