= Maxwell Frederic Coplan =

American photographer

Maxwell Frederic Coplan (February 13, 1912 – July 1, 1985) was an American photographer. His subjects included Bob Dylan, Alfred Hitchcock, Grace Kelly, Audrey Hepburn, Arthur Miller and Marilyn Monroe, as well as many other noted public figures of his time.

== Career ==
His work appeared in the pages and covers of Cosmopolitan, Life and Time Magazine among others.

Maxwell married Alice Coplan and they had two daughters, Nancy & Connie. He is survived by his daughters and three grandchildren, David Coplan Schneider, Scott Coplan Schneider and Catie Coplan Cannon. Maxwell trained his grandson, David Coplan Schneider in photography from the age of five. David is owner of Max Dawson Studio. Maxwell Frederic Coplan spent much time traveling with and capturing the Big Top Circus, Ringling Bros. and Barnum & Bailey Circus, often shooting with a Rolleiflex camera. Here's an excerpt from his book on the Circus, Pink Lemonade

"When Maxwell Coplan clicks his camera under "the big top" he gets as great a thrill as the kid who carries water for the elephants. In fact, the circus was responsible for his photographic career. Following his graduation from the Pennsylvania Museum's School of Industrial Art in Philadelphia, where he had been a scholarship student, he was commissioned to do a painting on a circus subject - just one day before the circus was to leave town.

Working against time, he borrowed a friend's camera and took several pictures of the circus under the friend's direction. He thumbtacked the best one alongside his easel and referred to it for detail. When his client came to see the work, he looked first at the painting, then at the photograph then at Coplan, and said, "We'll take the photograph instead of the painting - and we'll pay you the same price!"

Max had spent three weeks on the painting and 1/50th of a second taking the photograph, so he thought he was missing something. He went out and bought a camera identical to his friend's, and before long he was in New York working as a staff photographer on a national magazine. After almost a year in what he considered a rut, spring and the circus came along, and he ran away from his job and joined the circus. Many of the photographs in this book were taken then.

Since then, he has traveled internationally on assignments for many national magazines. Although he has flown thousands of miles in the past five years, photographing trapeze artists remain his primary focus.

Maxwell Frederic Coplan also published cover designs for The Literary Digest, from the late 1930s to 1960's.

An article entitled "Maxwell Coplan | The Human Touch" was published in the January–February 1958 edition of Print, a popular quarterly periodical of the time. The following is an excerpt from the article: "For those tired of the slick or superficial photographs so prevalent in today's advertising, Maxwell Coplan's honest, direct editorial photographs come as a welcome relief...The secret of Coplan's wide success is his bond of sympathy with the subject that comes through. In discussing the many people he has met as subjects for his camera, he never fails to be enthusiastic about them and his work.

Maxwell Coplan started to take pictures on an old Graphlex, bought in a pawn show on time payments, while still an art student. He now uses a reflex camera almost exclusively. Although he does studio work, he prefers shooting on location because he likes the challenge of the problems that evolve. This preference has sent him all over the world on assignments by leading magazines and national advertisers.

In 1945 he published a book on circus pictures, an early love, that has become something of a classic in his field.

Coplan recently had a retrospective exhibition of his work in the Westcott & Thomson Galleries, in Philadelphia, where his work was exceptionally well received."

"I rank Coplan with the very best photographers now taking pictures in America. His sense of open spaces in relation to foreground is one of his outstanding characteristics. I would call him an outdoor photographer with a keen sense of the dramatic and a most unusual and original feeling for design. His warm and transparent shadows and the strength of his black lift his pictures out of the ordinary realms of photography." - Manuel Komroff
