= William F. Coplan =

American politician

Member of the Pennsylvania Senate from the 18th district
- In office 1837–1842
- Preceded by: Samuel Leas Carpenter
- Succeeded by: James Xavier McLanahan

Personal details
- Born: c. 1795
- Party: Jackson Democrat

William F. Coplan was an American politician from Pennsylvania who served in the Pennsylvania State Senate, representing the 18th district for five years from 1837 to 1842 as a Jackson Democrat. During his tenure, the 18th district represented the counties of Fayette and Greene in Western Pennsylvania.

Coplan played an important part of the development of the National Road as, following an act of legislature from the Pennsylvania General Assembly on April 4, 1831, would be named one of the two commissioners of the Cumberland Road which would become the Pennsylvania stretch of the National Road.
