= Lisa Boscola =

American politician (born 1962)

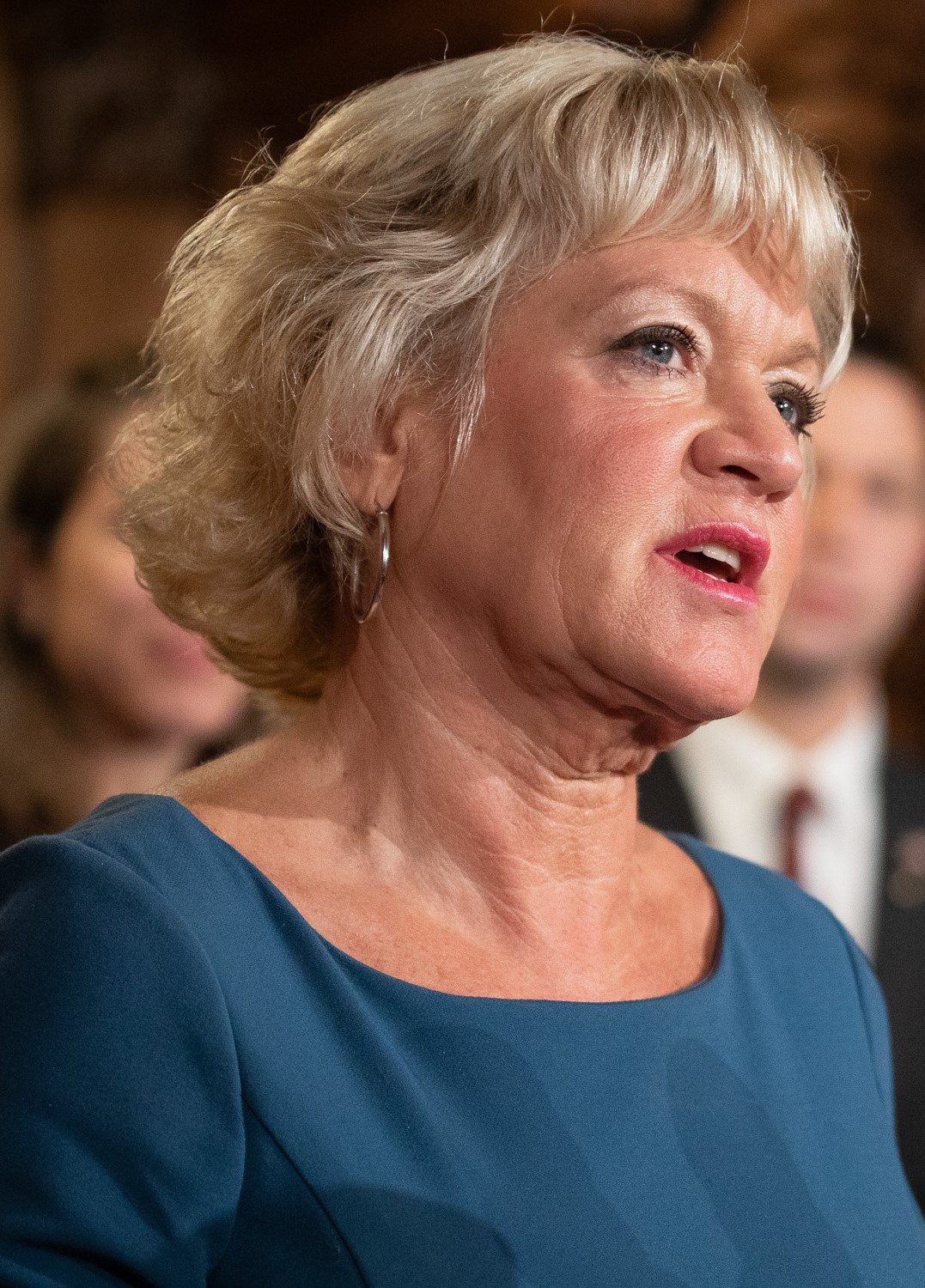

Member of the Pennsylvania Senate from the 18th district
- Incumbent
- Assumed office January 5, 1999
- Preceded by: Joseph Uliana

Member of the Pennsylvania House of Representatives from the 135th district
- In office January 3, 1995 – November 30, 1998
- Preceded by: Joseph Uliana
- Succeeded by: Steve Samuelson

Personal details
- Born: April 6, 1962 (age 64) Bethlehem, Pennsylvania
- Party: Democratic
- Other political affiliations: Forward (since 2023)
- Spouse: Edward Boscola
- Relatives: Darin Stofko
- Education: Villanova University
- Website: http://www.senatorboscola.com/

Lisa M. Boscola (born April 6, 1962) is an American politician from Pennsylvania currently serving as a Democratic member of the Pennsylvania State Senate, representing the 18th Senate District which includes portions of Lehigh and Northampton.

Boscola was born in Bethlehem, Pennsylvania to Richard and Anna Stofko. She is a graduate of Bethlehem's Freedom High School and Villanova University, from which she holds both a bachelor's degree and a master's degree in political science.

After college, she worked briefly as a court clerk before entering politics. From 1987 to 1993, Boscola was a Northampton County deputy court administrator. She first won a seat in the Pennsylvania House of Representatives in 1994 and served two terms. In 1998, she won a seat in the state senate and was re-elected in 2002, 2006, 2010, 2014, 2018, and 2022.

On June 21, 2023, Boscola along with fellow State Senator Anthony H. Williams announced they were affiliating with Andrew Yang's Forward Party, though they were not dropping their membership of the Democratic Party and the State Senate's Democratic caucus.

Boscola has on multiple occasions crossed party lines to vote in favor of banning transgender girls from female sports.

== Committee assignments ==
For the 2025–2026 Session Boscola sits on the following committees in the State Senate:

- Consumer Protection & Professional Licensure (Minority Chair)
- Banking & Insurance
- Communications & Technology
- Game & Fisheries
- Law & Justice

For the 2021–2022 Session Boscola served on the following committees in the State Senate:

- Banking & Insurance Committee
- Consumer Protection & Professional Licensure Committee
  - Minority Chair
- Community, Economic & Recreational Development Committee
- Environmental Resources and Energy
- Urban Affairs and Housing
