= Bobbin boy =

Term for child worker at a textile mill

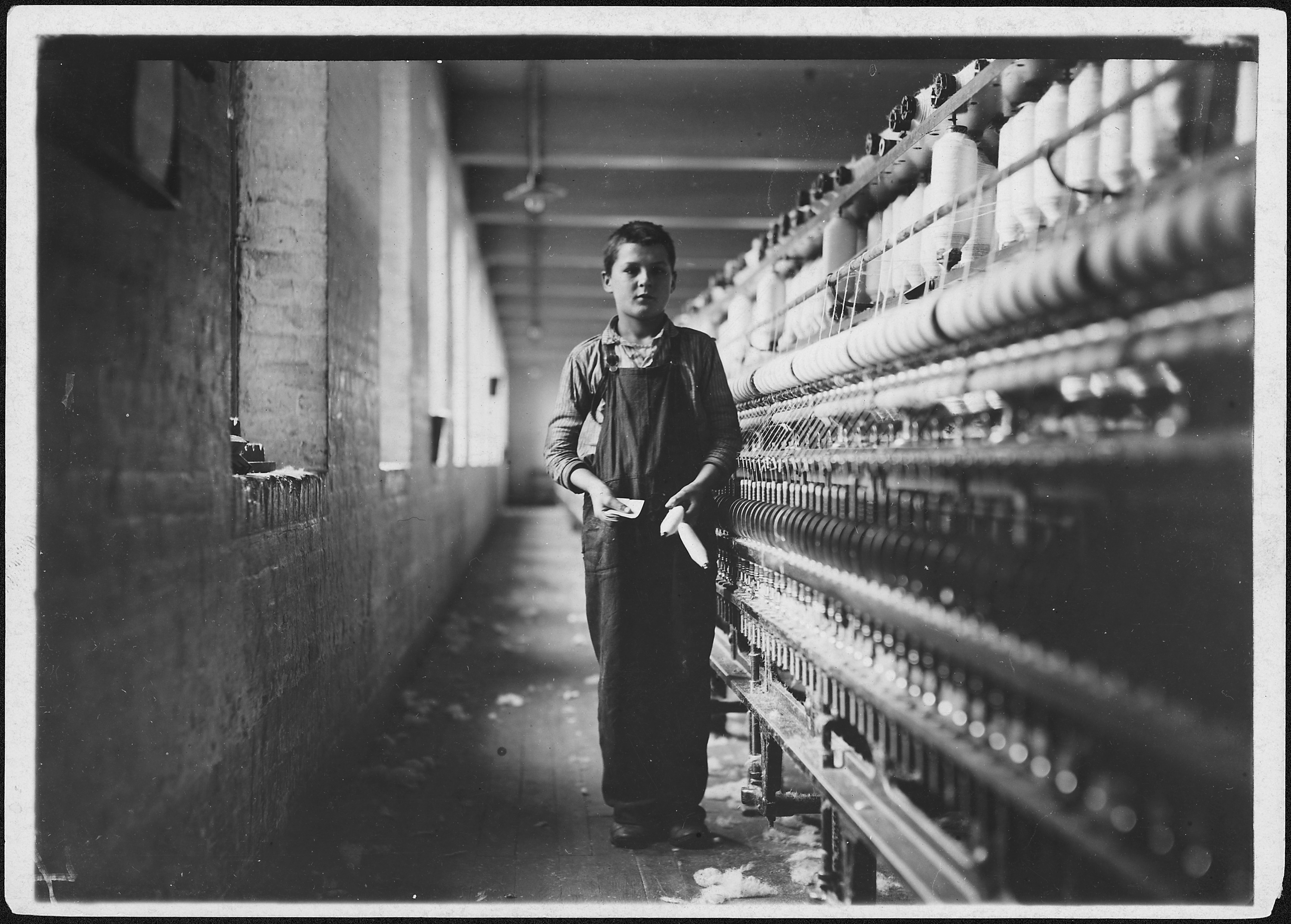
A bobbin boy in Chicopee, Massachusetts, 1911

A bobbin boy was a boy who worked in a textile mill in the 18th and early 19th centuries.

In the 18th and early 19th centuries, bobbin boys worked in textile mills. The boys brought bobbins to the women at the looms when they called for them, and collected the full bobbins of spun cotton or wool thread. They also would be expected to fix minor problems with the machines. Average pay was about $1.00 per week (equivalent to $39 in 2025), with days often beginning at 5:30 am and ending around 7:30 pm six days per week. The job as a bobbin boy was dangerous, and there was always an extreme risk of death.

== Notable bobbin boys ==
The following people once worked as a bobbin boy:

- Nathaniel Prentice Banks, Governor of Massachusetts and Union general
- Andrew Carnegie, steel tycoon
- Robert Frost, poet

== See also ==
- Doffer
