= Sheshequin, Pennsylvania =

Unincorporated community in Pennsylvania, U.S.

Coordinates: 41°51′19″N 76°29′27″W

Sheshequin is an unincorporated community in Bradford County, in the U.S. state of Pennsylvania.

== History ==
Sheshequin got its start as a Moravian mission in 1769. Sheshequin is a Native American name purported to mean "place of the rattle".

A post office was established at Sheshequin in 1810, and remained in operation until 1916.
