= St. Luke's University Health Network =

Health system in Pennsylvania and New Jersey

Coordinates: 40.60965°N 75.39251°W

- Industry: Healthcare, hospitals
- Founded: 1872; 154 years ago
- Headquarters: Bethlehem, Pennsylvania, U.S.
- Services: Teaching hospitals, Primary, secondary, and tertiary care centers; ambulatory clinics
- Number of employees: 21,000 (2025)
- Website: www.sluhn.org

St. Luke's University Health Network (SLUHN) is a non-profit health system based in Bethlehem, Pennsylvania. It includes 16 campuses and 350+ outpatient sites across Pennsylvania and New Jersey, employing more than 23,000 people as of 2025.

The network offers primary, secondary, and tertiary care and serves as a teaching and research institution through its affiliations with Temple University School of Medicine and other educational partners.

== History ==
SLUHN was founded in March 1872 to provide medical care to the region's industrial workforce, including employees of Bethlehem Steel. The first patient was admitted in 1873. Reverend Cortlandt Whitehead, Rector of the Episcopal Church of the Nativity in South Bethlehem, was instrumental in founding the hospital. With support from the Bishop Thorpe School in Fountain Hill, Tinsley Jeter helped secure the charter from the state legislature.

In 1875, the hospital moved to its current location in Fountain Hill. After philanthropist Asa Packer died in 1878, he left the hospital $300,000 in Lehigh Valley Railroad stock. The St. Luke's School of Nursing opened in 1884. It is the nation's oldest continuously operating nursing school.

The hospital expanded in the 1990s, acquiring Quakertown Community Hospital and Allentown Osteopathic Medical Center. It was reorganized as a hospital network in 1998. In 2006, a clinical campus of Temple University School of Medicine was established at St. Luke's Bethlehem, followed by the launch of a four-year medical school program in 2009.

SLUHN celebrated its 150th anniversary in 2022 and established a Pediatric Specialty Center, the Lehigh Valley’s first and only free-standing facility dedicated entirely to kids. Shortly thereafter, St. Luke’s 17-bed pediatric inpatient unit was renovated and relocated to include 24/7 hospitalist coverage, support from pediatric trained respiratory therapists and specialty trained pediatric nurses, pharmacists and pediatric surgeons.

In 2023, St. Luke's opened its Children's Hospital at the Bethlehem Campus. St. Luke’s also offers the region’s only pediatric dialysis center and the first and only pediatric specialty labs, designed to make children more comfortable and parents less stressed.

== Facilities ==
- St. Luke's Hospital - Allentown Campus - located in Allentown, Pennsylvania
- St. Luke's Hospital - Anderson Campus - located in Easton, Pennsylvania, is an Adult Level I Trauma Center.
- St. Luke's University Hospital - Bethlehem Campus - located in Bethlehem, Pennsylvania, is an Adult Level I Trauma Center. It is also home to St. Luke's Children's Hospital - Bethlehem and The Isaacman Family St. Luke’s Children’s Emergency Room.
- St. Luke's Hospital - Carbon Campus - located in Lehighton, Pennsylvania, is a Level IV Trauma Center.
- St. Luke's Hospital - Easton Campus - located in Easton, Pennsylvania
- Geisinger St. Luke’s Hospital - located in Orwigsburg, Pennsylvania, is a Level IV Trauma Center.
- St. Luke's Grand View Hospital - Sellersville - located in Sellersville, Pennsylvania, is a Level II Trauma Center.
- St. Luke's Lehighton Campus - located in Lehighton, Pennsylvania
- St. Luke's Hospital - Miners Campus - located in Coaldale, Pennsylvania, is a Level IV Trauma Center.
- St. Luke's Hospital - Monroe Campus - located in Stroudsburg, Pennsylvania, is a Level IV Trauma Center.
- St. Luke's Orthopedic Hospital - West End Campus - located in Allentown, Pennsylvania
- St. Luke's Penn Foundation Campus - located in Sellersville, Pennsylvania
- St. Luke's Quakertown Campus - located in Quakertown, Pennsylvania
- St. Luke's Hospital - Sacred Heart Campus - located in Allentown, Pennsylvania
- St. Luke's Hospital - Upper Bucks Campus - located in Quakertown, Pennsylvania, is a Level IV Trauma Center.
- St. Luke's Hospital - Warren Campus - located in Phillipsburg, New Jersey

== About ==
St. Luke's University Hospital is a non-profit, tertiary-care, teaching hospital.
