= Reading Prong =

Geologic formation in the United States

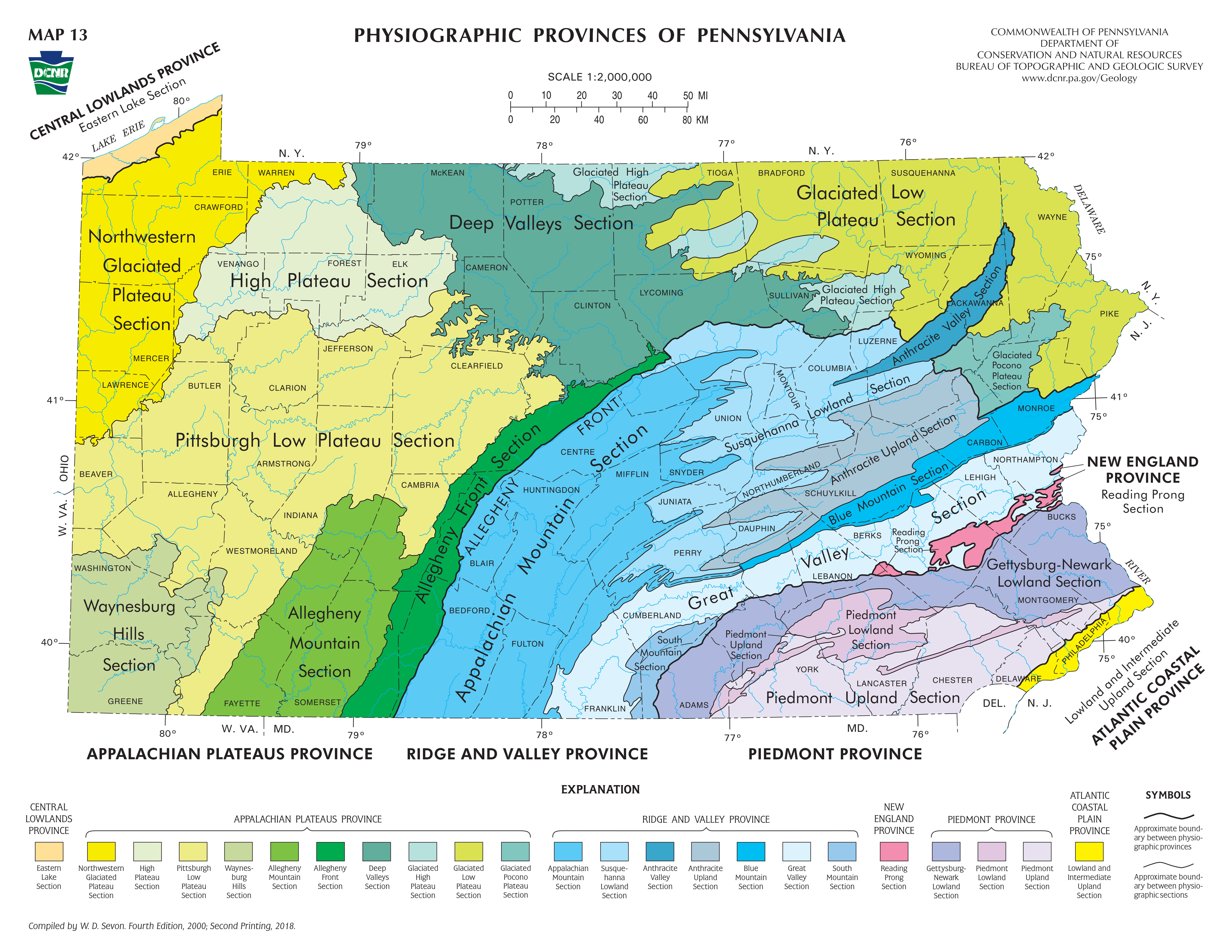
The location of the Reading Prong (shown in dark pink) in Pennsylvania

The Reading Prong is a physiographic subprovince of the New England Uplands section of the New England province of the Appalachian Highlands. The prong consists of mountains made up of crystalline metamorphic rock.

== Location ==
The Reading Prong stretches from near Reading, Pennsylvania, through the Lehigh Valley in eastern Pennsylvania northern New Jersey and into southern New York. It reaches its northern terminus in Connecticut.

In Pennsylvania, the Reading Prong is referred to as South Mountain while in New Jersey and New York the mountains of the subprovince are referred to as the New York – New Jersey Highlands. Near the Hudson Valley, the term Hudson Highlands is often used. The portion of the prong that enters Connecticut is known as the Housatonic Highlands.

== Relation to other divisions of the New England Uplands ==
There are two subsections of the New England Uplands in addition to the Reading Prong. A prong of the same rock belt extends from the Hudson Highlands south to New York City along the Hudson River. This region is often referred to as the Manhattan Prong. Staten Island Serpentinite is a southward extension of the New England Uplands.

== Geology ==
The Reading Prong is part of the Precambrian basement which is discontinuously exposed in the north-central Appalachians. The rocks that make up the prong consist of diverse gneisses. The New England Province and the Blue Ridge province share many geological similarities, and some experts consider the Reading Prong merely a continuation of the Blue Ridge Mountains, which reach their northern terminus at South Mountain near Harrisburg, Pennsylvania.

In the gap between the Blue Ridge and the Reading Province, the two mountainous regions descend into the Appalachian Piedmont. Together, the Blue Ridge province and the New England province are often referred to as the Crystalline Appalachians. Rocks of the Reading Prong are characterized by elevated concentrations of uranium, the decay of which produces gaseous radon, a potentially hazardous source of indoor contamination in structures constructed on the prong.

== Mountains of the Reading Prong ==
=== East Hudson Highlands (north to south) ===
- Sour Mountain
- Beacon Mountain
- Scofield Ridge
- North Sugarloaf
- Breakneck Ridge
- Bull Hill, aka Mt. Taurus
- South Redoubt and North Redoubt
- Sugarloaf Hill
- White Rock
- Canada Hill
- Anthony's Nose

=== West Hudson Highlands (north to south) ===
- Storm King Mountain
- Crow's Nest
- Popolopen Torne
- Bear Mountain
- West Mountain
- Bald Mountain
- Dunderberg Mountain

=== New Jersey Highlands (north to south) ===
- Pochuck Mountain
- Maple Hill
- Wawayanda Mountain
- Sterling Hill
- Hamburg Mountain
- Sparta Mountain
- Lookout Mountain
- Allamuchy Mountain
- Hackettstown Mountain
- Danville Mountain
- Watnong Mountain
- High Rock Mountain
- Jenny Jump Mountain
- Mount Mohepinoke
- Baldpate Mountain
- County House Mountain
- Mount No More
- Scotts Mountain
- Oxford Mountain
- Marble Mountain
- Upper Pohatcong Mountain
- Pohatcong Mountain
- Silver Hill
- Musconetcong Mountain

=== Reading Prong of Pennsylvania (north to south) ===
- Chestnut Hill
- Morgan Hill
- Hexenkopf Hill
- Christines Hill
- Pektor Hill
- Focht Hill
- Kirchberg
- Swoveberg
- Kohlberg
- Lehigh Mountain
- Saucon Hill
- Applebutter Hill
- South Mountain
- Mount Penn (Reading, Pennsylvania)
