= Focht =

Focht is a surname. Notable people with the surname include:

- Benjamin K. Focht (1863–1937), Republican member of the U.S. House of Representatives from Pennsylvania
- Dan Focht (born 1977), Canadian ice hockey defencemen
- Ivan Focht (1927–1992), Croatian and Bosnian Jewish philosopher and mycologist
- James Focht McClure Jr. (1931–2010), Judge of the United States District Court for the Middle District of Pennsylvania
- Matt Focht, American musician originally from Omaha, Nebraska

See also

- Focht Hill, a low mountain in Northampton County, Pennsylvania
