= Henry D. Heller =

American politician

Doctor Henry Detweiler Heller
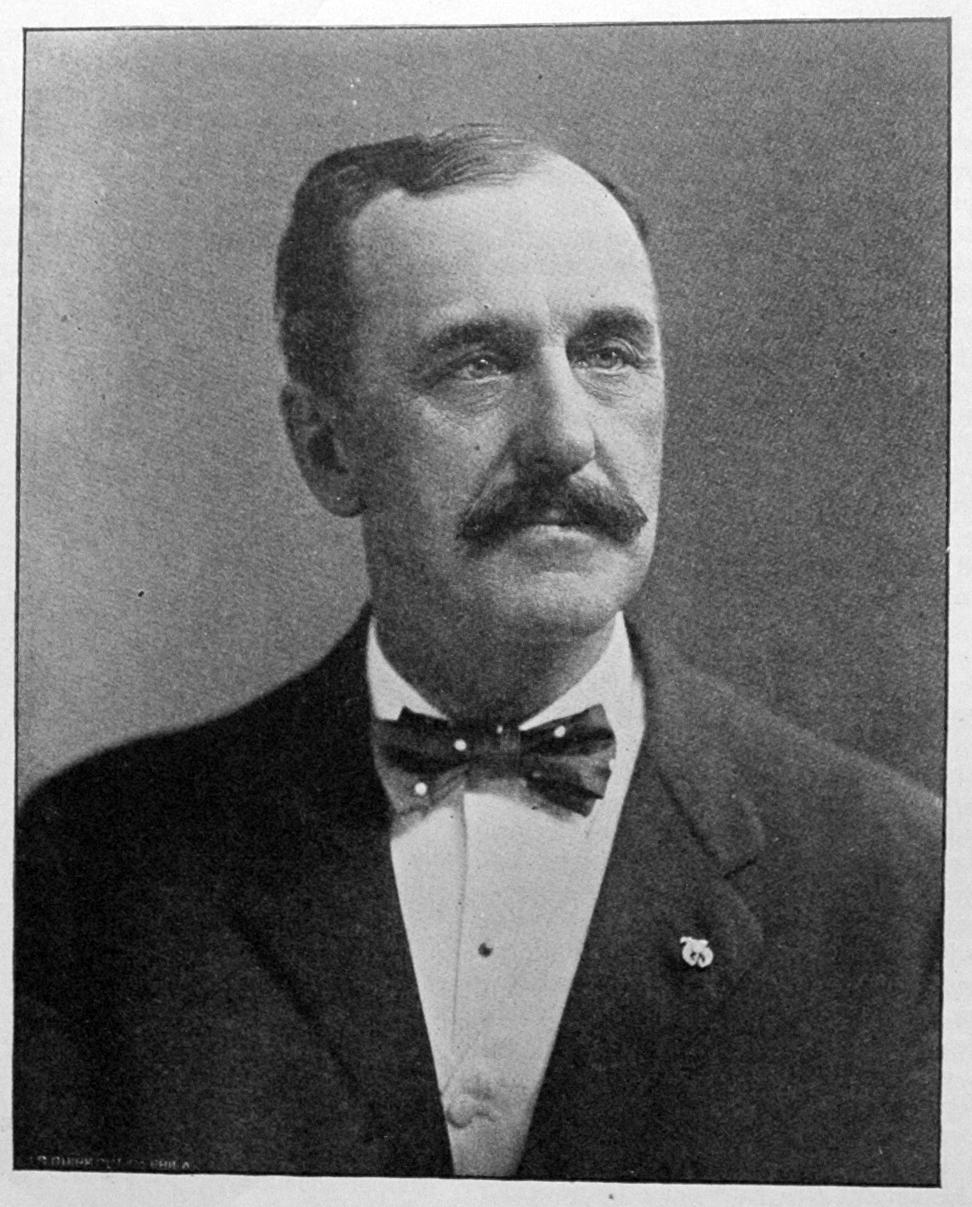

Member of the Pennsylvania Senate from the 18th district
- In office 1895–1898
- Preceded by: Edward Henry Laubach
- Succeeded by: Jacob B. Kemerer

Personal details
- Born: September 18, 1850 Hellertown, Pennsylvania
- Died: October 9, 1928 (aged 78)
- Party: Republican
- Spouse: Amanda C.S.Née Diehl
- Education: Claverack College; Bellevue Hospital Medical College
- Occupation: Doctor

Henry Detweiler Heller (1850–1928) was an American politician who served as a Republican in the Pennsylvania State Senate for one term from 1895 to 1898 representing Northampton County in the 18th district. Since the district's creation in 1875, he is just one of three Republicans to have held the office.

== Biography ==
Henry Detweiler Heller was born on September 18, 1850, in Hellertown, Pennsylvania to Christian Butz Heller and Henrietta Née Detweiller. His ancestors where the original settlers and the namesake of the borough. He attended Claverack College for his undergraduate and studied medicine at the Bellevue Hospital Medical College, now the New York University Grossman School of Medicine, graduating in 1871. He opened a medical practice in Hellertown until 1921. He was a member of the United States Medical Examining Board for four years, and was elected to the Hellertown board of trade in 1888. He was elected to the state senate in 1895 as a Republican, and would hold office until 1898. Afterwards he was named the State Quarantine Physician by Governor William A. Stone. He was a shareholder of the Thomas Iron Company and owned a limestone quarry. He married Amanda C.S.Née Diehl and died on October 9, 1928, at the age of 78. He is interred in the Union Cemetery in Hellertown.
