= Baldpate Mountain =

Baldpate Mountain may refer to:

- Baldpate Mountain (Maine)
- Baldpate Mountain (Warren County, New Jersey)
- Baldpate Mountain (Mercer County, New Jersey)
