= Kohlberg, Pennsylvania =

Mountain in Pennsylvania, United States

Kohlberg

Highest point
- Elevation: 971 ft (296 m) NGVD 29
- Coordinates: 40°33′51″N 75°18′06″W

Geography
- Location: Northampton County, Pennsylvania, U.S.
- Parent range: Reading Prong
- Topo map: USGS in Hellertown, Pennsylvania

Climbing
- Easiest route: Hiking

Kohlberg (from German: Kohle Berg, "Coal Mountain"), Coal Hill or Spring Hill is a low mountain in Northampton County, Pennsylvania. The main peak, which rises to 971 feet (296 m), is located in Lower Saucon Township between Hellertown and Springtown. A small portion of the mountain reaches into Springfield Township in Bucks County.

It is a part of the Reading Prong of the Appalachian Mountains.
