= Pektor Hill =

Mountain in Pennsylvania, United States

Highest point
- Elevation: 614 ft (187 m) NGVD 29
- Coordinates: 40°36′01″N 75°15′25″W

Geography
- Location: Northampton County, Pennsylvania, U.S.
- Parent range: Reading Prong
- Topo map: USGS Hellertown

Climbing
- Easiest route: Road

Pektor Hill is a low mountain in Northampton County, Pennsylvania. The main peak rises to 614 feet (187 m), and is located in southwestern Williams Township, to the south of Easton and south of Christines Hill.

It is a part of the Reading Prong of the Appalachian Mountains.
