= Swoveberg =

Mountain in Pennsylvania, United States

Highest point
- Elevation: 853 ft (260 m) NGVD 29
- Coordinates: 40°34′43″N 75°17′56″W

Geography
- Location: Northampton County, Pennsylvania, U.S.
- Parent range: Reading Prong
- Topo map: USGS in Hellertown, Pennsylvania

Climbing
- Easiest route: Hiking

Swoveberg (Swovenberg, from German: Schwaben Berg, "Swabia Mountain") is a low mountain in Northampton County, Pennsylvania in the Lehigh Valley region of eastern Pennsylvania. The main peak, which rises to 853 feet (260 m), is in Lower Saucon Township, east of Hellertown. Hellertown Reservoir adjoins the mountain to the south.

It is a part of the Reading Prong of the Appalachian Mountains.
