= Chestnut Hill (mountain) =

Mountain in Pennsylvania, US

Highest point
- Elevation: 722 ft (220 m) NGVD 29
- Coordinates: 40°43′02″N 75°11′49″W

Geography
- Location: Northampton County, Pennsylvania, U.S.
- Parent range: Reading Prong
- Topo map: USGS Easton

Climbing
- Easiest route: Road, Hiking

Chestnut Hill (Paxinosa Ridge, College Hill, Lafayette Hill or Mount Lafayette) is a low mountain in Northampton County, Pennsylvania. The main peak rises to 722 feet (220 m), and is located in Forks Township; the southern slopes extend into the City of Easton where it is known as College Hill in allusion to Lafayette College. The neighborhood within Forks Township on the northern slopes of the mountain is known as Chestnut Hill.

Chestnut Hill overlooks the Delaware River, and, with Marble Mountain on the New Jersey side, forms Weygadt Gap or the "Little Water Gap". The cliff overlooking Weygadt Gap is known as St. Anthony's Nose. Chestnut Hill adjoins the Great Appalachian Valley to the north at Frost Hollow.

It is part of the Reading Prong of the Appalachian Mountains.

== Toponymy ==
Chestnut Hill is named for the American chestnut tree, once prevalent in the area.
