= Kirchberg =

Kirchberg (German for "Church Hill") commonly refers to:

- Kirchberg, Luxembourg, a district of Luxembourg City, Luxembourg
  - Court of Justice of the European Union (metonym)

Kirchberg may also refer to:

== Austria ==
- Kirchberg am Wagram, a town in Lower Austria
- Kirchberg am Walde, a town in Lower Austria
- Kirchberg am Wechsel, a town in Lower Austria
- Kirchberg an der Pielach, a town in Lower Austria
- Kirchberg an der Raab, a town in Styria
- Kirchberg in Tirol, a town in Tyrol
- Kirchberg bei Mattighofen, a town in Upper Austria
- Kirchberg ob der Donau, a town in Upper Austria
- Kirchberg-Thening, a municipality in Upper Austria
- Kirchberg (Fontanella), a subdivision of Fontanella, Austria in Vorarlberg

== France ==
- Kirchberg, Haut-Rhin

== Germany ==
- Kirchberg an der Iller, in Biberach, Baden-Württemberg
- Kirchberg an der Murr, in Rems-Murr, Baden-Württemberg
- Kirchberg, a borough of Sulz am Neckar in Rottweil, Baden-Württemberg
- Kirchberg convent, a monastery in Sulz am Neckar, Baden-Wuerttemberg
- Kirchberg an der Jagst, in Schwäbisch Hall, Baden-Württemberg
- Kirchberg, Upper Bavaria, in the Erding, Bavaria
- Kirchberg im Wald, in Regen, Bavaria
- Kirchberg (Bensheim), a mountain in Bergstraße, Hesse
- Kirchberg, Rhein-Hunsrück, in Rhein-Hunsrück, Rhineland-Palatinate
  - Kirchberg (Verbandsgemeinde)
- Kirchberg, Saxony, in Zwickau, Saxony
- Kirchberg, fictional town in Erich Kästner's The Flying Classroom

== Romania ==
- Kirchberg or Chirpăr, a commune in Sibiu County

== Switzerland ==
- Kirchberg, Aargau, birthplace of Edmund Landolt
- Kirchberg, Bern, a municipality in Emmental, Bern
- Kirchberg, St. Gallen, a municipality Toggenburg, St. Gallen

== United States ==
- Kirchberg (Pennsylvania), a mountain

== See also ==
- Kilchberg (disambiguation)
