= Saucon Hill =

Mountain in Pennsylvania, United States

Highest point
- Elevation: 666 ft (203 m) NGVD 29
- Coordinates: 40°32′57″N 75°22′13″W

Geography
- Location: Lehigh County, Pennsylvania, U.S.
- Parent range: Reading Prong
- Topo map: USGS Hellertown

Climbing
- Easiest route: Road

Saucon Hill is a low mountain in Lehigh County, Pennsylvania. The main peak rises to 666 feet (203 m), and is located in Upper Saucon Township. Saucon Hill is located to the southwest of Hellertown.

It is a part of the Reading Prong of the Appalachian Mountains.
