= Ned D. Heindel =

American chemist (1937–2023)

- Born: September 4, 1937; Red Lion, York County, Pennsylvania, U.S.
- Died: June 27, 2023 (aged 85); Easton, Pennsylvania, U.S.
- Board member of: President of the American Chemical Society
- Awards: ACS fellow

Academic background
- Education: Lebanon Valley College, University of Delaware

Academic work
- Discipline: Chemistry
- Sub-discipline: Organic chemistry, medicinal chemistry
- Institutions: Lehigh University

Ned D. Heindel (September 4, 1937 – June 27, 2023) was an American chemist. He was the Howard S. Bunn Distinguished Professor Emeritus of Chemistry at Lehigh University, where he continued to do research. Heindel also worked as a medical research consultant. Heindel's research focused on diagnostic and therapeutic drug development. He served as president of the American Chemical Society in 1994, and has twice chaired the ACS Division for the History of Chemistry.

== Early life ==
Ned Duane Heindel was born on September 4, 1937, in Red Lion, York County, Pennsylvania, to Mr. and Mrs. Penrose H. Heindel. He earned a B.S. in chemistry from Lebanon Valley College (1959), and a master's degree (1961) and Ph.D. (1963) from the University of Delaware, where he worked with William A. Mosher. He did postdoctoral work at Princeton University in 1964 with Edward C. Taylor.

== Career ==
After teaching briefly at Ohio University and Marshall University Heindel joined the faculty at Lehigh University in 1966. He became a full professor by 1973, and was named the Howard S. Bunn Distinguished Professor of Organic Chemistry in 1976.

Heindel also served as a visiting professor of radiation oncology at Hahnemann University Hospital from 1971 to 2006, and as director of the Center for Health Sciences at Lehigh University from 1980 to 1987. He helped to establish the Lehigh-Hahnemann Cooperative Medical Education Program from 1992 to 2017 and was involved in Lehigh's distance education program.

He became professor emeritus in 2018. He continues to do research (e.g. healing burn wounds) and works as a medical research consultant.

=== Science ===
Heindel's research focuses on diagnostic and therapeutic drug development, including the areas of cancer research, nuclear medicine, diagnostic radioactive pharmaceuticals, chemotherapeutics and tumor-associated monoclonal antibodies. He has applied for at least 20 patents, with 14 issued. He has published more than 260 papers. A number of candidate pharmaceuticals from his lab have reached advanced animal trials.

He proved that psoralens and coumarins can be useful as photoactivated inhibitors of epidermal growth factor. Photosensitizers are used to treat epidermal proliferation, psoriasis and vitiligo. Heindel's lab has identified a new structural family of organic molecules which perform as light-activated anti-cancer compounds. After activation by ultraviolet light, lipophilic dipyranone (NDH2476) was found to inhibit abnormal Keratinocyte growth with an IC50 of 9 nanomolar concentration. NDH2476 acts through initial intercalation into DNA and when irradiated, “nicks” the polynucleotide and prevents subsequent unwinding. Gem di-methylation, double bond hydrogenation, or non-linear, angular geometry to the dipyranone greatly reduced or even eliminated the photo-cytotoxicity.

Heindel was one of the principal investigators in Project CounterACT-Rutgers, studying antidotes to sulfur mustard gas poisoning. Heindel's lab has developed an indomethacin prodrug, NDH4338, designed for use as a wound-healing accelerant for vesicant-triggered skin lesions. The drug is a trifunctional pharmaceutical composed of covalently linked inhibitors of COX-2, acetylcholinesterase, and induced nitric oxide synthase which can be released in vivo from the parent molecule. It has been tested on rodents pre-exposed to chloroethyl ethyl sulfide, nitrogen mustard, and sulfur mustard and has shown a marked acceleration of wound healing. While NDH4338 has several mechanisms of action, a principle one is suppression of mast cell degranulation in skin.

Hydroxamate compounds developed by Heindel's lab have been found to enhance corneal wound healing after mustard exposure. Compounds studied include olvanil OH (NDH4409) and retro olvanil 8 (NDH4417). Hydroxamates reduced the activity of ADAM17 and matrix metalloproteinases (MMPs), and attenuated expression of EMMPRIN, a tumor cell surface inducer of MMPs. This resulted in less epithelial sloughing, improved protection of the basement membrane zone, and better epithelial-stromal integrity after injury.

He served on the board of directors of the Pennsylvania Drug Discovery Institute, and the Scientific Advisory Board of Azevan Pharmaceuticals, Inc.

Heindel held a number of positions in the American Chemical Society (ACS), since first becoming a board member in 1985. In 1994, Heindel served as President of the ACS. In 2009 Heindel was named an ACS Fellow.

=== History ===
Heindel served on the board of directors of the National Foundation for History of Chemistry, and has twice been chairperson of the ACS Division of the History of Chemistry. Heindel has been credited with chairing a task force formed by the ACS in 1979 to consider the creation of a national center for the history of chemistry, but he himself credits John H. Wotiz with that chairmanship. In December 1981 the ACS approved the establishment of the Center for the History of Chemistry in Philadelphia. He was a contributor to a NOVA program about Percy Julian, “Forgotten Genius”, which aired in 2007.

He wrote both papers and books relating history and chemistry. Among his publications he has examined "The Professionalization of American Chemistry: How the German Ph.D. Model Crossed the Atlantic", and the careers of early photochemists such as Giacomo Ciamician.

Another area of interest is the medicinal chemistry and folk-healing techniques of the Pennsylvania Dutch. The Nineteenth Century Horse Doctor: A Pennsylvania Dutchman's Practical Guide to Treating Horses recognized the essential role of the horse in pre-industrial North American farming. Heindel and Robert D. Rapp translate and examine recipes in 19th century books of veterinary practice, or "Pferdartz", from the Moravian and the Pennsylvania Dutch traditions. Folk medicine cures ranged from herbs, minerals, poultices, and bleeding to incantations.

In Hexenkopf, History, Healing and Hexerei, he examines traditions of both white and black magic in the Wilhelm and Saylor families of Northampton County, Pennsylvania. Healers such as Johann Peter Seilor and Emanuel Wilhelm used tonics, personalized prescriptions and manipulations to treat sickness and fight off evil in the tradition of white magic or "Braucherei". Modern pharmaceutical science has examined the use of some of their treatments such as poke root and mayapple root. Traditions of black magic have focused on Hexenkopf Rock.

Heindel and his wife Linda (Heefner) Heindel were active in historical groups in the Lehigh Valley and frequently contribute to Pennsylvania Folklife Magazine. Heindel has lectured on social relationships between Europeans, Lenni Lenape, and Shawnee in the Durham area in the 1700s. He is interested in the work of the Buckwampum Historical and Literary Society, a group that met from 1888 to 1903. Most were amateurs but archaeologist Henry Mercer was also a member. The group conducted several digs in Bucks County, Pennsylvania, and Northampton County, Pennsylvania.

== Land conservation ==
Over a 50 year period, Ned and Linda Heindel have purchased and preserved 128 acres of "forest, bogs and meadows" around the stone farmhouse in which they live, in Williams Township, Northampton County, Pennsylvania. The hilly area includes stands of ash, poplar and oak trees, wild azalea, freshwater springs and Hexenkopf Rock, a ridge of exposed Precambrian stone. Linda Heindel serves as the secretary of the Land Preservation Board of Williams Township, Northampton County, PA.

As of August 2014, a consortium of energy companies announced plans to build the PennEast Pipeline to carry natural gas from the Marcellus Shale in Pennsylvania into New Jersey. Ned and Linda Heindel are among residents who would be affected.

Beginning on February 6, 2018, the PennEast Pipeline Co. has filed eminent domain notices in federal court to take possession of rights of way on the lands of those who have not agreed to the pipeline. Those who received eminent domain notices include at least 129 New Jersey landowners and 50 Pennsylvania landowners, among them the Heindels. The Heindels are active opponents of the proposed pipeline and the attempted seizure of their land under eminent domain.

== Death ==
Heindel died on June 27, 2023, at the age of 85.

== Awards ==
- 2011, Hillman Faculty Award, Lehigh University, for educational and research achievements
- 2009, Fellow, American Chemical Society
- 2002, Ben Franklin Partnership Award for Corporate Assistance
- 1997, Henry Hill Award for Achievements in Medicinal Chemistry, NOBCChE
- 1996, Harry and Carol Mosher Award for Contributions to Chemistry, ACS
- 1989, Brady Cancer Achievement Award, Brady Cancer Research Foundation, for research in tumor-imaging radiopharmaceuticals
- 1978, Briody Award
- 1969, Robinson Award

== Sources ==
- American men & women of science, 1995-96 : a biographical directory of today's leaders in physical, biological and related sciences. Vol. 3 (19th ed.). New Providence, New Jersey: R. R. Bowker. 1996. pp. 739–740. ISBN 978-0835234665.
