= Zucksville, Pennsylvania =

Community in Pennsylvania, US

Coordinates: 40°43′07″N 75°14′40″W

Zucksville is an unincorporated community in Forks Township in Northampton County, Pennsylvania. It is located along the east side of the Bushkill Creek, northwest of Easton.

Zucksville is part of the Lehigh Valley metropolitan area, which had a population of 861,899 and was the 68th-most populous metropolitan area in the U.S. as of the 2020 census. It uses the Easton ZIP Code of 18040.
