= Chestnut Hill, Northampton County, Pennsylvania =

Community in Pennsylvania, US

Chestnut Hill, Pennsylvania
- Census-designated place
- Location of Chestnut Hill in Pennsylvania Chestnut Hill (the United States)
- Coordinates: 40°43′21″N 75°12′22″W
- Country: United States
- State: Pennsylvania
- County: Northampton
- Township: Forks

Area
  - Census-designated place: 3.07 sq mi (7.94 km^{2})
  - Land: 3.03 sq mi (7.85 km^{2})
  - Water: 0.035 sq mi (0.09 km^{2})
- Elevation: 310 ft (94 m)

Population (2020)
  - Census-designated place: 6,689
  - Density: 2,206.1/sq mi (851.78/km^{2})
  - Metro: 865,310 (US: 68th)
- Time zone: UTC-5 (Eastern (EST))
  - Summer (DST): UTC-4 (EDT)
- ZIP Code: 18040 (Easton)
- Area codes: 610 and 484
- FIPS code: 42-13336
- GNIS feature ID: 2805581

Chestnut Hill is an unincorporated community and census-designated place (CDP) in Northampton County, Pennsylvania, United States. It was first listed as a CDP prior to the 2020 census. Its population as of the 2020 census was 6,689. It is part of the Lehigh Valley metropolitan area, which had a population of 861,899 and was the 68th-most populous metropolitan area in the U.S. as of 2020.

Chestnut Hill is on the eastern edge of Northampton County, in the southeastern quadrant of Forks Township. It is bordered to the south by the city of Easton and to the east by the Delaware River, which forms the Pennsylvania–New Jersey border. It is bordered to the west by Sullivan Trail (old Pennsylvania Route 115), which leads northwest 4 miles (6 km) to Stockertown. Pennsylvania Route 611 follows the Delaware River along the eastern edge of Chestnut Hill, leading south into Easton and northeast 17 miles (27 km) to Portland.

Chestnut Hill is a 719-foot-high (219 m) ridge which runs along the southern border of the CDP, overlooking the Delaware River.

Historical population
Census	Pop.	Note	%±
2020	6,689		—
U.S. Decennial Census
