= Kilchberg (Tübingen) =

Small village in germany

Coordinates: 48°29′20″N 9°00′57″E

Kilchberg is a village within the administrative district of Tübingen. Kilchberg is located 2.6 miles (4.2 km) south west of the city center, and is situated along the south bank of the Neckar River in Baden-Württemberg, Germany. The municipality of Kilchberg was incorporated into the university city of Tübingen on July 1, 1971.

== Origin of name ==
The name Kilchberg is unique in Germany as a place name. In Northern Switzerland there are two places also called Kilchberg, located in Basel and Zürich cantons respectively. All three are located in areas where Alemannic German dialects are spoken.

The word Kilchberg is ambiguous in its origin and meaning. If broken down to its component parts “kilch” and “berg,” the latter part is common and having a meaning of mountain or hill in German. The former part “kilch” is not so highly attested. Kilch is the common name in southern Germany for various species of European freshwater whitefish, such as Coregonus bavaricus (endangered), and Coregonus gutturosus (extinct). These fish are also commonly known as kilchen, and kirchfisch (church fish). The name Kilchberg can thus mean “salmon hill/mountain.”

There is also the probability of another meaning for Kilchberg, based on the ambiguity and apparent interchangeability of the words “Kilch” and “Kirch” in some Old High German and medieval sources. “Chirihha” and “chilihha” respectively, represent the same word in OHG, meaning “church.” Another name, mentioned above, for the kilch is kirchfisch aka churchfish. This would then give an alternate meaning “church hill/mountain” for Kilchberg.

One other possible origin for the name Kilchberg is from the German word “kelch.” Kelch is German for “chalice” or goblet. Located on the outskirts of the village is a prominent Celtic burial mound dating from the Hallstatt culture, about 500 BCE. The mound stands about 2.5 meters high, encircled with stone at the bottom, and on the top features a sandstone stelae approximately one meter high. To the casual observer this may be easily perceived as a hill resembling an upside-down chalice. In the relatively flat plains of the Neckar river valley this ancient mound, located in Kilchberg, may be reckoned a “Kelchberg” or “chalice hill/mountain.” More evidence would need to come to light to have a definitive origin of the name.

== History ==
Kilchberg was a small rural farming village that sprang up in the Middle Ages around a moted stone castle, Schloss Kilchberg. It is not known who the builder of the castle was or what family first governed the village and its stronghold. It isn't until the middle of the 13th century that we have a detailed account of Kilchberg and its nobility. The ancient nobility were considered “Uradel Niederadelich” [ancient lesser nobility] and were generally “Freiherren” [barons]. Later some became known as “Reichsritter” [knights of the realm], or Free Imperial Knights. It is also not known how the nobility of this village and its environs maintained their free holding status, subject only to the German Kings/Emperors, as the powerful Counts of Tübingen, Hohenberg, and the Counts of Württemberg surrounded Kilchberg.

== 1100 Hiltrud von Kilchberg ==
Kilchberg is first mentioned in the written record on a document found in the chronicles of the Zwiefalten Abbey dated to the year 1100 CE. This was in reference to a noble woman named “Hiltrud von Kilchberg” who resided at the monastery for a time. This reference to Kilchberg and its leading family stands alone in the year 1100.

== 1236–1244 Heinrich “de Kirchperc” ==
The next time Kilchberg is mentioned, in the extant record, is 136 years later. In 1236 a “Heynrikus de Kirchperc” signed as a witness to the marriage of Adelheid, Count Wilhelm von Tübingen's daughter. In 1240, as a witness to a document concerning the exchange of property between parties under the authority of Count Wilhelm von Tübingen, is one “Heinricus de Kirchperc.” On March 24, 1244, the same person was a witness to a similar document for Wilhelm of Tübingen, this time as “h. de kirchperc.” Here it seems the nobility in Kilchberg was in the administrative service to the Counts of Tübingen.

== 1261–1437 Lescher von Kilchberg Family ==
The next mention of Kilchberg is, again, in connection with the ruling family of Kilchberg being in the administrative service of the Counts of Tübingen. At this time the nobility of Kilchberg had assumed the surname “Lescher”. It is not known if this family, calling themselves “Lescher von Kilchberg,” is from the same family of the above-mentioned Heinrich “de Kirchperc.” This is probable due to Onomastics, the span of only 17 years, and their positions as administrative servants to Tübingen. However, until more evidence is discovered this earlier family connection will remain unanswered. The following is a chronological summary of the Lescher von Kilchberg family:

1261, September 1: A “Fredericus Lescharius” of Kilchberg is a witness to a document of sale of Count Rudolf von Tübingen. [The Count of Tübingen has also acquired the surname “der Schere.”]

1292, October 25: Friedrich and Heinrich Lescher with their sister Tilia sell and pledge various property and possessions to the nuns of Stettin Abbey in Hechingen. Shown: “Fredericus de Kilchperch dictus Lescher.”

1302: Compensation of Dyen von Gomaringen was paid to “Heinzen der Lescher von Kilchberg.”

1302: The Knights “Heinrich der Lescher” and his “father of the same name” are noted in a document as administrators for Count Gotfried von Tübingen. [Note the likelihood that Heinrich's father Heinrich could be that of the earlier “Heinrich de Kirchperc”]

1307: “Heinrich der Lescher von Kilchberg” foregoes a claim to the vineyards in Ammern.

1312: “Heinrich Lescher” is a witness to a document of sale for Gotfried von Tübingen.

1333, April 29: “Heinrich der Lescher von Kilchberg” sells a meadow in Kilchberg and a garden in Weilheim.

1342: Lady “Clare Lescherin” with her two sons “Rüdiger und Cuntz” [Conrad] sells two meadows of Kilchberg.

1368, April 2 [Saint Urban's Day]: “Rüdiger Lescher,” in conjunction with his brother Conrad and his son-in-law Ulrich Majer von Wassneck, establishes the “Löwenweissen” [Lion Manor?] in Kilchberg.

1370: In a letter of purchase “Kunzen der Lescher” [Conrad] with his wife Adelheid [von Nehren], purchases the vineyard near Spitzberg.

1370, July 20: Count Rudolf von Hohenberg mediates a dispute between “Rüdiger Lescher von Kilchberg” and Claus Wanken von Wankenheim.

1375: “Rüdiger Lescher” of Kilchberg receives an armorial grant, Coat of arms.

1379, June 27: Count Rudolf von Hohenberg and “Ritter Rüdiger der Lescher von Kilchberg” witness the sale of a vineyard in Halden to [Rüdiger's son-in-law] Ulrich Majer von Wassneck.

1389: “Konrad, son of Rüdiger Lescher von Kilchberg,” is arrested and jailed on charges of “Highway robbery.” He swears an oath that he will harm Württemberg no more. He is released, set into fife and mandated to pay over to Count Eberhard von Württemberg certain acreages of land in Kilchberg as well as a share of his total crop yields.

1393, July 3: Eberhard III, Count of Württemberg called "the Mild", relieves “the noble Knight Konrad der Lescher” of his promised payments and lands of Kilchberg, and is relieved of these obligations.

1411, May 30: “Konrad Lescher” administers a sale of property for his stepsons, Ruf [Rudolf] and Wolf von Ehingen, on their behalf.

1413: “Conrat Lescher von Kilchberg” witnesses a document for Marklin von Owe.

1414, Dec 13: “Konrad Lescher von Kilchberg” sells a house on the Neckar River to a citizen of Tübingen.

1416, September 19: “Konrad Lescher” [von Kilchberg] witnesses and is a Guarantor for the large inheritance of his stepsons Rudolf and Wolf von Ehingen from their uncle Hugo von Ehingen.

1436, April 23: A marriage decree in Waiblingen certifies the marriage of “Elizabeth Lescherin von Kilchberg,” daughter of “Konrad Lescher,” to Konrad von Hofen.

1437: A letter of purchase states that [Konrad's sons] “Ludwig” and his brother “Conrad Lescher von Kilchberg” sell to Rudolf von Ehingen [their half or stepbrother] one fourth of their holdings in Kilchberg. [Including the castle]

In these early references it is seen that Kilchberg was under the lordship of the Lescher family from before 1261 [probably earlier than 1236] until the year 1437. During this 200-year period the records indicate Kilchberg's nobility changed allegiances from time to time as the political climate dictated. In the beginning Kilchberg was in the occasional employ of the Counts of Tübingen for over a century. In 1342 the Palatine Counts of Württemberg purchased the countship of Tübingen. After this year the Lescher family of Kilchberg is then found in the employ of the Counts of Hohenberg. They remained in allegiance with the Hohenbergs until the death of Rudolf III in 1389, when Hohenberg was absorbed into the Habsburg dynasty of Austria. It was in this year we find that parts of Kilchberg were enfeoffed under Württemberg for a time. About 1400 the Lescher von Kilchberg family began a close relationship with the wealthy local von Ehingen family. Konrad Lescher married a widowed mother of this family, and became the guardian of her young children. After Konrad Lescher died his sons Ludwig and Konrad III Lescher sold Kilchberg and its Castle and with these their lordship. After the year 1437 we hear of only the von Ehingen family in Kilchberg.

== 1437–1608 von Ehingen zu Kilchberg Family ==
In 1437 Kilchberg passed to the von Ehingen family. Rudolf von Ehingen, the son of Burkhard “mit dem Zopf” or “with the Tuft” von Ehingen and his wife Luckgarten von Ischlingen (who in widowhood later married Konrad Lescher von Kilchberg between 1406 and 1410), purchased the lordship and castle of Kilchberg from his half or stepbrothers Ludwig and Konrad Lescher. Rudolf von Ehingen inherited a substantial number of properties and amounts of goods and income first from the death of his father in 1405, and then in 1416 Rudolf and his brother Wolf became the heirs to their childless uncle Hugo von Ehingen's fortune. When Rudolf's younger brother Wolf died prematurely in 1425 he inherited his share also. As a young man Rudolf allied himself strongly with the Counts of Württemberg. After the death of Eberhard IV, Count of Württemberg, he was in favor with the count's widow, Henriette, Countess of Montbéliard [Mömpelgard in German], and was placed on the so-called Regentschaftsrat (Regency Council) for her under-age children. As such Rudolf von Ehingen zu Kilchberg was a mentor for the future Ludwig I, Count of Württemberg-Urach and Ulrich V, Count of Württemberg. Many years later, after the death of Count Louis III in 1450, Rudolf was for a time regent of the young Eberhard I, Duke of Württemberg. After Rudolf's death (after 1463), Kilchberg passed to his son Jörg von Ehingen (1428 - February 24, 1508). Jörg (George) is made famous by the publishing of his diary, which was a record of his adventures and travels to the various high courts of Europe. He also helped found the University of Tübingen in 1477. The von Ehingen family expanded and enlarged the castle and its grounds. Several generations later George John von Ehingen of Kilchberg and his wife Maria Magdalena von Preysingen had no male heirs at the time of his death in 1608. The ownership of Kilchberg then went to his daughter, Magdalena von Ehingen zu Kilchberg in her own right, and by proxy to her husband. She had married Hans Urban von Closen zu Heidenburg. It was their von Closen descendants who then inherited Kilchberg.

== 1608–1721 von Closen zu Kilchberg Family ==
Freiherr George Ludwig von Closen zu Kilchberg (grandson of George John von Ehingen) next inherits Kilchberg.

== 1721–1779 Leutrum von Ertingen zu Kilchberg Family ==
Ernst Friedrich Leutrum von Ertingen purchased Kilchberg in 1721. He was a member of the Neckar-Schwarzwald knights, and a member of Knightly Society of St. Jörg Schild.

== 1779–1806 von Tessin zu Kilchberg Family ==
Noble family originally from the village of Tessin in the district of Bad Doberan, Mecklenburg-Western Pomerania, in Northern Germany. This family became the Freiherren [Free Lords] of Kilchberg in 1779, through the marriage of Johann Ferdinad II von Tessin of Hochberg to Anne Philippine Elizabeth Leutrum on 29 Nov. 1755, the daughter and heiress of Ernst Friedrich Leutrum von Ertingen of Kilchberg. Upon her father's death in 1762, Kilchberg passed to Anne Philippine and by proxy to her husband of the von Tessin family. She and her husband had children, but their son predeceased them in 1775. Upon Anne Philippine's death on May 13, 1779, Kilchberg passed to her husband. Shortly after her death Johann Ferdinad II von Tessin of Kilchberg remarried to Sophie Friederike Dorothea von Woellwarth. They had five children, and Kilchberg eventually passed their youngest son Christian Wilhelm von Tessin of Kilchberg. Presently, Christian's descendants still own and occupy the castle of Kilchberg.

1806–1919 Kilchberg under Kingdom of Württemberg and German Reich

1919–1971 Kilchberg under Weimar Republic, Third Reich, and Federal Republic of Germany

1971–present Kilchberg (Tübingen)
