= Edward Henry Laubach =

American politician

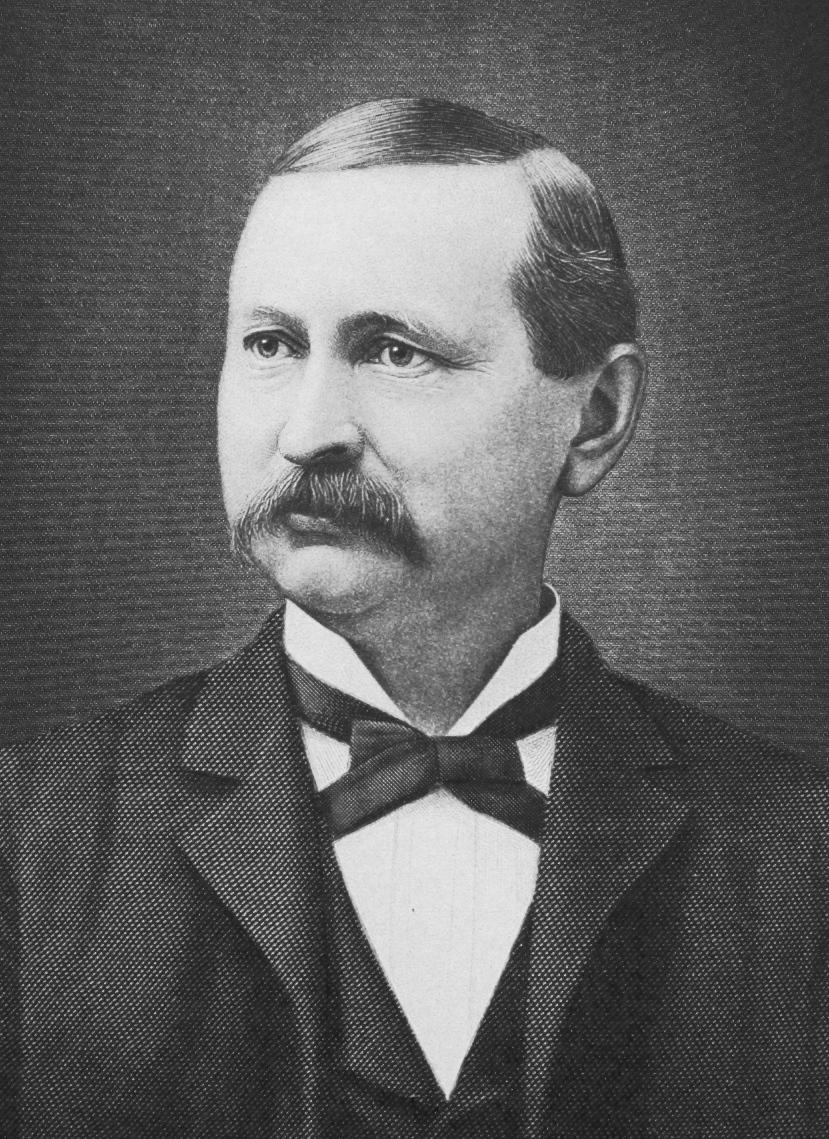

Member of the Pennsylvania Senate from the 18th district
- In office 1891–1896
- Preceded by: Jacob Dachrodt
- Succeeded by: Henry D. Heller

Personal details
- Born: September 1, 1852 Northampton, Pennsylvania
- Died: April 10, 1916 (aged 63) Northampton, Pennsylvania
- Party: Democratic
- Spouse: Elizabeth née Stewart
- Children: Mabel S. Laubach Nagel; Samuel Townsend Laubach; James Howard Laubach
- Education: Allentown Seminary; Franklin & Marshall College
- Occupation: Merchant

Edward Henry Laubach (1852–1916) was an American politician who served as a Democrat in the Pennsylvania State Senate for two terms from 1891 to 1896 representing Northampton County in the 18th district.

== Biography ==
Edward Henry Laubach was born on September 1, 1852, in Northampton, Pennsylvania to Samuel Laubach and Lucy A. née Hess. He received a public school education before attending the Allentown Seminary, but graduated from Franklin & Marshall College. He managed his fathers mercantile business until he became president of the Northampton Brewing Company. He was then elected to the Northampton County Democratic Committee and the Pennsylvania Democratic Committee. He served as Northampton's school board director before being elected to the state senate, serving from 1891 to 1896. He became the first ever state senator from Northampton county to win reelection in 1895, but would be unseated by Republican Henry D. Heller the following election. He married Elizabeth née Stewart and the couple had three children, Mabel S. Laubach Nagel, Samuel Townsend Laubach, and James Howard Laubach.

Edward Henry Laubach died at his home in Northampton on April 10, 1916, at the age of 63.
