= Kilchberg =

Kilchberg may refer to the following places:

== In Switzerland ==
- Kilchberg, Basel-Landschaft
- Kilchberg, Zürich

== In Germany ==
- Kilchberg (Tübingen), a part of Tübingen

== See also ==
- Kirchberg (disambiguation)
