= Lost River Caverns =

Cave in Pennsylvania, United States

- Rentzeimer's Cave; Lost Cave
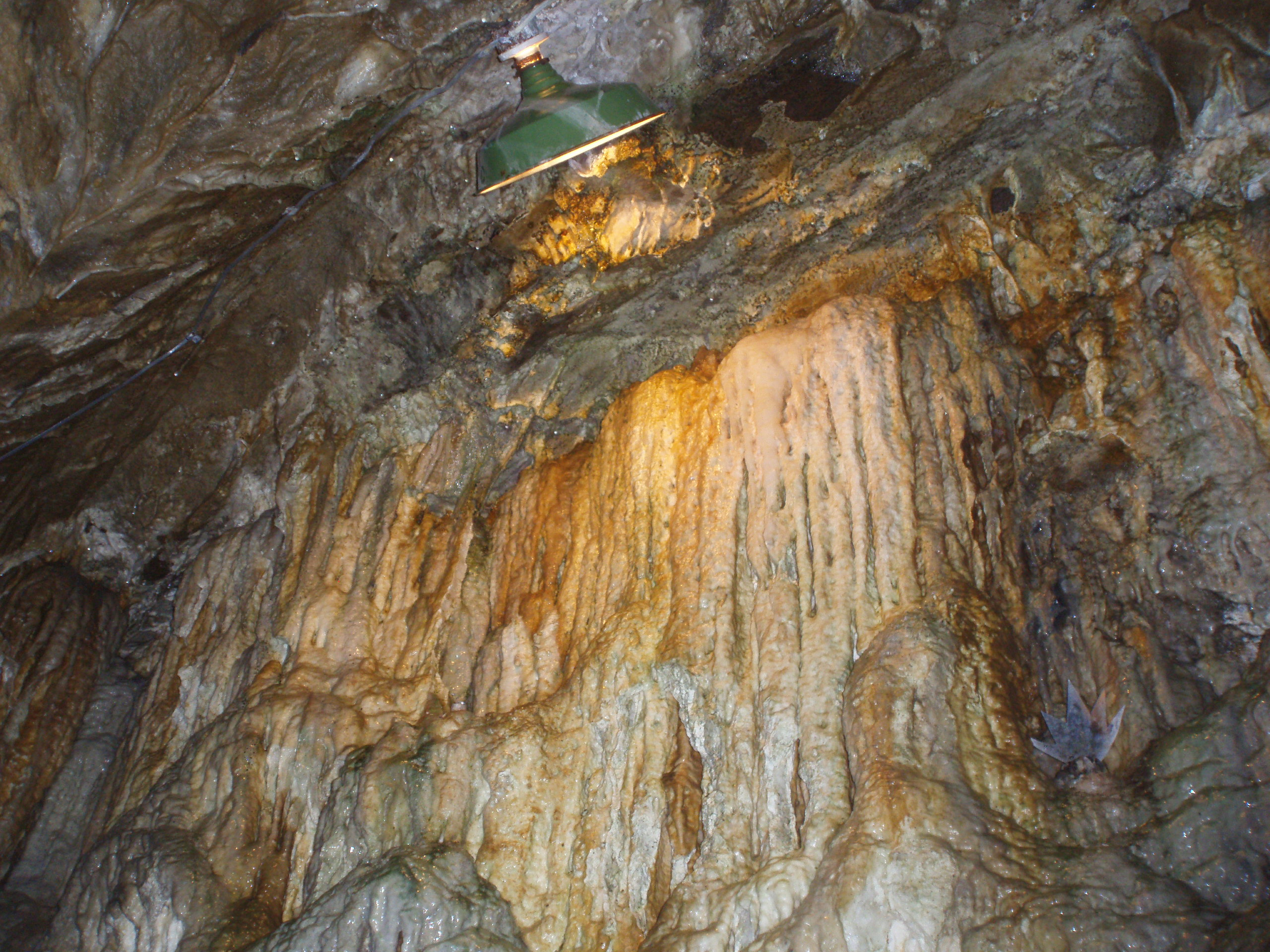
- Lost River Caverns
- Interactive map of Lost River Caverns
- Location: Hellertown, Pennsylvania, U.S.
- Coordinates: 40°34′51″N 75°19′51″W
- Depth: 80 ft (24 m)
- Length: 1,200 ft (370 m)
- Discovery: 1883
- Geology: Limestone
- Entrances: 1
- Difficulty: easy
- Hazards: occasionally rocks are slippery
- Access: Fee

Lost River Caverns is a natural limestone cavern located on the east side of Hellertown, Pennsylvania, United States, and consisting of five chambers. The caverns were formed by the karstification or dissolving of the limestone by water. In the past the caverns have been called Rentzheimer's Cave and Lost Cave. The "Lost River", so named because the source and mouth of the river have not yet been discovered, flows through it. The temperature in the cave is consistently close to 52 °F (11 °C). There is a gift shop and a museum before the entrance.

It was discovered in 1883 when a limestone quarry cut into it. It is open to the public.
