= Jeremiah S. Hess =

American politician (1843–1928)

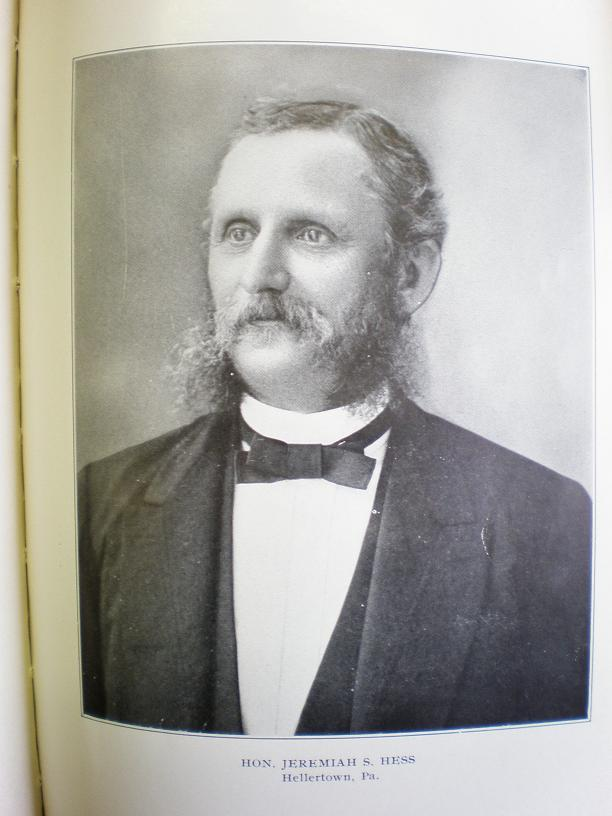
- Senate portrait

Member of the Pennsylvania Senate from the 18th district
- In office 1883–1886
- Preceded by: William Beidelman
- Succeeded by: Jacob Dachrodt

Hellertown Town Council

Hellertown Chief Burgess

Personal details
- Born: December 3, 1843 Hellertown, Pennsylvania
- Died: March 29, 1928 (aged 84)
- Party: Democratic
- Spouse: Tillie Née Henninger
- Children: Herbert H. Hess; Clara Hess; Mary L. Hess; Samuel Hess
- Education: Allentown Seminary; Franklin & Marshall College

Jeremiah S. Hess was an American politician who served in the Pennsylvania Senate for the 18th district representing Northampton County as a Democrat.

== Biography ==
Jeremiah S. Hess was born on December 3, 1843, in Hellertown, Pennsylvania to Reverend Samuel Hess, an influential local political figure, and Lucretia Klein Hess. He attended public school in Bethlehem and Allentown before attending the Allentown Seminary, being a member of Phi Beta Kappa. He attended Franklin & Marshall College earning a master's degree in the arts.

Shortly after his graduation, Hess was employed in various trades. Including as a teacher at his alma mater, the Allentown Seminary in 1862 before attending the Mercersburg seminary in 1865. He then attended lectures in universities in Berlin, Bonn, and Tubingen but would be forced to abandon his theological studies due to poor health and return to the United States.

Hess would then be employed in a series of professions working in the lumber, coal, brick businesses. He worked as a cashier for the Saucon Savings Bank from 1873 to 1877 and became the Superintendent of the Christ Union Sunday School in Hellertown. He would become the principal of the Hellertown Academy from 1878 to 1880.

Hess' political career began when he was elected as the Chief Burgess of Hellertown. Chief Burgess is an old English political office that acted as a municipalities executive, but largely as a ceremonial office with little political power, the office would be replaced by a mayoral government in the early 20th century. Hess would then be elected to the Helletown town council. Hess would then be elected to the 18th district of the Pennsylvania Senate as a Democrat, serving for a single term from 1883 to 1886. During his time in senate he would be a part of the Education, Insurance, Legislative Apportionment, and Library committees.

Hess would die on March 29, 1928, at the age of 84 and is buried in the Union Cemetery in Hellertown.

== Personal life ==
Hess married Tillie Née Henninger in 1875. The couple had four children, Herbert H. Hess, Clara Hess, Mary L. Hess and Samuel Hess. Jeremiah S. Hess would found the Pennsylvania German Society in 1891, and was also a Freemason for 26 years.
