= Morgan Hill (Pennsylvania) =

Mountain in Pennsylvania, United States

Highest point
- Elevation: 673 ft (205 m) NGVD 29
- Coordinates: 40°39′53″N 75°12′22″W

Geography
- Location: Northampton County, Pennsylvania, U.S.
- Parent range: Reading Prong
- Topo map: USGS Easton

Climbing
- Easiest route: Road

Morgan Hill, or Mammy Morgans Hill is a low mountain in Northampton County, Pennsylvania. The main peak rises to 673 feet (205 m), and is located in Williams Township, to the south of Easton. Morgan Hill overlooks the Delaware River, and Interstate 78. It is a part of the Reading Prong of the Appalachian Mountains.

== Toponymy ==
Morgan Hill takes its name from Elizabeth Bell Morgan (c1759 - 1839), widow of Dr. Abel Morgan. A prominent leader in the local community, Mrs. Morgan operated a tavern atop the hill that later bore her name.
