= Focht Hill =

Hill in Pennsylvania, United States

Highest point
- Elevation: 807 ft (246 m) NGVD 29
- Coordinates: 40°35′28″N 75°17′57″W

Geography
- Location: Northampton County, Pennsylvania, U.S.
- Parent range: Reading Prong
- Topo map: USGS in Hellertown, Pennsylvania

Climbing
- Easiest route: Hiking

Focht Hill is a low mountain in Northampton County, Pennsylvania. The main peak, which rises to 807 feet (246 m), is in Lower Saucon Township east of Hellertown.

The mountain is part of the Reading Prong of the Appalachian Mountains.
