= Kirchberg (Pennsylvania) =

Mountain in Pennsylvania, United States

Highest point
- Elevation: 1,004 ft (306 m) NGVD 29
- Coordinates: 40°35′22″N 75°18′56″W

Geography
- Location: Northampton County, Pennsylvania, U.S.
- Parent range: Reading Prong
- Topo map: USGS in Hellertown, Pennsylvania

Climbing
- Easiest route: Hiking

The Kirchberg is a mountain in Northampton County, Pennsylvania in the Lehigh Valley region of eastern Pennsylvania. The main peak, which rises to 1,004 feet (306 m), is in Lower Saucon Township, east of Hellertown, overlooking Saucon Gap to the west.

The mountain is part of the Reading Prong of the Appalachian Mountains.
