= Christines Hill =

Mountain in Northampton County, Pennsylvania, US

Highest point
- Elevation: 748 ft (228 m) NGVD 29
- Coordinates: 40°36′51″N 75°15′20″W

Geography
- Location: Northampton County, Pennsylvania, U.S.
- Parent range: Reading Prong
- Topo map: USGS Hellertown

Climbing
- Easiest route: Road

Christines Hill is a low mountain in Northampton County, Pennsylvania. The main peak rises to 748 feet (228 m), and is located in Williams Township, to the south of Easton and west of Hexenkopf Hill.

It is a part of the Reading Prong of the Appalachian Mountains.
