= Jacob Dachrodt =

American politician

Captain Jacob Dachrodt
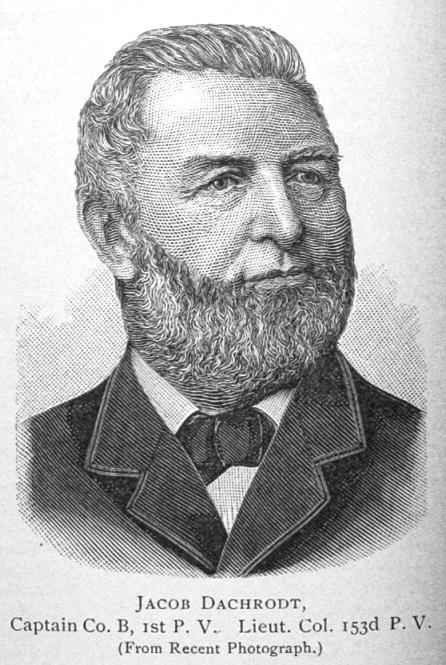

Member of the Pennsylvania Senate from the 18th district
- In office 1887–1891
- Preceded by: Jeremiah S. Hess
- Succeeded by: Edward Henry Laubach

Member of Easton City Council
- In office 1853–1856

Personal details
- Born: September 11, 1828 Easton, Pennsylvania
- Died: September 11, 1909 (aged 81)
- Party: Democratic
- Spouse: Isabelle Dachrodt
- Children: John Dachrodt
- Occupation: Butcher

Military service
- Branch/service: Union (American Civil War)
- Years of service: July 27, 1861-July 24, 1863
- Rank: Captain

Jacob Dachrodt (1828-1909) was an American Civil War hero who served as the captain of the 1st Pennsylvania Infantry Regiment's Company B. Following his reenlistment with the 153rd Pennsylvania Infantry Regiment, he was subsequently commissioned as the regiment's lieutenant colonel.

After the war, he was elected to the Pennsylvania State Senate in the 18th district as a Democrat.

== Biography ==
=== Early life ===
Jacob Dachrodt was born on September 11, 1828, in Easton, Northampton County, Pennsylvania. He was born to John and Julia Dachrodt and was privately tutored by Professor John Wandervere. His father was a butcher and an influential local businessman. He was the eldest of three daughters and six sons.

Dachrodt was elected to the Easton City Council, serving from 1853 to 1856.

=== Civil war service ===
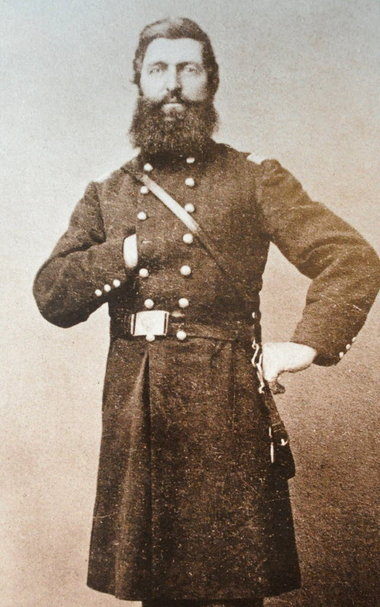
Dachrodt as a captain in the Union Army

Eight days after the Battle of Fort Sumter Dachrodt volunteered for the Union army with three of his brothers. At the age of thirty-three, using his reputation as a former borough councilor, he raised his own unit, the Easton's Citizens’ Artillery. Dachrodt was then elected by his men as their captain.

Following completion of his men's three months' service, Dachrodt and his men were honorably discharged, and mustered out of service. Dachrodt then reenlisted as a private on July 27, 1861. His Easton's Citizens’ Artillery was merged with the Easton National Guards, a unit that was led by fellow Easton borough councilor Samuel S. Yohe, with the Easton Jaegers led by Charles Glanz, and with another company to form the 153rd Pennsylvania Infantry Regiment.

By the time of the Battle of Gettysburg, Dachrodt had regained the rank of captain, and was later commissioned as a lieutenant colonel,

Dachrodt participated in the mud march, and was recognized for his valor as a captain during the Battle of Chancellorsville and the Battle of Gettysburg. During the former, he was wounded by a gunshot to the elbow and was eventually discharged on a surgeon's certificate of disability on July 24, 1863. His brother, Daniel, enlisted as the drummer boy for Company K of the 47th Pennsylvania Volunteer Infantry Regiment and was awarded the rank of principal musician on September 1, 1862.

=== Post war ===
Following his honorable discharge, Dachrodt returned home to Pennsylvania's Lehigh Valley, where he worked as a butcher from 1864 to 1899 and owned a store at 56 South 4th Street, at what is now the Parsons-Taylor House. He retired and closed his store at the age of seventy.

In 1886, he was offered the Independent nomination for state senator; even though he did not personally campaign during what turned out to be a low-key race, he was overwhelmingly elected to the Pennsylvania State Senate. Once in office, he declared himself to be a Democrat.

During his time in the Pennsylvania Senate, he was a member of the Agriculture, Insurance, Canals and Inland Navigation, Legislative Apportionment, Military Affairs, Municipal Affairs, New County and County Seats, Pension and Gratuities and Railroads committees.

He was also a member of the Grand Army of the Republic as part of the G.A.R.'s LaFayette post (number 217).

== Death and interment ==
Dachrodt died in Easton on June 4, 1909, at the age of eighty-one and was buried in the Easton Cemetery.
