= 153rd Pennsylvania Infantry Regiment =

- Also known as the 153rd Pennsylvania or the 153rd Pennsylvania Volunteers
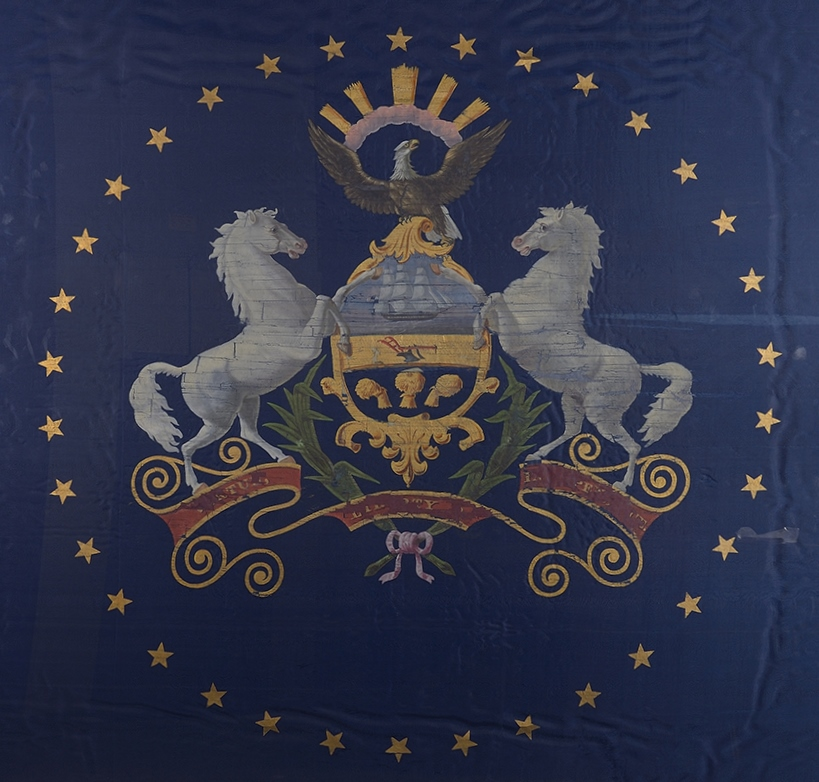
- Active: October 7 and October 11, 1862 - July 23–24, 1863
- Country: United States
- Allegiance: Union
- Branch: Union Army
- Type: Infantry
- Size: 990 (Muster-in); 700 (At Chancellorsville); 545 (At Gettysburg); 813 (Muster-out)
- Part of: XI Corps
- Muster-in Site: Camp Curtin, Harrisburg, Pennsylvania
- Armaments: Springfield Model 1855 and Lorenz Rifle Model 1854 Rifles
- Engagements: Action at Aldie, Virginia (November 9, 1862); Battle of Fredericksburg (In Reserve and wasn't engaged, December 11–15, 1862); Burnside's Mud March (January 20–22, 1863); Battle of Chancellorsville (April 30 – May 6, 1863); Battle of Gettysburg (July 1–3, 1863); Pursuit of Lee (July 5–12, 1863)

Commanders
- Notable commanders: Colonel Charles Glanuz; Lieutenant Colonel Jacob Dachrodt; Major John F. Frueauff

Insignia
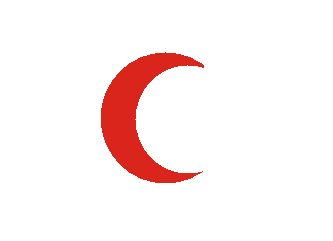
- XI Corps, 1st Division

The 153rd Pennsylvania Infantry Regiment, also known as the 153rd Pennsylvania Volunteer Infantry Regiment, was an infantry regiment that served with the Union Army during the American Civil War. Largely consisting of German-Americans from Northampton County, the regiment saw significant action at the Battles of Chancellorsville and Gettysburg.

== Organization ==
In the summer of 1862, President Abraham Lincoln issued a call of 300,000 militia for nine months' service, with the stipulation that a draft would be instituted if quotas were not met. In Northampton County, recruitment was robust, the county exceeded its quota of 300 men, raising enough volunteers of at least a regiment of 1,000 men, largely consisting of farmers, mechanics, and others, many of whom were of German-American descent. To emphasize their voluntary enlistment, a majority of the regiment's enlisted men painted the slogan "In Lieu of a Draft" on their knapsacks.

Thirteen companies were recruited in Northampton County, but were consolidated into ten companies. The regiment was organized in Easton, Pennsylvania in September 1862 and moved to Camp Curtin, Harrisburg, on October 6. During their time at Camp Curtin, the men experienced minor administrative delays, including a hold-up in bounty payments that was resolved through the intervention of Colonel Charles Glanz. The regiment was mustered into service between October 7 and October 11, 1862.

The mobilization of the resources need was often inefficient, due to the reluctance of the Army Ordnance Department to adopt breech-loading rifles, the 153rd was issued low-quality Austrian and Belgian rifles, that were widely despised by the soldiers, leading them to mockingly refer them as "Pumpkin Slingers"

== Service ==
=== Early service ===
On October 12, the 153rd left the state and moved to Washington, D.C., to conduct duty in the defense of the city and were subsequently attached to the 1st Brigade (Commanded by Von Gilsa), 1st Division (Commanded by Stahel), XI Corps (Commanded by Sigel) of the Army of the Potomac.

On November 9, the brigade was ordered to Aldie, Virginia, briefly confronting Confederate forces before withdrawing to the vicinity of Chantilly on November 18. On December 9, the regiment marched towards Fredericksburg, arriving at Stafford Court House on December 16, following the Battle of Fredericksburg. The regiment went into camp, south of Accakeek Creek, and would conduct picket and guard duties.

On January 20, 1863, the regiment would participate in Burnside's Mud March, alongside the 8th New York and a section of Dickman's Battery. The regiment moved to Brooks' Station to conduct picket duty. Following the Mud March, the regiment moved to Aquia Creek, constructing temporary quarters. Three days later, the regiment moved to Potomac Creek Bridge, where it remained there for 134 days, performing camp and fatigue duties. The harsh winter on the ecampment took a toll on the unit; widespread sickness resulted in the deaths or permanent disability of several men.

=== Battle of Chancellorsville ===
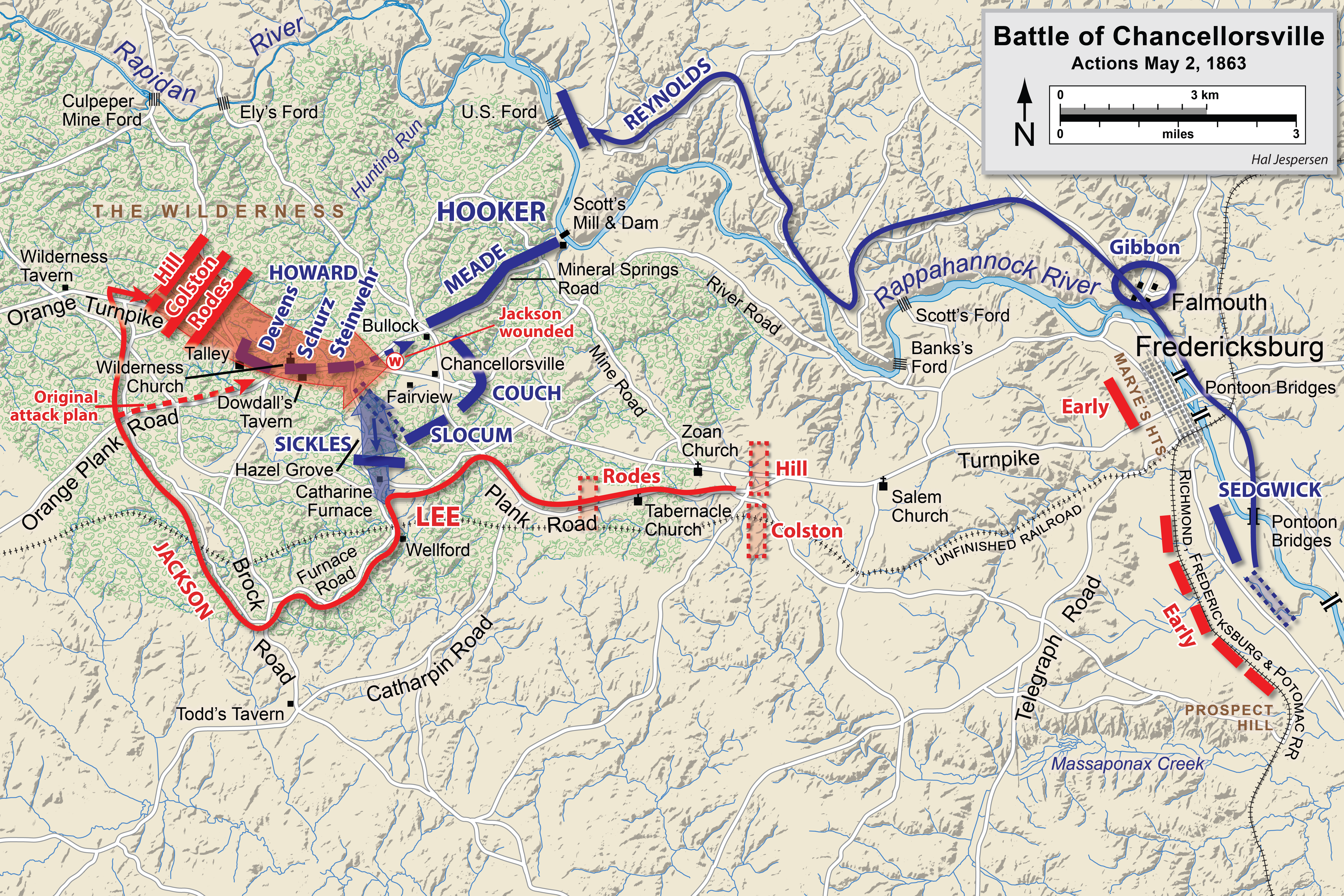
Battle of Chancellorsville, May 2

On April 27, 1863, the regiment broke their winter quarters and marched with the Army of the Potomac for the Chancellorsville Campaign, the 153rd marched in the Wilderness, crossing the Rappahannock River at Kelly's Ford and the Rapidan River at Germania Mills, arriving at the battlefield at 4:00 PM on April 30. The 153rd was assigned to a highly exposed and unique tactical position on the extreme flank of the Union army. They were deployed in a semi-circle formation in the dense, tangled woods, basically rendering them defenseless against a flanking maneuver.

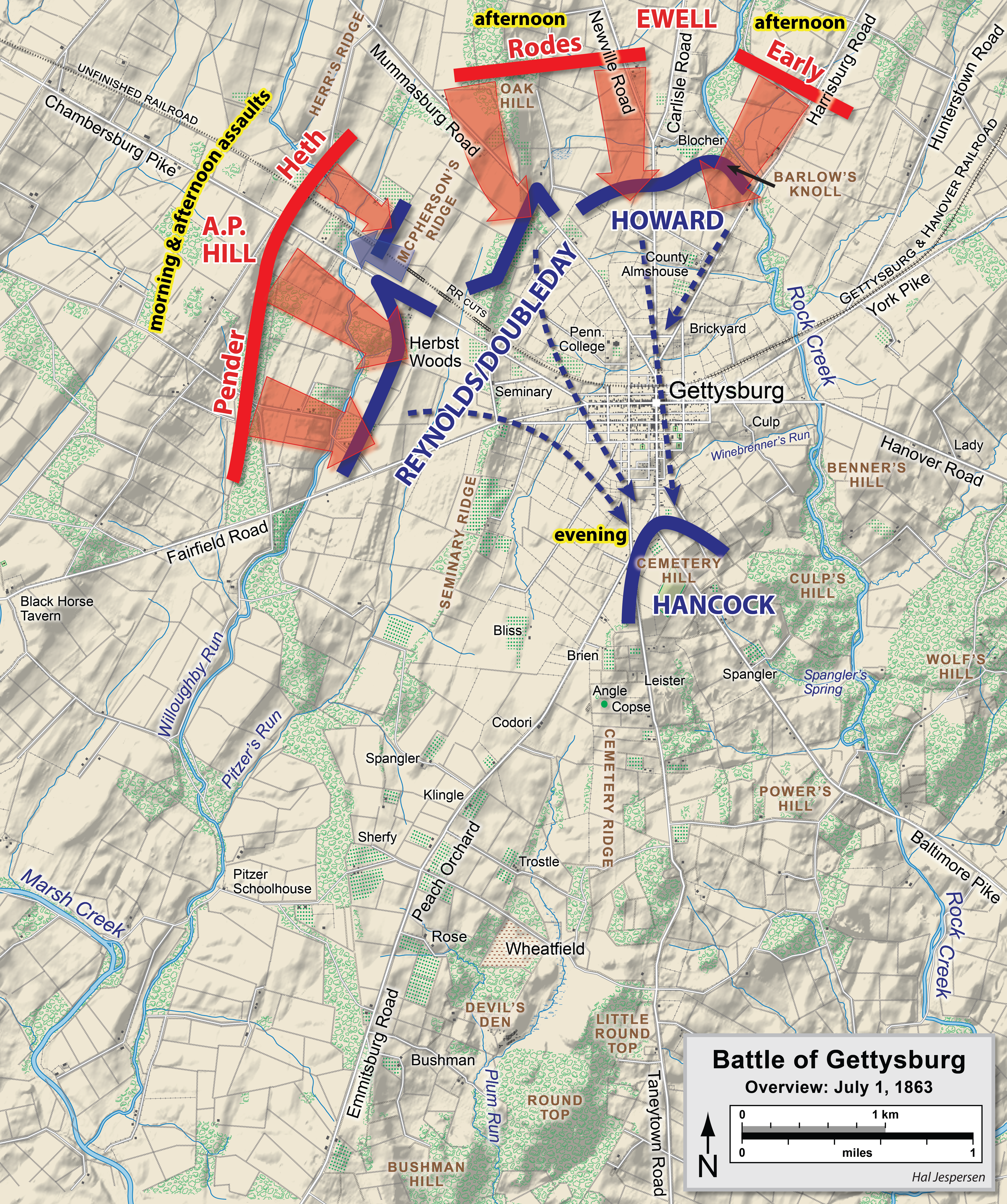
Map of the Battle of Gettysburg, July 1

Following a skirmish on May 1, the regiment spent the morning resting their arms and clearing timber for slight barricades. on May 2, a misstep took place when Union forces opened fired at Confederate scouts, revealing their exact position and strength of the XI's Corps' right flank. Skirmishers under Major Owen Rice were sent forward and would report of a massive Confederate build up, but were dismissed by high command.

Late that afternoon, at approximately 5:00 PM, they bore the brunt of Stonewall Jackson's flank attack, outnumbered and enveloped on three sides, the 153rd fired a single volley before they were forced to retreat through dense thickets, with the regiment being scattered in the darkness. Amidst the chaos, at least 300 out of the 700 men of the regiment managed to rally near the Chancellorsville before midnight, while the rest were scattered in the dense forest, Once rallied, a 50-man fatigue detail was formed and worked on burying the dead, removing the wounded and constructing new breastworks until 2:00 AM. The regiment suffered 19 enlisted men killed, 3 officers, 53 enlisted men wounded, including Colonel Glanz, and 33 men captured.

=== Battle of Gettysburg ===
Map of East Cemetery Hill, on July 2 Union Confederate

Colonel Glanz returned from Confederate prison on June 16, 1863, but due to his health being too impaired to resume command of the regiment, Major Frueauff took command, as the Army of the Potomac marched north to take part in the Gettysburg Campaign.

==== July 1: Barlow's Knoll ====
On October 12, 153rd endured a forced march, covering at least 11 miles from Emmitsburg, Maryland to Gettysburg. Arriving at 12:30, the XI Corps was rushed through the town to support the Union right flank against the Advancing Confederates of General Richard Ewell.

The 153rd was posted on the extreme right of the Union line near Rock Creek, at the base of Barlow's Knoll, and then they were deployed alongside the 54th and 68th New York regiments. Outflanked by the overwhelming numbers of Confederate brigades of Harry T. Hays and Robert Hoke. and being subjected to heavy artillery fire, the division's position became untenable, and the regiment was forced to retreat, contesting the ground as they fell back through the streets of Gettysburg, leading to more casualties until they rallied on Cemetery Hill.

==== July 2: Cemetery Hill ====
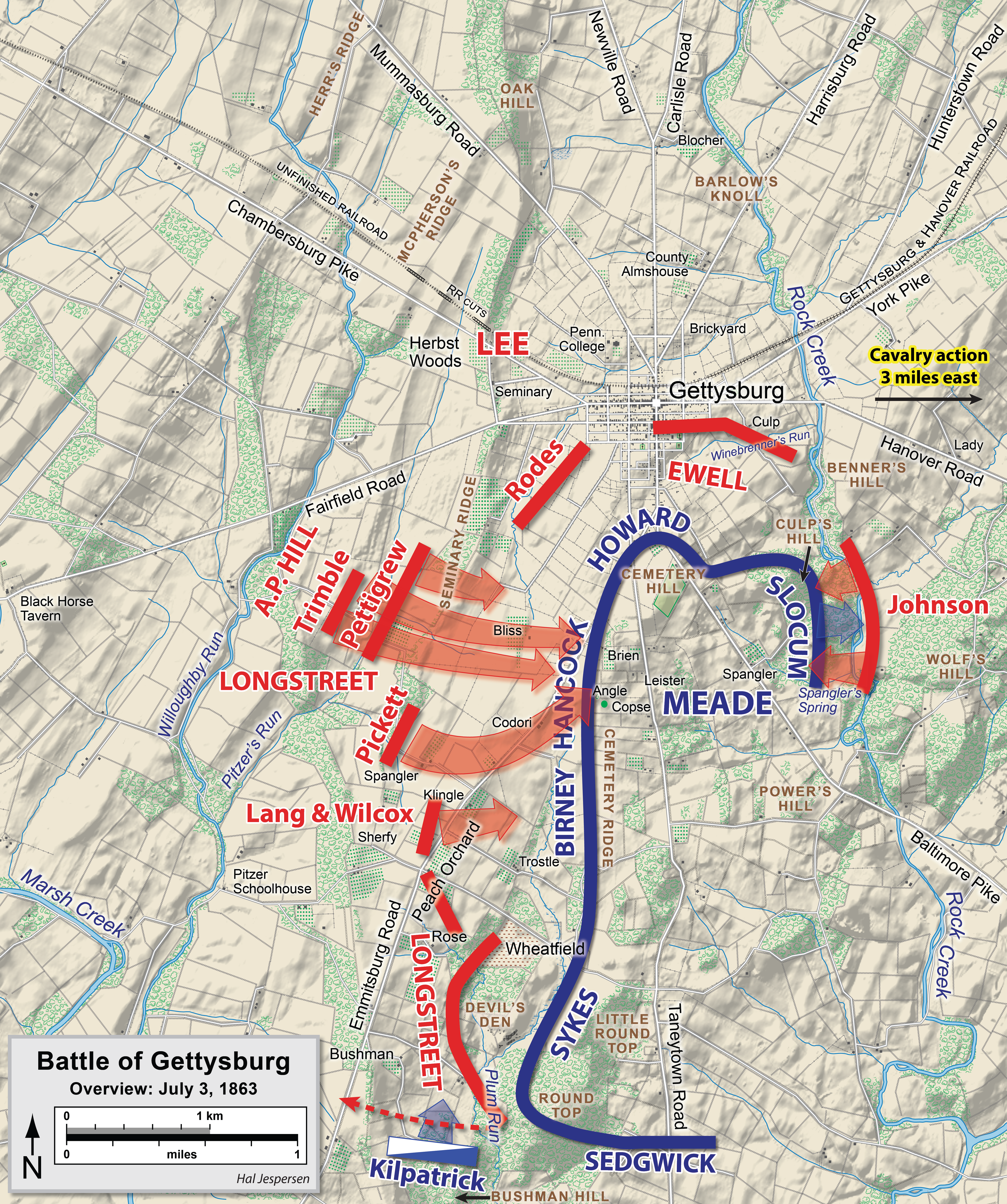
Overview map of Pickett's Charge, July 3

On Cemetery Hill, the XI Corps was tasked with protecting the massed Union artillery, with the 153rd Pennsylvania being positioned behind a stone wall at the foot of East Cemetery Hill, acting as support for the batteries.

On the evening of July 2, Confederate columns launched a desperate infantry assault on the hill. The Confederate attack temporarily breached the Union skirmish lines and reached the artillery pieces. The fighting degenerated into brutal hand-to-hand combat, where soldiers used clubs, stones, and bayonets. During the melee, a Confederate soldier threw himself over a cannon, demanding its surrender, only to be instantly killed by a German-speaking gunner who fired the cannon, with the assistance of the II Corps, the 153rd repulsed the attack and saved the batteries.

==== July 3–4: Pickett's Charge and Reconnaissance ====
Throughout July 3, the regiment held its position on the skirmish line, enduring the massive Confederate artillery barrage that preceded Pickett's Charge, as well as constant harassing fire from Confederate sharpshooters, but saw no further direct infantry assaults. During this, the brick archway and the lodge of the Evergreen Cemetery gates were used as a makeshift hospital where wounded men of the regiment were treated. On the morning of July 4, a detachment of 75 men (46 from the 153rd) under the command of Lieutenant Bachschmid conducted a reconnaissance mission into Gettysburg, which resulted in the capture of 290 Confederate prisoners and 250 stands of arms, confirming Lee's retreat.

In total, the regiment lost 211 out of their 545 engaged. (50 officers and enlisted killed, 124 officers and enlisted wounded, and 46 captured)

==== Pursuit of Lee ====
Following the battle, the 153rd joined the pursuit of Robert E Lee's Army of Northern Virginia from July 5 to July 12. By the time they reached Emmitsburg, their nine-month enlistment periods for several companies had expired. Despite this, the regiment continued the pursuit, reaching as far as Funkstown, where skirmishing had been taking place, and Hagerstown, Maryland.

== Disbandment ==
On July 14, the regiment received orders to be mustered out. During the departure, Von Gilsa delivered a farewell message to the regiment:

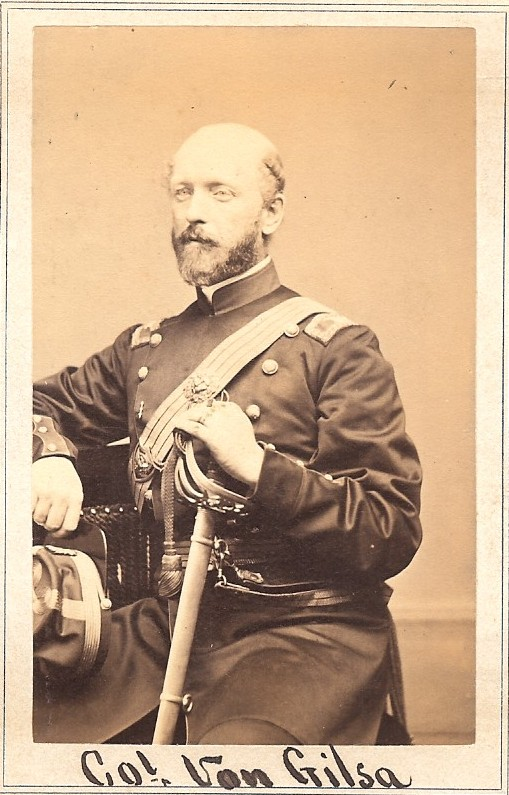
A picture of Leopold von Gilsa.

" I am an old soldier, but never did I know soldiers, who, with greater alacrity and more good will, endeavored to fulfill their duties. In the battle of Chancellorsville you, like veterans, stood your ground against fearful odds, and, although surrounded on three sides, you did not retreat until by me commanded to do so. In the three days' battle at Gettysburg, your behavior put many an old soldier to the blush, and you are justly entitled to a great share of the glory which my brigade has won for itself, by repulsing the two dreaded Tiger Brigades of Jackson. In the name of your comrades of the First Brigade, and myself, I now bid you farewell,"

The regiment traveled to Harrisburg via Frederick City and Baltimore, where they were officially mustered out of service on July 24, 1863, with 813 men, The soldiers of the regiment returned to Easton on July 25, where they were welcomed by thousands of citizens, a banquet on the local Fair Grounds, and a presentation of a ceremonial sword to Colonel Glanz.

== Casualties ==
- Killed and mortally wounded: 0 officers, 63 enlisted men
- Wounded: 2 officers, 184 enlisted men
- Died of disease: 12 officers, 495 enlisted men
- Captured or missing: 3 officers, 94 men
- Total Casualties: 17 officers, 836 enlisted men

== Armaments, organizational affiliations, and detailed service ==
The 153rd Pennsylvania were primarily equipped with Model 1855 Springfield Muskets and Model 1854 Lorenz Rifles during their service, and would report their following surveys:

=== Chancellorsville ===
- A -- 78 Austrian Rifled Muskets, leaf and block sight, Q. bayonet. Calibre .58
- B -- 61 Austrian Rifled Muskets, leaf and block sight, Q. bayonet. Calibre .58
- C -- 81 Springfield Rifled Muskets, model 1855, 1861, N.A. and contract. Calibre .58
- D -- 78 Springfield Rifled Muskets, model 1855, 1861, N.A. and contract. Calibre .58
- E -- 76 Springfield Rifled Muskets, model 1855, 1861, N.A. and contract. Calibre .58
- F -- 70 Springfield Rifled Muskets, model 1855, 1861, N.A. and contract. Calibre .58
- G -- N/A N/A
- H -- N/A N/A
- I -- 74 Springfield Rifled Muskets, model 1855, 1861, N.A. and contract. Calibre .58
- K -- 59 Austrian Rifled Muskets, leaf and block sight, Q. bayonet. Calibre .58
  Issued weapons
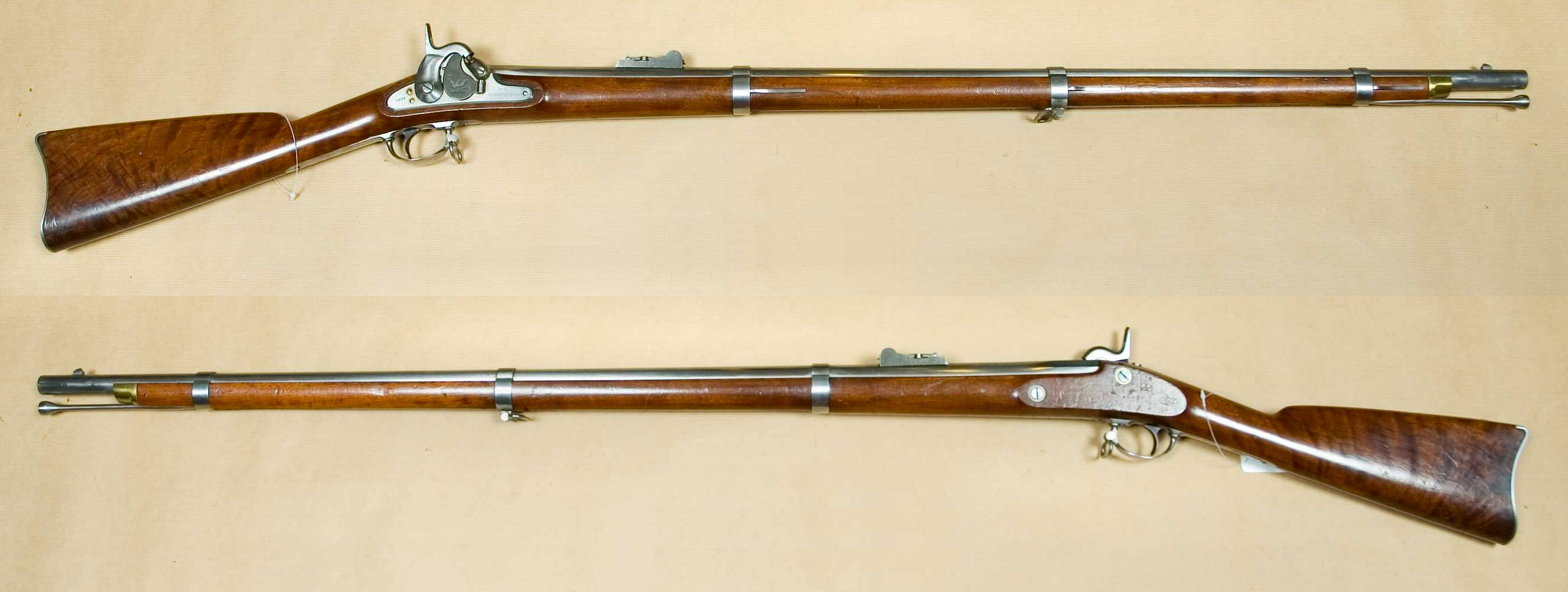
  Springfield Model 1855
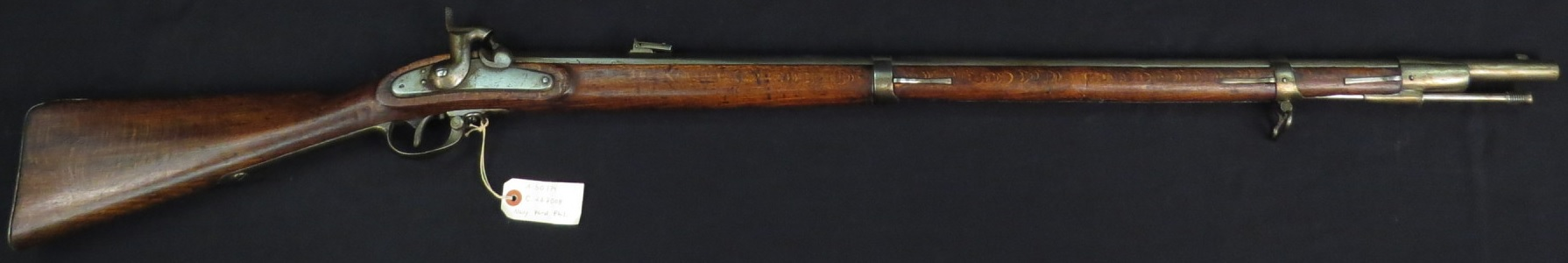
  Model 1854 Lorenz Rifles

=== Organizational Affiliations ===
the regiment was attached to various larger formations during their service, such as:

- Attached to 1st Brigade, 1st Division, 11th Army Corps, Army of the Potomac, to July, 1863.

=== Detailed service ===
==== 1862 ====
- Organized at Easton September, 1862.
- Moved to Camp Curtin, Harrisburg, October 6; thence to Washington, D.C., October 12, 1862.
- Duty in the Defences of Washington, D. C, till December, 1862.
- Reconnoissance from Chantilly to Snicker's Ferry and Berryville, Va., November 28–30.
- March to Fredericksburg, Va., December 9–18

==== 1863 ====
- Duty at Stafford Court House till January 19, 1863.
- Burnside's 2nd Campaign, "Mud March," January 20–24, 1863.
- At Stafford Court House till April 27.
- Chancellorsville Campaign April 27-May 6.
- Battle of Chancellorsville May 1–5.
- Gettysburg (Pa.) Campaign June 11-July 24.
- Battle of Gettysburg July 1–3.
- Pursuit of Lee July 5–12.
- Mustered out July 24, 1863.

== Legacy ==
In 1889, a monument of the 153rd at Pennsylvania was dedicated by Pennsylvania, the monument stands about 15'6 high, and is topped with the statue of a regimental bugler, with the crescent moon of the XI corps on its front above a bronze tablet, that includes a seal of the State of Pennsylvania.

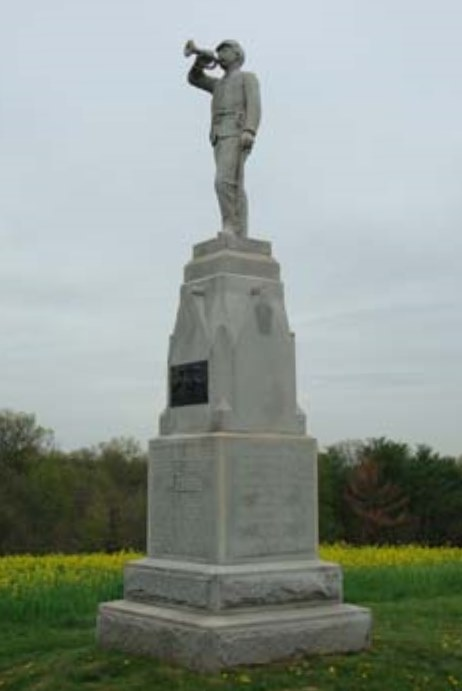
Monument of the 153rd Pennsylvania in Gettysburg.

A secondary monument, just south of Gettysburg on Wainwright Avenue, was dedicated in 1884 by survivors of the regiment, it stands almost 6 feet tall, with it being made out of polished granite, and includes the keystone symbol of Pennsylvania and the Crescent moon of the XI Corps.

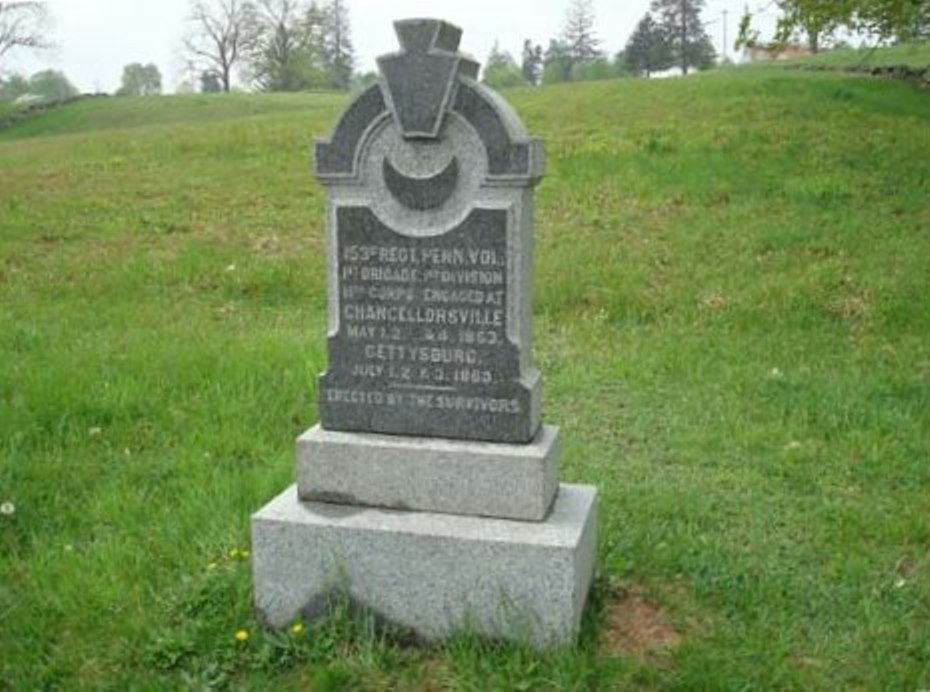
The secondary monument of the regiment at Wainwright Avenue, Gettysburg.

== Commanders ==
- Colonel Charles Glanz
- Lieutenant Colonel Jacob Dachrodt
- Major John F. Frueauff

== See also ==
- List of Pennsylvania Civil War regiments
- Pennsylvania in the Civil War
