= Applebutter Hill =

Hill in Pennsylvania, United States

Highest point
- Elevation: 850 ft (260 m) NGVD 29
- Coordinates: 40°31′03″N 75°25′50″W

Geography
- Location: Lehigh County, Pennsylvania, U.S.
- Parent range: Reading Prong
- Topo map: USGS Allentown East

Climbing
- Easiest route: Road

Applebutter Hill is a low mountain in Lehigh County, Pennsylvania. The main peak rises to 850 feet (259 m), and is located in Upper Saucon Township. Applebutter Hill is located to the west of Center Valley, and is north of Coopersburg.

It is part of the Reading Prong of the Appalachian Mountains.
