= Watnong Mountain =

Mountain in New Jersey, United States

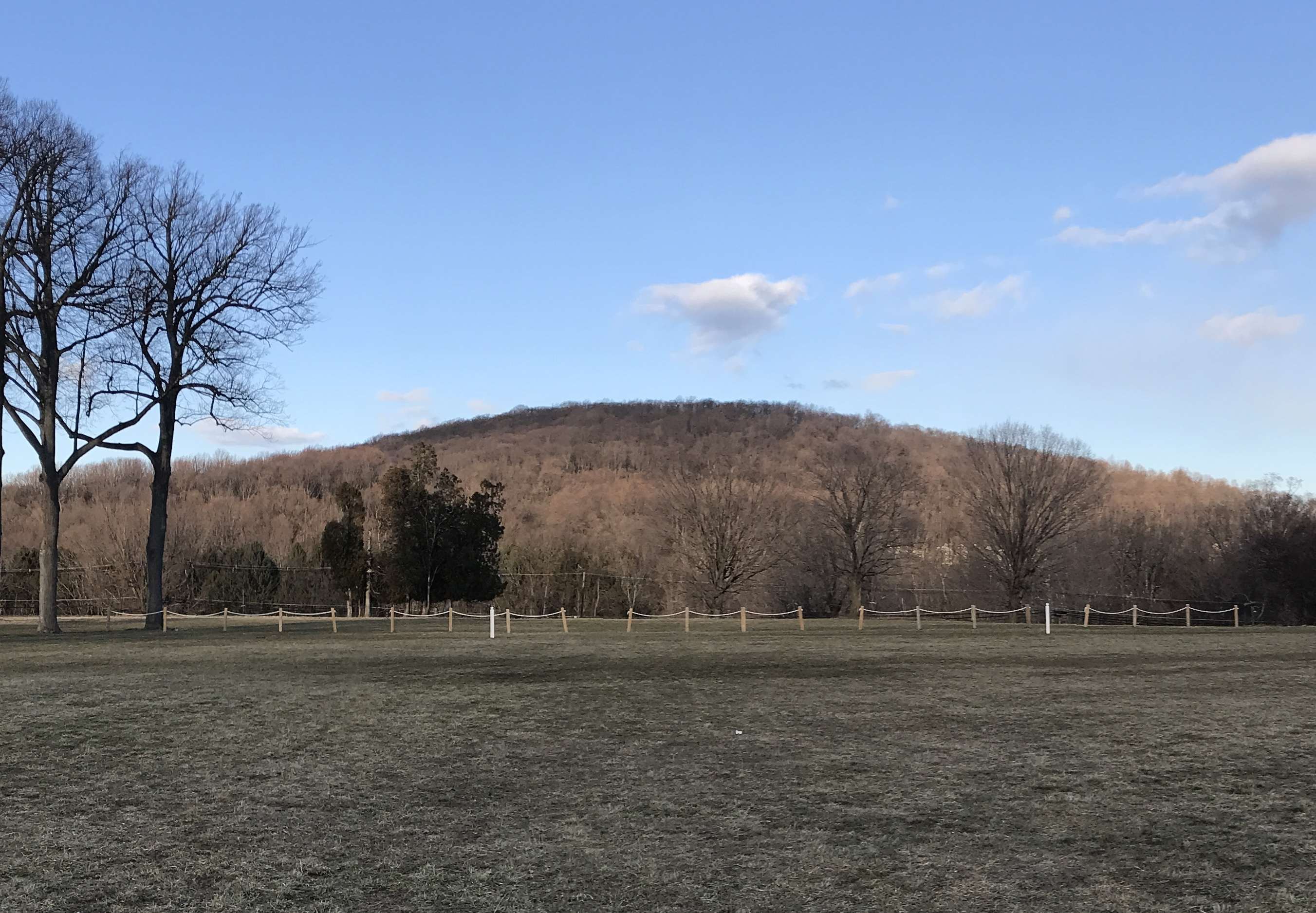
- Watnong Mountain from near the Greystone Park Psychiatric Hospital

Highest point
- Elevation: 965 ft (294 m) NGVD 29
- Coordinates: 40°50′56″N 74°29′35″W

Geography
- Location: Morris County, New Jersey, U.S.
- Topo map: USGS Morristown

Climbing
- Easiest route: Road

Watnong Mountain is a mountain in Morris County, New Jersey. The major peak rises to 965 feet (294 m). It is located in Parsippany-Troy Hills Township and overlooks Morris Plains to the east. It is part of the New York–New Jersey Highlands of the Reading Prong. It was used for signaling and as a lookout by troops of the Continental Army, who left a large stone staircase up the mountainside.
