= Oxford Mountain =

Mountain in New Jersey, United States

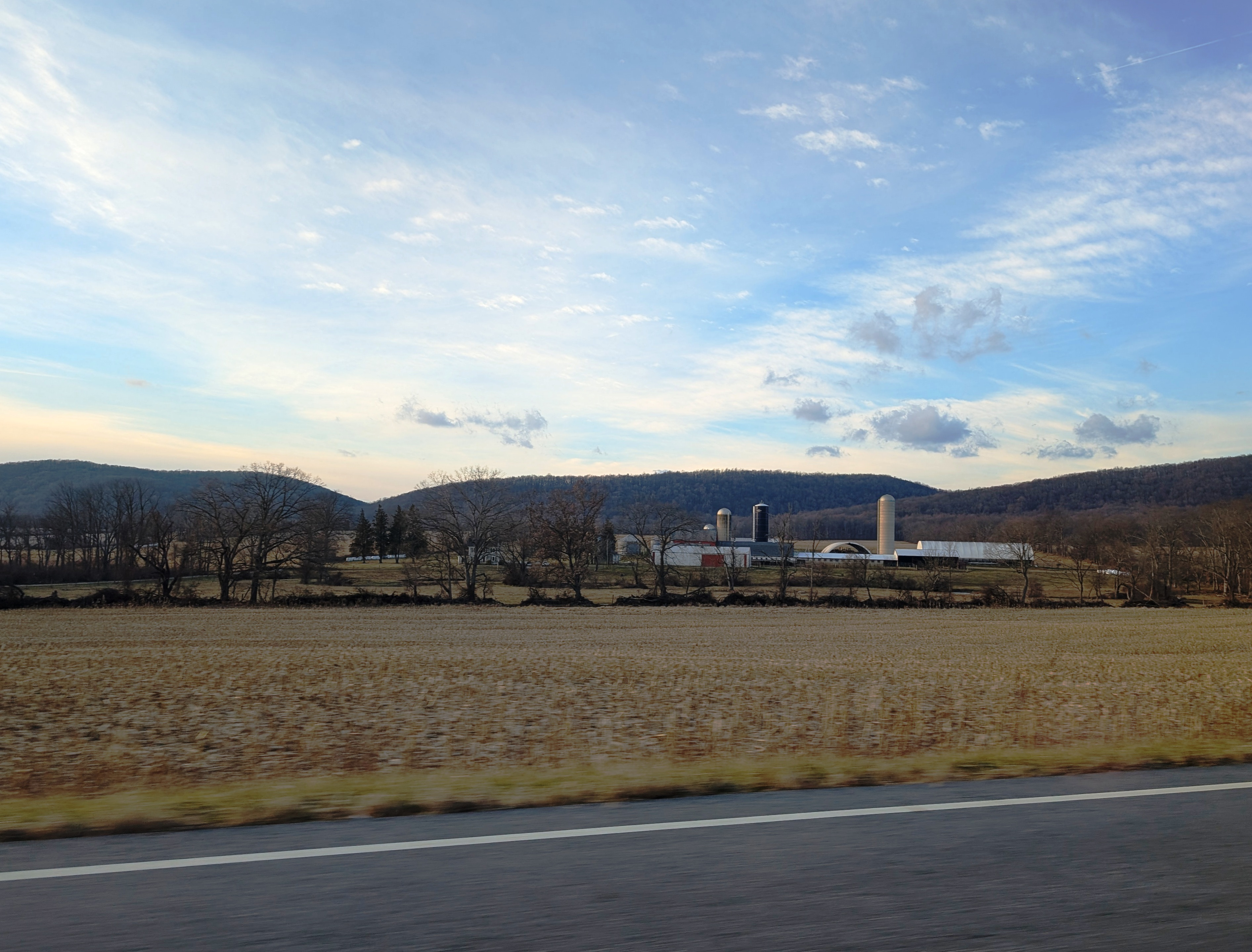
- Oxford Mountain in the background as seen from Mansfield Township

Highest point
- Elevation: 955 ft (291 m) NGVD 29
- Coordinates: 40°47′50″N 74°59′08″W

Geography
- Location: Warren County, New Jersey, U.S.
- Topo map: USGS Washington

Climbing
- Easiest route: Hiking

Oxford Mountain is a mountain in the New York–New Jersey Highlands of the Appalachian Mountains in Warren County, New Jersey. The main peak rises to 955 feet (291 m), and is located in Oxford, Washington and Mansfield Townships. Oxford Mountain is separated from County House Mountain to the northeast at Sykes Gap, and forms a part of the divide between Pohatcong Creek and the Pequest River.
