= Marble Mountain (New Jersey) =

Mountain in New Jersey, United States

Highest point
- Elevation: 771 ft (235 m) NGVD 29
- Coordinates: 40°43′51″N 75°09′40″W

Geography
- Location: Warren County, New Jersey, U.S.
- Topo map: USGS Easton

Climbing
- Easiest route: Hiking

Marble Mountain is a mountain in Warren County, New Jersey. The summit rises to 771 feet (235 m), and is located in Harmony and Lopatcong Townships, overlooking the Delaware River; along with Chestnut Hill on the Pennsylvania side, Marble Mountain forms Weygadt Gap or the Little Water Gap.

It is part of the New York–New Jersey Highlands of the Appalachian Mountains, although somewhat isolated to the west of the main body of the Highlands.
