= Lehigh Mountain =

Mountain in Pennsylvania, United States

Highest point
- Elevation: 843 ft (257 m) NGVD 29
- Coordinates: 40°35′54″N 75°25′10″W

Geography
- Location: Lehigh County, Pennsylvania, U.S.
- Parent range: Reading Prong
- Topo map: USGS Allentown East

Climbing
- Easiest route: Hiking

Lehigh Mountain is a mountain in Lehigh County, Pennsylvania. The main peak rises to 843 feet (257 m) and is located in Salisbury Township. Lehigh Mountain is located on the right bank of the Lehigh River, and is separated from South Mountain by the headwaters of Trout Creek. It is part of the Reading Prong of the Appalachian Mountains.
