= Baldpate Mountain (Warren County, New Jersey) =

Mountain in Warren County, New Jersey, United States

- Location within Warren County, New Jersey

Highest point
- Elevation: 1,165 ft (355 m) NGVD 29
- Coordinates: 40°49′00″N 74°54′07″W

Geography
- Location: Warren County, New Jersey, U.S.
- Topo map: USGS Washington

Climbing
- Easiest route: Hiking

Baldpate Mountain is a peak in the New York–New Jersey Highlands of the Reading Prong of Upper Pohatcong Mountain in Warren County, New Jersey, United States. This peak rises to 1,165 feet (355 m), and is located in Mansfield Township.
