= Forks Township, Northampton County, Pennsylvania =

Township in Pennsylvania, US

Forks Township
- Township
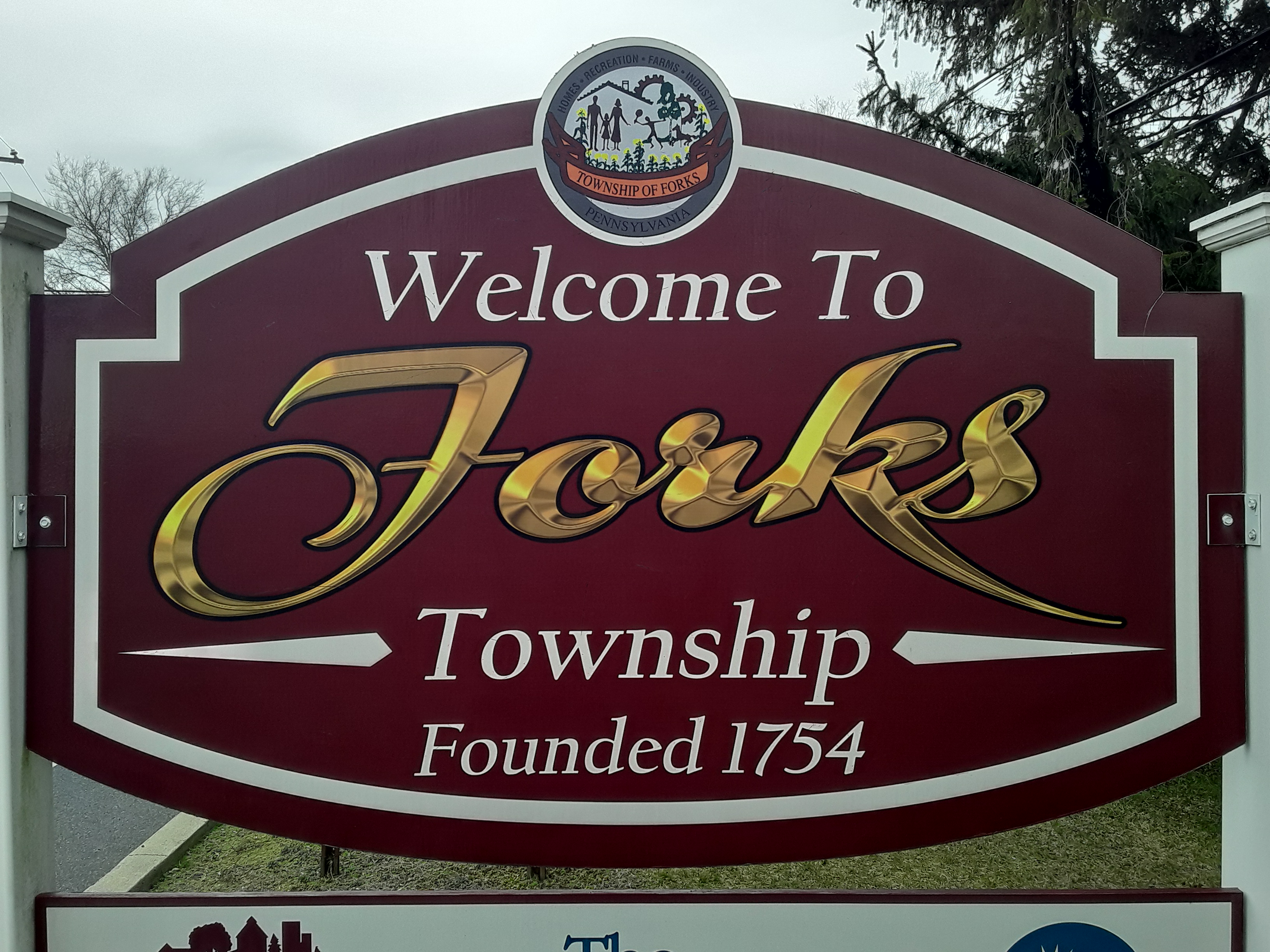
- Forks Township's welcome sign in November 2020

- Seal

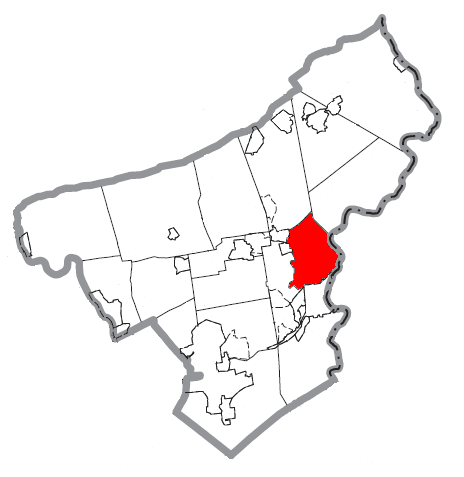
- Location of Forks Township in Northampton County, Pennsylvania

- Location of Forks Township in Pennsylvania in the United States
- Coordinates: 40°45′06″N 75°13′59″W
- Country: United States
- State: Pennsylvania
- County: Northampton
- Founded: 1754

Area
  - Township: 12.27 sq mi (31.79 km^{2})
  - Land: 12.10 sq mi (31.35 km^{2})
  - Water: 0.17 sq mi (0.43 km^{2})
- Elevation: 377 ft (115 m)

Population (2020)
  - Township: 16,077
  - Estimate (2023): 16,456
  - Density: 1,273.6/sq mi (491.75/km^{2})
  - Metro: 865,310 (US: 68th)
- Time zone: UTC-5 (EST)
  - Summer (DST): UTC-4 (EDT)
- Area code: 610
- FIPS code: 42-095-26728
- Primary airport: Lehigh Valley International Airport
- Major hospital: St. Luke’s Anderson Campus
- School district: Easton Area
- Website: www.forkstownship.org

Forks Township is a township in Northampton County, Pennsylvania, United States. The population of Forks Township was 16,077 as of the 2020 census. It is part of the Lehigh Valley metropolitan area, which had a population of 861,899 and was the 68th-most populous metropolitan area in the U.S. as of the 2020 census. The township is home to the global headquarters of Crayola, founded in 1885, a global arts supply company and the world's leading manufacturer of crayons.

Forks Township is located 20.8 miles (33.5 km) northeast of Allentown, 80.5 miles (129.6 km) north of Philadelphia, and 74.6 miles (120.1 km) west of New York City.

== History ==
Prior to the Walking Purchase in 1737, the Lenape, a Native American tribe, inhabited the area and many Lenape artifacts were found in the area. Forks Township was founded in 1754 north of Easton, Pennsylvania. It was founded as a farming based community in-between the Bushkill Creek and Delaware River.

Permanent settlement by the colonists happened in the early 18th century due to its proximity to an Irish-Scottish settlement named "Hunter's Settlement" in Lower Mount Bethel Township. After decades of new settlers settling in the Lehigh Valley, Northampton County was formed from Bucks County, Pennsylvania to its south. Many taverns and inns were developed to meet the demand of passengers through the area, such as Pennsylvania Route 611 in the 19th century.

During the Industrial Revolution, many dairy industries and blacksmiths emerged in the region. Crayola was founded in 1903 as a small crayon industry in Easton, and moved its headquarters to Forks Township.

In the mid-20th century, the decrease of agriculture led to major suburban development in the area. Since the 1990s, the area has converted to mostly a residential suburb of Easton.

== Geography ==
According to the U.S. Census Bureau, the township has a total area of 12.2 square miles (32 km^{2}), of which 12.1 square miles (31 km^{2}) is land and 0.2 square miles (0.52 km^{2}) (1.39%) is water. It is drained by the Delaware River, which separates it from New Jersey. Its six villages are Chestnut Hill, Churchville, Keplers Mill, Sandts Eddy, Uhlers Station, and Zucksville. The township was named Forks since it lies at the "fork" of two rivers in the region, the Delaware and Lehigh.

=== Neighboring municipalities ===
- Easton (south)
- Wilson (tangent to the south)
- Palmer Township (west)
- Tatamy (north northwest )
- Stockertown (northwest)
- Plainfield Township (north)
- Lower Mount Bethel Township (northeast)
- Harmony Township, New Jersey (east)
- Lopatcong Township, New Jersey (east)

== Transportation ==
As of 2015, there were 88.35 miles (142.19 km) of public roads in Forks Township, of which 23.78 miles (38.27 km) were maintained by the Pennsylvania Department of Transportation (PennDOT) and 64.57 miles (103.92 km) were maintained by the township.

Pennsylvania Route 611 transverses Forks Township, running north-to-south through the township along the Delaware River. Other local roads of note include Bushkill Drive, Frost Hollow Road, Kesslersville Road, Knox Avenue/Sullivan Trail, Newlins Road, Richmond Road, Uhler Road, and Zucksville Road.

== Demographics ==
Historical population
| Census | Pop. | Note | %± |
|---|---|---|---|
| 1850 | 2,321 | | — |
| 1860 | 1,140 | | −50.9% |
| 1870 | 1,450 | | 27.2% |
| 1880 | 1,382 | | −4.7% |
| 1890 | 1,189 | | −14.0% |
| 1900 | 1,147 | | −3.5% |
| 1910 | 1,132 | | −1.3% |
| 1920 | 1,100 | | −2.8% |
| 1930 | 1,413 | | 28.5% |
| 1940 | 1,531 | | 8.4% |
| 1950 | 1,948 | | 27.2% |
| 1960 | 3,249 | | 66.8% |
| 1970 | 3,930 | | 21.0% |
| 1980 | 4,612 | | 17.4% |
| 1990 | 5,969 | | 29.4% |
| 2000 | 8,419 | | 41.0% |
| 2010 | 14,721 | | 74.9% |
| 2020 | 16,077 | | 9.2% |
| 2023 (est.) | 16,456 | | 2.4% |
U.S. Decennial Census

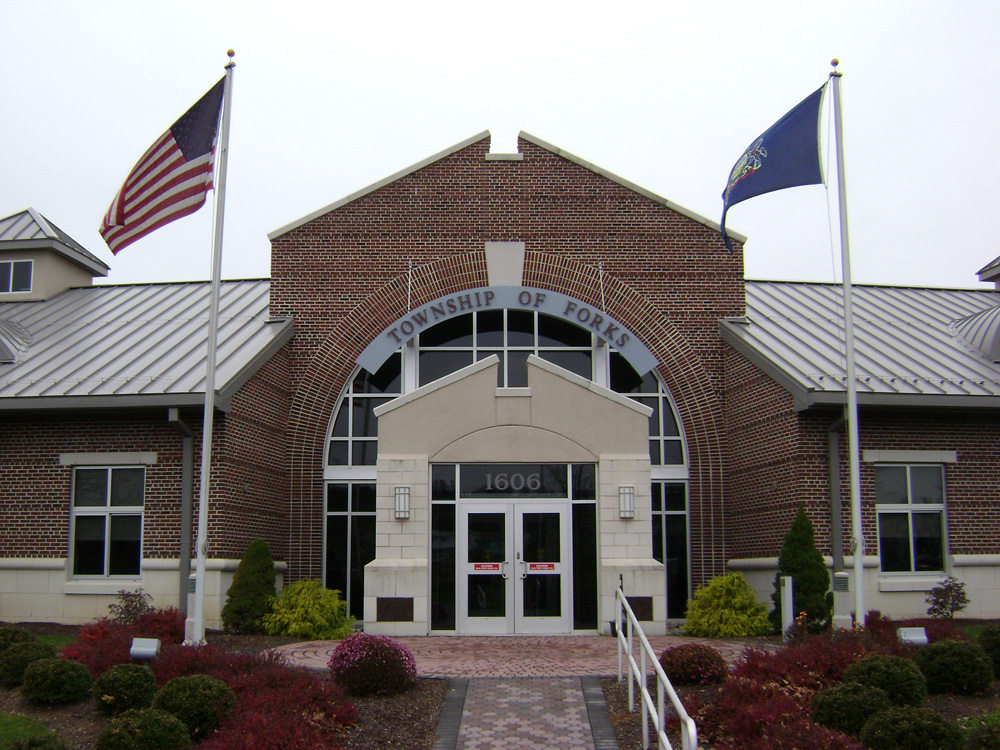
Forks Municipal Building in November 2009

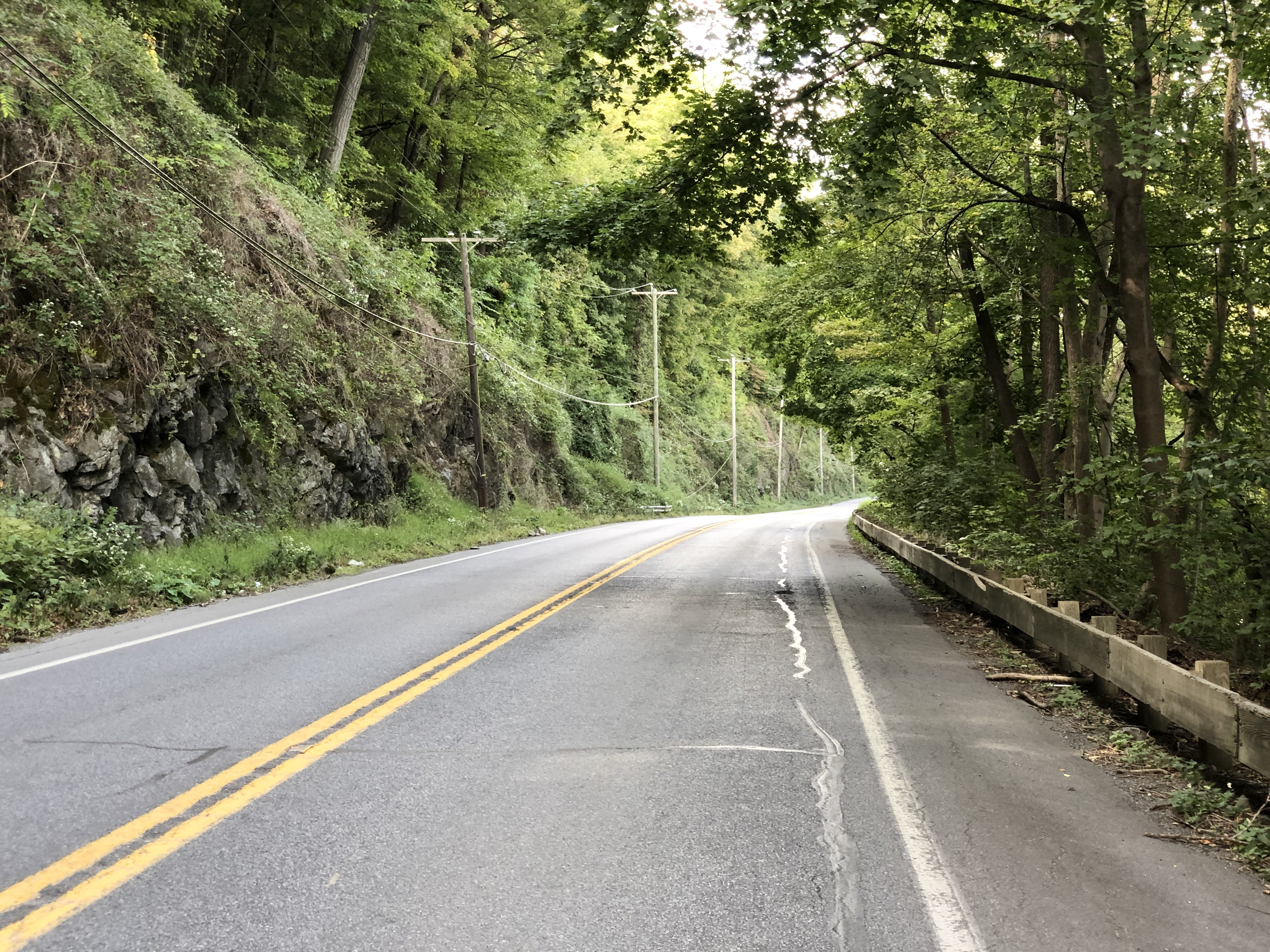
PA Route 611 North in Forks Township in September 2022

At the 2000 census there were 8,419 people, 3,035 households, and 2,415 families living in the township. The population density was 698.2 inhabitants per square mile (269.6/km^{2}). There were 3,159 housing units at an average density of 262.0 per square mile (101.2/km^{2}). The racial makeup of the township was 94.92% White, 2.24% African American, 0.05% Native American, 1.39% Asian, 0.01% Pacific Islander, 0.62% from other races, and 0.77% from two or more races. Hispanic or Latino of any race were 2.05%.

There were 3,035 households, 39.8% had children under the age of 18 living with them, 70.7% were married couples living together, 6.3% had a female householder with no husband present, and 20.4% were non-families. 17.0% of households were made up of individuals, and 6.8% were one person aged 65 or older. The average household size was 2.76 and the average family size was 3.13. The age distribution was 27.6% under the age of 18, 4.3% from 18 to 24, 31.3% from 25 to 44, 24.1% from 45 to 64, and 12.7% 65 or older. The median age was 39 years. For every 100 females, there were 95.7 males. For every 100 females age 18 and over, there were 94.1 males. The median household income was $66,055 and the median family income was $70,587. Males had a median income of $51,965 versus $30,661 for females. The per capita income for the township was $26,180. About 2.7% of families and 3.0% of the population were below the poverty line, including 2.7% of those under age 18 and 6.0% of those age 65 or over.

== Education ==
The township is served by the Easton Area School District, and is home to three of the school district's schools: Shawnee Elementary, Forks Elementary, and Easton Area Middle School for grades five through eight. Students in grades nine through 12 attend Easton Area High School in Easton.
