= County House Mountain =

Mountain in New Jersey, United States

Highest point
- Elevation: 1,142 ft (348 m) NGVD 29
- Coordinates: 40°48′27″N 74°57′31″W

Geography
- Location: Warren County, New Jersey, U.S.
- Topo map: USGS Washington

Climbing
- Easiest route: Hiking

County House Mountain is a mountain in Warren County, New Jersey. The main peak rises to 1,142 feet (348 m), and is located in Mansfield Township. County House Mountain is separated from Oxford Mountain to the southwest at Sykes Gap, and is itself bifurcated at Stewart Gap; it forms a part of the divide between Pohatcong Creek and the Pequest River. It is part of the New York–New Jersey Highlands of the Appalachian Mountains.
