= Hexenkopf Hill =

Hill in Pennsylvania, United States

Highest point
- Elevation: 646 ft (197 m) NGVD 29
- Coordinates: 40°37′16″N 75°14′35″W

Geography
- Location: Northampton County, Pennsylvania, U.S.
- Parent range: Reading Prong
- Topo map(s): USGS Riegelsville, Easton

Climbing
- Easiest route: Road

Hexenkopf Hill (German: Hexenkopf, "Witches Head") is a low mountain in Northampton County, Pennsylvania. The main peak rises to 646 feet (197 m), and is located in Williams Township, to the south of Easton.

It is a part of the Reading Prong of the Appalachian Mountains.

== Toponymy ==
Hexenkopf Hill is said to have been a shrine for local Native Americans. Early white settlers believed it to be inhabited by witches.
