= Hellertown, Pennsylvania =

Borough in Pennsylvania, US

- Borough
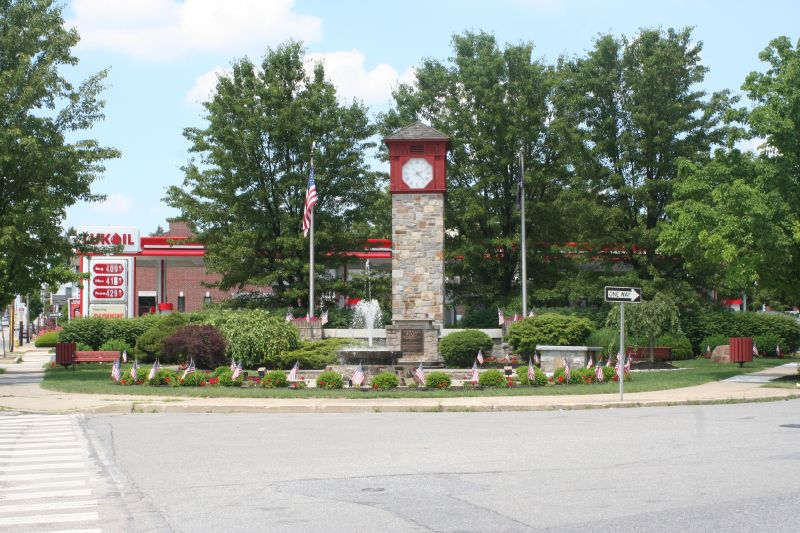
- Detwiller Plaza in Hellertown in June 2008

- Seal

- Location of Hellertown in Northampton County, Pennsylvania (left) and of Northampton County in Pennsylvania (right)

- Location of Hellertown in Pennsylvania Hellertown (the United States)
- Coordinates: 40°35′03″N 75°20′17″W
- Country: United States
- State: Pennsylvania
- County: Northampton
- Established: 1742
- Named for: Johann Christoph(er) Heller and Johann Simon Heller

Government
  - Mayor: David J. Heintzelman (D)

Area
  - Borough: 1.32 sq mi (3.41 km^{2})
  - Land: 1.31 sq mi (3.40 km^{2})
  - Water: 0.0039 sq mi (0.01 km^{2})
- Elevation: 322 ft (98 m)

Population (2020)
  - Borough: 6,132
  - Density: 4,675.1/sq mi (1,805.07/km^{2})
  - Metro: 865,310 (US: 68th)
- Time zone: UTC-5 (EST)
  - Summer (DST): UTC-4 (EDT)
- Zip Code: 18055
- Area codes: 610 and 484
- FIPS code: 42-33744
- Primary airport: Lehigh Valley International Airport
- Major hospital: Lehigh Valley Hospital–Cedar Crest
- School district: Saucon Valley
- Website: www.hellertownborough.org

Hellertown is a borough in Northampton County, Pennsylvania, United States. Its population was 6,131 at the 2020 census. Hellertown is part of the Lehigh Valley metropolitan area, which had a population of 861,899 and was the 68th-most populous metropolitan area in the U.S. as of 2020.

Lost River Caverns, a natural limestone cavern, are located in Hellertown.

== Geography ==
Hellertown is located at 40°35′3″N 75°20′17″W (40.584099, -75.338139). According to the U.S. Census Bureau, the borough has a total area of 1.3 square miles (3.4 km^{2}), all land.

== History ==
=== Pre-settlement ===
The area that is now Hellertown was inhabited by the Lenape people.

=== 18th century ===
Hellertown was founded in 1742 by Johann Christoph(er) Heller and his son Johann Simon Heller. The family was a group of Palatines who left Rotterdam on September 5, 1738, and landed in Philadelphia. Christopher obtained the patent for his land on September 8, 1742, and Simon received his patent on October 14, 1746. Together they owned a 176-acre property at the southern foot of the Lehigh Mountain along the Saucon Creek and constructed the family plantation named "Delay".

=== 19th century ===
In 1820, the town contained thirteen houses, eighteen families, three taverns, two stores, one grist-mill, and seventy-three inhabitants. The town specialized in the production of linseed oil. The first school in Hellertown was built in 1845 following the donation of a plot of land by resident John Rentzheimer. Prior to this all schooling was performed on a rotation basis in local homes.

In the late 1840s, the town would shift from a small farming community to a burgeoning industrial center, with coal yards being built in 1848, and the Lower Saucon Ironworks opening in 1849. This growth was expedited in 1856 the North Pennsylvania Railroad was built through Hellertown and Rudolphus Kent, of Gwynedd, purchased a plot of land to build a rail station. The small wooden station would be demolished in favor of a larger stone one in 1868. In 1858, the town's first newspaper, The Hellertown Telegraph began publication, but would only last a year before shutting its doors. In 1866, a large iron foundry was constructed by the Lower Saucon Ironworks. It was joined by the Saucon Savings bank in 1871, and a steel foundry in 1872. A Planing mill was built in 1874 and a furniture factory and flour mill in 1875.

In 1870, the original school house built in 1845 was purchased and turned into an Evangelical Church, the first church in the town, prior to which all religious services where held on a rotational basis in people's houses. Since 1867, the town has had an Odd Fellows lodge, and they were joined in October 1869 by the second ever chapter of the Sons of Hermann.

In 1874, the first cemetery in the town was started, the Union Cemetery. In 1875, the town's second newspaper, The Saucon Advertiser was founded, but it would close in just a few months. That year Hellertown consisted of five stores, two hardware stores, one drug store, two carriage factories, one foundry, one grist-mill, one saw-mill, one planing-mill, two furnace stacks, three hotels, coal and lumber yard, furniture manufactory, a town hall, a bank, two churches, and a population of almost 1,000.

== Government and politics ==
In the 2016 Presidential election, Donald Trump won the borough with 1,349 votes to 1,281 votes in favor of Hillary Clinton. In the 2020 Presidential election, Joe Biden won with 1,648 votes to Donald Trump's 1,572 votes.

=== Legislators ===
- State Representative Robert L. Freeman, Democrat, 136th district
- State Senator Lisa Boscola, Democrat, 18th district
- U.S. Representative Ryan Mackenzie, Republican, 7th district

=== Chief Burgess ===
Like many other boroughs in Pennsylvania, Hellertown's highest executive historically was the Chief Burgess, a largely ceremonial office selected by members of the borough council amongst themselves to serve a one year term that was often reserved for the more senior members of the council.

| No. | Name | Term | Party | Notes |
|---|---|---|---|---|
| 1. | Thomas R. Laubach | | | Tinsmith and stove dealer elected the first Chief Burgess. |
| | Milton Hess | | | Brother of Jeremiah. Local businessman. |
| | Jeremiah S. Hess | | | Brother of Milton. Local businessman. |
| | A.J. Harris | | | Owner of the first Drug Store in the borough. |
| | George B. Deemer | | | Owner of a stone quarry that most of the borough used to build structures. |
| | Charles J. Waidner | | | Northampton County commissioner and veterinarian. |
| | James Wagner | | | Owner of a gist mill. |
| | Morris J. Dimmick | 1925 - 1945 | | Vice President of Guerber Engineering from 1930 to 1960. |

=== Mayors ===
| No. | Name | Term | Party | Notes |
|---|---|---|---|---|
| | Howard Hess | 1946-1949 | | Descendant of Thomas R. Laubach, Northampton county commissioner, restored and preserved the original borough jail. |
| | Emerson Mills | 1969-1981 | | Served three terms until his defeat in 1981. |
| | Donald C. Zimpfer | 1985-1993 | Democratic | Spent eight years on the borough council before becoming mayor. Defeated in the Democratic primaries. |
| | Ben Muschlitz | 1993-1997 | Democratic | Longtime borough councilmen, engaged in a corruption scandal at the end of his term. Attempted to merge Hellertown and Lower Saucon Township. |
| | Richard Fluck | 1997-2017 | Democratic | Spent 28 years on the borough council, and 20 years as mayor. |
| | David Heintzelman | 2017-present | Democratic | Local funeral home owner and prominent local businessman. |

== Demographics ==
Historical population
| Census | Pop. | Note | %± |
|---|---|---|---|
| 1880 | 605 | | — |
| 1890 | 708 | | 17.0% |
| 1900 | 745 | | 5.2% |
| 1910 | 915 | | 22.8% |
| 1920 | 3,008 | | 228.7% |
| 1930 | 3,851 | | 28.0% |
| 1940 | 4,031 | | 4.7% |
| 1950 | 5,435 | | 34.8% |
| 1960 | 6,716 | | 23.6% |
| 1970 | 6,615 | | −1.5% |
| 1980 | 6,025 | | −8.9% |
| 1990 | 5,662 | | −6.0% |
| 2000 | 5,606 | | −1.0% |
| 2010 | 5,898 | | 5.2% |
| 2020 | 6,132 | | 4.0% |

As of the census of 2000, there were 5,606 people, 2,448 households, and 1,571 families residing in the borough. The population density was 4,180.8 inhabitants per square mile (1,614.2/km^{2}). There were 2,570 housing units at an average density of 1,916.6 per square mile (740.0/km^{2}). The racial makeup of the borough was 98.20% White, 0.30% African American, 0.07% Native American, 0.20% Asian, 0.68% from other races, and 0.55% from two or more races. Hispanic or Latino of any race were 2.48% of the population.

There were 2,448 households, out of which 24.7% had children under the age of 18 living with them, 51.2% were married couples living together, 10.3% had a female householder with no husband present, and 35.8% were non-families. 30.5% of all households were made up of individuals, and 17.2% had someone living alone who was 65 years of age or older. The average household size was 2.29 and the average family size was 2.85.

In the borough, the population was distributed, with 20.2% under the age of 18, 6.6% from 18 to 24, 29.0% from 25 to 44, 21.2% from 45 to 64, and 23.1% who were 65 years of age or older. The median age was 42 years. For every 100 females there were 89.3 males. For every 100 females age 18 and over, there were 86.2 males.

The median income for a household in the borough was $39,651, and the median income for a family was $49,604. Males had a median income of $37,935 versus $26,322 for females. The per capita income for the borough was $20,119. About 4.1% of families and 4.6% of the population were below the poverty line, including 6.5% of those under age 18 and 3.3% of those age 65 or over.

== Transportation ==
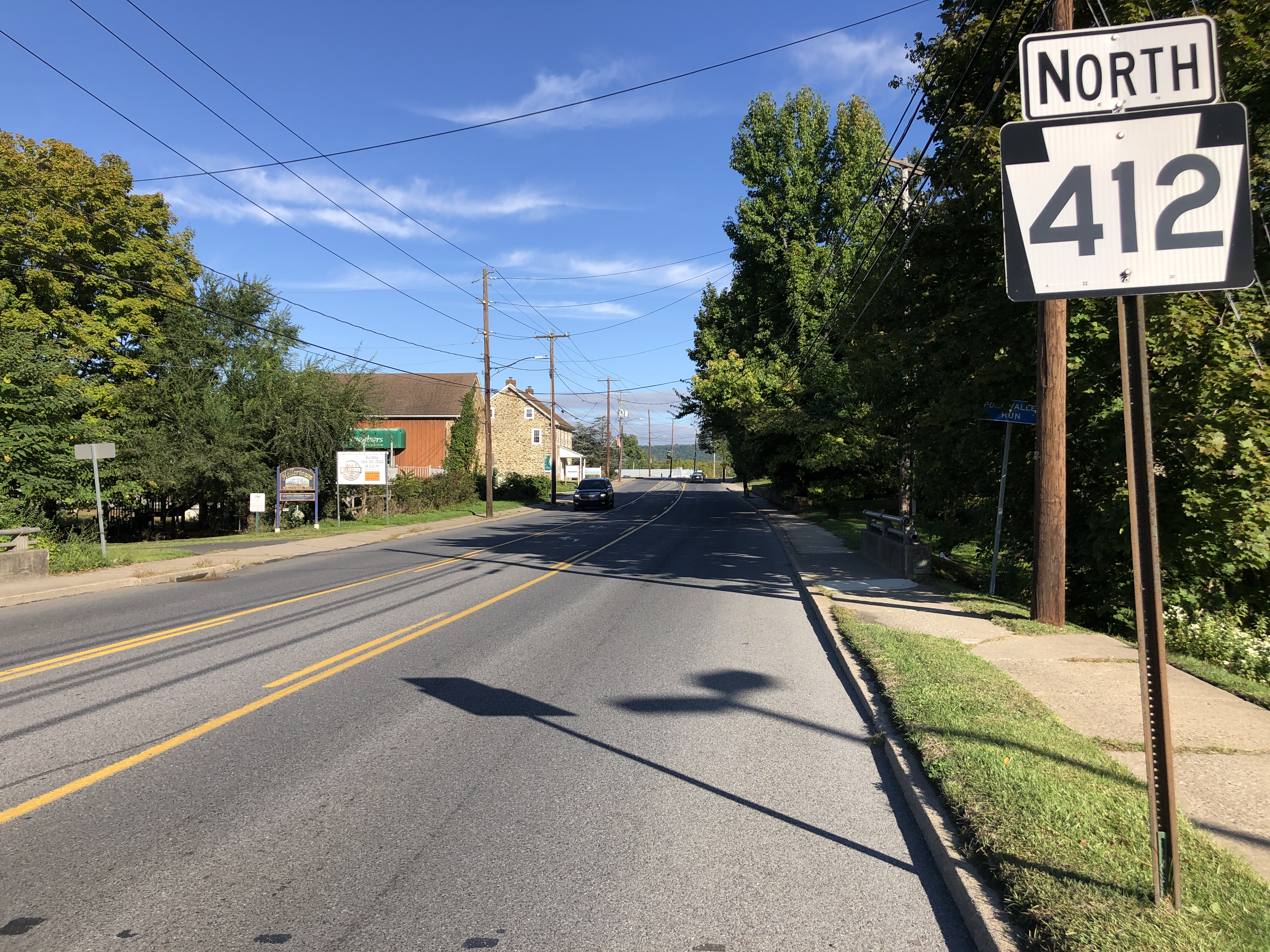
PA Route 412 in Hellertown

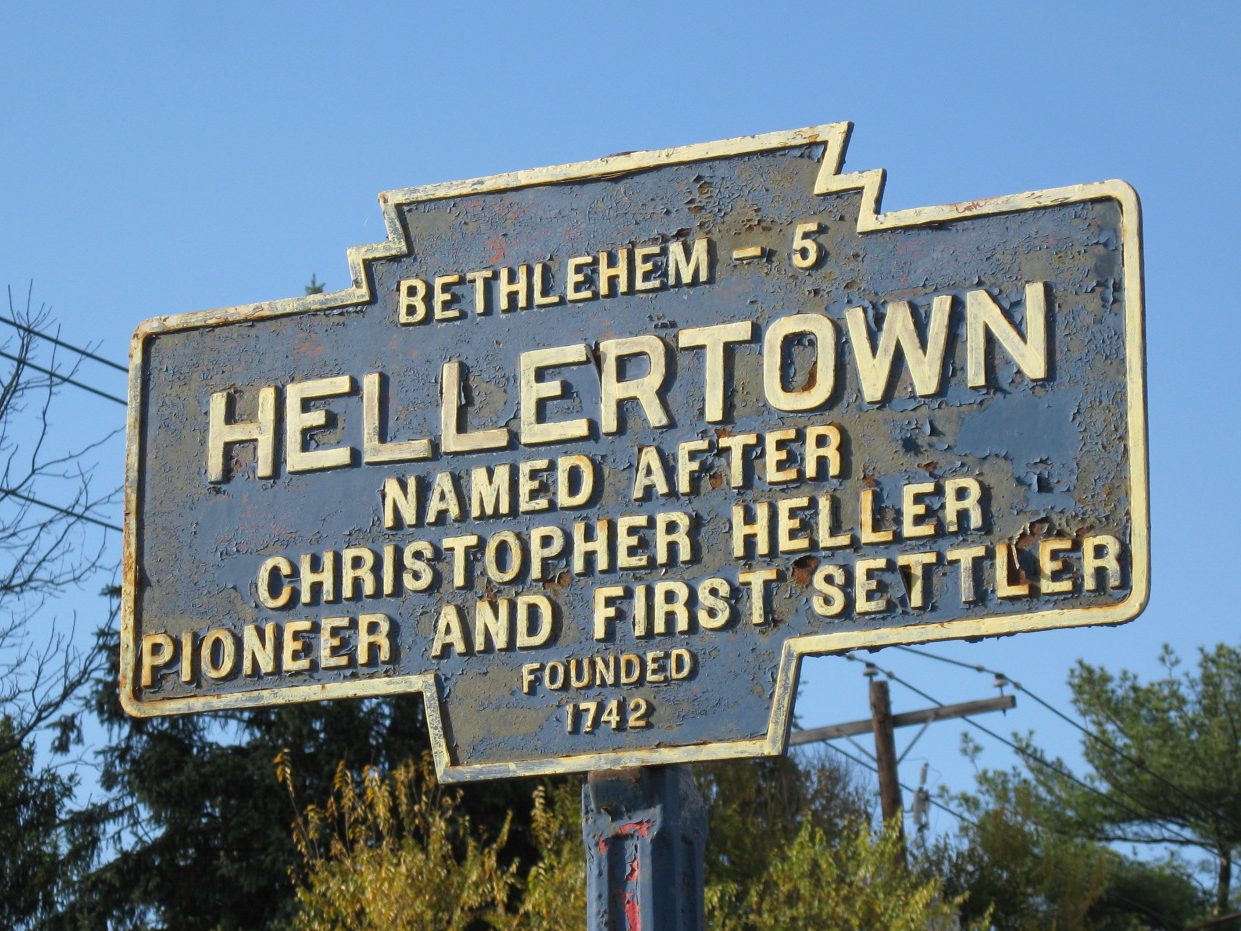
Keystone Marker for Hellertown, November 2009

As of 2010, there were 24.26 miles (39.04 km) of public roads in Hellertown, of which 3.58 miles (5.76 km) were maintained by the Pennsylvania Department of Transportation (PennDOT) and 20.68 miles (33.28 km) were maintained by the borough.

Pennsylvania Route 412 runs north-south through Hellertown on Main Street, heading north to Bethlehem and south into Bucks County, where it provides access to Pennsylvania Route 611. PA 412 has an interchange with Interstate 78 just outside the corporate limits of Hellertown, which heads west to Allentown and Harrisburg and east to Easton and New York City.

LANta provides bus service to Hellertown along Route 215, which provides service Monday-Saturday north to Bethlehem and Lehigh Valley International Airport, and Route 105, which provides Sunday service north to Bethlehem and the Lehigh Valley Mall. Klein Transportation and Trans-Bridge Lines provide bus service from Hellertown to New York City from a park and ride lot located at the interchange between I-78 and PA 412. Hellertown formerly had commuter rail service along SEPTA's Bethlehem Line north to Bethlehem and south to Philadelphia at Hellertown station, but service ended in 1981.

== Education ==
Hellertown and Lower Saucon Township are served by the Saucon Valley School District. Saucon Valley School District includes an elementary school, middle school, and Saucon Valley High School.

== Notable people ==
- Len Bilous, soccer player, coach, and co-founder of Vision Training Soccer Academy
- Carl Benjamin Boyer, historian
- Glenn Hetrick, special makeup effects artist and designer
- Sandy Koufax, Hall of Fame baseball player for the Los Angeles Dodgers, spends his summers in Hellertown.
- Eugene J. McGuinness, former Bishop of Oklahoma City-Tulsa
- Ted Poley, lead singer of rock band Danger Danger
- Allen Woodring, 1920 Summer Olympics gold medalist, 200 metres

== In popular culture ==
- Hellertown is mentioned in two Kurt Vonnegut's novels, Slaughterhouse-Five, published in 1969, and Breakfast of Champions, published in 1973.
- In the August 31, 2009, episode "Sin" on Solved on the Investigation Discovery network, the murder of Hellertown resident Rhonda Smith, who was found dead in Trinity Lutheran Church in Springfield Township, Pennsylvania, is explored.
