= Growth =

Growth may refer to:

== Biology ==
- Auxology, the study of all aspects of human physical growth
- Bacterial growth
- Cell growth
- Growth hormone, a peptide hormone that stimulates growth
- Human development (biology)
- Plant growth
- Secondary growth, growth that thickens woody plants
- A tumor or other such neoplasm

== Economics ==
- Economic growth, the increase in the inflation-adjusted market value of the goods and services
- Growth investing, a style of investment strategy focused on capital appreciation

== Mathematics ==
- Exponential growth, also called geometric growth
- Hyperbolic growth
- Linear growth, refers to two distinct but related notions
- Logistic growth, characterized as an S curve

== Social science ==
- Developmental psychology
- Erikson's stages of psychosocial development
- Human development (humanity)
- Personal development
- Population growth

== Other uses ==
- Growth (film), a 2010 American horror film
- Growth (EP), a 2021 EP by Olivia Dean
- Izaugsme (Growth), a Latvian political party
- Grown (album), by 2PM

== See also ==
- Grow (disambiguation)
- Growth curve (disambiguation)
- Growth impairment (disambiguation)
- Growth industry (disambiguation)
- Growth model (disambiguation)
- Growth rate (disambiguation)
- Growth regulator (disambiguation)
