= Growing =

Growing may refer to:

- Growth (disambiguation)
- Growing (band), an American noise band
- Growing (Rina Chinen album), 1998
- Growing (Sleeping People album), 2007
- Growing, a 1961 autobiographical book by Leonard Woolf

== See also ==
- Grow (disambiguation)
