= Bethlehem Area Vocational-Technical School =

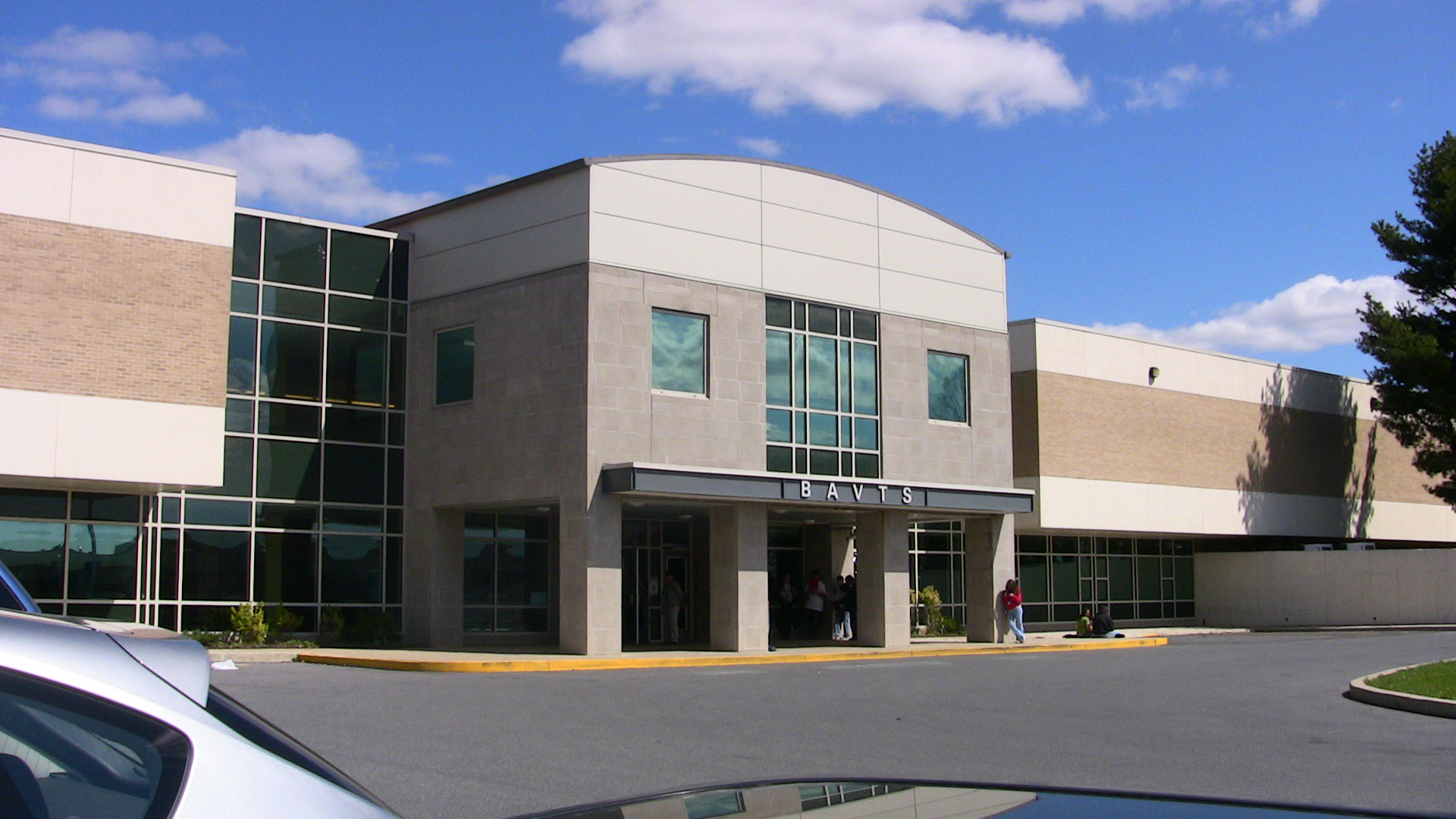
- Bethlehem Area Vocational-Technical School in April 2008

Location
- 3300 Chester Avenue; Bethlehem, Pennsylvania 18020; United States; 40.6646°N 75.3341°W

Information
- Type: Career and technical school
- Established: 1965
- School district: Bethlehem, Northampton, and Saucon Valley School Districts
- NCES School ID: 428037007083
- Faculty: 37.5 (as of 2023-24)
- Grades: 10-12
- Enrollment: 12 (as of 2023-24)
- Student to teacher ratio: 0.32
- Campus type: Suburban
- Colours: Blue and white
- Slogan: Navigate Your Future!
- Nickname: BAVTS
- Feeder schools: Liberty High School, Freedom High School, Northampton Area High School, Saucon Valley High School
- Website: www.bethlehemavts.org

The Bethlehem Area Vocational-Technical School is a career and technical school located in Bethlehem, Pennsylvania in the Lehigh Valley region of eastern Pennsylvania. The school was founded in 1965 when Bethlehem Area School District, Northampton Area School District, and Saucon Valley School District combined resources to form one vocational-technical school for its students to attend.

As of the 2023-24 school year, the school had 12 students and 37.5 classroom teachers on an FTE basis for a student–teacher ratio of 0.32, according to National Center for Education Statistics data.

== History ==
=== 20th century ===
The beginning of vocational education in the Bethlehem area began in 1918 when the Vocational Shop Program was started and located on East Fourth Street, where the South Side Boy's Club is now housed. From 1919 to 1934, a program named the Trade School was housed on Fourth Street in Bethlehem's Excelsior Building.

There was also a Vocational Industrial Department located in Liberty High School from 1922 to 1934. In 1934, that school housed seventh to twelfth grades; consequently, the Industrial Department was relocated to Broughal and Excelsior streets. Between 1934 and 1940, academic grades from ninth to twelfth were housed at Broughal along with drafting, cabinetmaking, pattern and printing shops while carpentry, electrical, electronics and machining were housed at the Excelsior.

Bethlehem Technical High School was located at the Quinn Building for ninth to twelfth grades. It had 18 classrooms and 10 shops. The school even had its own graduation. In January 1956, vocational education was housed in the new annex building of Liberty High School, as a department. From 1956 to 1964, vocational education came under the supervision of the Liberty High School principal. In 1965, it was renamed to its current name, the Bethlehem Area Vocational-Technical School. In 1970, the school expended $3 million for the construction of its own building for the school, which built adjacent to Freedom High School in Bethlehem Township.

== Programs ==
Currently BAVTS has 27 career and technical programs, which include:

- Academy of engineering
- Academy of medical sciences
- Athletic health and fitness
- Auto collision
- Auto technician
- Baking
- Building trades
- Cabinetmaking
- Carpentry
- Commercial art
- Computer networking and telecommunications
- Cosmetology
- Culinary arts
- Electrical construction
- Electronic engineering and manufacturing
- Esthetician
- Fashion industries
- Graphic communications
- Health careers
- Heating ventilation and air conditioning
- Masonry
- Plumbing
- Precision machining
- Protective services
- Video and media arts
- Web design and development
- Welding technologies

== Clubs ==
Bethlehem Area Vocational-Technical School offers several options for club involvement. Some students are members of SkillsUSA and compete in their specific area of knowledge. Other clubs are affiliated with certain programs like Health Occupation Students of America is associated with the medical programs. Other clubs also include the National Technical Honor Society and MT6, the entrepreneurial club.

== Scholarships ==
BAVTS began a scholarship program in 2001 by the Bridges Foundation. The Bridges Foundation was founded by Walter J. Dealtry and BAVTS administration to raise funds for career and technical student scholarships. BAVTS Bridges Foundation scholarship funds are available for qualified BAVTS high school seniors. Qualifying students will have their tuition waived for Continuing Education courses that offer advanced training and certification.

== Continuing education ==
BAVTS' adult education department is the second-largest adult vocational-technical school in Pennsylvania as measured by the number of students completing courses. As a non-profit entity, the Continuing Education Department also shares teaching space and some essential core administrative services with Bethlehem Area Vocational-Technical School.
