= Grow =

Grow or GROW may refer to:

- Growth (disambiguation), an increase in some quantity over time or a measure of some principal
- GROW model, a technique for problem solving or goal setting
- Graphical ROMable Object Windows, a windowing system that was developed into the MarioNet split web browser

== People ==
- C. Scott Grow (born 1948), a general authority in The Church of Jesus Christ of Latter-day Saints
- Carol Grow (born 1971), American beauty queen, model, and actress
- Erica Grow, (born 1980), American meteorologist and television reporter
- Galusha A. Grow (1823–1907), American politician
- Henry Grow (1817–1891), American civil engineer
- Lloyd Grow (1903–1979), American football and basketball coach
- Malcolm C. Grow (1887–1960), first Surgeon General of the United States Air Force
- Matthew Grow (born 1977), American historian
- Monty Grow (born 1971), American football player
- Robert W. Grow (1895–1985), US Army officer
- Roy Grow (1941–2013), American professor of international relations
- GROW Vasu, Ayinoor Vasu (born 1930), Indian leader of the Gwalior Rayons Workers' Organisation (GROW)

== Places ==
- Grow, Texas
- Grow, Wisconsin

== Organizations ==
- GROW (support group), a mental health peer support group and mutual aid organization
- Grow (company), a financial technology company based in Vancouver, Canada
- Grow Jogos e Brinquedos, a Brazilian company that markets toys and board games

== Arts and entertainment ==
- The Grow, a 2012 Chinese film
- Grow (film), 2025 British family comedy film
- "Grow" (Law & Order: Criminal Intent), a television episode
- GROW (series), a series of Flash-based indie video games
- Grow (album), by Chon, 2015
- Grow, an EP by Kolby Koloff, or the title song, 2015
- "Grow" (Jeangu Macrooy song), 2020
- "Grow", a song by Andy Grammer from The Good Parts, 2017
- "Grow" (Conan Gray song), 2017
- "Grow", a song by Frances from Things I've Never Said, 2017
- "Grow", a song by Joakim Lundell, 2018
- "Grow", a song by Kubb from Mother, 2005
- "Grow", a song by MUNA from Saves the World, 2019

== See also ==
- Grower (disambiguation)
