= Nancy Run =

River in Pennsylvania, United States

- Etymology: An old fortune teller who lived near the creek

Physical characteristics
- Source
  - location: Near Green Pond Golf Course in Bethlehem Township, Pennsylvania, U.S.
  - elevation: 382 feet (116 m)
- Mouth
  - location: Lehigh River in Freemansburg, Pennsylvania, U.S.
  - coordinates: 40°37′55″N 75°20′00″W
  - elevation: 220 feet (67 m)
- Length: 4.1 mi (6.6 km)
- Basin size: 6.14 mi^{2} (15.9 km^{2})

Basin features
- Progression: Lehigh River → Delaware River → Delaware Bay
- Tributaries
  - left: One unnamed tributary

Nancy Run (also known as Nancys Run) is a tributary of the Lehigh River in Northampton County, Pennsylvania, in the United States. The creek is approximately 4.1 miles (6.6 km) long and flows through Bethlehem Township and Freemansburg. The stream's watershed has an area of approximately 6.14 square miles (15.9 km^{2}). It is classified as a Coldwater Fishery and a High-Quality Coldwater Fishery and has been home to trout and a diverse macroinvertebrate community.

== Course ==
Nancy Run begins near the Green Pond Golf Course in Bethlehem Township, Pennsylvania. It flows southwest for several tenths of a mile before turning south-southwest for several tenths of a mile, where it crosses Easton Avenue. The creek then receives an unnamed tributary from the left and turns west for some distance before entering the census-designated place of Middletown. It then flows south for a while before turning south-southwest and entering Freemansburg, Pennsylvania, where it flows south for a few tenths of a mile before reaching its confluence with the Lehigh River.

== Geography and geology ==
The elevation near the mouth of Nancy Run is 220 feet (67 m) above sea level. The elevation near the source of the stream is approximately 382 feet (116 m) above sea level.

The Lehigh Canal crosses Nancy Run.

Near Nancy Run, "one of the best" beds of stromatolitic Limeport beds in eastern Pennsylvania is exposed.

== Hydrology and watershed ==
The watershed of Nancy Run has an area of 6.14 square miles (15.9 km^{2}). The part of the watershed that lies above its unnamed tributary has an area of only 1.40 square miles (3.6 km^{2}). Nancy Run is entirely within the United States Geological Survey quadrangle of Nazareth.

At its mouth, the peak annual discharge of Nancy Run has a 10 percent chance of reaching 3,605 cubic feet per second (102.1 m^{3}/s). It has a 2 percent chance of reaching 4,019 cubic feet per second (113.8 m^{3}/s) and a 1 percent chance of reaching 4,291 cubic feet per second (121.5 m^{3}/s). The peak annual discharge has a 0.2 percent chance of reaching 4,547 cubic feet per second (128.8 m^{3}/s).

Above its unnamed tributary, the peak annual discharge of Nancy Run has a 10 percent chance of reaching 1,022 cubic feet per second (28.9 m^{3}/s). It has a 2 percent chance of reaching 1,153 cubic feet per second (32.6 m^{3}/s) and a 1 percent chance of reaching 1,216 cubic feet per second (34.4 m^{3}/s). The peak annual discharge has a 0.2 percent chance of reaching 1,297 cubic feet per second (36.7 m^{3}/s).

== History ==
Nancy Run was entered into the Geographic Names Information System on August 30, 1990 due to its presence on a 1975 county highway map published by the Pennsylvania Department of Transportation. Its identifier in the Geographic Names Information System is 1211971. The stream is also known as Nancys Run. This variant name appears in a 1939 geological survey of Northampton County by Benjamin L. Miller et al..

Nancy Run was named for an old woman named Nancy who historically lived in a log cabin on the creek and was well known as a fortune teller. In the early 1800s, there was a large tavern on the stream. The community of Freemansburg, which is located at the mouth of the stream, was incorporated in 1856.

Two steel stringer/multi-beam or girder bridges carrying Washington Street and Keystone Street were built over Nancy Run near Freemansburg in 1930. In 1938, a concrete culvert bridge carrying State Route 3007 was constructed over the stream. A steel stringer/multi-beam or girder bridge carrying Middletown Road was constructed over the creek in 1958, and in 1960, a prestressed box beam or girders bridge carrying State Route 3007 was built over the creek. Three concrete culvert bridges were built over Nancy Run in 2000; one carried Tenth Street in Nancy Run Estates and the other two carried Bridge Lane and Washington Street in the Emerald Hills Development.

In 2014, the Northampton County Conservation District received a $5000 grant from the Coldwater Heritage Partnership to develop a Coldwater Conservation Plan for the watershed of Nancy Run.

== Biology ==
Wild trout naturally reproduce in Nancy Run from its headwaters downstream to its mouth. Upstream of a State Route 3007 bridge, the creek's watershed is designated as a Coldwater Fishery and a Migratory Fishery. Below this point, it is designated as a High-Quality Coldwater Fishery and a Migratory Fishery. The stream is designated as Class A Wild Trout Waters for brown trout in its lower 1.6 miles (2.6 km).

In the 1990s, Nancy Run was found to support a benthic ecosystem of high biodiversity, including one sensitive species. The stream also supported a number of fish species. However, a proposed highway extension was believed to potentially impact biodiversity by releasing organic and inorganic pollutants into the stream, although they would not have been directly impacted by the construction.

Macroinvertebrate taxa found in Nancy Run in the 1970s include Oligochaeta, sowbugs, scuds, mayflies, caddisflies, beetles, Diptera (flies/midges), blackflies, and snails.

== See also ==
- Saucon Creek, next upstream tributary of the Lehigh River
- List of rivers of Pennsylvania
