= Liberty High School (Bethlehem, Pennsylvania) =

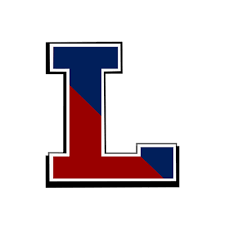

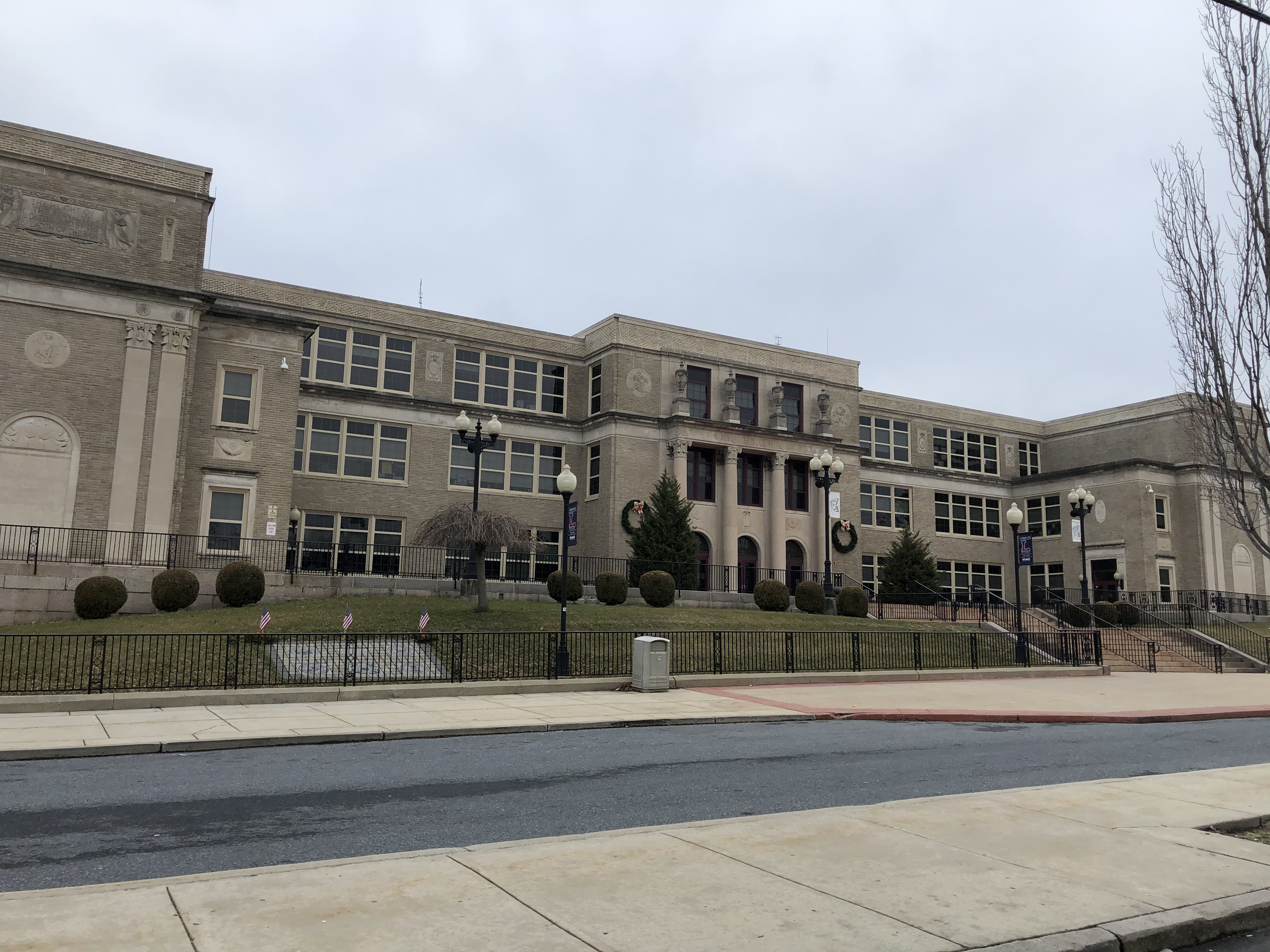
- Liberty High School in Bethlehem, Pennsylvania, February 2020

Location
- 1115 Linden Street; Bethlehem, Northampton and Lehigh, Pennsylvania 18018; United States; 40°37′46″N 75°22′17″W

Information
- Type: Public high school
- School district: Bethlehem Area School District
- Superintendent: Renato M. Lajara
- NCES School ID: 420357003465
- Principal: Brandon Horlick
- Teaching staff: 158.45 (on an FTE basis)
- Grades: 9th–12th
- Enrollment: 2,541 (2024–25)
- Student to teacher ratio: 16.04
- Campus type: Small City
- Colors: Burgundy and navy
- Fight song: Liberty Forever
- Athletics conference: Eastern Pennsylvania Conference
- Nickname: Hurricanes
- Rival: Bethlehem Catholic High School and Freedom High School
- Website: basdwpweb.beth.k12.pa.us/liberty/

Liberty High School is a large urban, public high school located in Bethlehem, Pennsylvania. Liberty is the larger of two public high schools in the Bethlehem Area School District; Freedom High School is the other. Liberty's current attendance area includes students from Bethlehem, Fountain Hill, Freemansburg, and Hanover Township. As of the 2024–25 school year, the school had an enrollment of 2,541 students, according to National Center for Education Statistics data.

Liberty High School students may choose to attend the Bethlehem Area Vocational-Technical School for training in the construction and mechanical trades. In 2015, the Bethlehem School District reported that over 1,000 Bethlehem Area pupils were enrolled in the vocational school's programs. The Colonial Intermediate Unit, IU20, provides the school with a wide variety of services like: specialized education for disabled students, state-mandated training on recognizing and reporting child abuse, speech and visual disability services, and criminal background check processing for prospective employees and professional development for staff and faculty.

Liberty High School holds football games and other sporting events at the Frank Banko Field at the Bethlehem Area School District Stadium, one of the state's largest high school football stadiums. Graduation takes place annually at Stabler Arena.

== History ==
=== 20th century ===
Liberty High School was built in 1918 and opened in 1922, following World War I. At the school's opening ceremony in May 1923, Liberty High School was dedicated to "the progressive spirit of the citizens of Bethlehem." In the ceremony, Liberty was cited as "one of the greatest achievements of the City of Bethlehem" and designed to not only "further the well-being of youth" but also to stand as a "War Memorial, commemorating the valor of Bethlehem men who went to the front, the sacrifice of the heroic dead and the manifold contributions and productions of the city toward bringing the war to swift and just conclusion." Liberty High School was given its name to cement this War Memorial status. It is located in the geographical center of Bethlehem, Pennsylvania, in the Lehigh Valley region of the state.

Liberty High School served all of Bethlehem until Freedom High School was built. Following the opening of Freedom High School, Center City Bethlehem, Pembroke Village, and South Side residents in Bethlehem attended Liberty while Bethlehem Township and Hanover Township residents went to Freedom. Adjustments have since been made to these borders, and Liberty now has students from Hanover, Center City, Pembroke, and some of South Side with some South Side residents attending Freedom High School.

Up until Liberty's recent remodel, the school was composed of three classroom buildings, two buildings with four floors and one science center with two. Over the years, several renovations have been performed on the school, with the most recent being an overhaul of the main building, along with the construction of a new student activity center.

=== 21st century ===
Liberty High School's Main building, known as the Common's Building, is currently home to the Freshman Center. It is a new program established in 2013 meant to help freshmen make the transition into high school a little easier. Students there are now following a different schedule than the 10th to 12th graders attending Liberty. All freshmen take classes in the 2nd and 3rd floor of the commons building and travel for gym, business and sciences classes. It was developed due to the fact that freshmen sometimes struggle academically with the transition from middle school to high school.

== Athletics ==
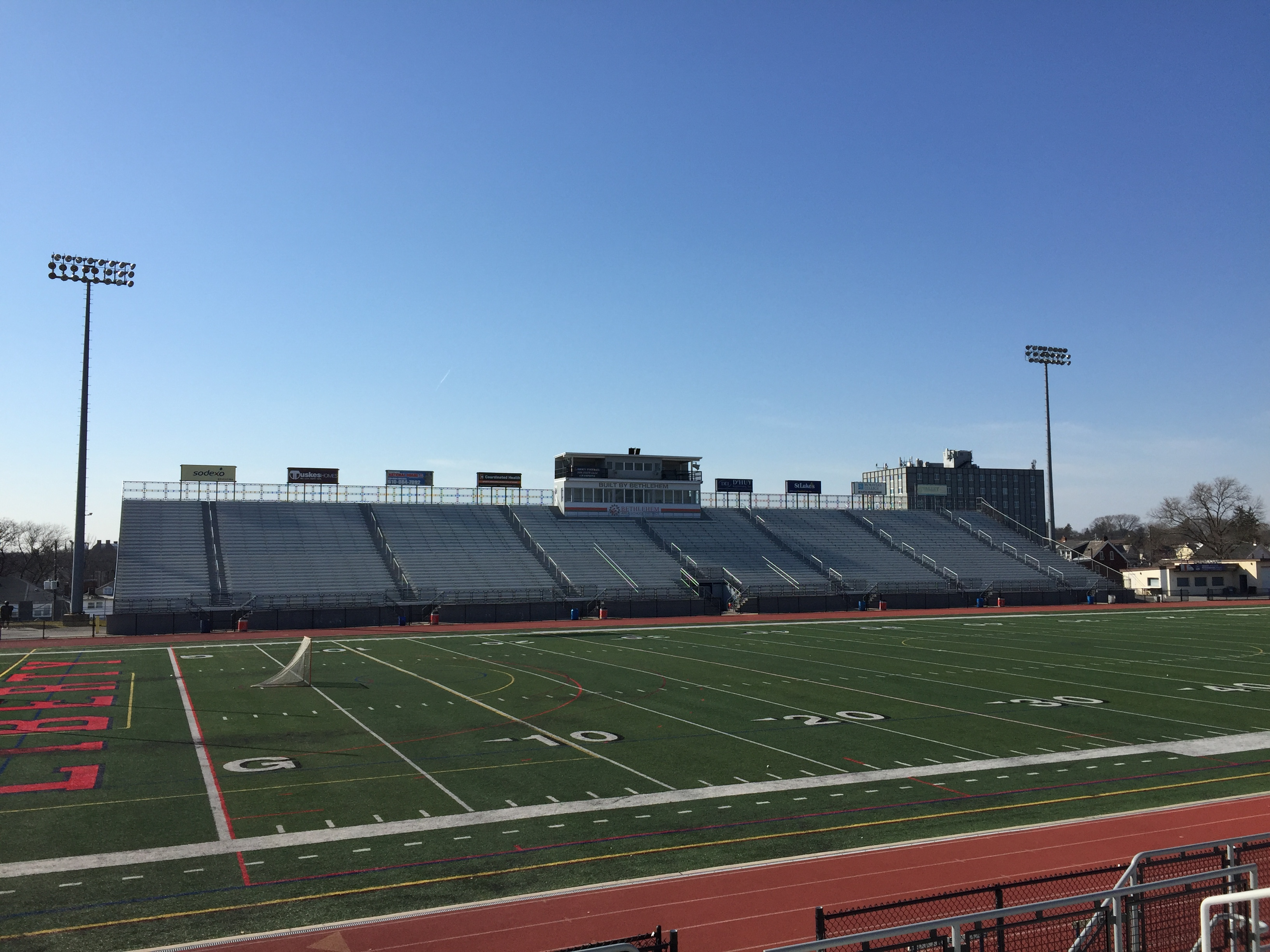
Liberty High School's football team plays their home games at BASD Stadium, a 14,000 capacity stadium in Bethlehem that is one of the largest high school stadiums in the state

The school's athletic teams compete in the Eastern Pennsylvania Conference, one of the premier high school athletic conferences in the nation that includes large high schools from Allentown, Easton, Emmaus, and other Lehigh Valley locations.

Liberty High School sports include cheerleading (non-competitive and competitive), baseball, field hockey, boys and girls soccer, boys and girls track and field, boys and girls basketball, football, softball, boys and girls volleyball, Co-ed golf, boys and girls swimming, rifle, ice hockey, boys and girls tennis, girls and boys lacrosse, wrestling, and boys and girls cross country. In December 2008, the Liberty High School varsity football team won the Pennsylvania 4A State Championship.

Liberty High School has the fifth-most Eastern Pennsylvania Conference championships in all sports, behind Parkland High School, Emmaus High School, Easton Area High School, and Allentown Central Catholic High School.

Liberty High School, Freedom High School, and Bethlehem Catholic High School play at Frank Banko Field at Bethlehem Area School District Stadium, a 12,000 capacity high school football stadium that is one of the largest in the state.

In 2022, Liberty High School's baseball team placed second in Pennsylvania's 6A-level state tournament.

=== Grenadier Band ===
The Liberty High School Grenadier Band is the official marching band of the school. The band is unique in that is uses the format for military bands in the British Army's Household Division, a format it began using in 1967. Since then, it has been adapted and made suitable for the American high school marching bands with the addition of Sousaphones, Mellophones, Baritone horns and fewer trumpets. The band was originally founded as the Bethlehem High School Band in 1926. At that time, the school was one of its kind since it opened in 1922. After the school's name change in 1966, the band began to orient itself towards the Coldstream Guards by issuing new uniforms and creating a pipe band, which resembles the Scots Guards. As of 2019, the LHSGB consists of 300 students which, besides the bagpipe section, includes a color guard, majorettes, corps of drums, fanfare trumpeters, and a drum major.

In 2016, the Grenadier Band was featured in a PBS39 documentary, Second to None: Liberty High School Grenadier Band. The documentary follows the historic legacy of the band, as well as the process by which the band conducts itself every year.

== Notable alumni ==
- David Bader, computer scientist and data science director, New Jersey Institute of Technology
- Thomas Baron, former Apollo 1 whistleblower
- Chuck Bednarik, former professional football player, Philadelphia Eagles, Pro Football Hall of Fame member
- Pete Carril, former basketball coach, Princeton University, Basketball Hall of Fame member
- Alexandra Chando, actress, CBS's As the World Turns and ABC's The Lying Game
- Jimmy DeGrasso, drummer, Alice Cooper band; former drummer, Megadeth
- Ted Deutch, former U.S. Congressman
- Martin C. Faga, former director, National Reconnaissance Office
- Peter Feaver, former special advisor for strategic planning and institutional reform, U.S. National Security Council
- Jonathan Frakes, actor and director, William Riker in Star Trek: The Next Generation
- Murray H. Goodman, real estate developer
- Erica Grow, meteorologist, WPIX in New York City
- Mike Hartenstine, former professional football player, Chicago Bears and Minnesota Vikings
- Darrun Hilliard, professional basketball player with Pınar Karşıyaka, formerly with Detroit Pistons and San Antonio Spurs
- Loren Keim, real estate author and magazine editor
- Gary Lavelle, former professional baseball player, Oakland Athletics, San Francisco Giants and Toronto Blue Jays
- Barry W. Lynn, political activist and former executive director, Americans United for Separation of Church and State
- Zora Martin-Felton, former education director, Smithsonian Institution
- J. J. Maura, former voiceover artist and television announcer, WCAU and QVC
- Matt McBride, former professional baseball player, Colorado Rockies and Oakland Athletics
- Paul McHale, former assistant secretary of Defense for Homeland Security and former Member of Congress
- Billy Packer, former college basketball television sportscaster, CBS Sports
- Dan Persa, former quarterback, Northwestern Wildcats, who finished his college career with the highest completion percentage in the NCAA
- Leo Prendergast, former head football coach, Lehigh University, and Bethlehem Bulldogs
- James J. Reed, former head coach, United States men's national soccer team
- Thom Schuyler, country music songwriter and member, Nashville Songwriters Hall of Fame
- Bill Shuey, outside linebackers coach, Jacksonville Jaguars
- Sheetal Sheth, actress, Looking for Comedy in the Muslim World
- Devin Street, former professional football player, Dallas Cowboys, Houston Texans, Indianapolis Colts, New England Patriots, and New York Jets
- David Zinczenko, diet author, editor of Men's Health magazine
