= Major League Baseball luxury tax =

Competitive balance tax in Major League Baseball

Major League Baseball (MLB) has a luxury tax called the Competitive Balance Tax (CBT). In place of a salary cap, the competitive balance tax regulates the total sum of money a given team can spend on their roster. Salary caps are common across professional sports leagues in the United States. Without these measures, teams would not be restricted on the amount of money spent on players' salaries. Therefore, teams with greater funding or revenue would possess a competitive advantage in their ability to attract top talent via higher salaries.

MLB first implemented the competitive balance tax in 1997 to reduce anti-competitive behavior in the league. The collective bargaining agreement (CBA) between MLB and the Major League Baseball Players Association (MLBPA), the labor union representing the players, sets the competitive balance tax thresholds for its duration. Unlike some other professional sports leagues, MLB allows teams to go over the threshold; however, doing so results in the team being charged a penalty on all overages.

Currently, the luxury tax increases based on the number of consecutive seasons above the CBT threshold, but this was not always the case. If a club "dips below the luxury tax threshold for a season, the penalty level is reset." In addition to the luxury tax, teams also must pay surcharges for exceeding certain thresholds starting with the 2016 CBA.

The primary goal of the CBT is to encourage a competitive balance amongst teams while allowing big spending on players. The CBT threshold/tax rates have undergone several changes since 1997.

== History ==
=== 1997–1999 ===
The 1994 Major League Baseball season was cut short due to the Major League Baseball strike. A primary source of conflict leading up to the strike was the tremendous power club owners had over the salaries of players on their respective teams. Small market teams felt handcuffed by their relatively anemic budgets while players from larger market teams were unwilling to accept the substantial pay cuts that a salary cap would likely have imposed. This resulted in a compromise in the 1996 collective bargaining agreement, which imposed Major League Baseball's first luxury tax.

The first agreement stated that the top five salary teams in each year would pay a 34% fine on each dollar a team spent beyond halfway between the salaries of the fifth and sixth teams. For example, if the fifth-highest salary team had a payroll of $100 million and the sixth-highest salary team had a payroll of $98 million, the top five teams would pay 34% on each dollar they spent over $99 million. Following is the amount each team paid from 1997 to 1999, when this system was in place:

Team	1997	1998	1999	Total
Baltimore Orioles	$4,030,228	$3,138,621	$3,475,048	$10,643,897
New York Yankees	$4,431,180	$684,390	$4,804,081	$9,919,651
Los Angeles Dodgers	$0	$49,593	$2,663,079	$2,712,672
Boston Red Sox	$0	$2,184,734	$21,226	$2,205,960
Cleveland Indians	$2,069,496	$0	$0	$2,065,496
Atlanta Braves	$1,299,957	$495,625	$0	$1,795,582
New York Mets	$0	$0	$1,137,992	$1,137,992
Florida Marlins	$139,607	$0	$0	$139,607
Total	$11,966,468	$6,552,963	$12,101,426	$30,618,857

=== 2003–2021 ===
After being temporarily eliminated from 2000 to 2002, the luxury tax returned under a new system with the passing of the 2002 collective bargaining agreement (and thus became effective with the 2003 season) and continued from then on with various tweaks with each CBA, such as increasing the thresholds and changing the tax rates. Instead of putting a level between the fifth and sixth teams, the 2002 CBA set a universal threshold that a team could not pass without a fee. Thus teams would only get punished if they surpassed this threshold, rather than if they were in the top five in the year for salary, which meant any number of teams could pay the luxury tax each year. Additionally, the 2016 CBA introduced surcharge thresholds.

==== Thresholds ====
Year	Threshold
2003	$117 million
2004	$120.5 million
2005	$128 million
2006	$136.5 million
2007	$148 million
2008	$155 million
2009	$162 million

Year	Threshold
2010	$170 million
2011	$178 million
2012	$178 million
2013	$178 million
2014	$189 million
2015	$189 million
2016	$189 million

Year	Tax threshold	First surcharge	Second surcharge
2017	$195 million	$215 million	$235 million
2018	$197 million	$217 million	$237 million
2019	$206 million	$226 million	$246 million
2020	$208 million	$228 million	$248 million
2021	$210 million	$230 million	$250 million

==== Tax rates ====
Just as with the old system, teams would have to pay a percentage of every dollar their payroll exceeded the set threshold. The 2002 CBA introduced a progressive taxation system. The 2006 CBA continued to refine the system, introducing the concept of needing to surpass the threshold in consecutive years for the penalty to increase, meaning if a team falls below the threshold one year the penalty resets the next year to the first-level penalty. The 2012 CBA, after seeing teams go over more than three times, added a fourth taxation level when teams went over the limit four or more times. The 2016 CBA removed this fourth tier, opting instead to raise the third tier's tax rate. The 2016 CBA also added two surcharge thresholds, with teams paying surcharge rates on top of the luxury tax owed. The surcharge rate for teams over the threshold from 2017–2021 was 12% for the first threshold, and 45% (or 42.5% if a first-time CBT payer) for the second.

Tax rates by year, 2003–2011
Year	Seasons over threshold		
Year	1	2	3+
2003	17.5%		
2004	22.5%	30%	
2005	22.5%	30%	40%
	Consecutive seasons over threshold		
	1	2	3+
2006	0%	30%	40%
2007–2011	22.5%	30%	40%

Tax rates for teams over CBT threshold 2012
Consecutive seasons over threshold	Tax rate
1	20%
2	30%
3	40%
4 or more	42.5%

Tax rates for teams over CBT threshold 2013–2016
Consecutive seasons over threshold	Tax rate
1	17.5%
2	30%
3	40%
4 or more	50%

Tax rates for teams over CBT threshold 2017–2021
Consecutive seasons over threshold	Tax rate
1	20%
2	30%
3 or more	50%

==== Tax paid per team ====
From 2003 to 2021, at least one team surpassed the tax threshold each year; only ten different teams passed the threshold in that period. Below is a breakdown of how much each team paid for that period:

Team	Years surpassed	Total tax paid
New York Yankees	2003–2017, 2019–2020	$348 million
Los Angeles Dodgers	2013–2017, 2021	$151.7 million
Boston Red Sox	2004–2007, 2010–2011, 2015–2016, 2018–2019	$51.1 million
Chicago Cubs	2016, 2019–2020	$14.0 million
Detroit Tigers	2008, 2016–2017	$9.0 million
San Francisco Giants	2015–2017	$8.8 million
Washington Nationals	2017–2018	$3.84 million
Houston Astros	2020	$3.1 million
Los Angeles Angels	2004	$927,059
Philadelphia Phillies	2021	$865,906

=== 2022–present ===
The 2022 CBA introduced three separate surcharge thresholds that increased on an annual basis. Additionally, any team with a payroll above the second surcharge threshold has its first draft pick moved back 10 places in the draft order, although if the team's first pick is among the top six picks, the penalty will apply to the team's second-highest pick.

==== Thresholds ====
Year	Tax threshold	First surcharge	Second surcharge	Third surcharge
2022	$230 million	$250 million	$270 million	$290 million
2023	$233 million	$253 million	$273 million	$293 million
2024	$237 million	$257 million	$277 million	$297 million
2025	$241 million	$261 million	$281 million	$301 million
2026	$244 million	$264 million	$284 million	$304 million

==== Tax rates and surcharges ====
Tax rates for teams over CBT threshold
Consecutive seasons over threshold	Tax rate
1	20%
2	30%
3 or more	50%

Surcharges for teams over surcharge thresholds
First	Second	Third
12%	45% (42.5% if first-time CBT payer)	60%

==== Teams ====
From 2022 onwards, at least one team surpassed the tax threshold each year. 2023 saw a then-record-breaking eight teams exceed the luxury tax threshold, which was then surpassed the following year when nine teams exceeded the luxury tax. Nine teams again exceeded the luxury tax threshold in 2025. Below is a breakdown of how much each team paid during the 2022 through 2025 seasons.

Team	2022	2023	2024	2025
Los Angeles Dodgers	$32,397,344	$19,423,297	$103,016,896	$169,375,768
New York Mets	$30,773,938	$100,781,932	$97,115,609	$91,637,501
New York Yankees	$9,681,093	$32,399,366	$62,512,111	$61,774,820
Philadelphia Phillies	$2,882,657	$6,977,345	$14,351,954	$56,062,903
San Diego Padres	$1,524,638	$39,693,954	$0	$6,992,447
Boston Red Sox	$1,229,936	$0	$0	$1,496,828
Texas Rangers	$0	$1,827,142	$10,807,196	$190,483
Toronto Blue Jays	$0	$5,535,492	$0	$13,609,719
Atlanta Braves	$0	$3,159,536	$14,026,496	$0
Houston Astros	$0	$0	$6,483,041	$1,497,438
San Francisco Giants	$0	$0	$2,421,788	$0
Chicago Cubs	$0	$0	$570,309	$0

=== Allocation of taxes paid ===
On December 2 in each contract year, the Commissioner's Office notifies every team that exceeded the tax threshold that they must pay their tax by January 21 of the following calendar year. The Commissioner's Office then redistributes this money according to a process defined by the CBA.

==== 2002–2016 ====
The first $2,375,400 is used to fund player benefits under the Major League Baseball Players Benefit Plan Agreements. Half of the remaining proceeds collected, with accrued interest, will also be used to fund player benefits under the Major League Baseball Players Benefit Plan Agreements. A quarter of the remaining proceeds, with accrued interest, will be contributed to the Industry Growth Fund and used for the purposes set out in Article XXV. The last quarter of the remaining proceeds, with accrued interest, shall be used to defray clubs' funding obligations arising from the Major League Baseball Players Benefit Plan Agreements.

==== 2017–2021 ====
The first $13 million will be used to defray clubs' funding obligations under the MLB Players Benefits Agreements. Half of the remaining sum is then used, with accrued interest, to fund the players' individual retirement accounts under the MLB Players Benefits Plan Agreements. The other half of the remaining sum is then distributed to clubs that did not exceed that year's tax threshold.

==== 2022–present ====
The first $3.5 million funds player benefits. Half of the remaining sum is then used to fund contributions to MLBPA players' individual retirement accounts. The other half of the remaining sum is then distributed by the commissioner to payee clubs that have grown their non-media net local revenue over a multi-year period. This incentivizes clubs to increase ticket sales, fan engagement, and other revenue generators that most likely rely on increasing payroll, rather than under the old system which allowed teams to not increase payroll and still collect from tax payers.

== Other revenue sharing policies ==
With the 2002 CBA, the MLB introduced revenue sharing in an attempt to further level the playing field. Each team sends in 31% of their local net revenues into a putative pool. Local net revenue is described as gross revenue from ticket sales, concessions, etc. minus central revenue from television and radio deals minus actual stadium expenses. This pool will then be distributed equally to all 30 teams, regardless of how much each paid. Teams that paid more than they were distributed are labeled as payors, and teams that received more than they contributed are labeled as payees. This system is a direct way for poorer teams to get more money from the richer teams to level the competitive balance.

The 2017 CBA increased this percentage from 31% to 48%. The 2022 CBA added draft penalties. Revenue-sharing payees cannot receive a top six pick three years in a row and revenue-sharing payors cannot receive a top six pick twice in a row. Teams that fall into either of these two categories cannot have a draft pick better than tenth in their affected year.

== Reception ==
The effectiveness of this tax is still uncertain among MLB owners, as they take different approaches to the situation. Because of increasing tax levels when the cap is exceeded in consecutive years, there is an incentive to reset to the year one tax rate. That increasing incremental penalty can affect a team's decision regarding whether to retain a key player when they are already over the threshold, as they may be averse to paying a substantial fee. Some owners have stated that they will spend whatever they want as long as it is beneficial to the team, whereas others admit that it can handicap the team a lot in the long run.

== Efficacy ==
The efficacy can be viewed in two different ways. As the years have gone on, the tax payments have increased into substantial amounts. According to USA Today Sports, more teams have come close to or surpassed the tax threshold in recent years as salaries have risen, especially in the past few seasons, despite owners wanting to stay below the tax threshold. However, in 2015, teams in the middle of the payroll pack won playoff games, as well as the World Series, as none of the teams that went over the tax threshold won a playoff series. This contrasts strongly with the dominance of the Atlanta Braves and New York Yankees dynasties in the 1990s. Despite the success in 2015, the efficacy could be an outlier. According to FiveThirtyEight's Noah Davis and Michael Lopez, despite the new system, cash buys more wins now than it did in the past. They also point out that some teams see decreasing or inverse returns when they spend more, indicating that money is just one variable in wins.

The commissioner's office has a stated desire for a competitive balance in professional sports. It could be problematic for the same handful of teams to be successful every year because perennially failing teams could go bankrupt (making the league's total market smaller). A 2013 study in the Academy of Business Research Journal showed a positive relationship between all 30 MLB teams' winning percentage, team salaries, operating income, operating profit margin, gross profit, and team revenue from 2002–2010. This study appears to show that there is no difference in average profits after a payroll increase, but there is a significant increase in winning percentage associated with an increase in payroll. Based on these assumptions, teams may spend as they have to help their teams win, and general managers will prioritize wins over profits, allowing teams with more favorable revenue situations to spend more, and win more, leading to an ever-expanding imbalance.

The first obvious impact of Major League Baseball's luxury tax is that it artificially deflates player salaries relative to the open market, which may increase owner profits. This approach is justified by a 2009 working paper from the University of Zurich. The paper develops a game-theory model that addresses the effects of a luxury tax on competitive balance, team profits, and social welfare. This model has half the teams above a certain tax threshold, and the other half below. The teams above pay taxable balances from their "excess" revenue, and those funds are redistributed to the teams below. This research argues that the smaller-revenue teams could sustain larger salaries than before the tax was implemented, but that larger-revenue teams would not be affected substantially by the system. In other words, the paper argues that total player salaries across the league are counterintuitively increased by the system. The authors argue that the luxury tax competitive balance system helps the players, improves social welfare, and helps the fans of Major League Baseball.

The MLBPA strongly disputes this conclusion. The MLBPA has attempted to push back against the luxury tax system during each periodic renegotiation of their collective bargaining agreement since the tax was first implemented. In the union's view, the luxury tax system is fundamentally designed to limit the earnings of players by functioning as a stealth salary cap.
