= Growth curve =

Growth curve can refer to:

- Growth curve (statistics), an empirical model of the evolution of a quantity over time.
- Growth curve (biology), a statistical growth curve used to model a biological quantity.
- Curve of growth (astronomy), the relation between the equivalent width and the optical depth.
