= Butztown, Pennsylvania =

Unincorporated community in Pennsylvania, US

- Unincorporated community
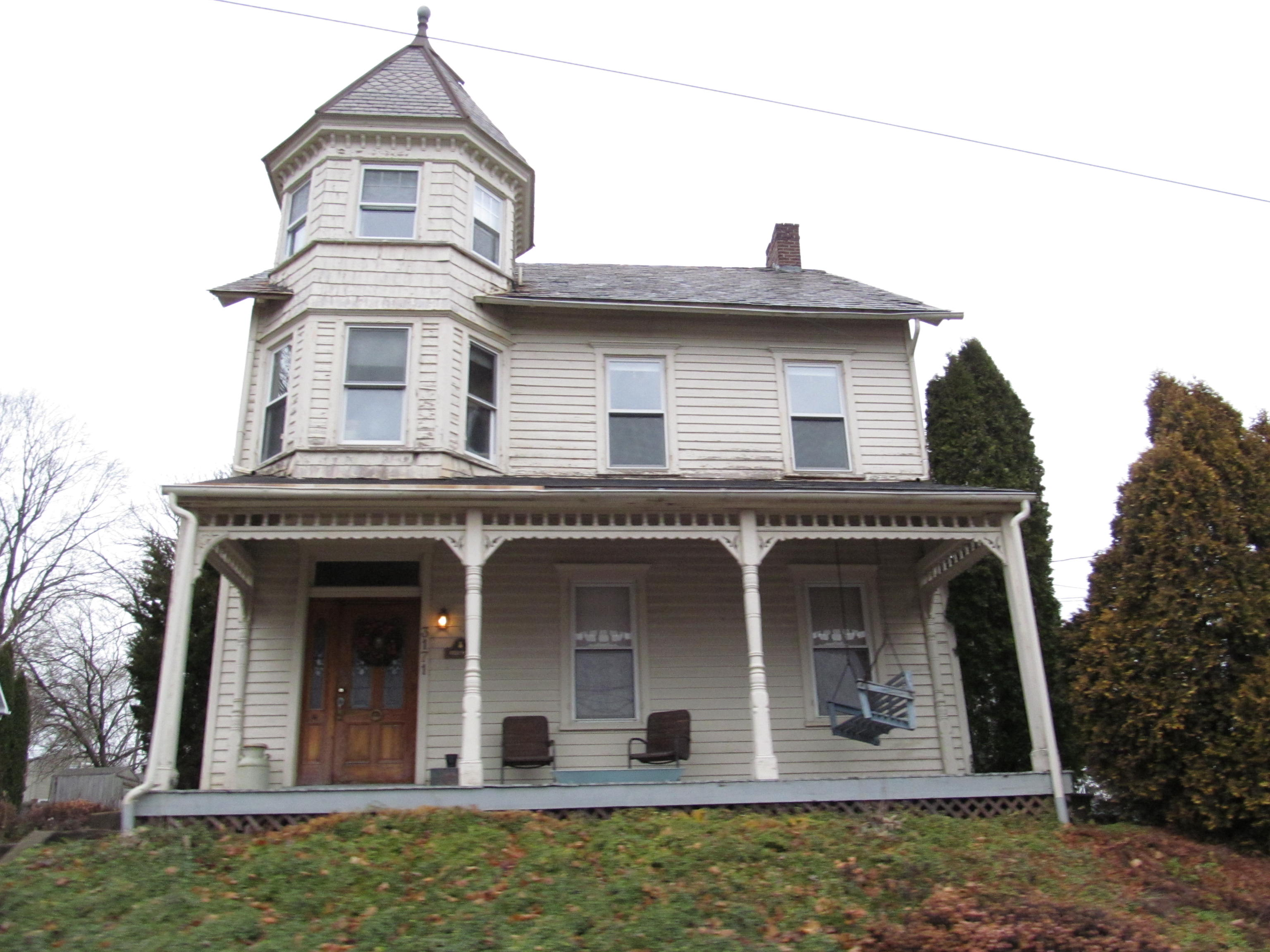
- House in Butztown in December 2012

- Location within Pennsylvania Location within the United States
- Coordinates: 40°39′11″N 75°19′41″W
- Country: United States
- State: Pennsylvania
- County: Northampton
- Township: Bethlehem
- Elevation: 358 ft (109 m)

Population
  - Metro: 865,310 (US: 68th)
- Time zone: UTC-5 (Eastern (EST))
  - Summer (DST): UTC-4 (EDT)
- ZIP Code: 18020
- Area codes: 610 and 484
- GNIS feature ID: 1213157

Butztown is an unincorporated community in Bethlehem Township, Pennsylvania. It is located northeast of Bethlehem. The village is part of the Lehigh Valley metropolitan area, which had a population of 861,899 and was the 68th-most populous metropolitan area in the U.S. as of the 2020 census.

Easton Avenue connects the village with the city and with PA Route 33 to the east. Butztown uses the Bethlehem ZIP Code of 18020.

== History ==
In 1795, George Butz erected a large stone house in what is now the village named for him. Eleven years later, he built a grist mill nearby along Nancy Run creek, a tributary of the Lehigh River. Butz was a farmer by trade, but in addition to the grist mill, he operated a store and tavern, until going bankrupt circa 1825. A number of other families located here, and from 1830 to 1905, the village was known as Butzville, at which point the current name came into use. The western portion of the village was absorbed by Bethlehem in the early 1900s during the city's expansion period.

Sometime after Butz's bankruptcy, his saw mill was purchased by R.T. Schweitzer, who converted it into the Butztown Hotel, the village's main landmark. The hotel, on Easton Avenue, became the Keystone Pub in 2000.
