= Braelin Moore =

American football player

No. 61 – LSU Tigers
- Position: Center
- Class: Redshirt Senior

Personal information
- Listed height: 6 ft 2 in (1.88 m)
- Listed weight: 301 lb (137 kg)

Career information
- High school: Freedom (Bethlehem, Pennsylvania)
- College: Virginia Tech (2022–2024); LSU (2025–present)
- Stats at ESPN

Braelin Moore is an American football center for the LSU Tigers. He previously played for the Virginia Tech Hokies.

== Early life ==
Moore attended Freedom High School in Bethlehem, Pennsylvania. He committed to play college football for the Virginia Tech Hokies.

== College career ==
As a freshman in 2022, Moore appeared in four games and took a redshirt. During the 2023 season, he started in 12 games at left guard. In 2024, Moore moved over to center, starting in 12 games. After the conclusion of the season, he entered the NCAA transfer portal.

Moore transferred to play for the LSU Tigers. During the 2025 season, he started in 12 games for the Tigers. After the conclusion of the season, Moore announced his return to LSU for his senior season in 2026.

== Personal life ==
Moore is the younger brother of former Virginia Tech and NFL offensive lineman Kaden Moore.
