= Growth industry =

Growth industry may refer to:

- Increasing demand, growth of economic demand
- Economics of growth hormone treatment

== See also ==
- MLB Industry Growth Fund
- Industry (disambiguation)
