= Pembroke Village =

- Pembroke Village Historic District
- U.S. National Register of Historic Places
- U.S. Historic district
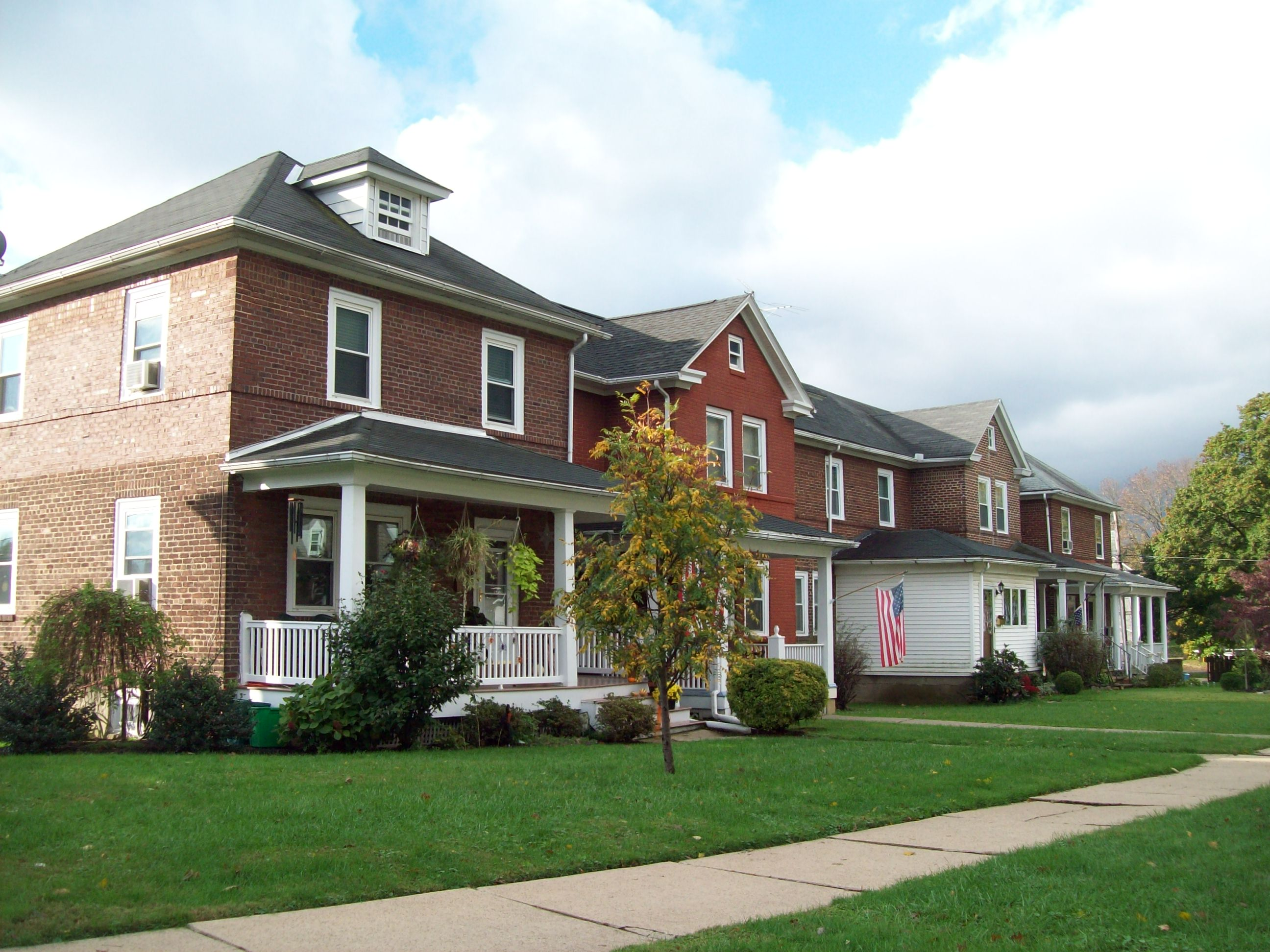
- Pembroke Village Historic District in October 2011

- Location within Pennsylvania Location within the United States
- Location: Roughly bounded by Radclyffe St., Carlisle St., Stefko Blvd., Arcadia St. and Minsi Trail, Bethlehem, Pennsylvania
- Coordinates: 40°37′52″N 75°21′35″W
- Area: 21 acres (8.5 ha)
- Built: 1918
- Built by: United States Housing Corporation
- Architect: Medary, Milton Bennett
- Architectural style: Colonial Revival
- NRHP reference No.: 88000464
- Added to NRHP: May 9, 1988

Pembroke is a public housing community in northeast Bethlehem, Pennsylvania. The area was listed as a national historic district on the National Register of Historic Places in 1988.

== History ==
Originally began in 1918 in order to house steel workers for the increased demand of steel in World War I. The number of houses needed was overestimated and the United States Housing Corporation gave up on the project. By 1941, the Pembroke project was finished and contained 202 units of low-income public housing and it was the first such project in the city. By the early 1950s, the Bethlehem Housing Authority purchased additional adjoining lands, including an 86-acre (350,000 m^{2}) farm to build additional affordable housing in the area. Between 1952 and 1962, the Authority built 570 units, which included Marvine Village (400 units), Fairmount Homes (120) and Pfeifle Homes (50). These three developments added to Pembroke created one large community collectively known as the Northeast Developments.

Over the years, the buildings have undergone many millions of dollars in renovations. Pembroke was renovated in the 1990s, Fairmount and Marvine twice each since the 1980s. Comprehensive renovations were recently completed at Pfeifle Homes.

Presently, 20 new homes are being built in the area near Fairmount, to be called Bayard Homes. They add to BHA's inventory and guarantee that 5% of all BHA units are handicap-accessible.

== Emergency services ==
=== Police service ===
Thanks to a long-term agreement between the housing authority and the City of Bethlehem, community policing substations are a part of BHA properties, including the Marvine-Pembroke area. The community police concept is funded by BHA on an annual basis and in return, the BPD provides above baseline services for the community.

== Demographics ==
The population breakdown in Pembroke is roughly 70% Hispanic, with remaining people being either Caucasian or African American. As is the case with all low-income public housing, the community is made up of families, some seniors and some who are disabled.

== Gang activity ==
Like many Pennsylvania communities, the Lehigh Valley has seen an influx of gangs from larger urban areas. It is thought that the completion of Interstate 78 in 1990 has contributed to this phenomenon. Despite this, official gang activities are limited in Bethlehem as evidenced by FBI crime statistics.

== Schools ==
Pembroke is part of the Bethlehem Area School District.

=== Elementary ===
- Marvine Elementary School - Demographics: 8% White, 17% African American, 75% Hispanic, with 86% of students eligible for free or reduced-price lunch program.
- Lincoln Elementary School - Demographics: 34% White, 6% African American, 58% Hispanic, with 64% of students eligible for free or reduced-price lunch program.
- Freemansburg Elementary School - Demographics: 37% White, 8% African American, 54% Hispanic, with 69% of students eligible for free or reduced-price lunch program.

=== Middle ===
- Northeast Middle School - Demographics: 48% White, 13% African American, 38% Hispanic, with 53% of students eligible for free or reduced-price lunch program.

== See also ==
- Public housing in the United States
