= J. J. Maura =

American actor

Joseph J. Maura, Jr. (June 16, 1949 – July 28, 2010), often professionally credited as J. J. Maura, was an American television announcer and voiceover artist. Maura worked as the announcer for WCAU-TV, the NBC affiliate in Philadelphia, Pennsylvania, for twenty years.

== Early life and education ==
Maura was born in on June 16, 1949, in Fountain Hill, Pennsylvania, to Joseph J. Maura, Sr. and Isabel C. (née Fuoco) Maura. He was raised in Hellertown, Pennsylvania. Maura graduated from Liberty High School in Bethlehem, Pennsylvania in 1967.

== Career ==
Maura's career in television and radio began at several stations throughout the region, including WAEB in Allentown, Pennsylvania, KQV in Pittsburgh, WIP in Philadelphia and QVC, based in West Chester, Pennsylvania. During his career, Maura's on-air names included Jim Lloyd, Jim Hamilton and J.J. Media. Maura joined WCAU in Philadelphia, where he worked as the station's main announcer for twenty years, until his retirement due to illness.

== Death ==
Maura died from cancer on July 28, 2010, in Lower Saucon Township, Pennsylvania at age 61. He was survived by his wife, Lois (Deutsch) Maura; four children - Lisa, Ann, Russell and David; and 12 grandchildren.
