= Growth rate =

Growth rate may refer to:

== By rate ==
- Asymptotic analysis, a branch of mathematics concerned with the analysis of growth rates
- Linear growth
- Exponential growth, a growth rate classification
- Any of a variety of growth rates classified by such things as the Landau notation

== By type of growing medium ==
- Economic growth, the increase in value of the goods and services produced by an economy
- Compound annual growth rate or CAGR, a measure of financial growth
- Population growth rate, change in population over time
- Growth rate (group theory), a property of a group in group theory

== In biology ==
- The rate of growth in any biological system, see Growth § Biology.
