= Middletown, Northampton County, Pennsylvania =

Unincorporated community in Pennsylvania, US

Middletown
- Census-designated place
- Location of Middletown in Pennsylvania Middletown (the United States)
- Coordinates: 40°38′45″N 75°19′40″W
- Country: United States
- State: Pennsylvania
- County: Northampton

Area
  - Census-designated place: 2.6 sq mi (6.7 km^{2})
  - Land: 2.6 sq mi (6.7 km^{2})
  - Water: 0.0 sq mi (0 km^{2})
- Elevation: 276 ft (84 m)

Population (2010)
  - Census-designated place: 7,441
  - Density: 2,900/sq mi (1,100/km^{2})
  - Metro: 865,310 (US: 68th)
- Time zone: UTC-5 (EST)
  - Summer (DST): UTC-4 (EDT)
- Area code: 610

Middletown is a census-designated place (CDP) in Bethlehem Township in Northampton County, Pennsylvania, United States. The population of Middletown was 7,441 at the 2010 census. Middletown is part of the Lehigh Valley, which had a population of 861,899 and was the 68th-most populous metropolitan area in the U.S. as of the 2020 census.

== Geography ==
Middletown is located at 40°38′45″N 75°19′40″W (40.645898, -75.327822). According to the U.S. Census Bureau, Middletown has a total area of 2.6 square miles (6.7 km^{2}), all land.

== Demographics ==
As of the 2000 census, there were 7,378 people, 2,779 households, and 2,125 families residing in the CDP. The population density was 2,858.1 inhabitants per square mile (1,103.5/km^{2}). There were 2,862 housing units at an average density of 1,108.7 per square mile (428.1/km^{2}). The racial makeup of the CDP was 94.88% White, 2.07% African American, 0.05% Native American, 0.94% Asian, 1.11% from other races, and 0.95% from two or more races. Hispanic or Latino of any race were 4.31% of the population.

There were 2,779 households, out of which 32.4% had children under the age of 18 living with them, 66.5% were married couples living together, 7.6% had a female householder with no husband present, and 23.5% were non-families. 19.5% of all households were made up of individuals, and 9.1% had someone living alone who was 65 years of age or older. The average household size was 2.65 and the average family size was 3.05.

In Middletown, the population was spread out, with 23.9% under the age of 18, 5.7% from 18 to 24, 29.5% from 25 to 44, 27.1% from 45 to 64, and 13.8% who were 65 years of age or older. The median age was 40 years. For every 100 females, there were 96.1 males. For every 100 females age 18 and over, there were 95.7 males.

The median income for a household in the CDP was $53,785, and the median income for a family was $61,690. Males had a median income of $41,543 versus $29,048 for females. The per capita income for the CDP was $22,282. About 2.3% of families and 3.4% of the population were below the poverty line, including 3.6% of those under age 18 and 3.0% of those age 65 or over.

== Education ==
The community is served by the Bethlehem Area School District.
