= Bethlehem Area School District Stadium =

Sports venue in Bethlehem, Pennsylvania

- BASD Stadium
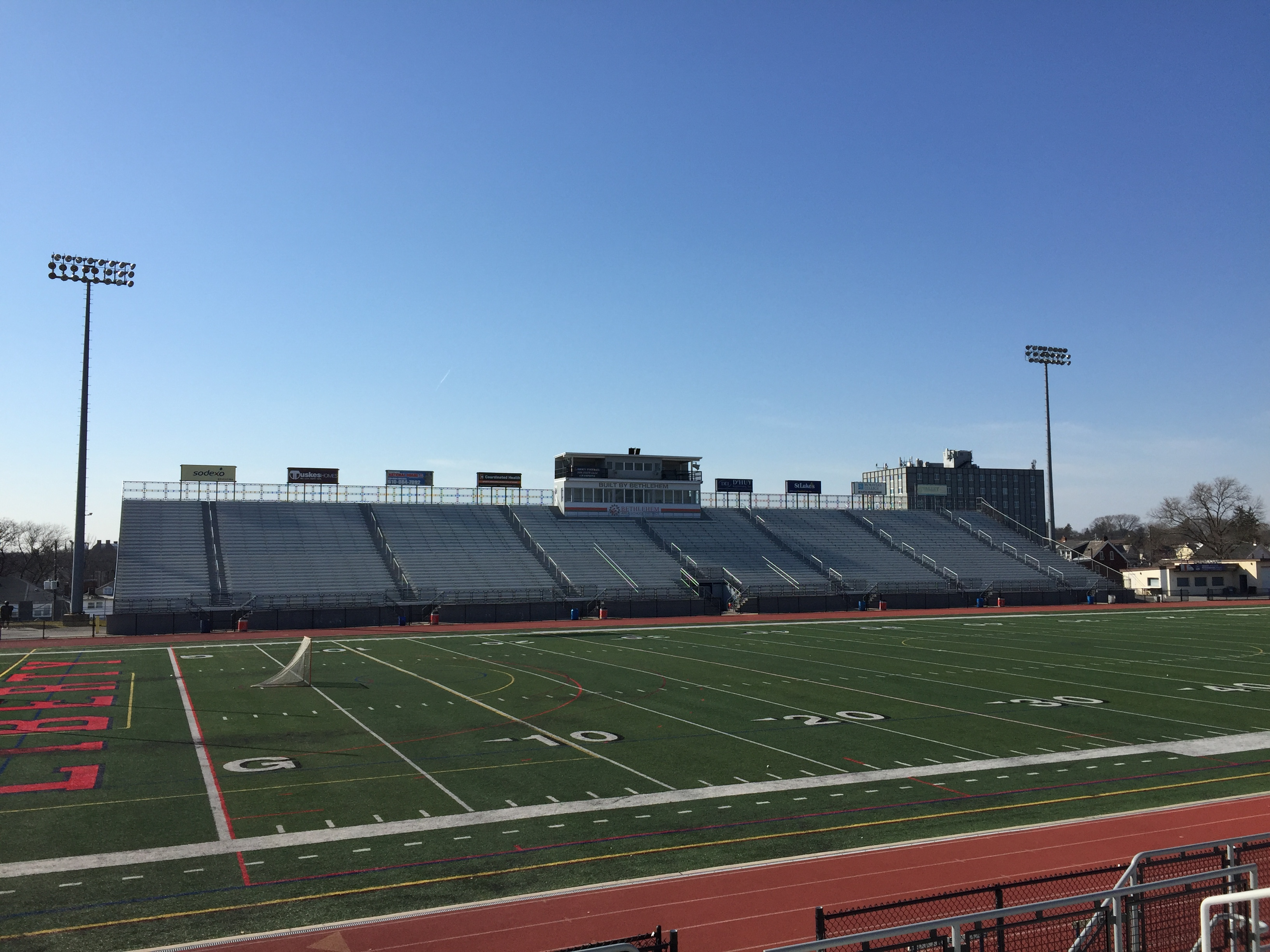
- Bethlehem Area School District Stadium in March 2021
- Interactive map of Bethlehem Area School District Stadium
- Full name: Bethlehem Area School District Stadium
- Location: 1115 Linden Street, Bethlehem, Pennsylvania, 18018
- Coordinates: 40.6297°N 75.3734°W
- Owner: Bethlehem Area School District
- Operator: Bethlehem Area School District
- Capacity: 16,000 (14,000 seated)
- Surface: FieldTurf
- Scoreboard: Daktronics

Construction
- Groundbreaking: 1938
- Built: 1938–1939
- Opened: 1939
- Renovated: 2005, 2016–2018
- General contractor: Bethlehem Steel
- Main contractor: Works Progress Administration

Tenants
- Liberty High School (PIAA); Freedom High School (PIAA)

Bethlehem Area School District Stadium, or BASD Stadium, is a multi-purpose stadium in Bethlehem, Pennsylvania. It is one of Pennsylvania's largest high school stadiums, seating up to 14,000 and occupying up to 16,000 including the stadium's standing room section and is the home stadium for three large Bethlehem-based Eastern Pennsylvania Conference public high schools, Liberty High School, Freedom High School, and Bethlehem Catholic High School.

The stadium, which was built in 1939 by Bethlehem Steel, has been described as "a local football mecca."

== History ==
The BASD school board made multiple attempts between 1924 and 1930 to construct a stadium at Liberty High School; however, they were unsuccessful in doing so due to high estimated costs. In January 1938, the school board formed a committee to oversee to construction of the stadium after receiving partial funding from the Works Progress Administration. The steel for the stadium grandstands was donated by Bethlehem Steel, with the first beam being put in place in January 1939. The project was completed by May of the same year. The first game played in the new stadium was on September 23, but the stadium was not commemorated until November 4.

In the 1970s, additional improvements were made to the stadium, including the installation of a track and lavatory facilities, as well as upgrades to the field-house. In 1993, new concession stands, ticket booths, and a scoreboard were added. The stadium was further renovated in 2005 when a new light system was installed and FieldTurf was added thanks in part to the generosity of Frank Banko. The field was renamed “Frank Banko Field at BASD Stadium” from 2005-2018.

In 2016, the field turf and track were replaced. The scoreboard was replaced and the away-side grandstand was renovated before the start of the 2018 football season. The home-side grandstand was renovated in the summer of 2019.
