= Freedom High School (Bethlehem, Pennsylvania) =

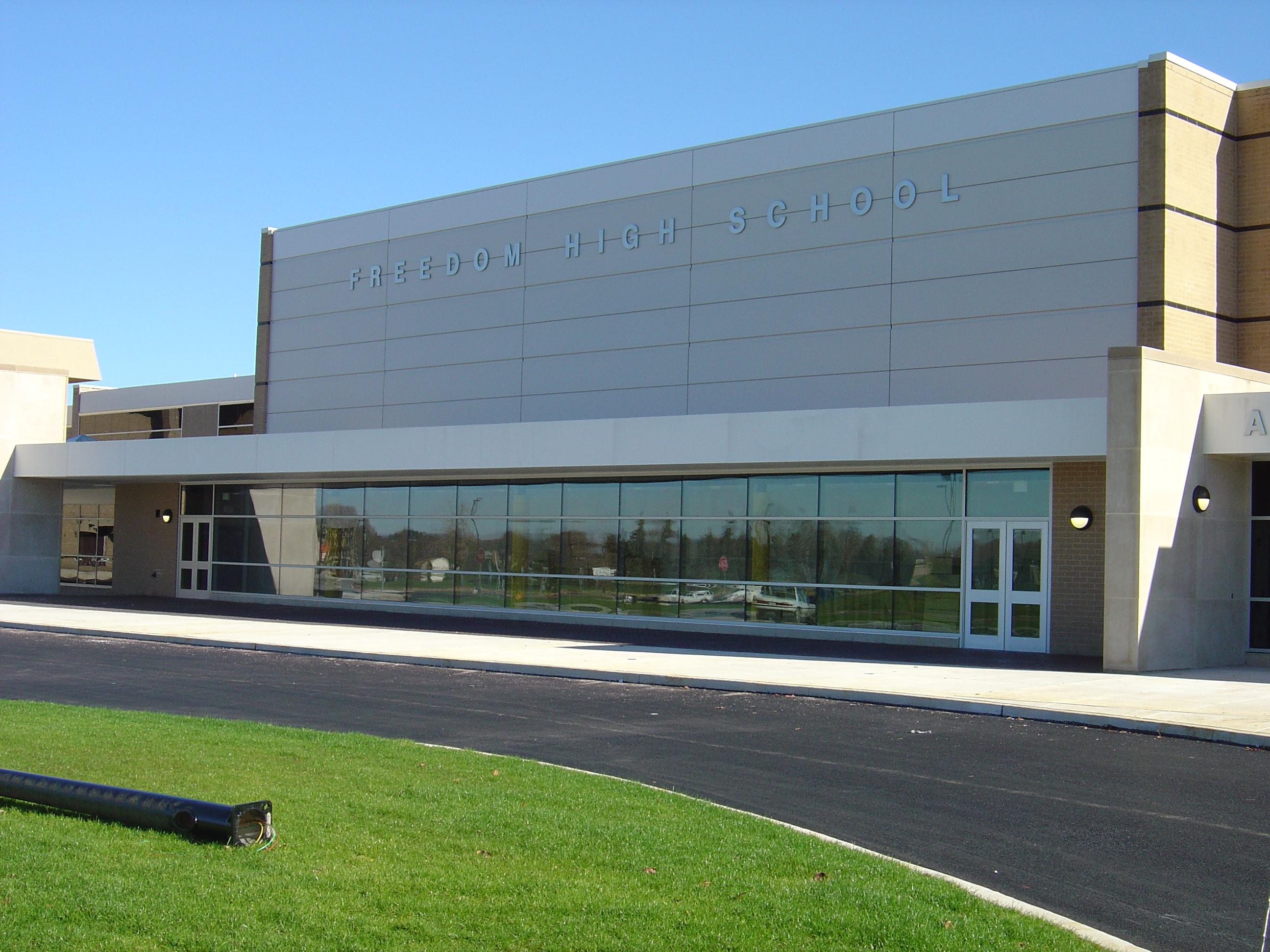
- Freedom High School in Bethlehem Township, Pennsylvania in November 2006

Location
- 3149 Chester Avenue; Bethlehem, Pennsylvania 18020; United States; 40.664°N 75.340°W

Information
- Type: Public high school
- Established: September 7, 1967; 59 years ago
- School district: Bethlehem Area School District
- Superintendent: Jack Silva
- NCES School ID: 420357004957
- Principal: Laurie Sage
- Staff: 108.45 (on an FTE basis)
- Grades: 9th–12th
- Enrollment: 1,792 (2024–25)
- Student to teacher ratio: 16.52
- Campus type: Suburb: Large
- Colors: Black and gold
- Athletics conference: Eastern Pennsylvania Conference
- Mascot: Patriot
- Rival: Liberty High School
- Website: basdwpweb.beth.k12.pa.us/freedom/

Freedom High School is a large urban, public high school located in Bethlehem Township in the Lehigh Valley region of eastern Pennsylvania. Freedom High School is one of the two public high schools operated by the Bethlehem Area School District. It is located at 3149 Chester Avenue in Bethlehem Township.

As of the 2024–25 school year, Freedom High School has an enrollment of 1,792 students, according to National Center for Education Statistics data. The school employs 108.45 teachers (on an FTE basis) basis for a student-teacher ratio of 16.52.

== Athletics ==
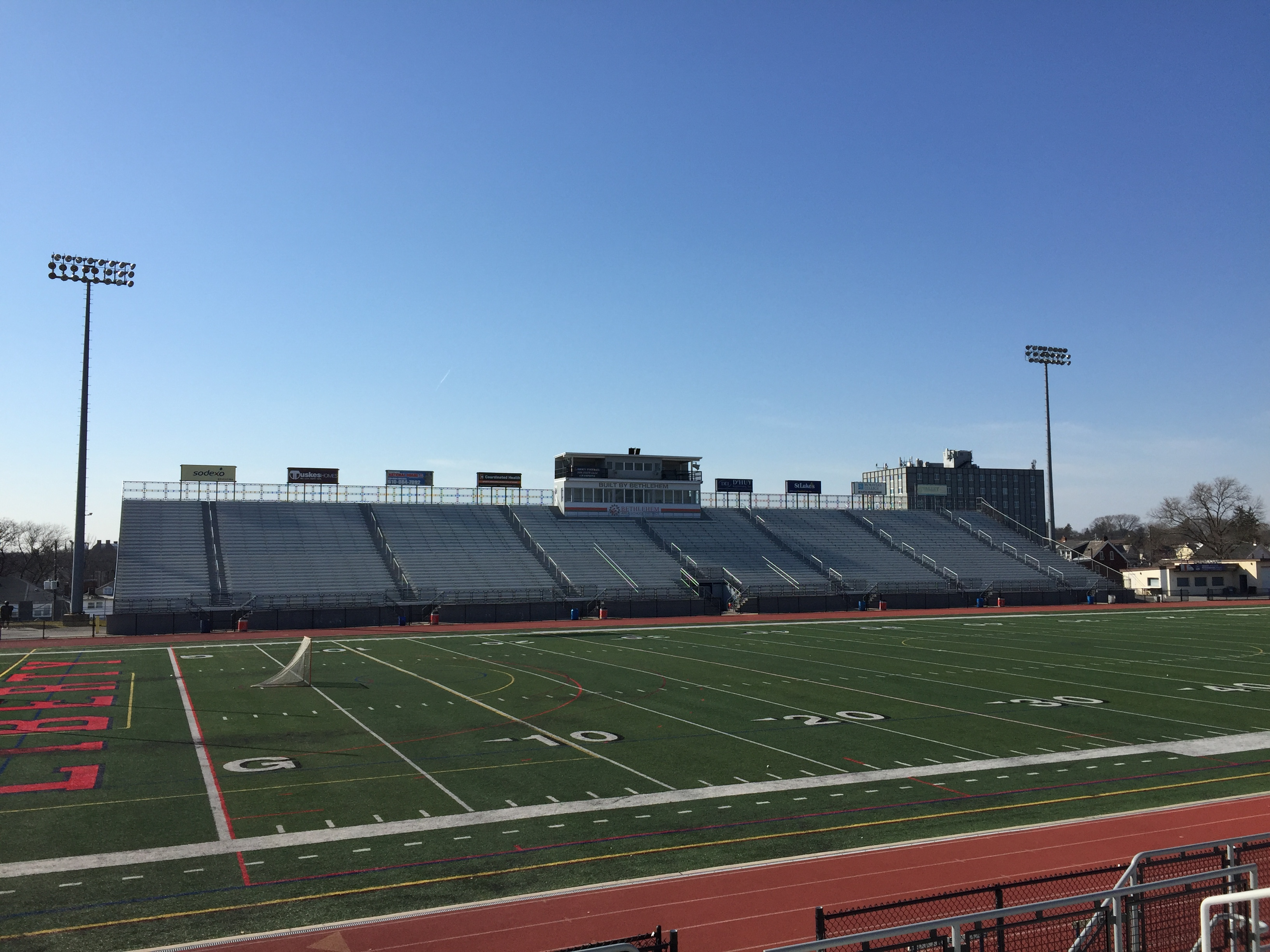
Freedom High School football team's home field, BASD Stadium, a 14,000 capacity stadium in Bethlehem that is one of the largest high school stadiums in the state

Freedom High School competes athletically in the Eastern Pennsylvania Conference (EPC) in the District XI division of the Pennsylvania Interscholastic Athletic Association. The school holds the record for the most Lehigh Valley Conference championships in boys volleyball.

In boys athletics, Freedom participates in football, basketball, golf, ice hockey, soccer, baseball, tennis, volleyball, lacrosse, swimming, wrestling, diving, rifle, track and field and cross country. In girls athletics, Freedom sponsors basketball, soccer, lacrosse, golf, cheerleading, tennis, volleyball, rifle, track and field, cross country, field hockey, swimming, and diving teams.

The Freedom High School football, soccer, and field hockey teams play their home games at Frank Banko Field at Bethlehem Area School District Stadium, one of the largest high school stadiums in the state, with a capacity of 14,000.

Freedom High School's mascot is the Patriot, the name given those American colonists who resisted the colonial governance of the Kingdom of Great Britain during the American Revolution, especially prior to the formation of the Continental Army in 1775.

== Notable alumni ==
- Afa Anoaʻi Jr., former WWE professional wrestler
- Dwayne Johnson, actor and professional wrestler under the ring name "The Rock"
- Daniel Dae Kim, actor, Lost and Hawaii Five-0, and producer, The Good Doctor
- Braelin Moore, college football center for the LSU Tigers
- Michael Pocalyko, business executive and novelist
