= Growth regulator =

Growth regulator may refer to:

- Growth hormone, stimulates growth in humans and other animals
- Insect growth regulator, used as insecticides
- Plant hormone, used to control the growth of weeds
