= Growth model =

Growth model can refer to:

- Population dynamics in demography
- Economic growth

- Solow–Swan model in macroeconomics
- Fei-Ranis model of economic growth
- Endogenous growth theory
- Kaldor's growth model
- Harrod-Domar model
- W.A Lewis growth model
- Rostow's stages of growth
