= Growth impairment =

Growth impairment may refer to:

- Intrauterine growth restriction
- Impaired economic growth
