= Curve of growth =

Curve used to interpret spectral features in astronomy

Example of a curve of growth

In astronomy, the curve of growth describes the equivalent width of a spectral line as a function of the column density of the material from which the spectral line is observed.

== Shape ==
The curve of growth describes the dependence of the equivalent width $W$, which is an effective measure of the strength of a feature in a emission or absorption spectrum, on the column density $N$. Because the spectrum of a single spectral line has a characteristic shape, being broadened by various processes from a pure line, by increasing the optical depth $\tau$ of a medium that either absorbs or emits light, the strength of the feature develops non-trivially.

In the case of the combined natural line width, collisional broadening and thermal Doppler broadening, the spectrum can be described by a Voigt profile and the curve of growth exhibits the approximate dependencies depicted on the right. For low optical depth $\tau \ll 1$ corresponding to low $N$, increasing the thickness of the medium leads to a linear increase of absorption and the equivalent line width grows linearly $W \propto N$. Once the central Gaussian part of the profile saturates, $\tau\approx 1$ and the Gaussian tails will lead to a less effective growth of $W \propto \sqrt{\ln N}$. Eventually, the growth will be dominated by the Lorentzian tails of the profile, which decays as $\sim 1/x^2$, producing a dependence of $W\propto \sqrt{N}$.
