= Bethlehem Township, Pennsylvania =

Township in Pennsylvania, US

- Township
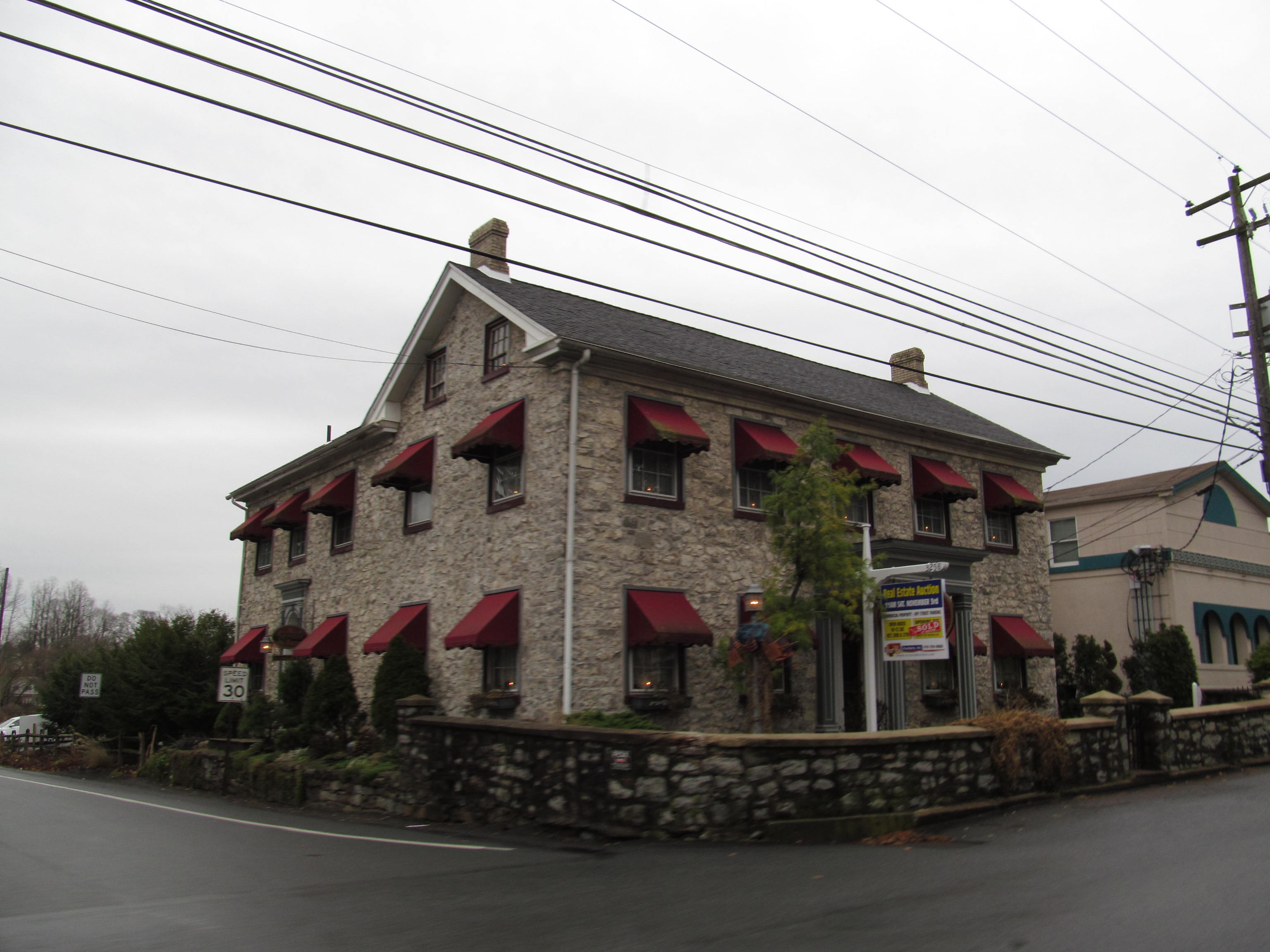
- Butztown, a Bethlehem Township village, in December 2012

- Seal

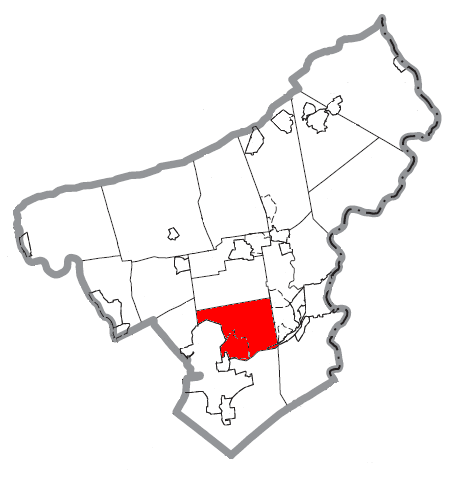
- Location (in red) within Northampton County
- Coordinates: 40°40′00″N 75°17′59″W
- Country: United States
- State: Pennsylvania
- County: Northampton

Area
  - Township: 14.60 sq mi (37.82 km^{2})
  - Land: 14.43 sq mi (37.38 km^{2})
  - Water: 0.17 sq mi (0.45 km^{2})
- Elevation: 440 ft (130 m)

Population (2020)
  - Township: 25,861
  - Estimate (2023): 26,338
  - Density: 1,659.7/sq mi (640.81/km^{2})
  - Metro: 865,310 (US: 68th)
- Time zone: UTC-5 (EST)
  - Summer (DST): UTC-4 (EDT)
- ZIP Codes: 18020, 18045
- Area codes: 610 and 484
- FIPS code: 42-095-06096
- Primary airport: Lehigh Valley International Airport
- Major hospital: Lehigh Valley Hospital–Cedar Crest
- School district: Bethlehem Area
- Website: http://bethlehemtownship.org/

Bethlehem Township is a township in Northampton County, Pennsylvania, United States. The population of Bethlehem Township was 25,861 at the 2020 census. It is a suburb of Bethlehem and is part of the Lehigh Valley metropolitan statistical area, which had a population of 861,899 and was the 68th-most populous metropolitan area in the U.S. as of the 2020 census.

Bethlehem Township is located 13.6 miles (21.9 km) northeast of Allentown, 73.2 miles (117.8 km) north of Philadelphia, and 79.5 miles (127.9 km) west of New York City.

== Geography ==
According to the U.S. Census Bureau, the township has a total area of 14.7 square miles (38 km^{2}), of which 14.6 square miles (38 km^{2}) is land and 0.1 square miles (0.26 km^{2}) (0.61%) is water. It is drained by the Lehigh River, which separates it from Lower Saucon Township. Its villages include Brodhead, Butztown, Farmersville, Middletown, Prospect Park (also in Palmer Township), and Wagnerville.

=== Neighboring municipalities ===
- Lower Saucon Township (south)
- Easton (southeast)
- Palmer Township (east)
- Lower Nazareth Township (north)
- Hanover Township (west)
- Bethlehem (southwest)
- Freemansburg (southwest)

=== Climate ===
Bethlehem Township has a hot-summer humid continental climate (Dfa) and the hardiness zone is 6b. Average monthly temperatures in Farmersville range from 28.8 °F in January to 73.8 °F in July.

== History ==
Prior to the arrival of European settlers, Lenape Native American tribe lived in present-day Bethlehem Township and elsewhere in Lehigh Valley. The Lehigh River and its Monocacy Creek and Nancy Run tributaries, provided fertile soil and ample fishing opportunities for the Lenape's inhabitants before the arrival of William Penn, newly named "Proprietor" of the Province of Pennsylvania in 1681. In 1737, Penn's family negotiated a land purchase from the Lenape, known as the Walking Purchase. From this agreement, settlement began by Europeans newly arrived in pre-Revolutionary War Pennsylvania.

The municipality of Bethlehem Township was formed in 1746 as a part of Bucks County. The name of Bethlehem itself originated from the German Moravian Brethren on Christmas Eve in 1741. The township was initially designed to contain present-day Bethlehem Township and present day Upper Nazareth and Lower Nazareth townships. The 1874 edition of Atlas of Northampton County shows Upper and Lower Nazareth Townships had been created, but Bethlehem had not yet annexed the areas of Altona and parcels along Center Street (Bath Pike), Linden Street (Nazareth Pike), and Easton Avenue.

== Demographics ==
Historical population
Census	Pop.	Note	%±
2000	21,171		—
2010	23,730		12.1%
2020	25,861		9.0%
2023 (est.)	26,338		1.8%
U.S. Decennial Census

As of the 2000 census, there were 21,171 people, 7,619 households, and 5,889 families residing in the township. The population density was 1,451.7 inhabitants per square mile (560.5/km^{2}). There were 7,831 housing units at an average density of 537.0 units per square mile (207.3 units/km^{2}). The racial makeup of the township was 93.27% White, 2.44% African American, 0.07% Native American, 2.20% Asian, 0.01% Pacific Islander, 1.14% from other races, and 0.87% from two or more races. Hispanic or Latino of any race were 3.97% of the population.

There were 7,619 households, out of which 36.2% had children under the age of 18 living with them, 67.4% were married couples living together, 7.4% had a female householder with no husband present, and 22.7% were non-families. 19.2% of all households were made up of individuals, and 8.9% had someone living alone who was 65 years of age or older. The average household size was 2.69 and the average family size was 3.09.

In the township, the population was spread out, with 25.1% under the age of 18, 6.4% from 18 to 24, 28.1% from 25 to 44, 25.5% from 45 to 64, and 14.8% who were 65 years of age or older. The median age was 40 years. For every 100 females there were 93.1 males. For every 100 females age 18 and over, there were 89.5 males. The median income for a household in the township was $60,317, and the median income for a family was $68,427. Males had a median income of $47,363 versus $32,136 for females. The per capita income for the township was $25,141. About 2.2% of families and 2.7% of the population were below the poverty line, including 2.6% of those under age 18 and 4.2% of those age 65 or over.

== Transportation ==
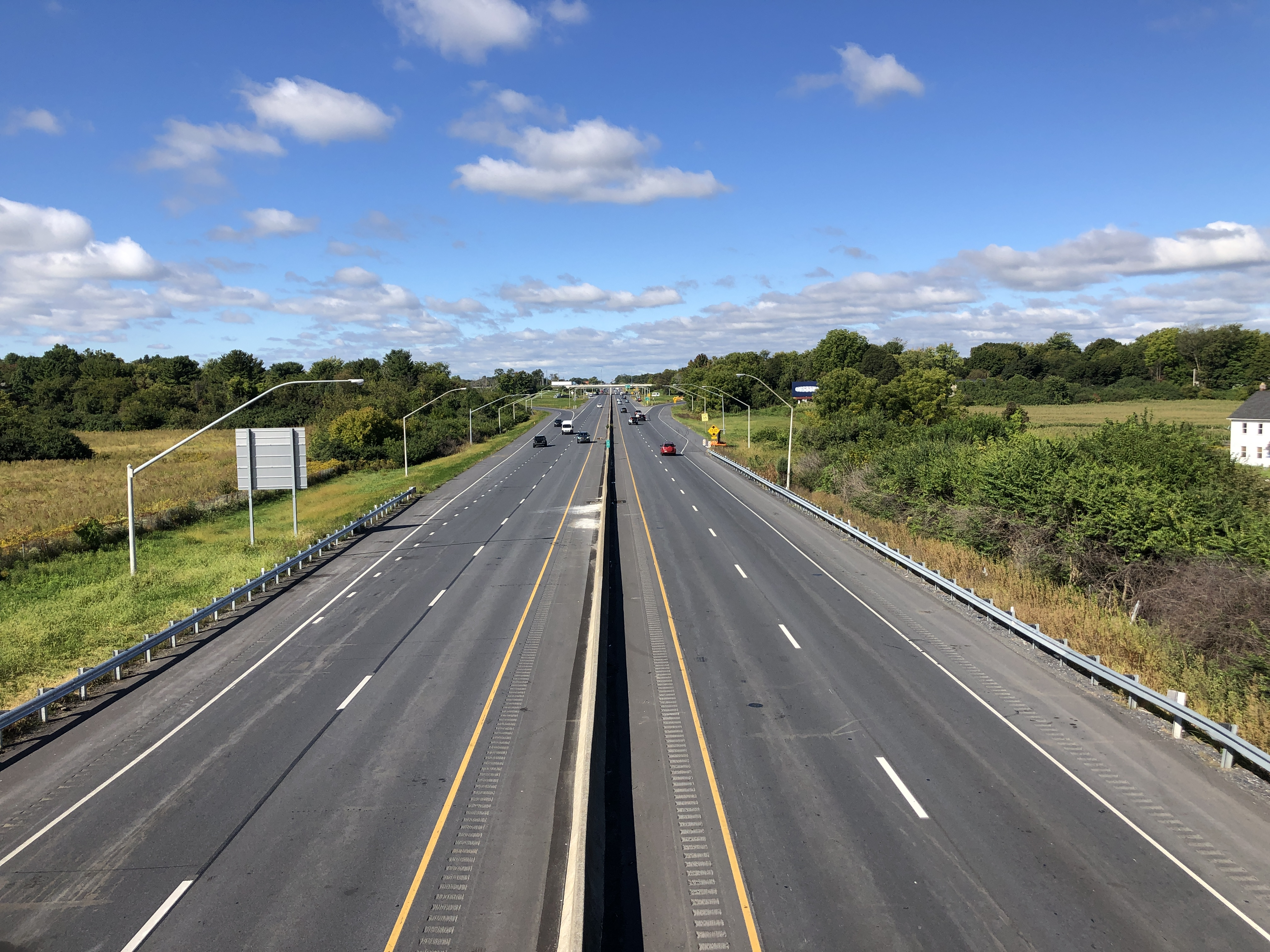
US Route 22 West in Bethlehem Township in September 2022

As of 2021, there were 140.29 miles (225.77 km) of public roads in Bethlehem Township, of which 27.20 miles (43.77 km) were maintained by the Pennsylvania Department of Transportation (PennDOT) and 113.09 miles (182.00 km) were maintained by the township.

U.S. Route 22 and Pennsylvania Route 33 are the main highways serving Bethlehem Township. US 22 follows the Lehigh Valley Thruway along an east–west alignment across the northern part of the township, while PA 33 follows a north–south alignment across the eastern part of the township. The southern terminus of Pennsylvania Route 191 is at US 22 in the northwestern portion of the township, from which it heads north along Nazareth Pike. Other major roads include William Penn Highway and Freemansburg Road, both following east-to-west alignments, with Butztown Road/Hecktown Road, Farmersville Road, and the Main Street Extension all following north-to-south alignments.

== Education ==
=== Public education ===
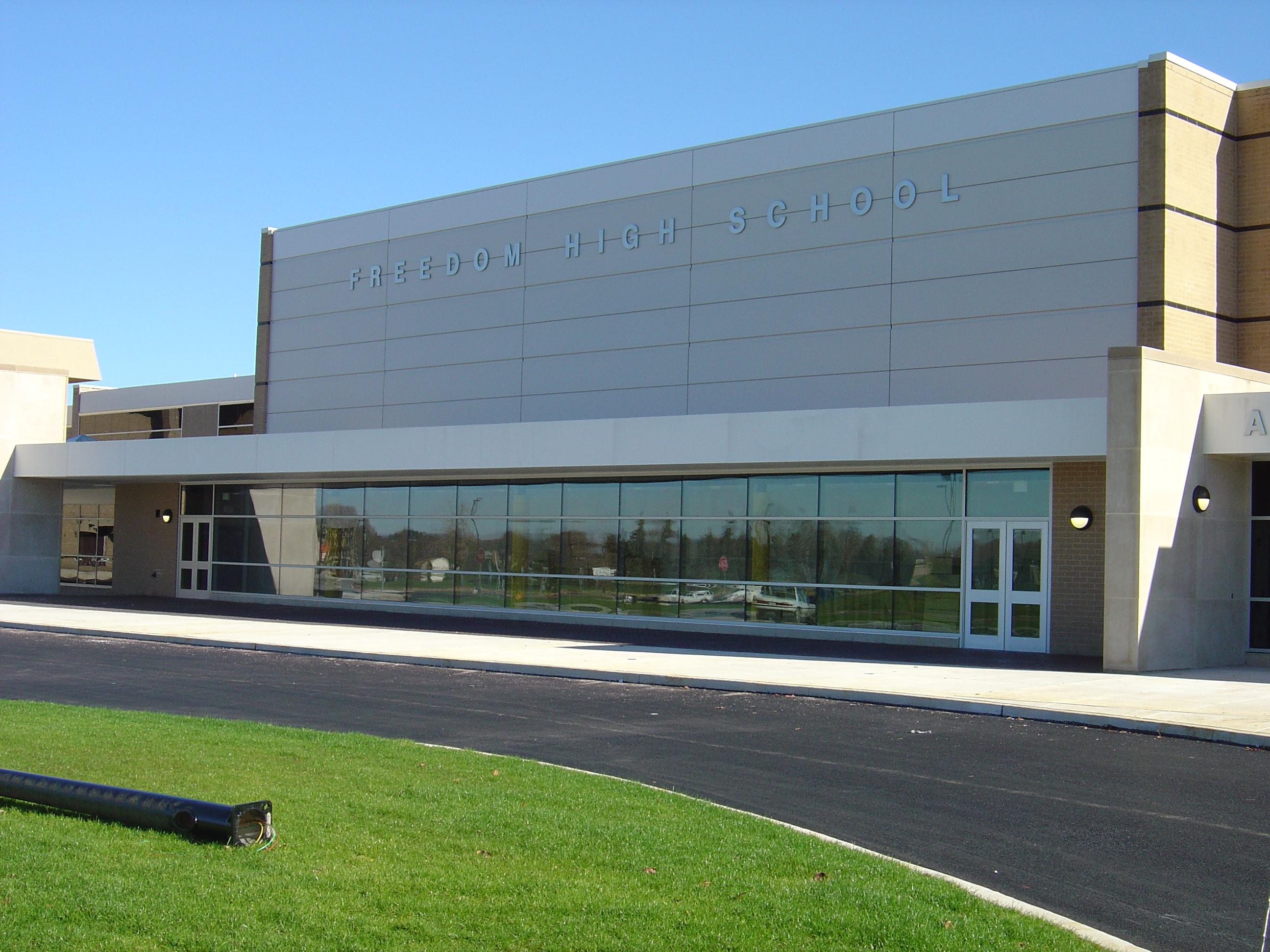
Freedom High School in Bethlehem Township, November 2006

Bethlehem Township is part of the Bethlehem Area School District, which maintains two large public high schools, Freedom High School and Liberty High School. Students in grades nine through 12 attend Freedom High School in the township.

The school district also maintains four middle schools and sixteen elementary schools. Four parochial schools also exist in the area: Notre Dame High School in Easton and Bethlehem Christian School, Moravian Academy, and Our Lady of Perpetual Help, all located in Bethlehem.

=== Community college ===
- Northampton Community College, Bethlehem Township

== Police ==
As of 2015, there were 35 full-time officers on the local police force. Police personnel earned 15 of the township's top 20 salaries in 2006 with the highest-paid officer grossing nearly $78,000, according to figures released by the township in 2007.

== Emergency services ==
Bethlehem Township is served by two volunteer fire departments, Bethlehem Township and Nancy Run Fire Companies. Bethlehem Township Volunteer Fire Company Station 17, houses two Engines, one Heavy Rescue, two Utility Vehicles, two ATVs, two Brush Units, Rescue Boat and two command vehicles. This station also provides Emergency Medical Services and offers BLS and ALS capabilities to the township, its fleet consists of six ALS ambulances, rehab trailer and supervisors QRS vehicle. Nancy Run Fire Company Station 14, houses three Engines, one Truck (100 ft.) Tower Ladder, one Utility Truck, one Light and Air Truck, and two Command Vehicles. Both departments average more than 900 fire calls annually making them the busiest volunteer fire companies in Northampton county.

== Parks and recreation ==
Bethlehem Township's parks system provides recreation opportunities for its residents through a series of parks, trail systems, and greenways. The township's two largest parks, Municipal Park on Farmersville Road in the center of the township and the Janet Johnston Housenick and William D. Housenick Memorial Park on Christian Spring Road in the northwestern corner of the township, provide dozens of acres of green space. Municipal Park features a modern recreation facility with tennis and basketball courts, a fitness trail, hardball and softball fields, and other modern amenities. The Housenick Park property consists of conserved lands which formed part of the Camel's Hump Farm property of Archibald Johnston, the first mayor of the consolidated city of Bethlehem.

Complementing the active and passive park facilities in the township is the Palmer/Bethlehem Rail Trail, a 7.3 square miles (19 km^{2}) bicycle and walking trail near the north bank of the Lehigh River linking the county seat of Easton to the east with the city of Bethlehem, the largest municipality in the county.
