= Equivalent width =

Measure of the strength of a spectral line

A diagram indicating the equivalent width corresponding to the absorption line, which is shown in red.

The equivalent width of a spectral absorption line is the width of the rectangle which has the same area as that between the intensity profile of the absorption line as a function of wavelength, and the continuum level, with the height of the rectangle being the magnitude of the continuum emission. It is a measure of the strength of spectral features that is primarily used in astronomy. The intensity profile of the absorption line depends upon column density, $N$. Column density is defined as the number of atoms per unit area along the line of sight. The curve of growth describes the dependence of the equivalent width, which is an effective measure of the strength of a feature in an emission or absorption spectrum, on the column density. The shape of this profile is initially Gaussian but moves towards a Lorentzian profile as the column density increases.

== Definition ==
Formally, the equivalent width is given by the equation
$$W_\lambda = \int {F_c - F_s \over F_c} d\lambda = \int (1 - F_s / F_c) d\lambda.$$

Here, $F_c(\lambda)$ represents the underlying continuum intensity, while $F_s(\lambda)$ represents the intensity of the actual spectrum (the line and continuum). Then $W_\lambda$ represents the width of a hypothetical line which drops to an intensity of zero and has the "same integrated flux deficit from the continuum as the true one." This equation can be applied to either emission or absorption, but when applied to emission, the value of $W_\lambda$ is negative, and so the absolute value is used.

In other words, if the continuum level is constant and the area under/above the emission/absorption line (compared to the continuum) is $A$ (the integral above), then $A = F_c \times W_\lambda$ (further highlighting the continuum-level dependence). Therefore, for a fixed line strength ($A$), the equivalent width will be smaller for a brighter continuum.

== Applications ==
The equivalent width is used as a quantitative measure of the strength of spectral features. The equivalent width is a convenient choice because the shapes of spectral features can vary depending upon the configuration of the system which is producing the lines. For instance, the line may experience Doppler broadening due to motions of the gas emitting the photons. The photons will be shifted away from the line center, thus rendering the height of the emission line a poor measure of its overall strength. The equivalent width, on the other hand, "measures the fraction of energy removed from the spectrum by the line," regardless of the broadening intrinsic to the line or a detector with poor resolution. Thus the equivalent width can in many conditions yield the number of absorbing or emitting atoms, by using the curve of growth.

For example, measurements of the equivalent width of the Balmer alpha transition in T Tauri stars are used in order to classify individual T Tauri stars as being classical or weak-lined. Also, the equivalent width is used in studying star formation in Lyman alpha galaxies, as the equivalent width of the Lyman alpha line is related to the star formation rate in the galaxy. The equivalent width is also used in many other situations where a quantitative comparison between line strengths is needed.
