= Grow (company) =

Private Canadian financial technology company

Grow Technologies Inc.
- Type: Private Company
- Industry: Financial Technology
- Founded: 2014
- Founders: Kevin Sandhu & Daniel Cowx
- Fate: Acquired by ATB Financial
- Headquarters: Vancouver, British Columbia
- Area served: Canada
- Products: software
- Website: poweredbygrow.com

Grow (formerly Grouplend) is a financial technology company that has formed strategic partnerships with various credit unions to extend its product offerings and online lending services. headquartered in Vancouver, British Columbia and founded by Kevin Sandhu and Daniel Cowx in 2014. It started as a technology driven online consumer lender. Grow's platform enabled borrowers to obtain a loan, which were then sold to private accredited investors and institutional investors. The company later evolved its business model to partner with banks and credit unions to provide its proprietary technology to power traditional financial services companies' digital presence. On February 10, 2016 Grow announced its first partnership with a Canadian financial institution: First West Credit Union. The partnership enabled members of First West Credit Union to access the range of Grow product offerings directly through the British Columbian financial institution. The announcement with First West was followed on February 25, 2016, by a second partnership announcement with Conexus Credit Union, the largest credit union in Saskatchewan, in order to bring its online lending services to the province.

In August 2015 they closed their series A round of financing at $10.2 million, a round that was led by Vancouver angel investors Markus Frind, founder of dating website Plenty of Fish, and Lance Tracey, founder of Internet hosting services company Peer 1 Hosting.

Grow was acquired by ATB Financial in November 2019.
