= Erica Grow =

American meteorologist and television reporter (born 1980)

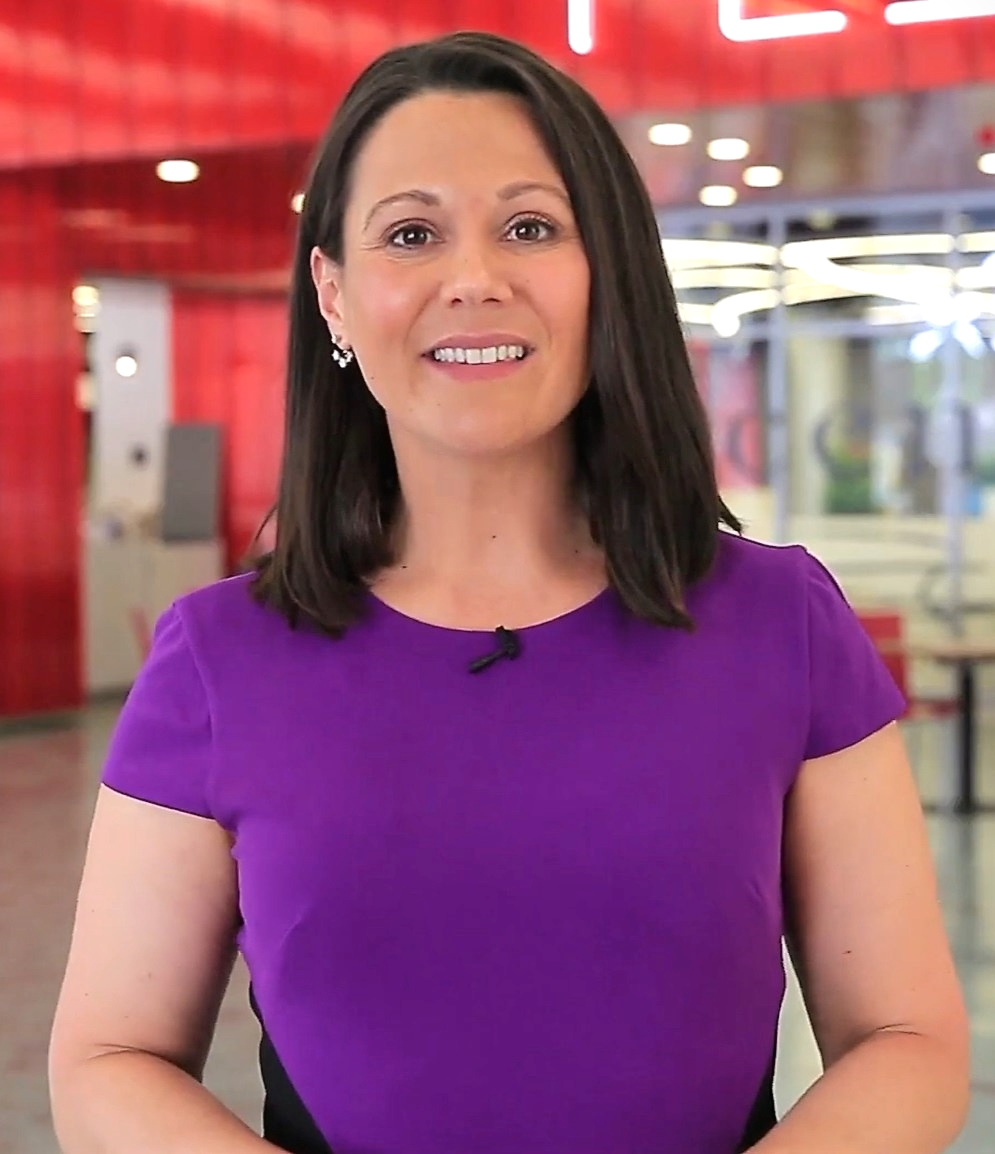
- Grow in 2019
- Born: Erica Alicia Grow-Cei; March 15, 1980 (age 46); Bethlehem, Pennsylvania, U.S.
- Education: Pennsylvania State University (BS in meteorology)
- Years active: 2002–present
- Title: Meteorologist

Erica Alicia Grow-Cei (born March 15, 1980) is an American meteorologist and television reporter for WPIX Channel 11 in New York City.

== Early life and education ==
Erica Grow was born and raised in Bethlehem in Pennsylvania's Lehigh Valley. She attended Liberty High School in Bethlehem. She graduated from Penn State with a bachelor of science degree in meteorology in 2002.

== Broadcasting career ==
After graduating from Penn State, Grow became a meteorologist and weather producer for KMID-TV in Midland and Odessa, Texas, writing and producing the "Weather Wise" segment. She left Midland to join the crew of WHP-TV in Harrisburg, Pennsylvania as a meteorologist and reporter.

In 2007, Grow became a weather anchor for WPVI-TV's 6ABC Action News on Saturday and Sunday mornings in Philadelphia. She became active in education initiatives in Philadelphia area schools, and represented 6ABC at community events such as the Philadelphia Flower Show, Philadelphia Auto Show, and the 6ABC Holiday Food Drive. Grow left WPVI in 2010.

Shortly after, in 2011, she was hired to forecast, produce and anchor weather segments for WTNH-TV News 8 in New Haven, Connecticut, where she was also active in the community visiting schools with the News 8 "Mobile Weather Lab" vehicle. In 2012, Grow earned the Certified Broadcast Meteorologist (CBM) Seal of Approval from the American Meteorological Society. She left WTNH in 2012.

In September 2012, Grow worked on-air at CBS affiliate WUSA in Washington, D.C., as a meteorologist for the weekend evening newscasts. Grow left WUSA in 2015.

In September 2015, Grow became the new weekend evening meteorologist for flagship NBC station WNBC in New York City. She now is the meteorologist for WPIX (Channel 11) in New York City.

Since May 2025, Grow has worked as a spokesperson in the National Press Office for the National Weather Service.

== Personal life ==
Grow is married to Kevin Cei, who also graduated from Penn State in meteorology.
