= GROW (series) =

- Genre: Puzzle
- Developer: On
- Publisher: On
- Creator: On

GROW is a series of Flash and HTML5-based puzzle video games created by Japanese independent developer On Nakayama and posted to his website, eyezmaze.com. The series was launched on February 7, 2002 and comprises 12 full games, 7 minigames, and 1 canceled game. The most recently released title is from June 2018. The games use a simple click-button interface requiring the player to determine the correct combination of buttons to click to maximize visual reward and ultimately to achieve the good ending. Graphically spare and minimalist, GROW games employ a cute aesthetic and often include creatures and characters taken from On's other games like those in the Tontie Series.

The games have received largely positive reviews with the main criticisms restricted to a formulaic quality of the main series and a lack of replay value. Positive reviews have emphasized the games' simple whimsy and innocent aesthetics and the creativity of the underlying concept. Although widely recognized as a puzzle game, a paper by the 2008 IGDA noted that "the Grow series is an example of a game that defined a new genre of games."

== Gameplay ==
The player is presented with a number of buttons related to characteristics of the game world. Clicking a button will usually result in a change to the corresponding part of the game world. The puzzle is to determine the order in which to push the buttons to achieve the good ending. The number of buttons in each game varies between 5 and 12. The number of different combinations possible with each additional button, however, increases according to a factorial progression. Thus, a game with 5 buttons will have 120 possible combinations (of which only one leads to the good ending) and a game with 12 buttons will have 479 million possible combinations.

Components of the game world go through a leveling up process after each selection is made. Because previously engaged components of the game world remain on the screen, later button pushes will often allow new areas of the environment to interact with previous areas. These interactions may cause the environmental component to level up, level down, or remain the same. By keeping track of which buttons have which effects on the other parts of the game world, the player can home in on the good ending by maximizing the visual reward. Once all components have been maximized and the world is fully developed, the player wins.

Each game in the main series has a good ending, many bad endings, and often a secret easter egg ending. Titles in the MiniGROW series, however, tend to be much smaller and simpler, ranging from 6 buttons to as few as 3.

== History ==
The first game that was released in the GROW series was GROW ver.3 in February 2002. This was the third version of a single game that On had been developing (the first two versions were substantially identical to ver.3 except that they lacked music and a score) in 2001–2002. Upon release, On decided to retain the "ver.3" part of the title rather than naming the game simply GROW as he had originally intended. On continued to develop other games in the GROW series after this point including GROW Cube and GROW ORNAMENT, and in 2005-2006 his games had become popular enough with gamers that Western gaming press began to cover his work. After receiving numerous questions regarding why the GROW series seemed to begin with "ver.3" instead of "ver.1" and where "ver.1" and "ver.2" could be located, On decided to recreate new reduced versions for ver.2 and ver.1 which he released in that order in June and December 2006 respectively.

With growing English, Spanish, Korean, Chinese, and French interest in the games, On translated the website into the relevant languages in April 2009. A series of GROW comics were also initiated in April 2015 to showcase concept art for the series.

The series was originally released on Adobe Flash, later ported to HTML5 and the Flash version shut down along with Flash.

On March 5, 2020, the server hosting eyezmaze.com crashed. On has stated on Twitter that the last backup made of the website was in 2016, and that the server administrator was too busy to fix the issue. The site has since come back online.

Since 2020, there have been no updates to any of the games and no new games.

== Reception ==
Despite their simplicity, the GROW games have received largely favorable reviews. PC Gamer's Jaz McDougall described the spare cartoon visuals as productive of a surreal playing experience and suggested that some of the more complex titles in the series could benefit from group playing by multiple players. Rock, Paper, Shotgun's Alec Meer describes the series as "endearing" and "dreamlike", while The Guardian's Naomi Alderman described them as "enchanting", "whimsical" and child-friendly. Indiegames.com writer Michael Rose noted that GROW games make the player "feel all good inside" and described the experience of playing GROW as akin to "pressing buttons on an exhibit in a museum ... to watch the world evolve." GameSetWatch's Eric Caoili has emphasized On's use of humor to reward players who are making progress even when just exploring. The regularity of On's releases has also drawn praise from reviewers like the New York Times' Charles Herold. Industry insiders including game developers Dave Grossman and Spry Fox have also praised the series.

Criticism has mostly been restricted to the claim that the gameplay is largely formulaic between different titles, though reviewers have noted that games like GROW Cannon and GROW RPG have been able to provide sufficient variation to keep the series interesting. The A.V. Club's Gameological Society has also criticized the games in terms of their replay value, stating "[t]he Grow games weren't much fun to play more than once."

== GROW Series ==
=== Main Series ===
- GROW ver.3 (Note: Renamed to GROW Planet.) (February 2002; Remake: June 2009)
- GROW RPG (July 2005; ported to Android and iOS platforms in April 2015)
- GROW Cube (September 2005; ported to Android and iOS platforms in September 2014 and October 2014)
- GROW ver.2 (June 2006; ported to Android and iOS platforms as GROW JUNGLE in April 2015 and August 2015)
- GROW ver.1 (December 2006; Remakes: May–July 2008)
- GROW Island (September 2007)
- GROW Tower (January 2009)
- GROW Valley (August 2010)
- GROW Cannon (January 2011)
- GROW Forest (canceled December 2012)
- GROW Maze (March 2013)
- GROW Clay (February 2014)
- GROW Park (July 2015 for Android; August 2015 for iOS and PC)

=== MiniGROW Series ===
- GROW ORNAMENT (December 2005; ported to Android and iOS platforms in December 2015)
- GROW Nano ver.0 (July 2006)
- GROW Nano vol.1 (August 2006)
- GROW Nano vol.2 (Note: Renamed to GROW SunBoy.) (February 2007)
- GROW Nano vol.3 (February 2008; ported to Android and iOS platforms as GROW RECOVERY in April 2015 and July 2015)
- GROW Nano vol.4 (Note: Renamed to GROW Figure.) (May 2011)
- GROW Cinderella (October 2016)
- GROW Comeback (June 2018)
- GROW Thanks (November 2018)
