= Bethlehem Area School District =

School district in Pennsylvania

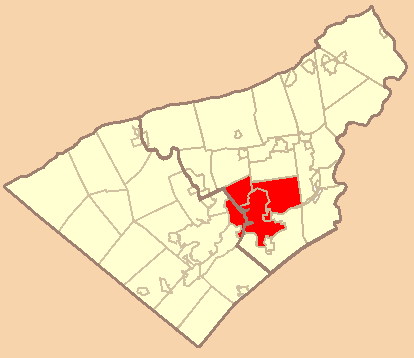
- Bethlehem Area School District in Lehigh and Northampton Counties, Pennsylvania

Address
- 1516 Sycamore Street Bethlehem, Pennsylvania, 18017; United States

District information
- Type: Public
- Motto: "Shaping the Future. One Child at a Time."
- Schools: 22, including Freedom High School and Liberty High School
- Budget: $340.268 million
- NCES District ID: 4203570

Students and staff
- Students: 12,769 (2024-25)
- Teachers: 991.2 (on an FTE basis)
- Student–teacher ratio: 12.88
- Athletic conference: Eastern Pennsylvania Conference

Other information
- Website: www.basdschools.org

Bethlehem Area School District is a large public school district serving the city of Bethlehem and its surrounding boroughs of Fountain Hill and Freemansburg, and Bethlehem and Hanover townships across both Lehigh and Northampton Counties in the Lehigh Valley region of eastern Pennsylvania.

Bethlehem Area School District operates 22 schools: two high schools, four middle schools, and 16 elementary schools. Students in ninth through 12th grades attend one of two large high schools in the district: Freedom High School in Bethlehem Township and Liberty High School in Bethlehem. The district's four middle schools for sixth through eighth grades are: Broughal Middle School, East Hills Middle School, Nitschmann Middle School, and Northeast Middle School.

The district's 16 elementary schools for kindergarten through fifth grade are: Asa Packer Elementary School, Calypso Elementary School, Clearview Elementary School, Donegan Elementary School, Farmersville Elementary School, Fountain Hill Elementary School, Fountain Hill Kindergarten Center, Freemansburg Elementary School, Governor Wolf Elementary School, Hanover Elementary School, James Buchanan Elementary School, Lincoln Elementary School, Marvine Elementary School, Miller Heights Elementary School, Spring Garden Elementary School, Thomas Jefferson Elementary School, and William Penn Elementary School. High school students may choose to attend the Bethlehem Area Vocational-Technical School for training in the construction and mechanical trades. As of the 2024–25 school year, the school district had a total enrollment of 12,769 students between its 22 schools, according to National Center for Education Statistics data.

The district encompasses approximately 42.3 square miles (110 km^{2}). As of the 2000 census, it served a resident population of 108,000. By 2010, the district's population increased to 116,968 people. The educational attainment levels for the Bethlehem Area School District population (25 years old and over) were 87.9% high school graduates and 30.5% college graduates.

According to the Pennsylvania Budget and Policy Center, 49.9% of the district's pupils lived at 185% or below the federal poverty level as shown by their eligibility for the federal free or reduced price school meal programs in 2012. In 2013, the Pennsylvania Department of Education, reported that 285 students in the Bethlehem Area School District were homeless.

The Colonial Intermediate Units IU20 provides the district with a wide variety of services like: specialized education for disabled students; state mandated training on recognizing and reporting child abuse; speech and visual disability services; criminal background check processing for prospective employees and professional development for staff and faculty.

== Schools ==
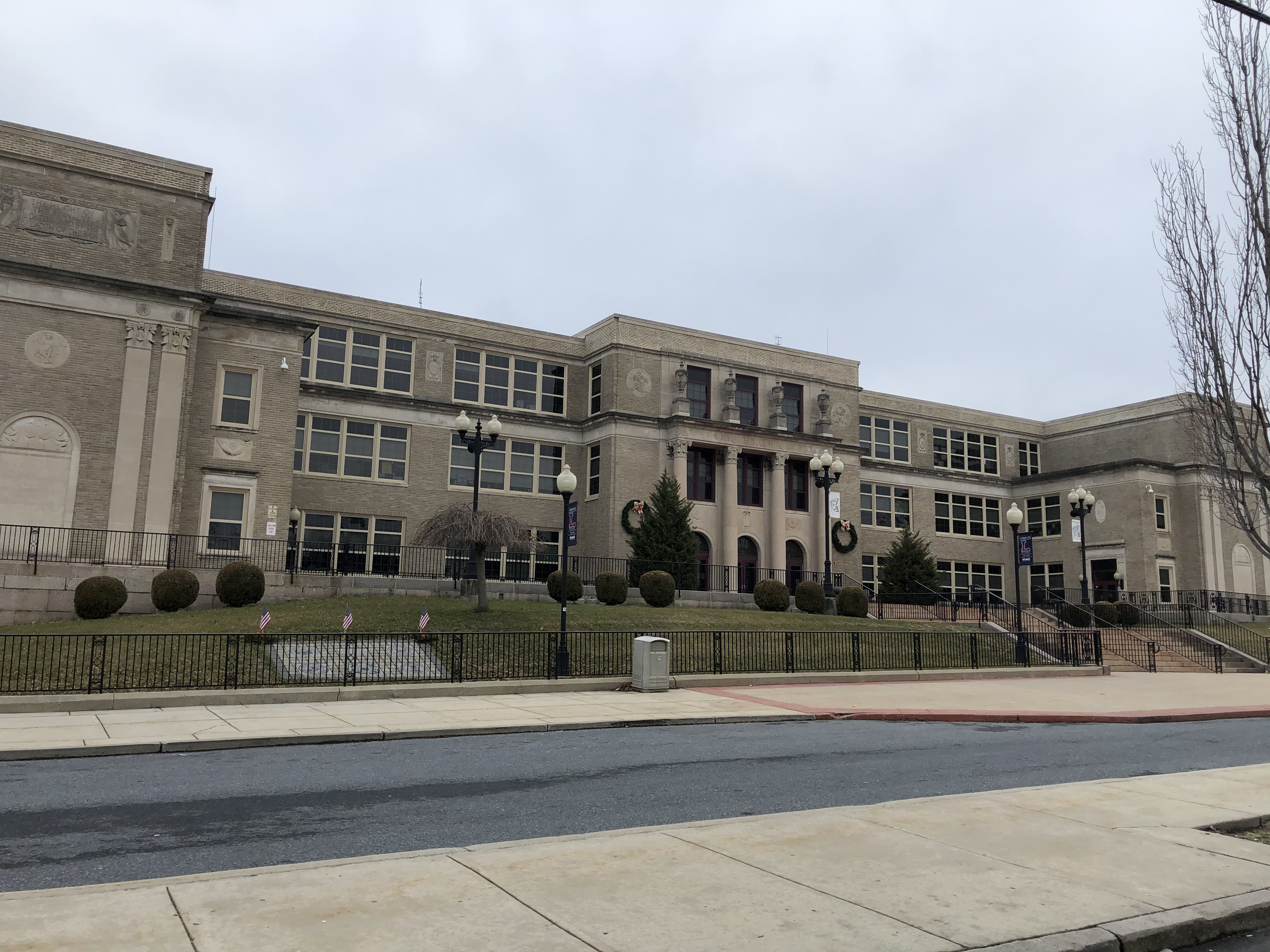
Liberty High School in Bethlehem, the larger of two large public high schools in the Bethlehem Area School District, February 2020

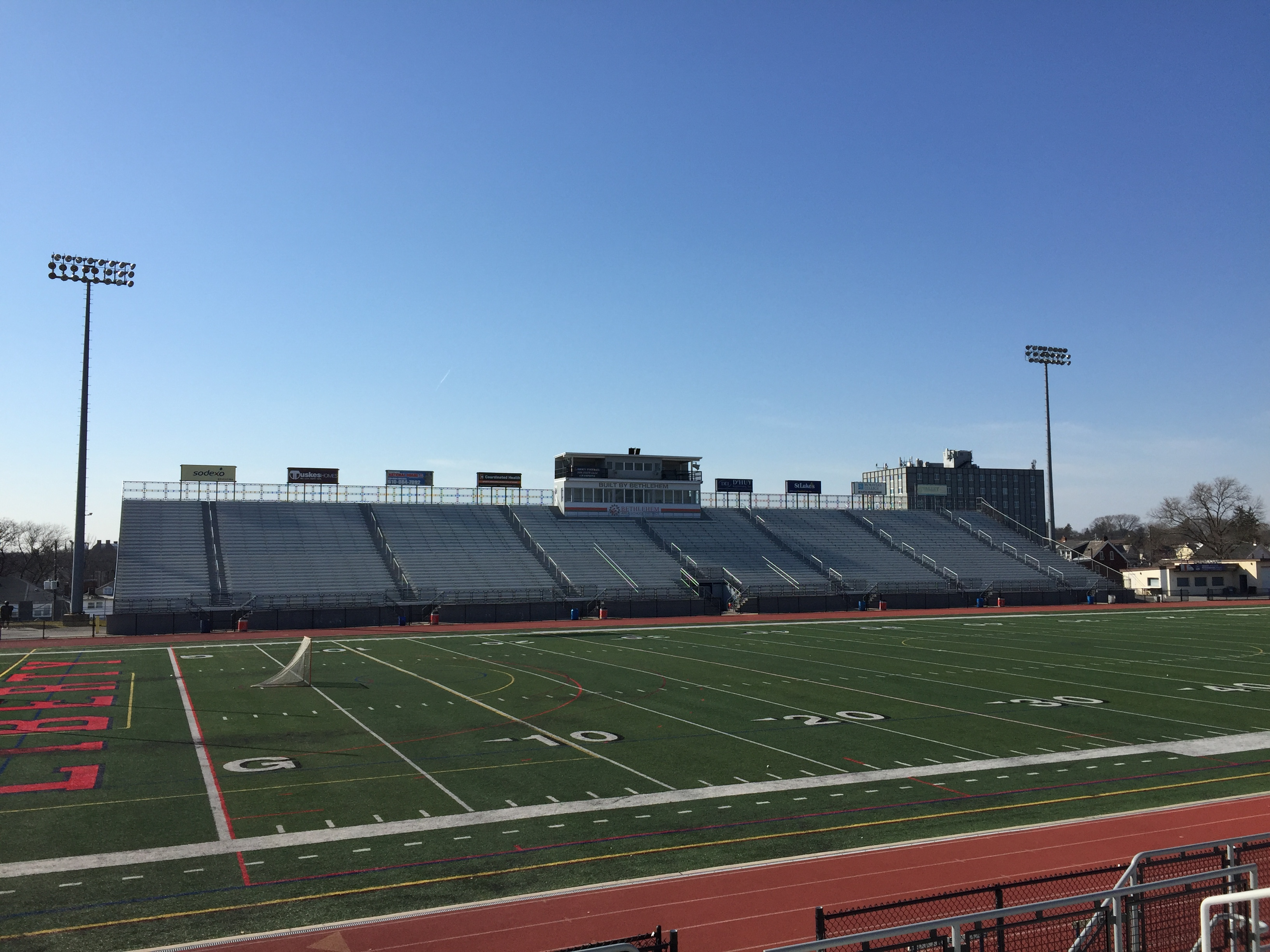
BASD Stadium, a 14,000 capacity stadium in Bethlehem, the home field for both of Bethlehem Area School District's high school football teams, Freedom High School and Liberty High School

=== High schools ===
- Freedom High School, Bethlehem Township
- Liberty High School, Bethlehem

=== Middle schools ===
- Broughal Middle School
- East Hills Middle School
- Nitschmann Middle School
- Northeast Middle School

=== Elementary schools ===
- Asa Packer Elementary School
- Calypso Elementary School
- Clearview Elementary School
- Donegan Elementary School
- Farmersville Elementary School
- Fountain Hill Elementary School
- Fountain Hill Kindergarten Center
- Freemansburg Elementary School
- Governor Wolf Elementary School
- Hanover Elementary School
- James Buchanan Elementary School
- Lincoln Elementary School
- Marvine Elementary School
- Miller Heights Elementary School
- Spring Garden Elementary School
- Thomas Jefferson Elementary School
- William Penn Elementary School

== Athletics ==
Both Bethlehem Area School District high schools compete in the Eastern Pennsylvania Conference. Bethlehem high schools also have an ice hockey team, which competes as one of the eleven Lehigh Valley-area high school teams in the Lehigh Valley Scholastic Ice Hockey League.
