= MLB Industry Growth Fund =

MLB Industry Growth Fund is a pool of money collected by Major League Baseball. The purpose of the Industry Growth Fund (IGF) is, essentially, to promote Major League Baseball. Specifically, there are three goals; to enhance fan interest in the game, to increase baseball's popularity, and to ensure industry growth into the 21st century. It was created as part of the Major League Baseball (MLB) Collective Bargaining Agreement (CBA) in 1997.

The IGF is managed by a seven-member board of directors. The board of directors meets in person at least three times per year.

Funding for the IGF comes, primarily, from the MLB Competitive Balance Tax. Additional funds may also come from the Major League Baseball Players Association (MLBPA) or the individual baseball clubs.
