= Freemansburg, Pennsylvania =

Borough in Pennsylvania, US

Borough of Freemansburg
- Borough
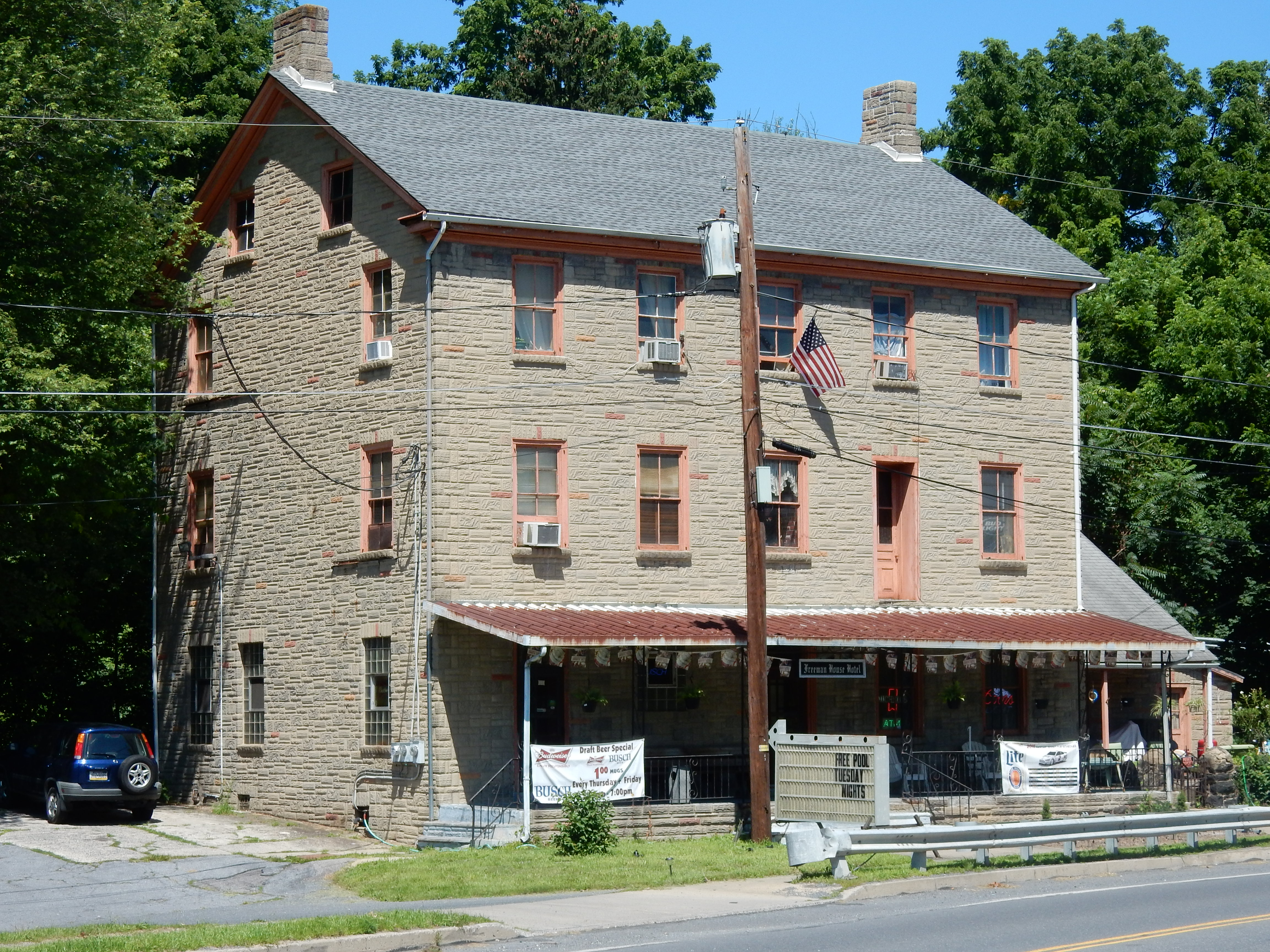
- Jacob Freeman House in Freemansburg in July 2015

- Seal

- Location of Freemansburg in Northampton County, Pennsylvania (left) and of Northampton County in Pennsylvania (right)

- Location of Freemansburg in Pennsylvania Freemansburg (the United States)
- Coordinates: 40°37′38″N 75°20′23″W
- Country: United States
- State: Pennsylvania
- County: Northampton

Government
  - Mayor: Gerald C. Yob

Area
  - Borough: 0.75 sq mi (1.93 km^{2})
  - Land: 0.70 sq mi (1.81 km^{2})
  - Water: 0.046 sq mi (0.12 km^{2})
- Elevation: 325 ft (99 m)

Population (2020)
  - Borough: 2,875
  - Density: 4,122.0/sq mi (1,591.51/km^{2})
  - Metro: 865,310 (US: 68th)
- Time zone: UTC-5 (EST)
  - Summer (DST): UTC-4 (EDT)
- ZIP Code: 18017
- Area codes: 610 and 484
- FIPS code: 42-27760
- Primary airport: Lehigh Valley International Airport
- Major hospital: Lehigh Valley Hospital–Cedar Crest
- School district: Bethlehem Area
- Website: www.boroughoffreemansburg.org

Freemansburg is a borough in Northampton County, Pennsylvania, United States. The population was 2,875 as of the 2020 census. The Lehigh River, a 109-mile-long (175 km) tributary of the Delaware River, flows through Freemansburg.

Freemansburg is part of the Lehigh Valley metropolitan area, which had a population of 861,899 and was the 68th-most populous metropolitan area in the U.S. as of the 2020 census.

== History ==
The area that would become Freemansburg was first settled by the Bachman family in the 1760s with their old stone house, which also doubled as a tavern, still standing on the western edge of the borough. The Bachmans resisted several attacks from local Indians who lived on the opposite bank of the Lehigh River. Shortly afterwards the Bachmans were joined by the Freemans as well as Moravians from neighboring Bethlehem who built a series of mills, as well as a distillery and tavern.

In 1811 a bridge was built across the Lehigh River at Freemansburg and the first physician moved into the area in 1817, as well as the opening of the first general store in 1825. By the 1830s the hamlet was starting to develop into a municipality within its own right, as a public school was built in 1838. Also in the 1830s the eponymous Jacob Freeman began operating a local tavern. Freemansburg would become an incorporated borough in January 1856. It originally had a Chief Burgess system of government, like many municipalities in Pennsylvania, where the executive of the government was a mostly powerless honorary position elected for one year terms from among members of the city council. The first Chief Burgess was George Bachman, and the first members of the city council were: William Gwinner the council President, Amos Seip, John Warg, Thomas Doney, and R. O. Lerch. They would be sworn in on March 29, 1856.

The town is notable for having a seven-member city council, the same size as that of Bethlehem, despite Bethlehem having a population nearly 4000% larger than Freemansburg. Additionally, this council has seen high turnover of membership and rather vitriolic debates and name calling as well as a deep-seated rivalry between true "burgers", people born and raised in the borough, and those who moved in from Bethlehem after the closing of the Bethlehem Works.

== Geography ==
Freemansburg is located at 40°37′38″N 75°20′23″W (40.627348, -75.339815). According to the U.S. Census Bureau, the borough has a total area of 0.8 square miles (2.1 km^{2}), of which 0.7 square miles (1.8 km^{2}) is land and 0.04 square miles (0.10 km^{2}) (5.26%) is water.

== Transportation ==
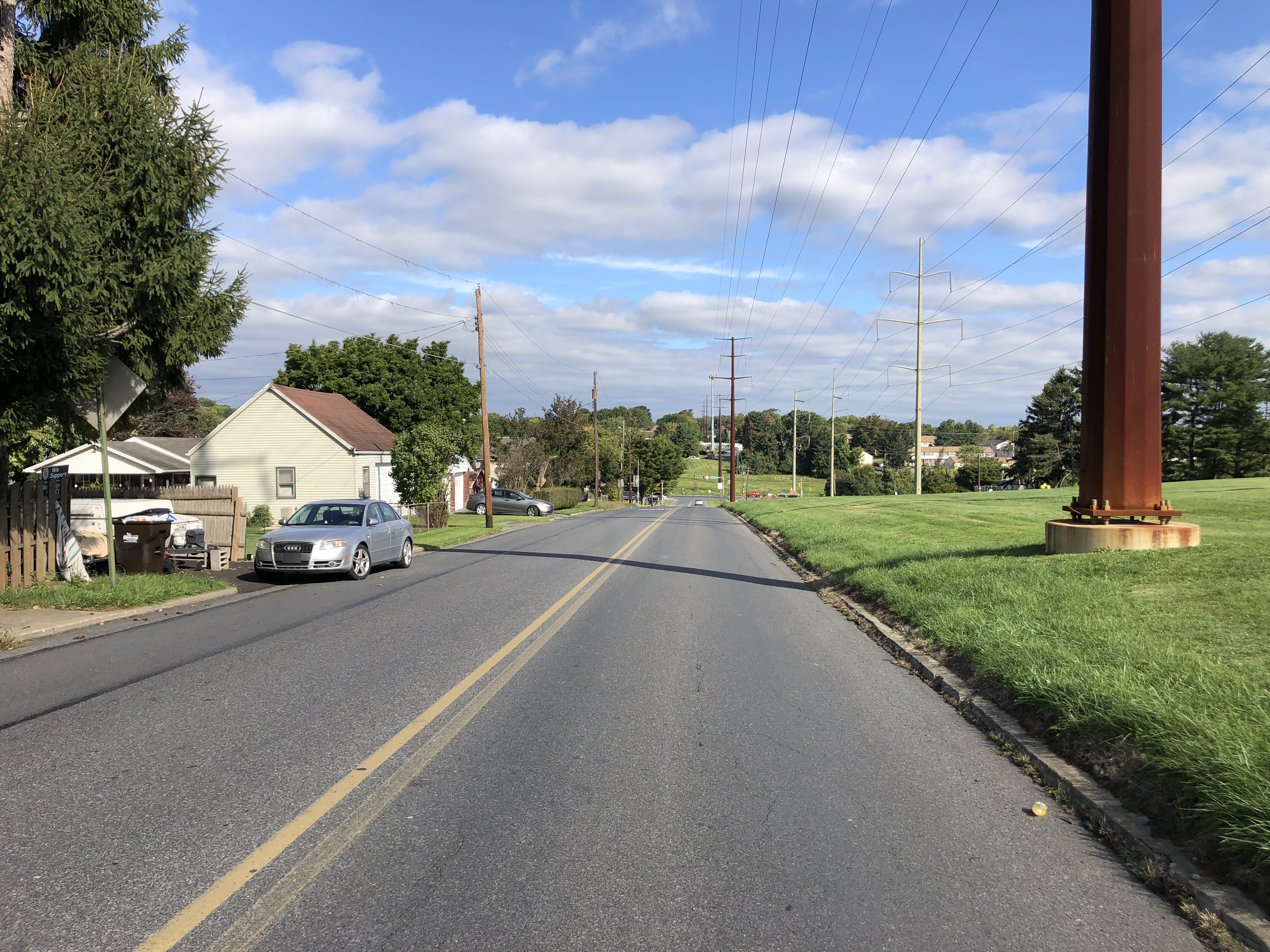
Cambria Street in Freemansburg

As of 2018, there were 10.24 miles (16.48 km) of public roads in Freemansburg, of which 1.88 miles (3.03 km) were maintained by the Pennsylvania Department of Transportation (PennDOT) and 8.36 miles (13.45 km) were maintained by the borough.

No numbered highways pass through Freemansburg directly. Main thoroughfares traversing the borough include Freemansburg Avenue, Washington Street, Main Street, Market Street and Cambria Street.

== Demographics ==
Historical population
Census	Pop.	Note	%±
1860	649		—
1870	643		−0.9%
1880	634		−1.4%
1890	615		−3.0%
1900	596		−3.1%
1910	867		45.5%
1920	1,203		38.8%
1930	1,777		47.7%
1940	1,728		−2.8%
1950	1,739		0.6%
1960	1,652		−5.0%
1970	1,681		1.8%
1980	1,879		11.8%
1990	1,946		3.6%
2000	1,897		−2.5%
2010	2,636		39.0%
2020	2,875		9.1%

As of 2010, the population has increased 39.0% from 2000 to 2010, which there were 2,636 people in the borough. The 2010 racial makeup of the borough has dramatically changed as well. In 2010, the borough was 59.7% (Whites), 12.7% (African Americans), 0.3% (Native Americans), 0.8% (Asians), 0.04% (Pacific Islander), and 2.0% from two or more races. Hispanic or Latino of any race were 24% of the population.

There were 687 households, out of which 34.4% had children under the age of 18 living with them, 54.4% were married couples living together, 11.5% had a female householder with no husband present, and 28.2% were non-families. 23.3% of all households were made up of individuals, and 8.4% had someone living alone who was 65 years of age or older. The average household size was 2.64 and the average family size was 3.06.

In the borough, the population was spread out, with 24.8% under the age of 18, 9.5% from 18 to 24, 34.2% from 25 to 44, 19.0% from 45 to 64, and 12.5% who were 65 years of age or older. The median age was 36 years. For every 100 females there were 101.8 males. For every 100 females age 18 and over, there were 98.7 males. The median income for a household in the borough was $44,297, and the median income for a family was $48,333. Males had a median income of $31,994 versus $24,853 for females. The per capita income for the borough was $17,983. About 6.7% of families and 9.4% of the population were below the poverty line, including 11.0% of those under age 18 and 6.9% of those age 65 or over.

== Public education ==
The borough is served by the Bethlehem Area School District.
