= Saucon =

Saucon may refer to the following in Pennsylvania:

- Saucon Creek, a tributary of the Lehigh River
- Saucon Valley, Pennsylvania, in the Lehigh Valley region of eastern Pennsylvania
  - Lower Saucon Township, Pennsylvania, in the Lehigh Valley
  - Upper Saucon Township, Pennsylvania, in the Lehigh Valley
- Saucon Valley Country Club, in Upper Saucon Township, Pennsylvania
- Saucon Valley School District, in Northampton County, Pennsylvania
