= Polk Valley Run =

River in Pennsylvania, United States

Polk Valley Run Poke Valley Run, Snipe Valley Creek

Physical characteristics
- Source
  - location: valley between Kohlberg and Swoveberg in Lower Saucon Township, Pennsylvania
  - elevation: 500 ft (150 m)
- Mouth
  - location: Saucon Creek in Hellertown, Pennsylvania
  - coordinates: 40°34′02″N 75°20′28″W
  - elevation: 289 ft (88 m)
- Length: 1.9 mi (3.1 km)
- Basin size: 2.13 mi^{2} (5.5 km^{2})
- Discharge
  - location: near Hellertown, Pennsylvania
  - minimum: 0.21 cu ft/s (0.0059 m^{3}/s)
  - maximum: nearly 450 cu ft/s (13 m^{3}/s)

Basin features
- Progression: Saucon Creek → Lehigh River → Delaware River → Delaware Bay

Polk Valley Run (also known as Poke Valley Run or Snipe Valley Creek) is a tributary of Saucon Creek in Northampton County, Pennsylvania. It is approximately 1.9 miles (3.1 km) long and flows through Lower Saucon Township and Hellertown. The watershed of the stream has an area of 2.13 square miles (5.5 km^{2}). A reach of the stream is designated as an impaired waterbody due to siltation from agriculture. However, wild trout and other wildlife are present in and around it. Most of the watershed is forested.

== Course ==
Polk Valley Run begins in a valley between Kohlberg and Swoveberg in Lower Saucon Township. It flows west-southwest for several tenths of a mile, passing through an unnamed pond, and eventually exiting the valley. The stream then turns west-northwest for several tenths of a mile before turning west and entering Hellertown. After a few tenths of a mile, it turns southwest, crossing Pennsylvania Route 412 and reaching its confluence with Saucon Creek.

Polk Valley Run joins Saucon Creek 4.50 miles (7.24 km) upstream of its mouth.

== Hydrology ==
In 14 measurements between 1962 and 1978, the discharge of Polk Valley Run at Hellertown ranged from 0.21 to 85.0 cubic feet per second (0.0059 to 2.4069 m^{3}/s). All but three measurements were under 10 cubic feet per second (0.28 m^{3}/s). Between the early 1960s and the early 1980s, the peak annual discharge of the stream ranged from just over 50 cubic feet per second (1.4 m^{3}/s) to nearly 450 cubic feet per second (13 m^{3}/s) one year in the mid-1970s.

A reach of Polk Valley Run is designated as an impaired waterbody due to siltation from agricultural activity. During a 24-day study period in August and September 2011, the turbidity of the stream was usually below 100 Nephelometric Turbidity Units, but spiked to over 200 during Hurricane Irene. A total of 13 cubic meters (460 cu ft) of suspended sediment was observed in the stream during the study period, including 8 cubic meters (280 cu ft) during the 48-hour Hurricane Irene. The sediment in the stream had finer sediments than those in some other nearby streams, such as Silver Creek.

== Geography and geology ==
The elevation near the mouth of Polk Valley Run is 289 feet (88 m) above sea level. The elevation near the source of the stream is 500 feet (150 m) above sea level.

Polk Valley Run has a shallow stream corridor in Hellertown. It often overruns its banks, adversely impacting nearby properties. Channelization and rebuilding a culvert carrying the stream under Main Street have been proposed as flood control measures.

The Hardyston Formation and felsic to mafic gneiss is present in the watershed of Polk Valley Run. The stream's valley is also home to some quartzite that is slightly atypical for the region: brittle and gray with pebbles up to three eighths of an inch in diameter.

== Watershed ==
The watershed of Polk Valley Run has an area of 2.13 square miles (5.5 km^{2}). The stream is entirely within the United States Geological Survey quadrangle of Hellertown.

The watershed of Polk Valley Run is mostly in Lower Saucon Township, but a small part of it is in Hellertown. The watershed is on the southern edge of the Saucon Creek watershed and borders the watershed of Silver Creek.

Upstream of the gauging station in the lower reaches of Polk Valley Run, more than three quarters of the stream's watershed is forested. The remainder is agricultural and suburban land, with the former being more common.

A 20-acre (8.1 ha) tract of land known as the Saucon Valley Environmental Education Center is in the vicinity of Polk Valley Run. The tract also contains scrub meadow and floodplain woodlands. The Hellertown Borough Authority draws water from springs in the stream's watershed.

== History ==
Polk Valley Run was entered into the Geographic Names Information System on August 2, 1979. Its identifier in the Geographic Names Information System is 1184211. The stream is also known as Poke Valley Run. This variant name appears in the 1939 Northampton County, Pennsylvania geological survey by Benjamin L. Miller and others. It has also been historically known as Snipe Valley Creek. Numerous explanations have been given for the stream's various names. The name "Poke Valley Run" may come from the "shite pokes" (small green herons) that once were common in the area, or from an abundance of pokeberry plants in the area. A very early name for the stream's valley, "Schnippe Thai" also comes from snipes. The name "Polk Valley Run" comes from James Polk, the 11th president of the United States.

Springs in the valley of Polk Valley Run have supplied Hellertown with water since at least the 1930s.

Properties along Polk Valley Run were damaged during flooding from Hurricane Irene in 2011. The Polk Valley Road Connector Trail, a 1,270-foot (390 m) paved asphalt trail between Polk Valley Park and the Saucon Valley School District campus, crosses Polk Valley Run via a pedestrian bridge. The trail was completed in April 2012.

== Biology ==
Wild trout naturally reproduce in Polk Valley Run from its headwaters downstream to its mouth. Numerous species are present in the vicinity of Polk Valley Run at the Saucon Valley Environmental Education Center. These include songbirds, red foxes, wood turtles, and fish. Plant species in the area include sycamores, pear trees, red cedars, and willows, as well as wildflowers and seasonal grasses.

In 2006, Polk Valley Run in Lower Saucon Township was identified as one of the areas in the Saucon Creek watershed most in need of habitat restoration. As of 2013, the Saucon Creek Watershed Association is committed to improving riparian buffers along Polk Valley Run to reduce streambank erosion.

== See also ==
- List of rivers of Pennsylvania
- Silver Creek (Saucon Creek), next tributary of Saucon Creek going downstream
