= Silver Creek (Saucon Creek tributary) =

River in Pennsylvania, United States

Physical characteristics
- Source
  - location: east of Swoveberg Hill in Lower Saucon Township, Pennsylvania
  - elevation: between 640 and 660 feet (200 and 200 m)
- Mouth
  - location: Saucon Creek in Hellertown, Pennsylvania
  - coordinates: 40°34′44″N 75°20′42″W
  - elevation: 269 feet (82 m)
- Length: 3.2 mi (5.1 km)
- Basin size: 2.89 mi^{2} (7.5 km^{2})

Basin features
- Progression: Saucon Creek → Lehigh River → Delaware River → Delaware Bay

Silver Creek is a tributary of Saucon Creek in Northampton County, Pennsylvania. It is approximately 3.2 miles (5.1 km) long and flows through Lower Saucon Township and Hellertown. The watershed of the creek has an area of 2.89 square miles (7.5 km^{2}). The creek is a very small stream that is urban in its lower reaches. However, it is not designated as an impaired waterbody and is inhabited by trout. The creek has been a major source of flooding in Hellertown.

== Course ==
Silver Creek begins to the east of a hill known as Swoveberg. It flows north-northwest and then turns west for several tenths of a mile, heading into a valley between Swoveberg, Kirchberg, and Focht Hill and then flows west-southwest for more than a mile before turning west-northwest for a few tenths of a mile and reaching the border of Hellertown, where it flows north along the border for a short distance before turning west into Hellertown. The creek then flows southwest and west-southwest for several tenths of a mile before crossing Pennsylvania Route 412 and reaching its confluence with Saucon Creek after a few tenths of a mile.

Silver Creek joins Saucon Creek 3.60 miles (5.79 km) upstream of its mouth.

== Hydrology ==
Silver Creek is not designated as an impaired waterbody.

At the downstream border of Hellertown, the peak annual discharge of Silver Creek has a 10 percent chance of reaching 600 cubic feet per second (17 m^{3}/s). It has a 2 percent chance of reaching 1,300 cubic feet per second (37 m^{3}/s) and a 1 percent chance of reaching 1,700 cubic feet per second (48 m^{3}/s). The peak annual discharge has a 0.2 percent chance of reaching 2,900 cubic feet per second (82 m^{3}/s).

In November 1955, the discharge of Silver Creek at Hellertown was measured to be 5.45 cubic feet per second (0.154 m^{3}/s). In October, 1968, it was measured to be only 0.15 cubic feet per second (0.0042 m^{3}/s).

== Geography and geology ==
The elevation near the mouth of Silver Creek is 269 feet (82 m) above sea level. The elevation near the source of the creek is between 640 and 660 feet (200 and 200 m) above sea level. The creek is a very small stream that is an urban stream flowing through Hellertown in its lower reaches. In 2000, it was observed that many tires and broken soda bottles littered the creek.

Hardyston Quartzite is present in the valley of Silver Creek and ranges from white chert to arkosic quartzite and is rich in pyrite in this area. Gneiss is also present in the valley. Signs of faulting in the valley include springs and an unusually shaped window of gneiss. Jasper and small, weathered crystals of quartz can be found in Silver Creek throughout its length.

Silver Creek is described as a "clear attractive stream" in Benjamin LeRoy Miller's 1939 book Northampton County, Pennsylvania: Geology and Geography. The headwaters of Silver Creek are in the Wassergass. The Heller homestead is located near its mouth.

== Watershed ==
The watershed of Silver Creek has an area of 2.89 square miles (7.5 km^{2}). The creek is entirely within the United States Geological Survey quadrangle of Hellertown.

The watershed of Silver Creek is mostly in Lower Saucon Township, but its lower reaches are in Hellertown. The watershed borders those of East Branch Saucon Creek and Polk Valley Run.

Silver Creek is a major source of flooding in Hellertown. It has impacted the community during flooding in September, 2004, as well as during two heavy storms in 2005. The creek was in fact the primary source of flooding in Hellertown during the 2004 flood.

== History and recreation ==
Silver Creek was entered into the Geographic Names Information System on August 2, 1979. Its identifier in the Geographic Names Information System is 1187669.

Historically, there were iron mines in the valley of Silver Creek. In the late 19th century, people would commonly picnic at Silver Creek and explore a nearby cave. One reach of the creek flows through a private golf course.

A concrete stringer/multi-beam or girder bridge carrying Northampton Street was built over Silver Creek in 1920. Another bridge of the same type, but carrying Front Street, was built over the creek in 1937. A concrete slab bridge carrying Harris Street was constructed across the creek in 1954 and reconstructed in 2013. Another concrete slab bridge was built over the creek in 1960, carrying Rentzheimer Drive. In 1964, a concrete slab bridge carrying Reservoir Road was built over the creek in Hellertown. A covered bridge was also built over the creek outside of Hellertown at some point.

== Biology ==
Wild trout naturally reproduce in Silver Creek from its headwaters downstream to its mouth. According to Trout Unlimited's Guide to Pennsylvania Limestone Streams, it is barely large enough to support trout, and none were observed when the author visited.

In 2006, the reach of Silver Creek that flows through Hellertown was identified as one of the areas in the Saucon Creek watershed that is most in need of habitat restoration.

== See also ==
- Black River (Saucon Creek), next tributary of Saucon Creek going downstream
- List of rivers of Pennsylvania
- Polk Valley Run, next tributary of Saucon Creek going upstream
