= Black River (Saucon Creek tributary) =

River in Pennsylvania, United States

Black River Black Creek, Black River Creek

Physical characteristics
- Source
  - location: Upper Saucon Township, Pennsylvania
  - elevation: 700 ft (210 m)
- Mouth
  - location: Saucon Creek in Hellertown, Pennsylvania
  - coordinates: 40°35′07″N 75°20′54″W
  - elevation: 259 ft (79 m)
- Length: 4.6 mi (7.4 km)
- Basin size: 4.49 mi^{2} (11.6 km^{2})
- Discharge
  - location: private road near Wydnor (April 1959)
  - minimum: 2.14 cu ft/s (0.061 m^{3}/s)
  - maximum: 2.80 cu ft/s (0.079 m^{3}/s)

Basin features
- Progression: Saucon Creek → Lehigh River → Delaware River → Delaware Bay

Black River (also known as Black Creek or Black River Creek) is a tributary of Saucon Creek in Lehigh and Northampton counties in the US state of Pennsylvania. It is approximately 4.6 miles (7.4 km) long and flows through Upper Saucon and Salisbury townships in Lehigh County and Lower Saucon Township and Bethlehem in Northampton County.

The watershed of the river has an area of 4.49 square miles (11.6 km^{2}). It is designated as a Coldwater Fishery and a Migratory Fishery and contains wild trout. The river is a very small limestone stream and flows in the vicinity of Lehigh University's Saucon Fields.

== Course ==
The Black River begins on a hill in Upper Saucon Township. It flows north-northeast for a few tenths of a mile, then continues north-northeast for several tenths of a mile as the border between Salisbury Township and Lower Saucon Township. It passes through an unnamed pond and then turns east for several tenths of a mile, entering Lower Saucon Township in Northampton County. It then heads in a southeasterly direction for over a mile, crossing Interstate 78. It gradually turns northeast, passing through another pond before heading in an easterly direction and entering Bethlehem. Some distance later, the river turns east-northeast for a few tenths of a mile before turning north for a few tenths of a mile and reaching its confluence with Saucon Creek.

Black River joins Saucon Creek 3.40 miles (5.47 km) upstream of its mouth.

== Hydrology ==
Black River is not designated as an impaired waterbody.

At its mouth, the peak annual discharge has a 10 percent chance of reaching 950 cubic feet per second (27 m^{3}/s). It has a two percent chance of reaching 2,100 cubic feet per second (59 m^{3}/s) and a 1 percent chance of reaching 2,800 cubic feet per second (79 m^{3}/s). The peak annual discharge has a 0.2 percent chance of reaching 5,000 cubic feet per second (140 m^{3}/s).

In April 1959, measurements of Black River near a private road 0.3 miles (0.48 km) from Wydnor found the creek's discharge to be 2.80 and 2.14 cubic feet per second (0.079 and 0.061 m^{3}/s).

== Geography and geology ==
The elevation near the mouth of the Black River is 259 feet (79 m) above sea level. The elevation near the river's source is 700 feet (210 m) above sea level. The confluence of the Black River with Saucon Creek is approximately 0.5 miles (0.80 km) north of the confluence of Silver Creek with Saucon Creek.

The Black River is described as a "miserable ditch" in Trout Unlimited's Guide to Pennsylvania Limestone Streams. It is a very small stream with only a trickle of stormwater runoff flowing through it. However, it is a limestone stream.

== Watershed ==
The watershed of Black River has an area of 4.49 square miles (11.6 km^{2}). The mouth of the river is in the United States Geological Survey quadrangle of Hellertown. However, its source is in the quadrangle of Allentown East. The mouth of the river is at Hellertown.

Most of the watershed of Black River is in Lower Saucon Township, Northampton County. However, smaller areas occupy parts of Upper Saucon Township, Lehigh County; Salisbury Township, Lehigh County; and Bethlehem, Northampton County. The northernmost corner of the river's watershed borders the southernmost part of Fountain Hill.

Black River flows in the vicinity of the Saucon Fields tract of Lehigh University's campus in some reaches.

== History ==
Black River was entered into the Geographic Names Information System on August 2, 1979. Its identifier in the Geographic Names Information System is 1169729. The river is also known as Black Creek or Black River Creek. These variant names appear in Place Names of Northampton County, Pennsylvania, by James and Linda Wright, created in 1988.

A concrete tee beam bridge carrying PS State Route 3004 over Black River was built in 1938 0.75 miles (1.21 km) west of Hellertown. A prestressed box beam or girders bridge carrying State Route 3003 was built over the river in 1959.

== Biology ==
The drainage basin of the Black River is designated as a Coldwater Fishery and a Migratory Fishery. Wild trout naturally reproduce in the river from its headwaters downstream to its mouth. Trout Unlimited's Guide to Pennsylvania Limestone Streams reported in 2000, however, that it was "not trout water".

In 2006, Black River was identified as one of the places in the Saucon Creek watershed most in need of habitat restoration.

== See also ==
- East Branch Saucon Creek, next tributary of Saucon Creek going downstream
- Silver Creek (Saucon Creek), next tributary of Saucon Creek going upstream
