= East Branch Saucon Creek =

East Branch Saucon Creek Laubachs Creek

Physical characteristics
- Source
  - location: Lower Saucon Township, Pennsylvania
  - elevation: 795 feet (242 m)
- Mouth
  - location: Saucon Creek in Bethlehem, Pennsylvania
  - coordinates: 40°37′00″N 75°19′56″W
  - elevation: 210 feet (64 m)
- Length: 5.9 mi (9.5 km)
- Basin size: 10.3 mi^{2} (27 km^{2})

Basin features
- Progression: Saucon Creek → Lehigh River → Delaware River → Delaware Bay
- Tributaries
  - left: one unnamed tributary
  - right: four unnamed tributaries

East Branch Saucon Creek (also known as Laubachs Creek) is a tributary of Saucon Creek in Northampton County, Pennsylvania, in the United States. It is approximately 5.9 miles (9.5 km) long and flows through Lower Saucon Township and Bethlehem.

The watershed of the creek has an area of 10.3 square miles (27 km^{2}). A reach of the creek is designated as an impaired waterbody. However, the upper reaches are relatively unimpacted by development and the wetlands at its headwaters are designated as Exceptional Value and are home to numerous amphibians. The creek is also inhabited by wild trout.

Pioneers reached the area in the vicinity of East Branch Saucon Creek as early as the 1730s. More recently, Bethlehem Steel, the nation's second-largest steel manufacturer for much of the 20th century, owned a property in the watershed. Several bridges have constructed over the creek, and it once had a dam, but it was removed for safety reasons.

== Course ==
East Branch Saucon Creek begins in a pond in Lower Saucon Township near the Northampton County border with Bucks County. It flows northwest for several tenths of a mile before turning north and passing through a pond. After a few tenths of a mile, the creek turns west for a few tenths of a mile before turning north, passing between Focht Hill and Granite Hill. It then turns north-northeast for several tenths of a mile before receiving an unnamed tributary from the left and turning east-northeast. The creek then turns north for a short distance, receiving an unnamed tributary from the right before turning west-northwest and receiving another unnamed tributary from the right.

It then heads in a westerly direction for several tenths of a mile before crossing Interstate 78 and entering Bethlehem, where it receives another unnamed tributary from the right. Here, the creek continues flowing west, entering a deep, very narrow valley and passing near several railroad lines. It then turns west-northwest for several tenths of a mile before turning north for several tenths of a mile. At this point it receives an unnamed tributary from the right and passes by the southwestern corner of Green Hill before turning west and reaching its confluence with Saucon Creek.

East Branch Saucon Creek joins Saucon Creek 0.40 miles (0.64 km) upstream of its mouth.

== Hydrology ==
A reach of East Branch Saucon Creek is designated as an impaired waterbody. The cause of impairment is unknown, and probable sources include industrial point source discharge and urban runoff/storm sewers.

The sediment load in East Branch Saucon Creek has been found to be 3861 tons per year at the creek's mouth and 2289 tons per year further upstream, at the Northampton Sportsman's Club. Two sites in the upper reaches of the creek's watershed had sediment loads of 511 and 108 tons per year.

East Branch Saucon Creek has relatively warm water. In June 2000, the water temperature was measured to be 77 °F (25 °C) while the air temperature was only 74 °F (23 °C).

== Geography and geology ==
The elevation near the mouth of East Branch Saucon Creek is 210 feet (64 m) above sea level. The elevation near the creek's source is 795 feet (242 m) above sea level.

There are extensive wetlands at the headwaters of East Branch Saucon Creek. This area contains a "mosaic" of springs, seeps, streamlets, forested wetlands, and upland forests. There are also vernal pools and several man-made ponds there. A natural area on Granite Hill is in the vicinity of the creek. There is a flat-bottomed valley at the headwaters of the creek. It has been suggested that during the Illinoisan glaciation, ice in the Saucon Valley pushed into this part of the valley, carrying with it a large amount of cobbles from the Silurian and Devonian periods.

The headwaters of East Branch Saucon Creek are located in the Swabia Hills. There are a number of springs and seeps in the headwaters of the creek. Other features in the watershed of East Branch Saucon Creek include Saucon Pond, Campbell Pond and Martin Lake, and a volunteer fire company.

When constructing Interstate 78, the Pennsylvania Department of Transportation constructed a fish passage under a long culvert on East Branch Saucon Creek as well as installing riprap to create holding water.

== Watershed ==
The watershed of East Branch Saucon Creek has an area of 10.3 square miles (27 km^{2}). The stream is entirely within the United States Geological Survey quadrangle of Hellertown. The creek's mouth is in Bethlehem.

Most of the watershed of East Branch Saucon Creek is in Lower Saucon Township, but portions also are in Bethlehem, Williams Township, Bucks County, and a small corner is in Hellertown.

East Branch Saucon Creek passes through former Bethlehem Steel property north of Interstate 78. In this area, the creek's greenway provides little protection for it. However, most of the land in the vicinity of the creek south of Interstate 78 is densely forested with some rural residential development. The creek is located near Pennsylvania Highlands scenic greenway.

== History and recreation ==
East Branch Saucon Creek was entered into the Geographic Names Information System on August 2, 1979. Its identifier in the Geographic Names Information System is 1173769. The creek is also known as Laubachs Creek. This variant name appears in Place Names of Northampton County, Pennsylvania, by James and Linda Wright, created in 1988.

In 1735, Hans Georg Hertzell, a pioneer in Lower Saucon Township, was granted a warrant for surveying 300 acres (120 ha) near East Branch Saucon Creek. He and his family settled there and he named this tract of land "Partnership". However, the land was not officially surveyed until Nicholas Scull did so in 1737.

In the vicinity of the creek, there is a historic barn dating to the 1830s with many unusual features. A sawmill was historically located on the creek.

A concrete stringer/multi-beam or girder bridge carrying State Route 2001 was built over East Branch Saucon Creek in 1930. A concrete tee beam bridge carrying the same road over the creek was built in 1934. A steel stringer/multi-beam or girder bridge carrying State Route 2006 was built over the creek in 1956. In 2009, the Pennsylvania Department of Transportation made plans to paint a bridge carrying Raubsville Road over the creek in Lower Saucon Township.

Around 2000, a number of vernal ponds on the south side of East Branch Saucon Creek were destroyed by site preparation for a new residential development. Historically, the 2 by 50 feet (0.61 by 15.24 m) Lower Saucon Sportsmens Association Dam was on the creek, but it was removed for safety reasons.

East Branch Saucon Creek may be navigable by canoe, though the creek is not commonly used for this purpose. The creek was described in A. Joseph Armstrong's book Trout Unlimited's Guide to Pennsylvania Limestone Streams as a "nice-looking stream". An East Branch Saucon Creek County Park was proposed in the 1970s.

== Biology ==
In 2000, A. Joseph Armstrong observed in that there were no trout in East Branch Saucon Creek, and he doubted there would ever be. However, as of 2016, wild trout naturally reproduce in Saucon Creek from its headwaters downstream to its mouth.

In 2003, areas along East Branch Saucon Creek in Lower Saucon Township were identified to be in need of a riparian buffer. However, the headwaters are rich in biodiversity. There are habitats for numerous amphibians, including wood frogs and spring peepers. There are several types of wetland communities at the creek's headwaters, including "small sedge-dominated wetland openings" and wooded swamps with skunk cabbage on the ground. The Pennsylvania Department of Environmental Protection considers these wetlands to be Exceptional Value due to the presence of wild trout in the creek.

== See also ==
- Black River (Saucon Creek), next tributary of Saucon Creek going upstream
- List of rivers of Pennsylvania
