= Lutz-Franklin School =

- U.S. National Register of Historic Places
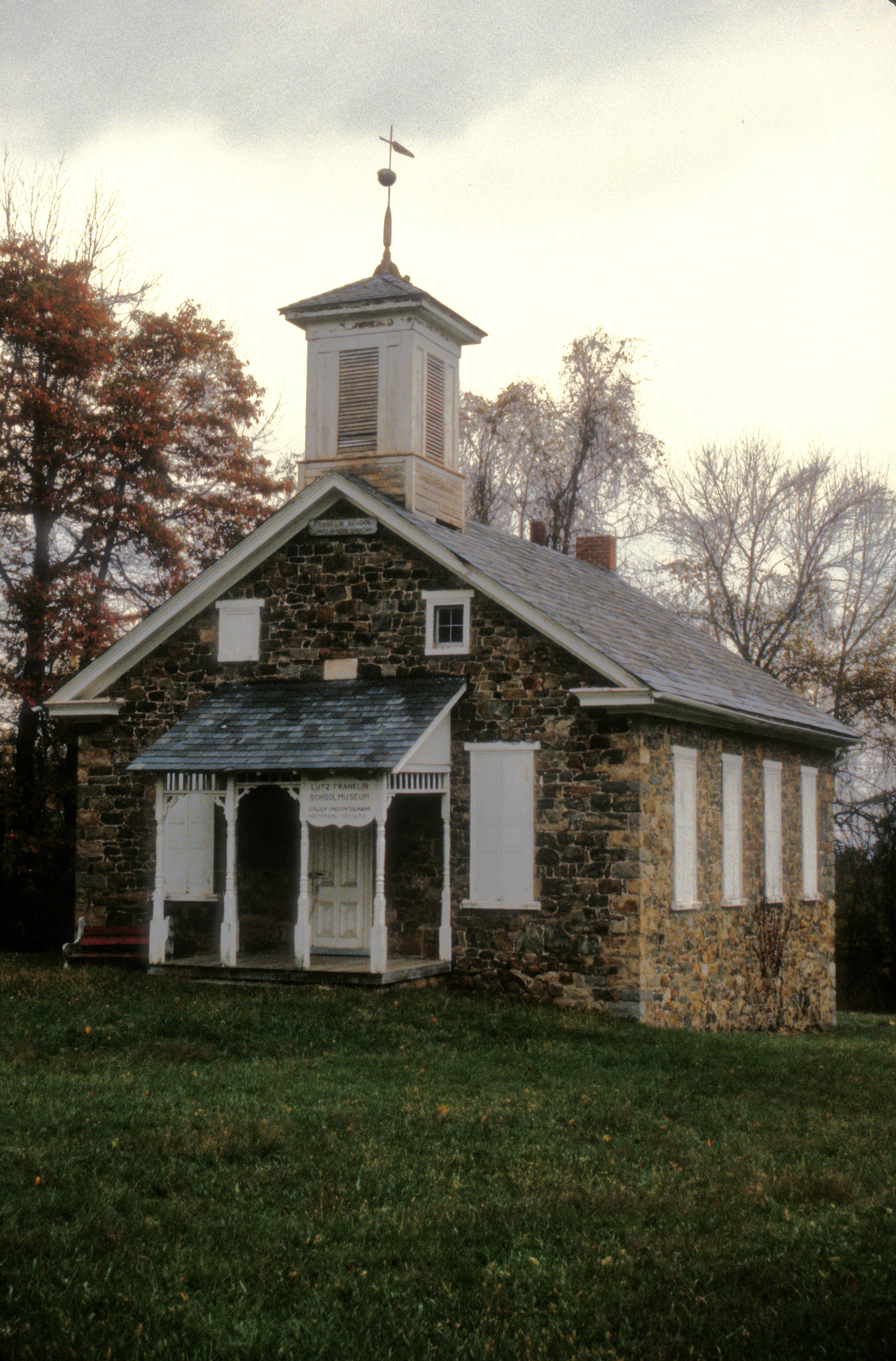
- Lutz-Franklin School in 1970

- Location within Pennsylvania Location within the United States
- Location: 4216 Countryside La., Lower Saucon Township, Pennsylvania, U.S.
- Coordinates: 40°37′28″N 75°16′49″W
- Area: 1 acre (0.40 ha)
- Built: 1880
- Architectural style: Late Victorian
- MPS: Educational Resources of Pennsylvania MPS
- NRHP reference No.: 08001268
- Added to NRHP: December 30, 2008

The Lutz-Franklin School is an historic one-room school building which is located in Lower Saucon Township in Northampton County, Pennsylvania.

It was added to the National Register of Historic Places in 2008.

== History and architectural features ==
Built in 1880, this historic school is a one-story, rectangular, stone building with a belfry, and was designed in the Late Victorian style. A front porch was added in 1901. The building measures thirty-two feet by thirty-eight feet and has a slate covered gable roof. It was used as a school until 1958. The building was restored in 2004-2006 and houses the Lower Saucon Township Historical Society Museum.
