= Ehrhart's Mill Historic District =

Historic district in Pennsylvania, United States

- U.S. National Register of Historic Places
- U.S. Historic district
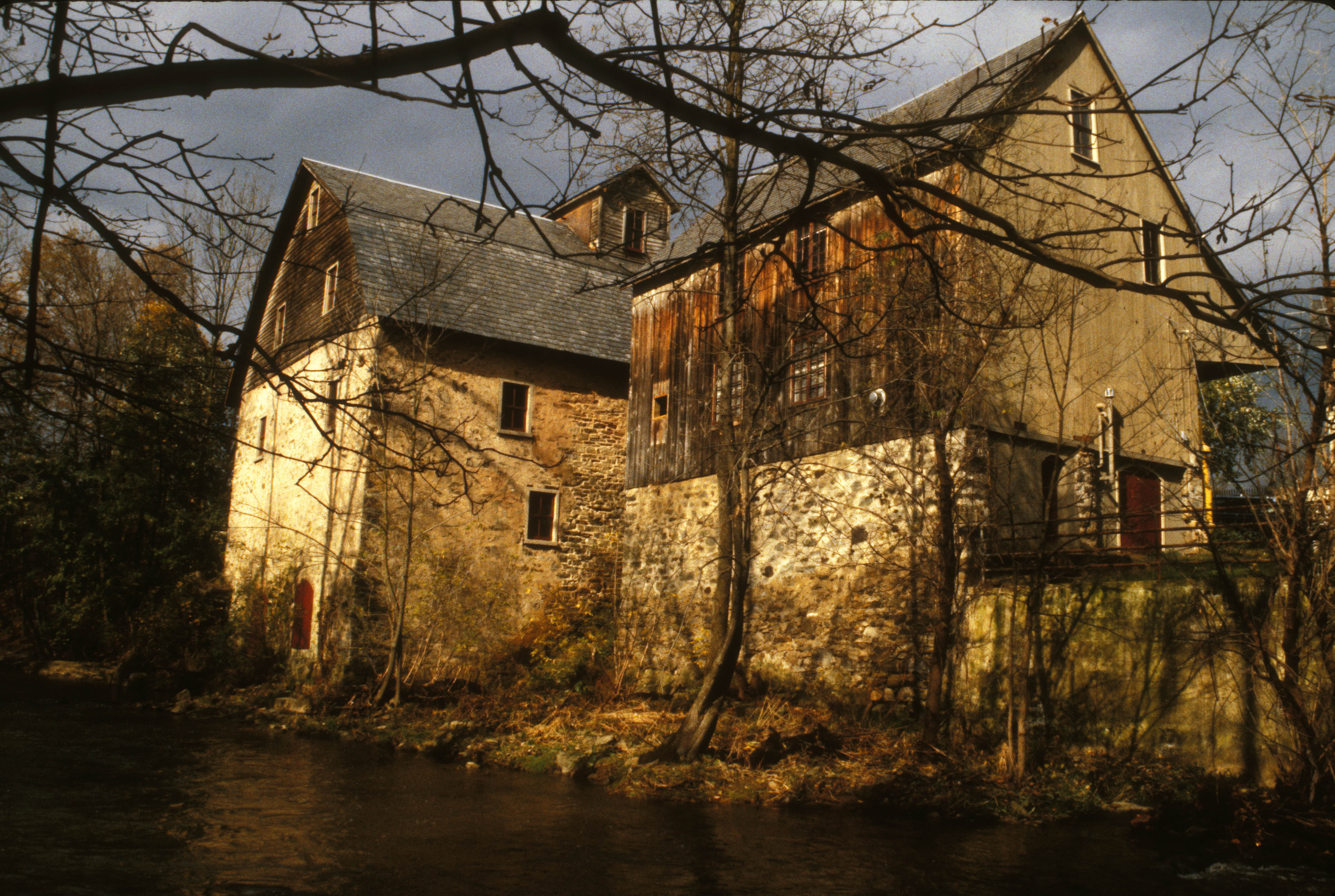
- Ehrhart's Mill in June 1970

- Location within Pennsylvania Location within the United States
- Nearest city: Old Mill Road, Lower Saucon Township, Pennsylvania, U.S
- Coordinates: 40°33′43″N 75°20′58″W
- Area: 5.2 acres (2.1 ha)
- Built: 1799, 1867, 1900
- Architect: Charles Beckel
- Architectural style: Pratt truss bridge
- NRHP reference No.: 87000666
- Added to NRHP: April 30, 1987

Ehrhart's Mill Historic District is a national historic district located along Saucon Creek at Lower Saucon Township in Northampton County in the Lehigh Valley region of eastern Pennsylvania. The district includes nine contributing buildings, two contributing sites, and four contributing structures associated with a 19th and early 20th century grist mill.

== District features ==
The buildings include a small barn, the stone grist mill (destroyed), and three stone or brick vernacular houses. The mill is a three-story, five level stone building with a slate covered gambrel roof. The most prominent structure is an iron pratt truss bridge built in 1867, and known as County Bridge #16. The mill was destroyed by fire.

== National Register of Historic Places ==
In recognition of the district's historical significance, it was added to the National Register of Historic Places in 1987.
