= Michael and Margaret Heller House =

Historic house in Pennsylvania, United States

- U.S. National Register of Historic Places
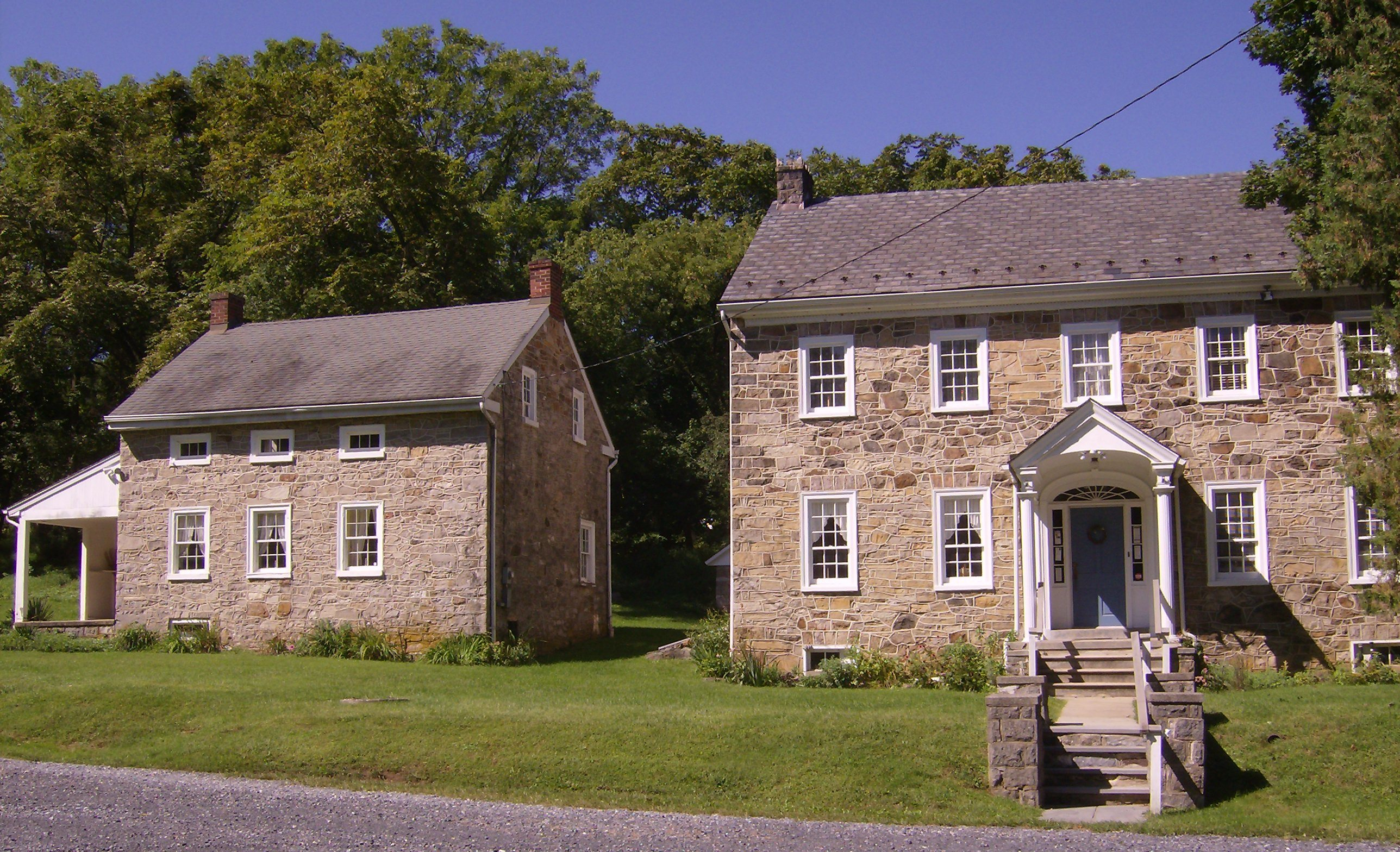
- Michael and Margaret Heller House in September 2013

- Location within Pennsylvania Location within the United States
- Location: 1890-1892 Friedensville Rd., Lower Saucon Township, Pennsylvania, U.S.
- Coordinates: 40°34′44″N 75°20′49″W
- Area: 2.2 acres (0.89 ha)
- Built: c. 1751, c. 1820, 1935
- Architectural style: Colonial Revival
- NRHP reference No.: 10000399
- Added to NRHP: June 28, 2010

The Michael and Margaret Heller House, also known as the Heller Homestead, is an historic home that is located in Lower Saucon Township in Northampton County, Pennsylvania, United States.

In 2010, it was added to the National Register of Historic Places in 2010.

== History and architectural features ==
This house is a two-part building that was renovated between 1934 and 1935 in the Colonial Revival style. It has a two-story, five-bay, main block that was built circa 1820, with a two-story, two-bay core structure to the rear that was built circa 1751. Also located on the property are the contributing Widow's House, which was built in 1850, and a mid-nineteenth century root cellar.

== Gallery ==
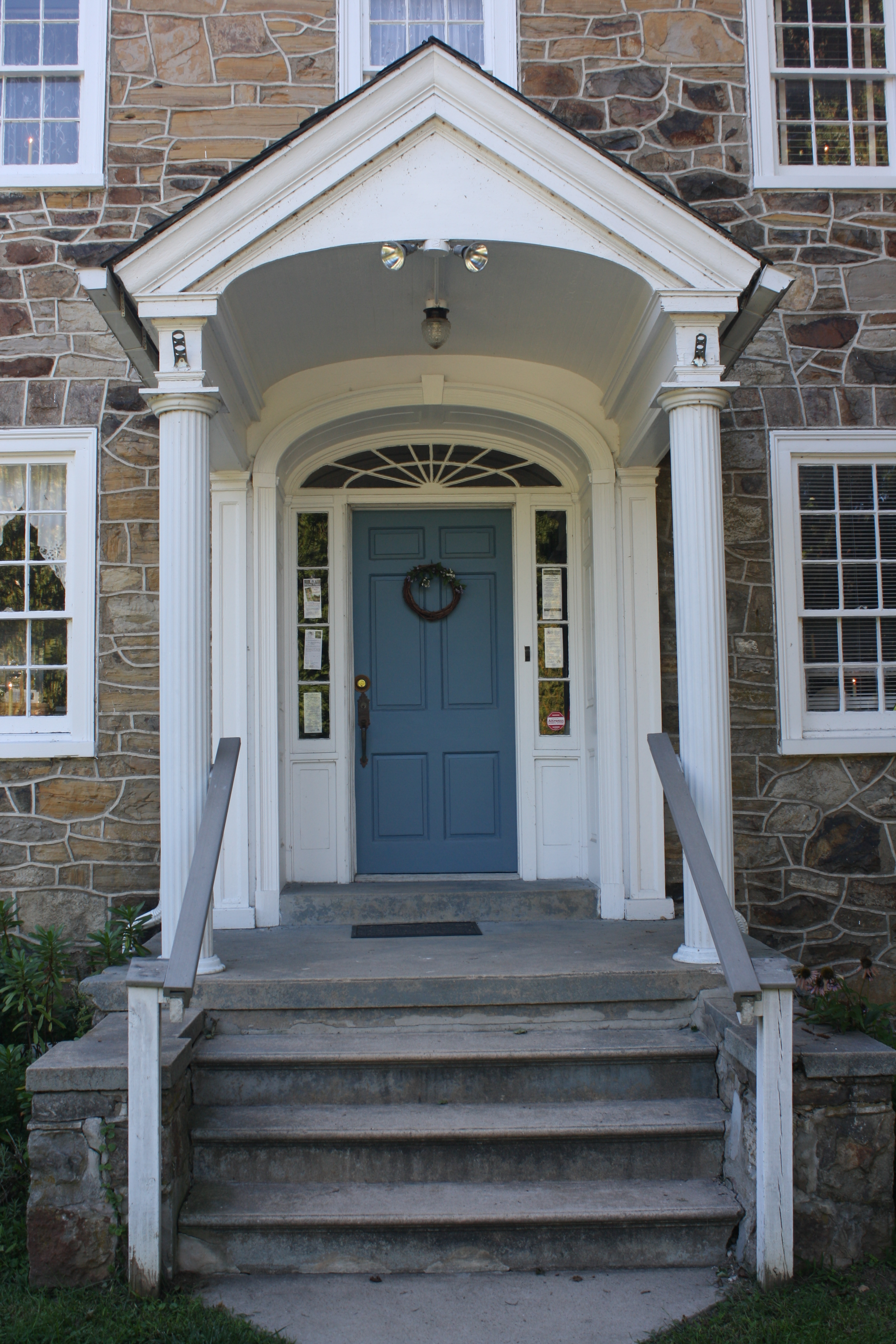
Colonial entrance

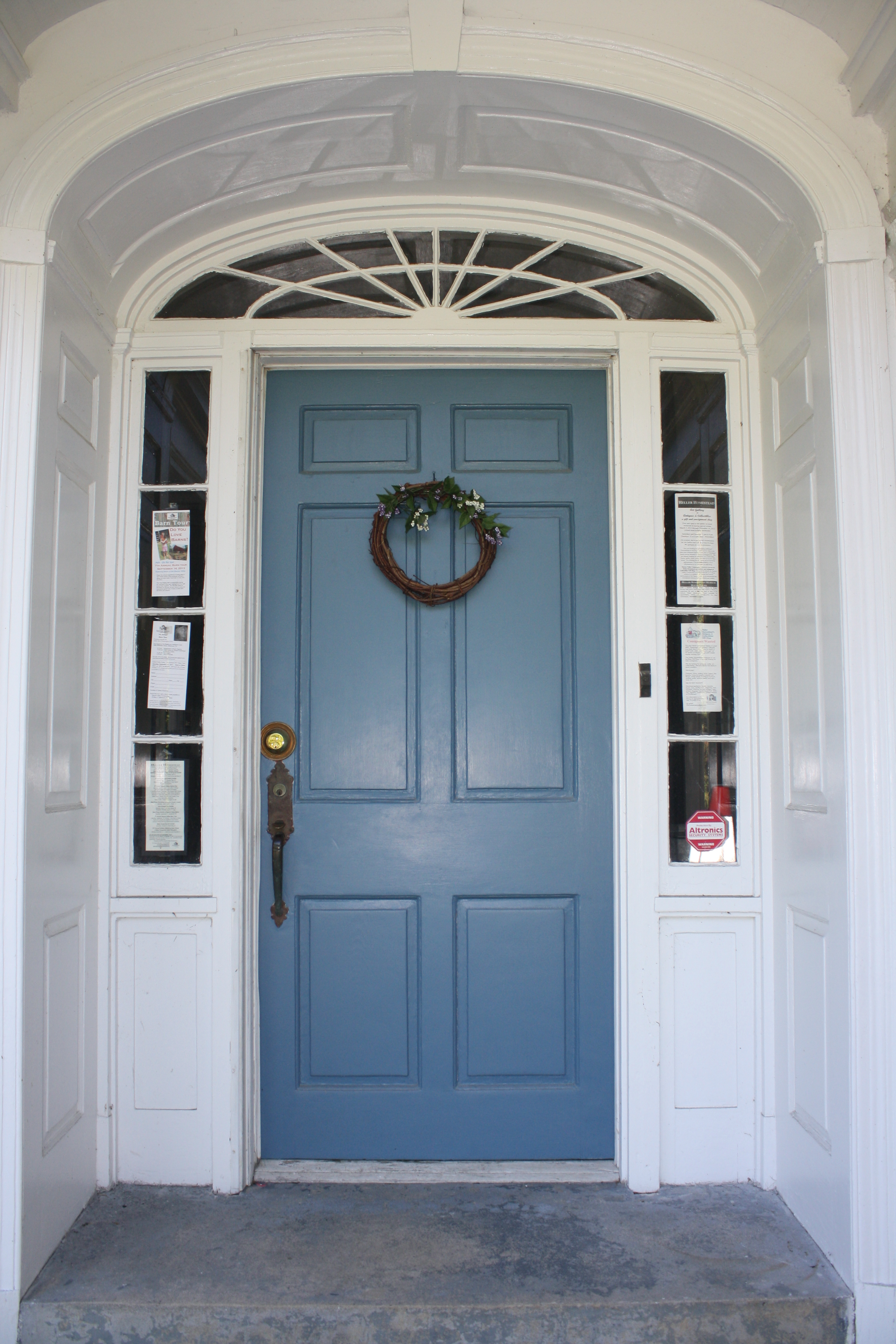
Colonial entrance

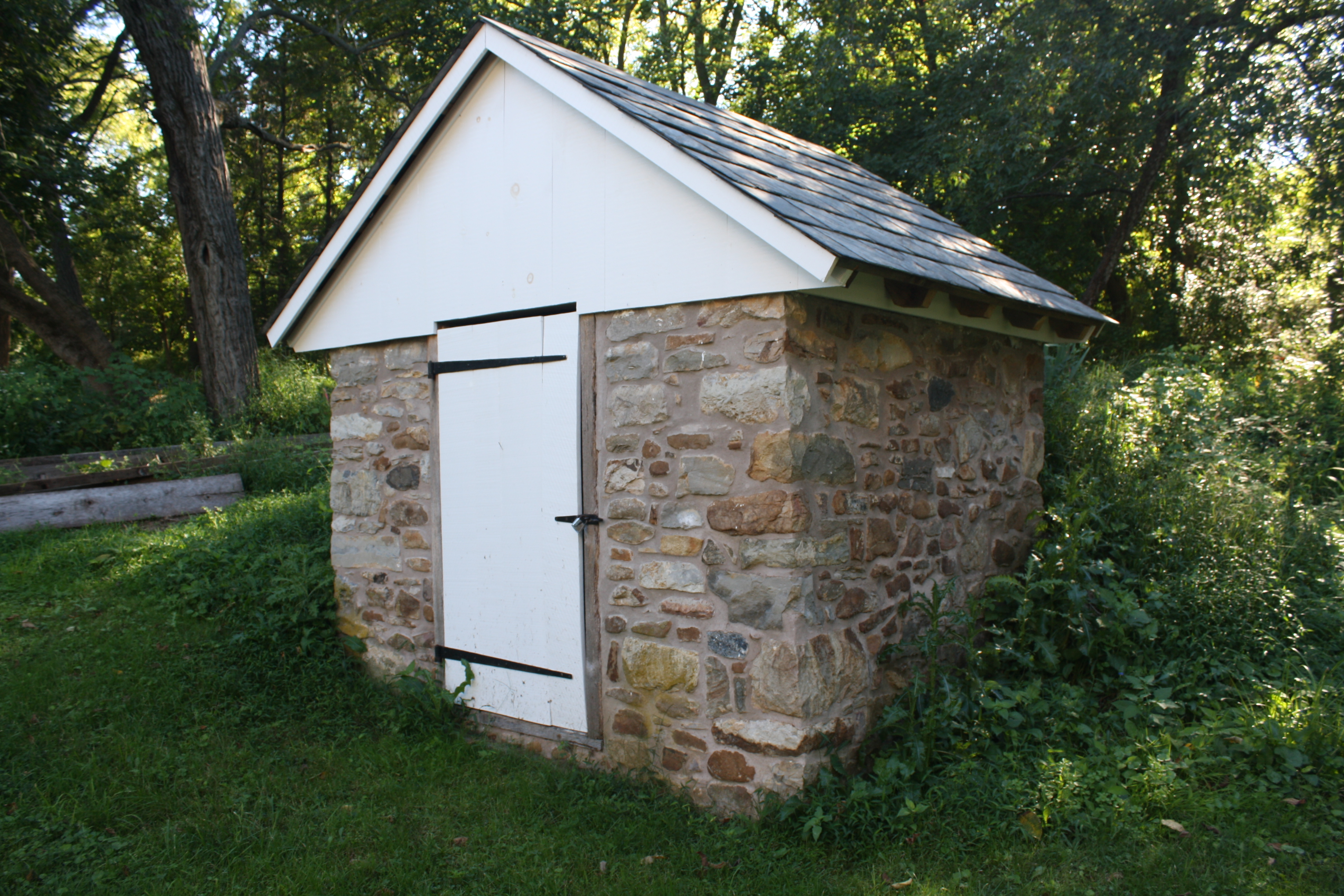
Root cellar

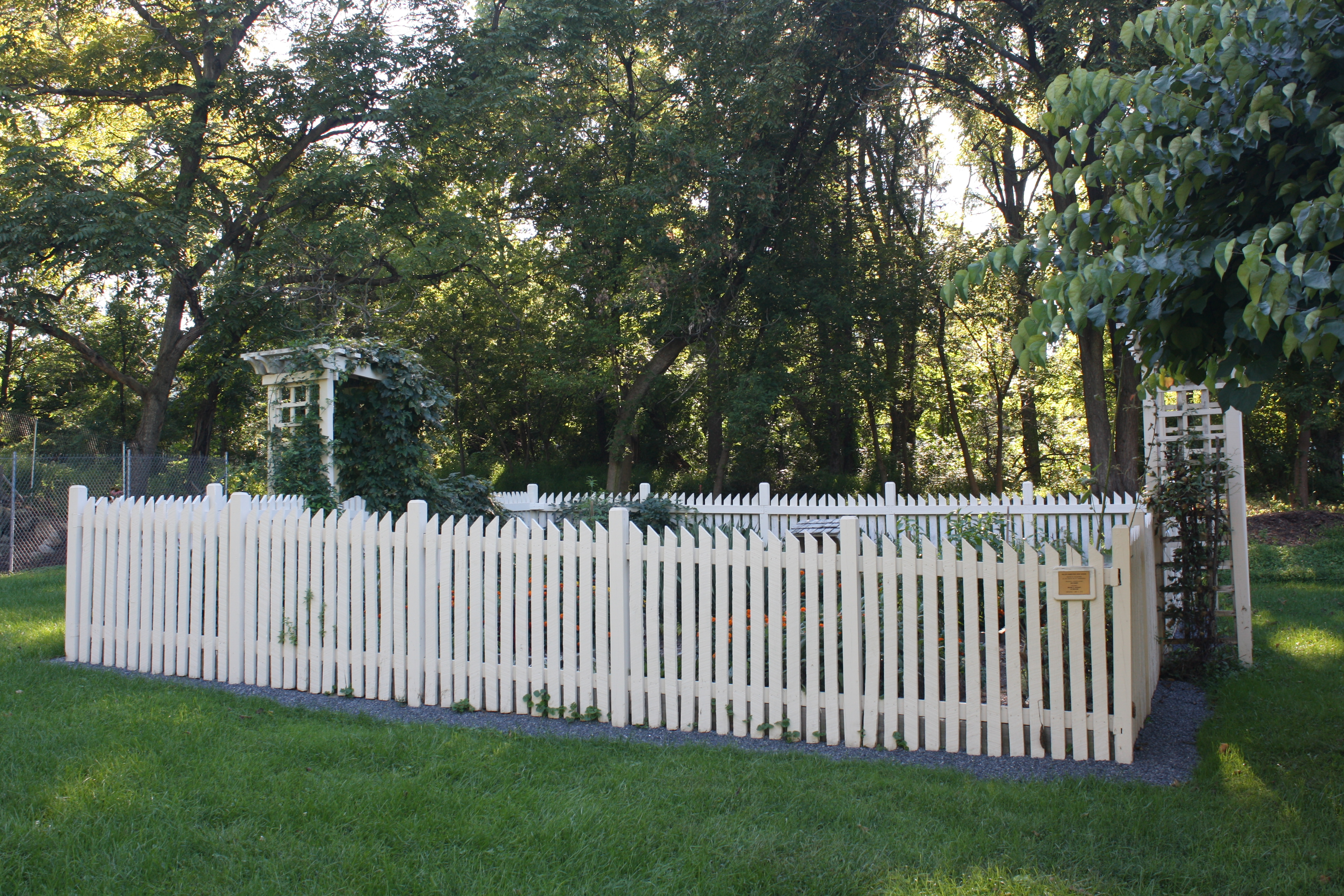
Vegetable garden

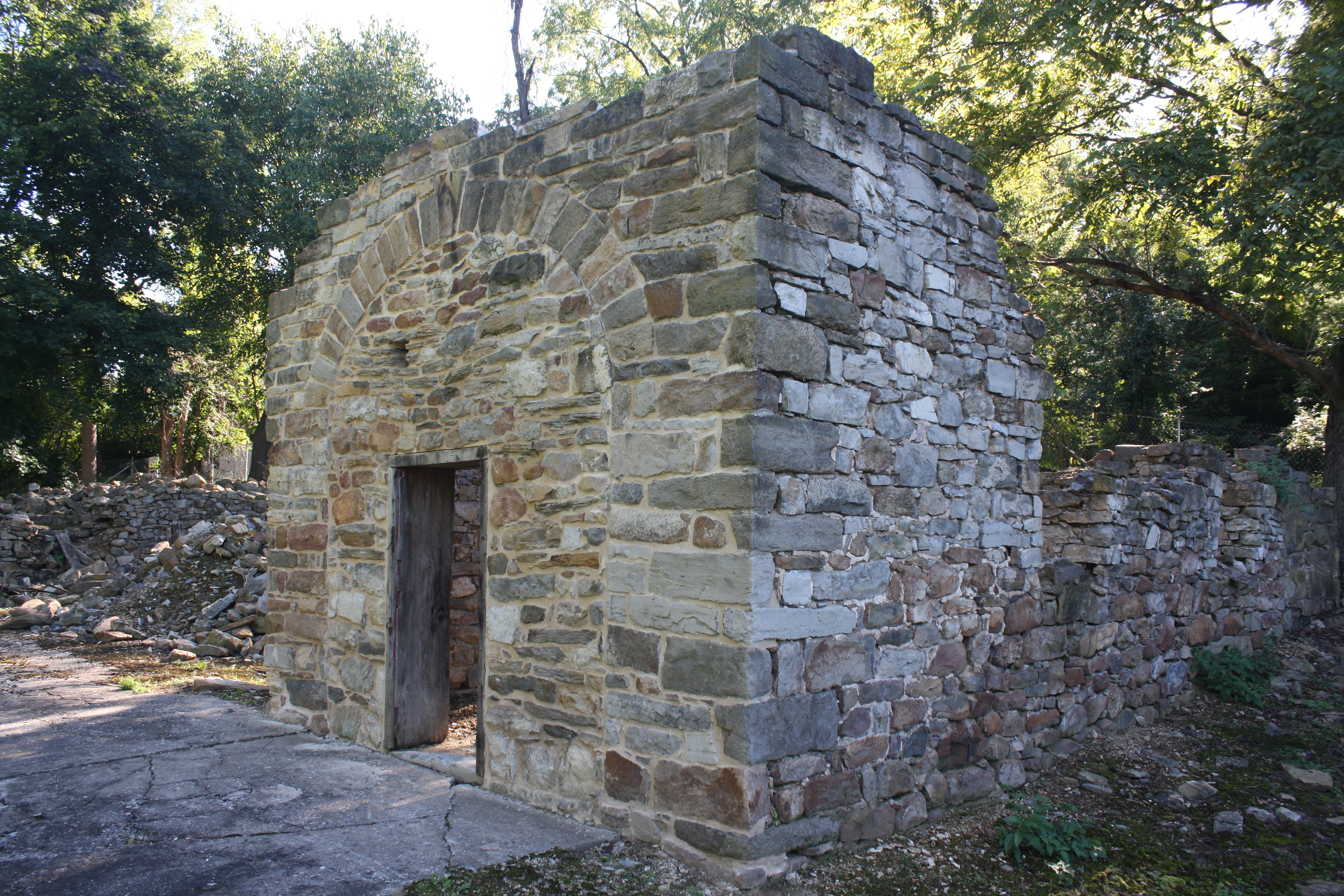
Barn ruins
