= Saucon Valley High School =

Location
- 2100 Polk Valley Road; Hellertown, Pennsylvania; United States; 40.5719°N 75.3298°W

Information
- Type: Public high school
- School district: Saucon Valley School District
- NCES School ID: 421173005352
- Teaching staff: 45.00 (on an FTE basis)
- Grades: 9th–12th
- Enrollment: 627 (2024–25)
- Student to teacher ratio: 13.93
- Campus type: Suburb: Large
- Colors: Grey and Black
- Athletics conference: Colonial League
- Mascot: Black panther
- Newspaper: The Panther Press
- Website: svhs.svpanthers.org

Saucon Valley High School is a four-year public high school in Hellertown, Pennsylvania, in the Lehigh Valley region of eastern Pennsylvania. It is located at 2100 Polk Valley Road in Hellertown in Northampton County.

It is the only high school in the Saucon Valley School District, which is consolidated in a single complex, the Saucon Valley School District Campus, as of September 1999. The campus, spread across 106 acres (0.43 km^{2}), combines the high school, middle school, elementary school, and administrative offices all under one roof and also includes ball fields, playgrounds, stadiums, and track facilities.

As of the 2024–25 school year, the school had an enrollment of 627 students, according to National Center for Education Statistics data.

The school's colors are red and black, and its mascot is the black panther.

== Athletics ==
Saucon Valley High School students participate in a range of sports, including football, baseball, softball, basketball, soccer, tennis, cross country, swimming, wrestling, field hockey, volleyball, lacrosse, golf, and track and field. The school competes in District XI tournaments, and is part of the Colonial League and the PIAA. Eligibility to participate is set by school board policies.

== Notable alumni ==
- Devon, adult film actress
- Talitha Diggs, sprinter
- Glenn Hetrick, actor, designer, and producer, Star Trek: Discovery and The Hunger Games
- Bailey Noble, actress, True Blood
