= Saucon Valley School District =

School district in Pennsylvania

Address
- 2097 Polk Valley Road Hellertown, Northampton County, Pennsylvania, 18055; United States

District information
- Schools: Three, including Saucon Valley High School
- Budget: $51.641 million
- NCES District ID: 4211730

Students and staff
- Students: 1,931 (2023-24)
- Teachers: 144.0 (on an FTE basis)
- Student–teacher ratio: 13.41
- Athletic conference: Colonial League
- District mascot: Panthers
- Colors: Grey and Black

Other information
- Website: www.svpanthers.org

Saucon Valley School District is a midsized suburban public school district located in Northampton County, Pennsylvania in the Lehigh Valley region of eastern Pennsylvania. It serves the borough of Hellertown and Lower Saucon Township. Saucon Valley School District encompasses approximately 20 square miles.

Students in ninth through 12th grades attend Saucon Valley High School in Hellertown. As of the 2023–24 school year, the school district had a total enrollment of 1,931 students between all three of its schools, according to National Center for Education Statistics data.

As of the 2000 census, the school district serves a resident population of 15,490. In 2009, district residents' per capita income was $26,599 while the district's median family income was $59,049.

== Schools ==
- Saucon Valley High School
- Saucon Valley Middle School
- Saucon Valley Elementary School
