= Lower Saucon Township, Pennsylvania =

Township in Pennsylvania, US

Lower Saucon Township
- Township
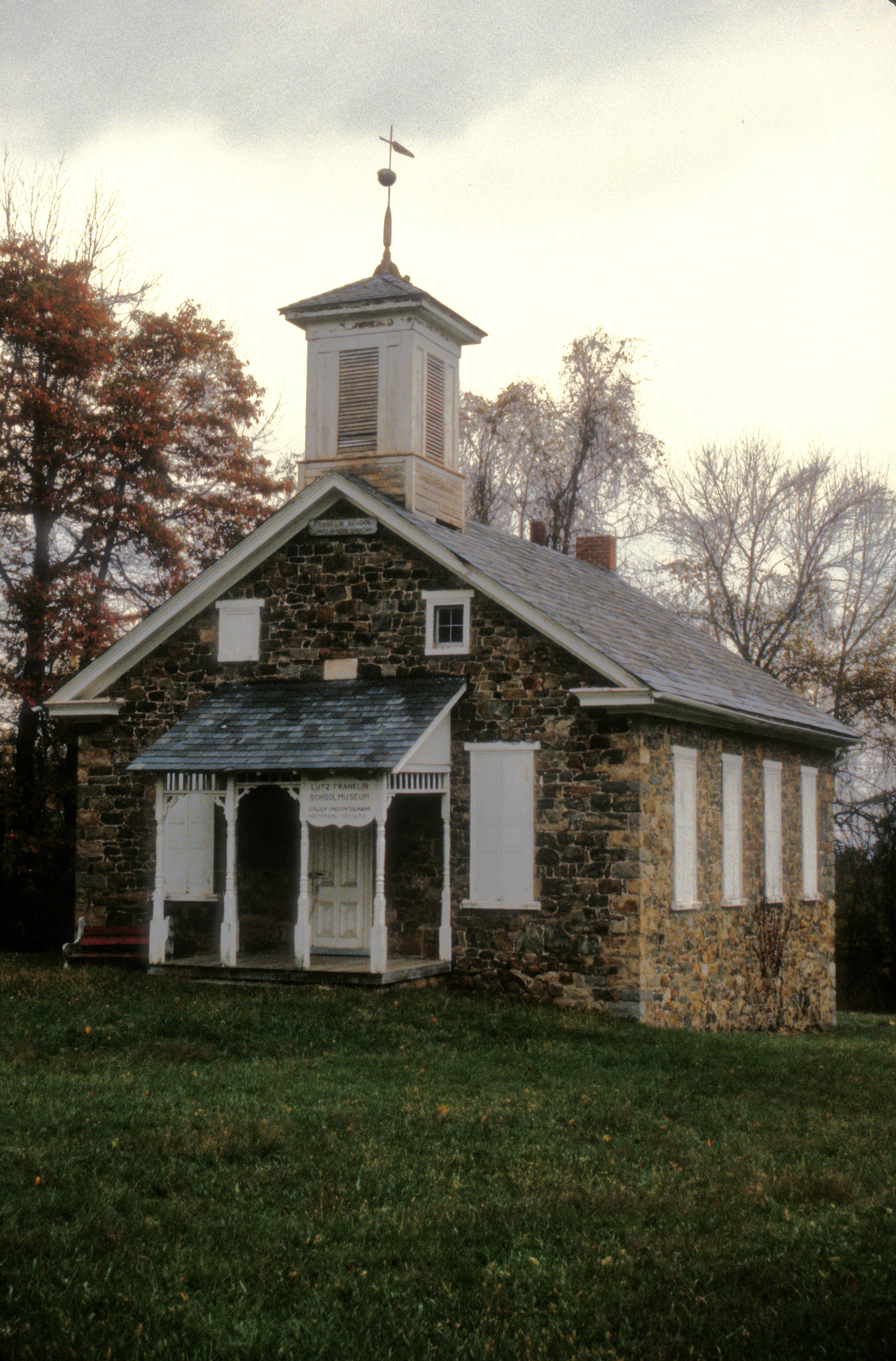
- Lutz-Franklin School, built in 1880 in Lower Saucon Township, June 1970

- Seal

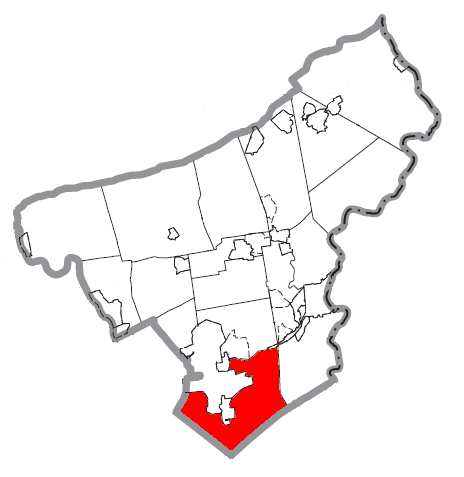
- Lower Saucon Township in Northampton County Pennsylvania
- Coordinates: 40°38′00″N 75°16′59″W
- Country: United States
- State: Pennsylvania
- County: Northampton

Area
  - Township: 24.51 sq mi (63.48 km^{2})
  - Land: 24.27 sq mi (62.86 km^{2})
  - Water: 0.24 sq mi (0.62 km^{2})
- Elevation: 417 ft (127 m)

Population (2010)
  - Township: 10,772
  - Estimate (2016): 10,813
  - Density: 445.5/sq mi (172.02/km^{2})
  - Metro: 865,310 (US: 68th)
- Time zone: UTC-5 (EST)
  - Summer (DST): UTC-4 (EDT)
- ZIP Codes: 18015 and 18055
- Area code: 610
- FIPS code: 42-095-45104
- Primary airport: Lehigh Valley International Airport
- Major hospital: Lehigh Valley Hospital–Cedar Crest
- School district: Saucon Valley
- Website: www.lowersaucontownship.org

Lower Saucon Township is a township in Northampton County, Pennsylvania, United States. The township's population was 10,772 as of the 2010 census. The township is part of the Lehigh Valley metropolitan area, which had a population of 861,899 and was the 68th-most populous metropolitan area in the U.S. as of the 2020 census.

Lower Saucon Township is located 6 miles (9.7 km) east of Allentown, 58.9 miles (94.8 km) north of Philadelphia, and 83.6 miles (134.5 km) west of New York City. Addresses in nearby in township are either Hellertown or Bethlehem.

== History ==
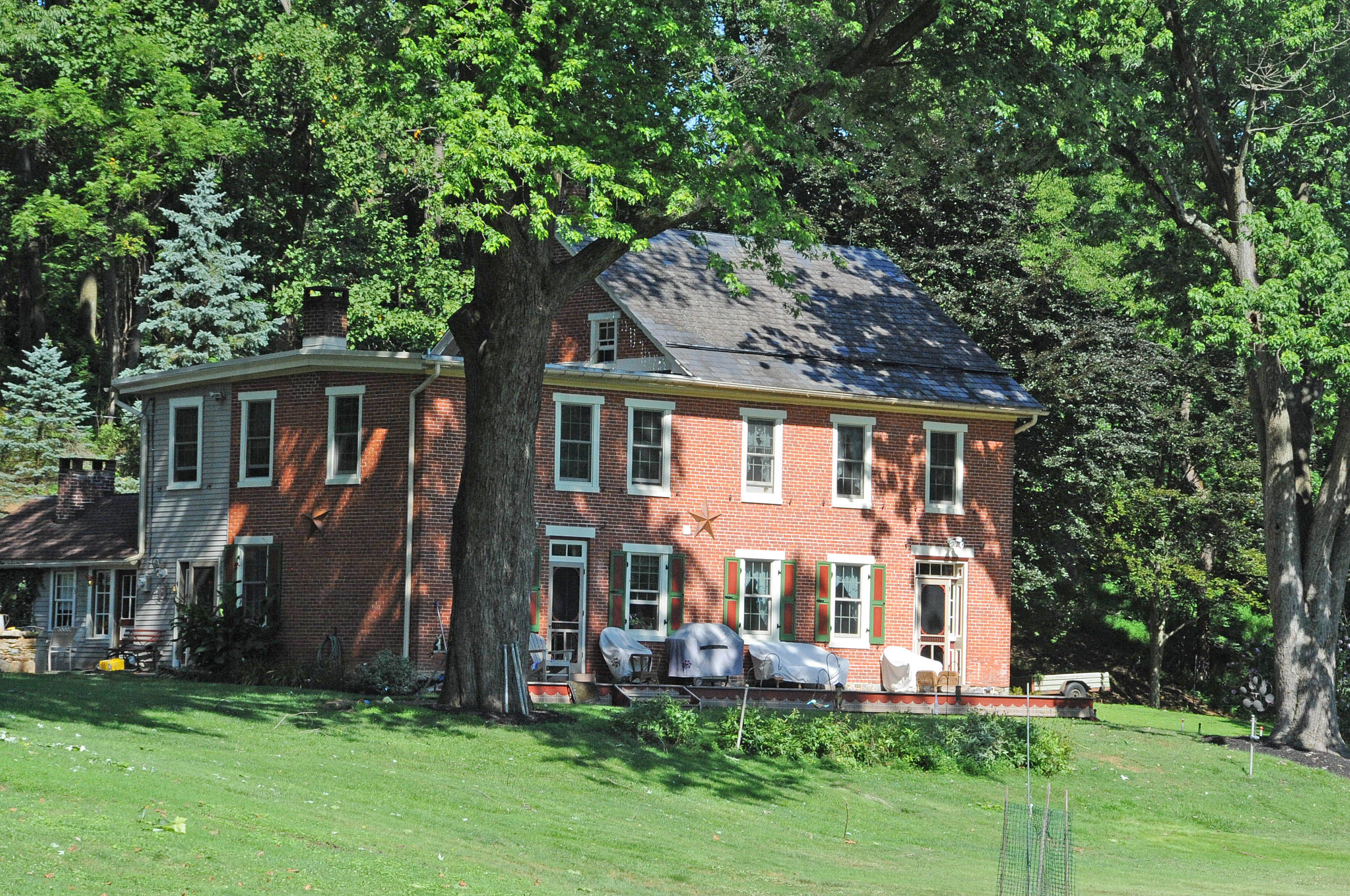
John Wagner Homestead, which is listed on the National Register of Historic Places, in Lower Saucon Township, August 2020

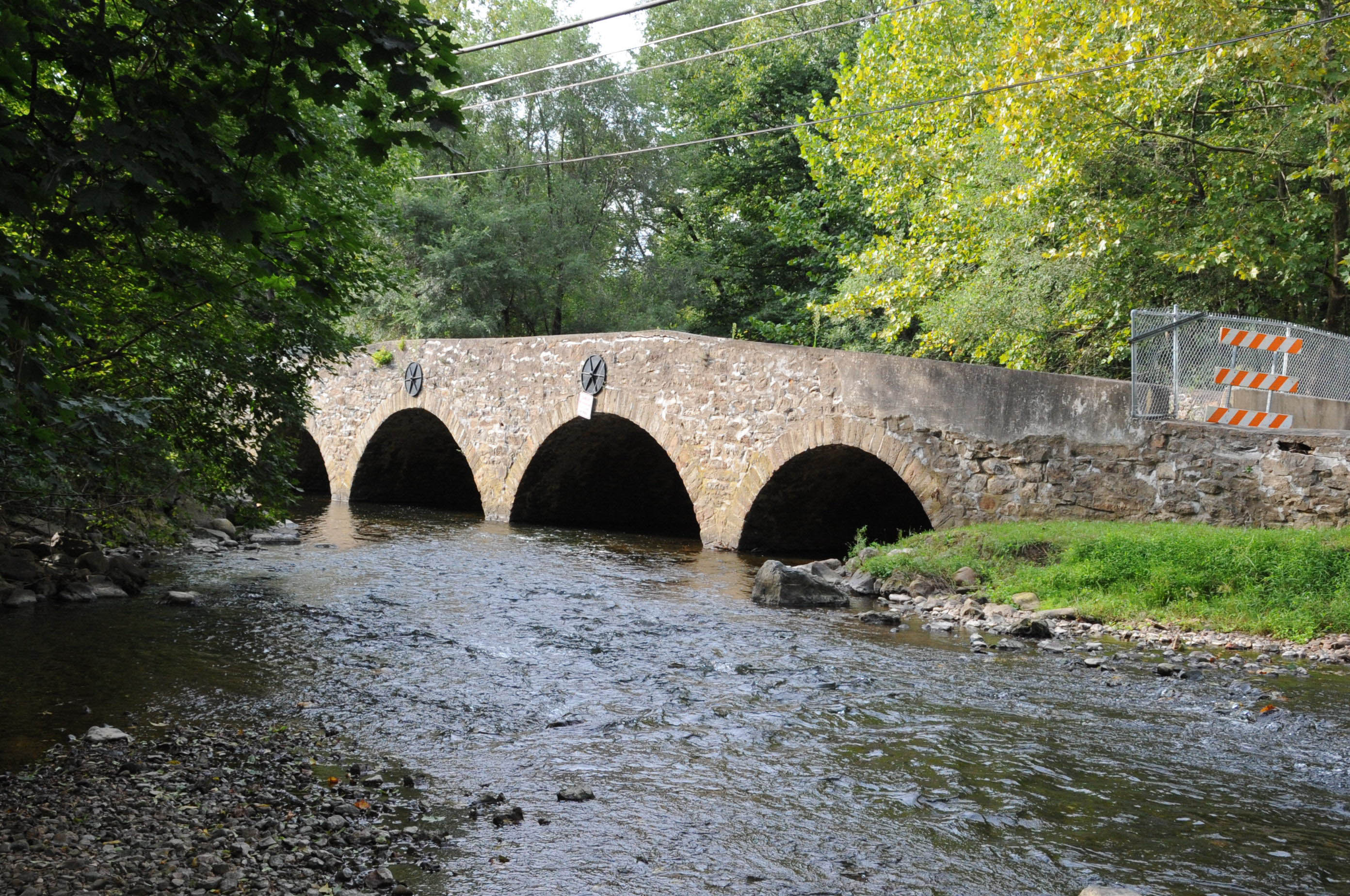
Meadows Road Bridge crossing Saucon Creek in Lower Saucon Township, September 2020

=== 17th century ===
Until the mid-17th century, Lenape Native American tribes hunted and inhabited the land of Lower Saucon Township. European traders first arrived in the area in the 17th century, and the Lenape peacefully traded with them with the exception of several periodic skirmishes. William Penn, who later founded the colonial-era Province of Pennsylvania, one of the initial Thirteen Colonies, was granted land on March 4, 1681, by King Charles II to repay a debt owed to Penn's father, a Royal Navy officer of the same name.

The land grant included what is now Lower Saucon Township. However, Penn soon realized that he needed to purchase the land from the Native Americans to maintain clear ownership. Penn advertised throughout Europe, offering 100-acre (0.40 km^{2}) parcels of land for 40 shillings, subject to a rent of one shilling per annum forever.

=== 18th century ===
In 1737, Penn's sons expanded their land holdings through the Walking Purchase to include most of the Lehigh Valley. Although the Lenape did not think this was a legitimate claim, they eventually moved out of the area, allowing Europeans to settle it. Sometime before 1737, Nathaniel Irish established a farm, built a grist and saw mill, and opened a land office for William Penn. He is considered the first European settler in Lower Saucon Township. Irish was the first justice of the peace in the area, and the first King's Highway, from Philadelphia to the Lehigh Valley, built in 1737, led to his property. His son, also named Nathaniel Irish (1737-1816), built Nathaniel Irish House in Philadelphia.

Lower Saucon Township was chartered in 1743, when it was still a part of Bucks County. It was established in the rich farmland along Saucon Creek. The name Saucon comes from the native Unami language word sakunk, meaning “at the mouth of the creek.” The township also included South Bethlehem until 1865 and Hellertown until 1872.

German immigrants, convinced by Penn's favorable description of the New World, settled Lower Saucon Township in large numbers, beginning in the 1730s. Some of the surnames of the early German settlers were Boehm, Wagner, Appel, Riegel, Brunner, Lerch, Laubach, Oberley, Heller, Shimer, and Lutz. These early settlers were hardworking, and their farms prospered. There were numerous mills built to provide sawed wood, flour, textiles, paper, and gunpowder. Other early industry included lime kilns and the extraction of zinc and iron ore.

During the Revolutionary War, many German farmers enlisted in the Continental Army to fight the British. At a time when the Continental Army's reserves were depleted, they offered to sell wheat and rye on credit. In 1777, soldiers of the Continental Army transporting the Liberty Bell to Allentown, passing through Lower Saucon and spending a night in Leithsville. The Marquis de Lafayette stopped at Wagner's Tavern in Hellertown on his way to Bethlehem during the Revolutionary War.

The first church, Lower Saucon Church, was established in 1734, soon after the early settlers' arrival. It was built by a German Reformed congregation on what is present-day Easton Road. There were ten schools in the township, established by local church congregations, before the Pennsylvania state legislature developed the state's public school system in 1834.

=== 19th century ===
North Penn Railroad, connecting Philadelphia to Bethlehem, was completed in 1856. This 55-mile (89 km) line provided an impetus to building iron smelters in Bingen, Hellertown, and Iron Hill due to the township's wealth of iron ore and limestone. The railroad brought anthracite coal to this industry, transported pig iron to markets, and provided transportation for Lower Saucon Township's residents.

=== 20th and 21st centuries ===
Lower Saucon Township was impacted by the late 20th century downturn and eventual closure and bankruptcy of Bethlehem Steel, which was the second-largest steel manufacturer in the world for most of the 20th century. Bethlehem Steel executives purchased farmland in Lower Saucon Townships and built large estates in the township, and the steel company became the largest employer in the Lehigh Valley region. It underwent a substantial reduction in manufacturing in 1982 and ultimately ceased manufacturing entirely in 1995, resulting in the termination of employment for many township residents.

Four locations in Lower Saucon Township have been named to the National Register of Historic Places: Ehrhart's Mill Historic District, Michael and Margaret Heller House, Lutz-Franklin School, and Northampton County Bridge No. 15.

== Geography ==
According to the U.S. Census Bureau, the township has a total area of 24.3 square miles (62.9 km^{2}), of which 24.1 square miles (62.5 km^{2}) is land and 0.2 square mile (0.4 km^{2}) (0.62%) is water. The township is in the Delaware watershed and borders the Lehigh River to the north, which drains Lower Saucon, except for the Leithsville area in the extreme south, which is drained by Cooks Creek east into the Delaware River.

There are nine villages in the township: Bingen, Colesville, Leithsville, Lower Saucon, Redington, Seidersville, Steel City, Wassergass, and Wydnor.

=== Adjacent municipalities ===
- Bethlehem (north and northwest)
- Hellertown (mostly surrounded by Lower Saucon)
- Freemansburg (northwest)
- Bethlehem Township (north)
- Easton (northeast)
- Williams Township (east)
- Durham Township, Bucks County (tangent to the southeast)
- Springfield Township, Bucks County (south)
- Upper Saucon Township, Lehigh County (southwest)
- Salisbury Township, Lehigh County (west)
- Fountain Hill, Lehigh County (northwest)

=== Climate ===
Lower Saucon Township has a hot summer humid continental climate (Dfa) and the hardiness zone is 6b. Average temperatures in Wassergass range from 28.7 °F in January to 73.2 °F in July, while in Wydnor they average from 28.9 °F in January to 73.6 °F in July.

== Transportation ==
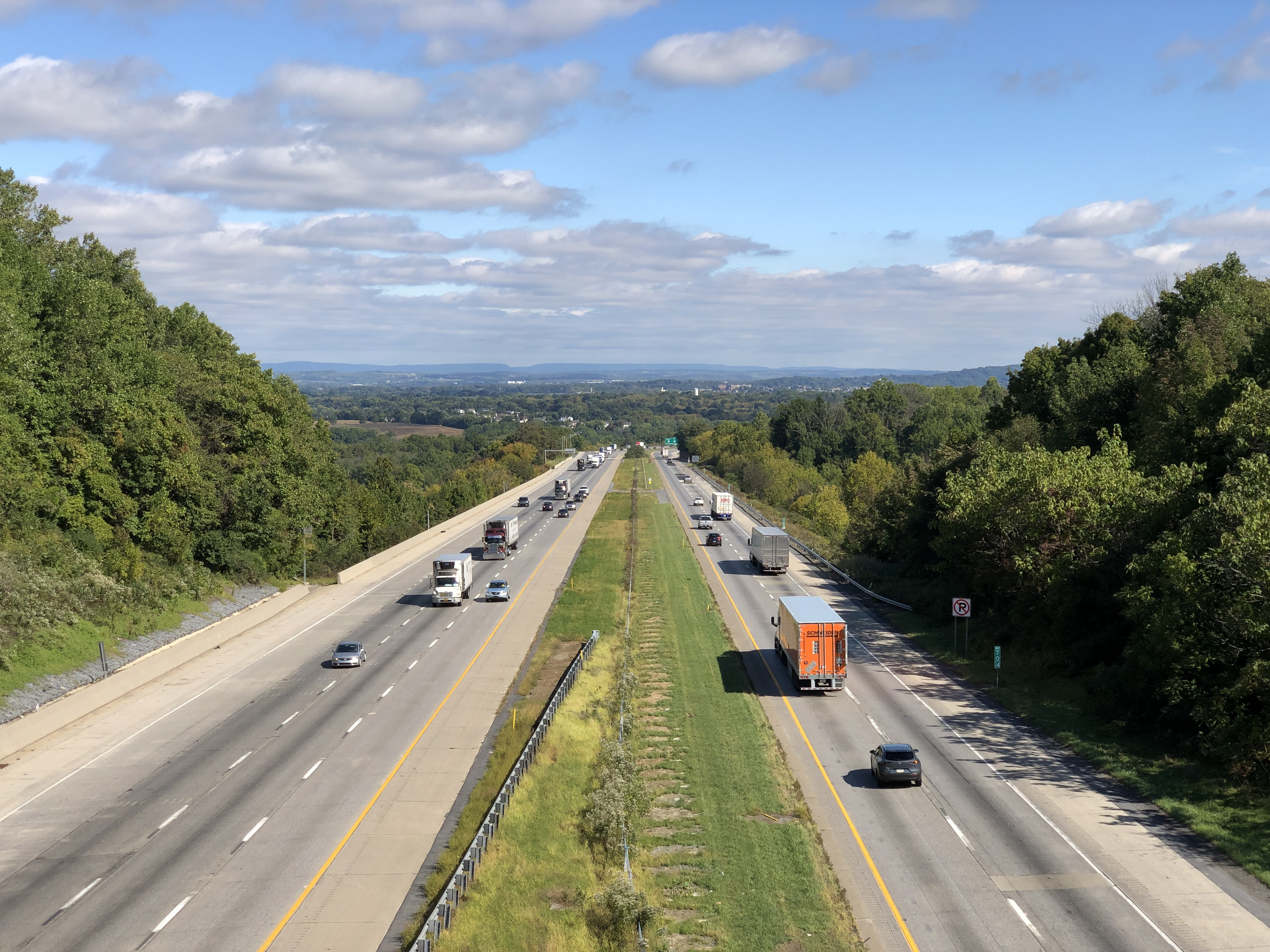
I-78 East in Lower Saucon Township

As of 2021, there were 117.17 miles (188.57 km) of public roads in Lower Saucon Township, which 30.23 miles (48.65 km) are maintained by the Pennsylvania Department of Transportation (PennDOT) and 86.94 miles (139.92 km) were maintained by the township.

Interstate 78 is the most prominent highway traversing Lower Saucon Township. It follows a southwest–northeast alignment through the middle of the township. However, the nearest interchanges serving local roads are all in neighboring municipalities. Pennsylvania Route 33 begins at I-78 in the far northeast corner of the township and heads northward. Pennsylvania Route 378 follows Philadelphia Pike along a north–south alignment across the western portion of the township. Finally, Pennsylvania Route 412 follows Leithsville Road along a northwest–southeast alignment across the southern portion of the township.

== Demographics ==
Historical population
Census	Pop.	Note	%±
2000	9,884		—
2010	10,772		9.0%
2016 (est.)	10,813		0.4%
U.S. Decennial Census

As of the 2000 census, there were 9,884 people, 3,735 households, and 2,890 families residing in the township. The population density was 409.4 inhabitants per square mile (158.1/km^{2}). There were 3,915 housing units at an average density of 162.2 per square mile (62.6/km^{2}). The racial makeup of the township was 96.73% white, 0.56% African American, 0.16% Native American, 1.20% Asian, 0.06% Pacific Islander, 0.69% from other races, and 0.60% from two or more races. Hispanic or Latino of any race were 2.56% of the population.

There were 3,735 households, out of which 32.4% had children under the age of 18 living with them, 68.6% were married couples living together, 5.8% had a female householder with no husband present, and 22.6% were non-families. 18.2% of all households were made up of individuals, and 7.6% had someone living alone who was 65 years of age or older. The average household size was 2.63 and the average family size was 3.00. In the township, the population was spread out, with 23.8% under the age of 18, 5.5% from 18 to 24, 27.9% from 25 to 44, 28.1% from 45 to 64, and 14.6% who were 65 years of age or older. The median age was 41 years. For every 100 females, there were 98.7 males. For every 100 females age 18 and over, there were 96.7 males. The median income for a household in the township was $59,964, and the median income for a family was $68,457. Males had a median income of $46,727 versus $30,256 for females. The per capita income for the township was $30,280. About 2.0% of families and 2.5% of the population were below the poverty line, including 2.9% of those under age 18 and 1.7% of those age 65 or over.

== Education ==
Lower Saucon Township and Hellertown are served by the Saucon Valley School District. Students in grades nine through 12 attend Saucon Valley High School in Hellertown.

Lower Saucon Township is also home to Lehigh University's Goodman athletic campus, the home of Lehigh Mountain Hawks athletics.
