= Saucon Creek =

Tributary of the Lehigh River in Pennsylvania

Coordinates: 40.53523°N 75.44654°W

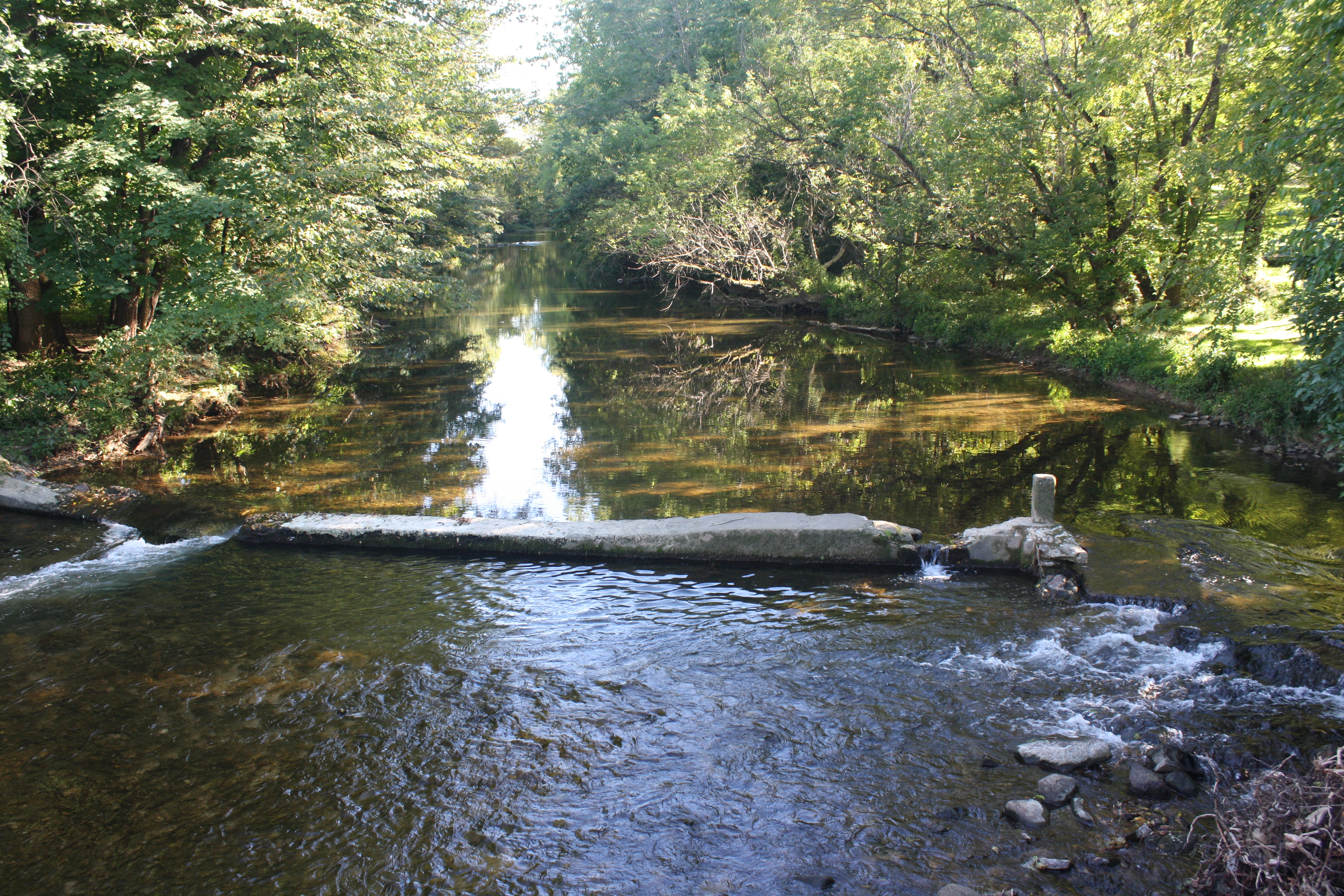
Saucon Creek in Hellertown in September 2013

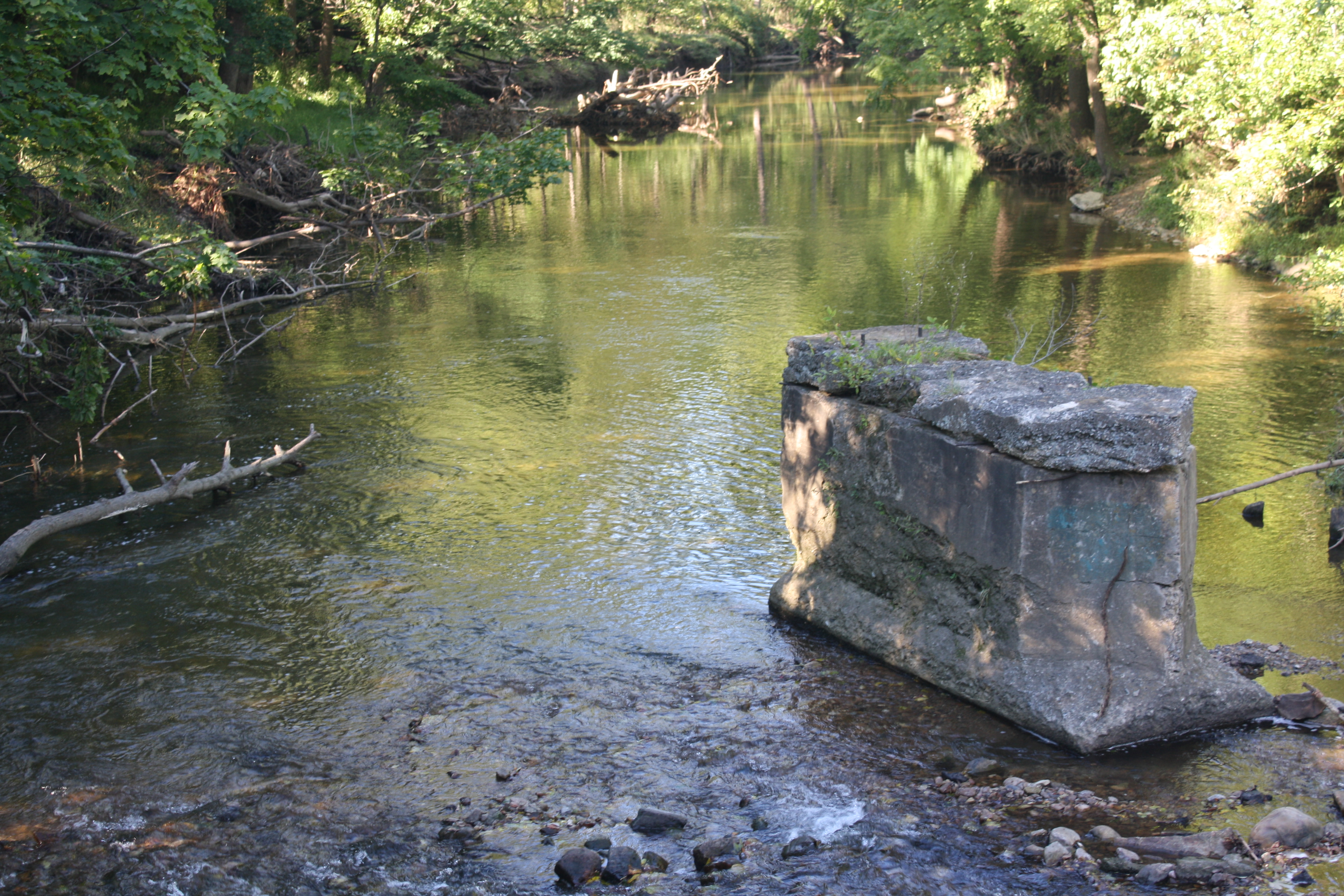
Ruins of the former Friedensville Road Bridge in Saucon Creek in Hellertown in September 2013

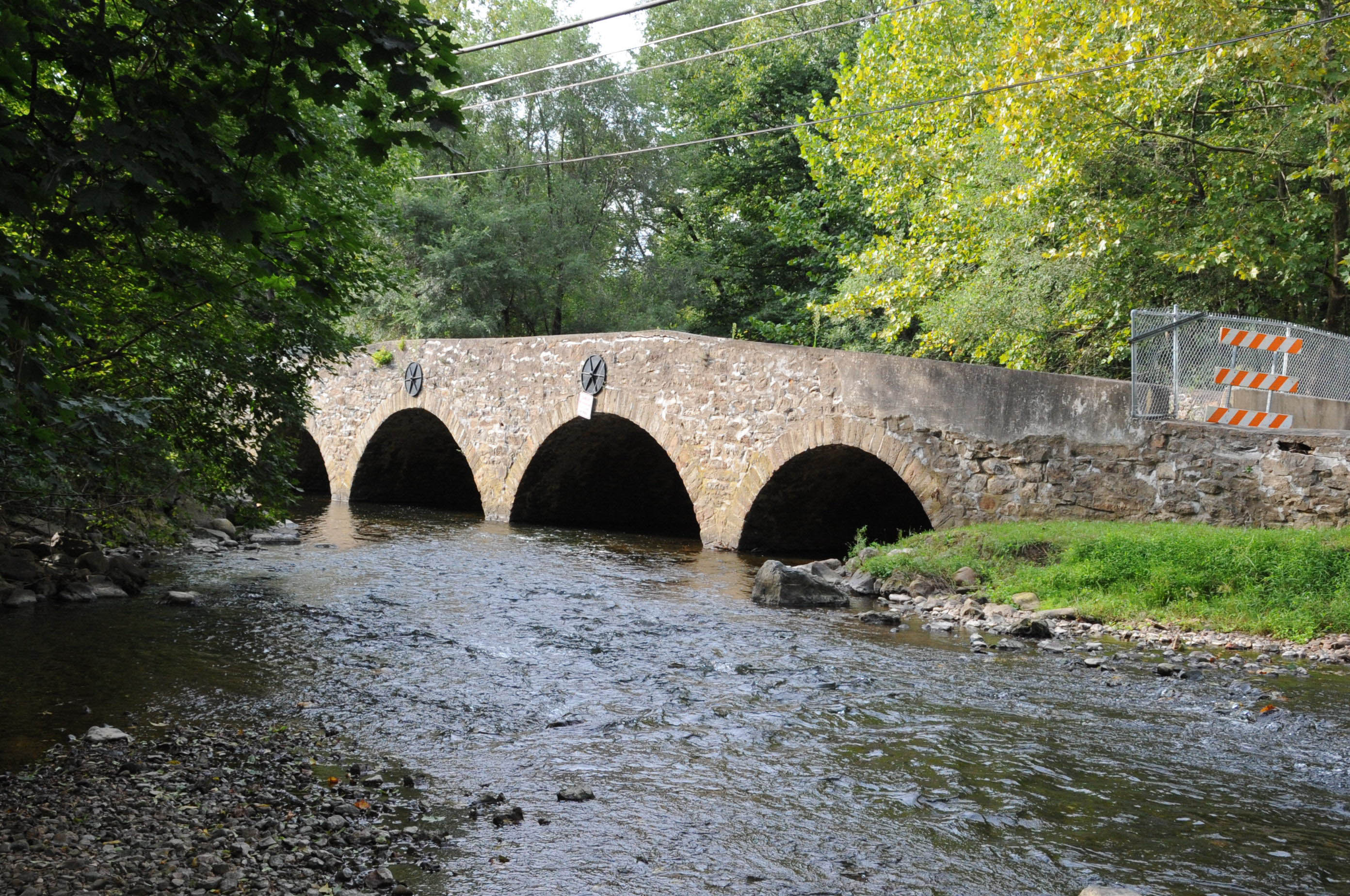
Meadows Road Bridge crossing Saucon Creek in Lower Saucon Township in September 2020

Saucon Creek is a 17.0-mile-long (27.4 km) tributary of the Lehigh River in Lehigh and Northampton counties, Pennsylvania, in the United States.

Saucon Creek starts in Lower Milford Township, flows to the northeast passing through the communities of Limeport, Bingen, and Hellertown, and joins the Lehigh River in Bethlehem. The Meadows Banquet Center in Hellertown and Saucon Park in Bethlehem are located along the Saucon. The Ehrhart's Mill Historic District is located along Saucon Creek.

== See also ==
- List of rivers of Pennsylvania
- Monocacy Creek, next tributary of the Lehigh River going upriver
- Nancy Run, next tributary of the Lehigh River going downriver
